= 1920 Punjab Legislative Council election =

1920 Punjab Provincial Legislative Council election
- 1920

71 seats of The Punjab Legislative Council
- Turnout: 34.81%
	First party
Leader	None
Party	Independent
Seats won	71

First Provincial Legislative Council election was held in Punjab in 1920 as mandated by the Government of India Act 1919.

== Introduction ==
The First World War gave the momentum to the growing demand for self-government in British India. Therefore, the new constitutional reforms, under the Montagu–Chelmsford Reforms were introduced by British Government. The scheme was implemented through the Government of India Act 1919. The first Council was constituted on 8 January 1921 for the first time. The election for first Council was held in December 1920. 71 members were elected and 22 were nominated by Governor.

In 1920 the election was not contested on Party lines thus all elected candidates considered as Independent.

The term of the council was fixed for three years. The council, for first time, was presided by a nominated person designated as President and in his absence, an elected person designated as Deputy President.

The first election which was conducted in the house was of Deputy President between Mehtab Singh and Chaudhary M. Amin. Mehtab Singh won election by securing 48 votes, while Amin secured 37 Votes.

The First Council had held 98 meetings when the Lieutenant Governor of Punjab dissolved the council on 27 October 1923 after completion of three years tenure.

== Distribution of seats ==
Category	Urban	Rural	Total
General	7	13	20
Mohammadans	5	27	32
Sikh	1	11	12
Special^	-	-	7
Total	13	51	71

Special^ (Non-Territorial)

- Punjab Landholders - 3
  - General - 1
  - Mohammadan - 1
  - Sikh - 1
- Baluch Tumandars - 1
- Punjab Universities - 1
- Punjab Commerce and Trade - 1
- Punjab Industry - 1

== Voter statistics ==
- Total Voters - 5,33,812
- Total Vote Turnout - 34.81%
- Territorial Constituencies voters - 5,29,189
  - Highest No. of Voters - 34,594 in South-Eastern Towns (Muhammadan-Urban)
  - Lowest No. of Voters - 2,271 in Dera Gazi Khan (Muhammadan-Rural)
  - Highest Turnout - 67% in Gujarat East (Muhammadan-Rural)
  - Lowest Turnout - 2% in Amritsar City (Mohammadans-Urban)
- Non-Territorial Constituencies voters - 4,623
  - Highest No. of Voters - 1,984 in Punjab Universities
  - Lowest No. of Voters - 11 in Baluch Tumandars
  - Highest Turnout - 100% in Baluch Tumandars
  - Lowesr Turnout - 43% in Punjab Universities

== Office bearer ==
Post	Holder	Tenure	
President	Montagu Sherard Dawes Butler	8 January 1921	21 March 1922
President	Herbert Alexander Casson	10 May 1922	27 October 1923
Deputy President	Mehtab Singh	23 February 1921	24 October 1921
Deputy President	Manohar Lal	3 November 1921	27 October 1923
Ex-Officio Member	Sundar Singh Majithia	8 January 1921	27 October 1923
Secretary to Council	T. P. Ellis	8 January 1921	27 October 1923

== Election schedule ==
Event	Date
Filing of Nominations	5 November 1920
Scrutiny of Nominations	9 November 1920
Polling	? December 1920
Counting	? December 1920

- Election schedule in special constituencies were not same and the dates were different, unfortunately not available.

== Constituency wise result ==
Candidate Elected Unopposed

General-Urban

S. No.	Constituency	Winner
1	Lahore City	Ganpat Rai
2	Amritsar City	Bhawani Shankar
3	South-Eastern Towns	Atma Ram
4	North-Eastern Towns	Panna Lal
5	East-Western Towns	Daulat Ram Kalia
6	North-Western Towns	Thakur Das
7	Western Punjab	Hari Chand

General-Rural

S. No.	Constituency	Winner
8	Hissar	Lajpat Rai
9	South-Eastern Rohtak	Sarup Singh
10	North-Eastern Rohtak	Lal Chad
11	Gurgaon	Balbir Singh
12	Karnal	Bans Gopal
13	Ambala-Simla	Daya Ram
14	Kangra	Motilal Kaistha
15	Hoshiarpur	Beli Ram
16	Jullundur-Ludhiana	Mela Ram
17	Lahore-Ferozpur-Sheikhupura	Ganpati Rai
18	Amritsar-Gurdaspur	Kharak Singh
19	Rawalpindi	Amar Das
20	Multan	Sewak Ram

Muhammadan-Urban

S. No.	Constituency	Winner
21	Lahore City	Muharram Ali Chisti
22	Amritsar City	Yusuf Shah
23	Western Punjab Towns	Akbar Khan
24	East West Central Towns	Nawab Din
25	South-Eastern Towns	Mir Mohammed Khan

Muhammadan-Rural

S. No.	Constituency	Winner
26	Gurgaon Hissar	Hayat Khan
27	Ambala	Shafi Ali Khan
28	Hoshiarpur Ludhiana	Rai Wali Khan
29	Ferozpur	Pir Akbar Ali
30	Jullundur	Mohammed Jamil Khan
31	Kangra Gurdaspur	Ali Akbar
32	Lahore	Mohammed Shah Nawaz
33	Amritsar	Nabi Baksh
34	Sialkot	Mohammed Amin
35	Gujranwala	Attullah Khan
36	Sheikhupura	Mohabat Ram
37	Gujarat East	Ghulam Muhammad Warraich
38	Gujarat West	Chaudhary Fazl Ali
39	Shahpur East	Ghulam Mohammed Shah
40	Shahpur West	Firoz Khan Noon
41	Mianwali	Saifullah Khan
42	Attock	S. H. Khan
43	Rawalpindi	Pir Ali Hyder Shah
44	Jehlum	Karimullah Khan
45	Lyallpur North	Amir Khan
46	Lyallpur South	Mehdi Shah
47	Montgomery	Husaini Shah
48	Multan East	Ahmed Yar Khan Daultana
49	Multan West	Raza Shah Gilani
50	Jhang	Hussain Shah
51	Muzaffargarh	Abdullah Khan
52	Dera Gazi Khan	Allah Khan Drishak

Sikh-Urban

S. No.	Constituency	Winner
53	Sikh Urban	Mehtab Singh

Sikh-Rural

S. No.	Constituency	Winner
54	Ambala Division	Rasa Singh
55	Hoshiarpur Kangara	Bakhtawar Singh
56	Jullundur	Balwant Singh
57	Ludhiana	Dasaundha Singh
58	Ferozpur	Kartar Singh
59	Lahore	Sangat Singh
60	Amritsar	Raghbir Singh
61	Sialkot Gurdaspur	Randhir Singh
62	Lyallpur	Dilbagh Singh
63	Multan Shekhupura	Bedi Hara Singh
64	Rawalpindi Gujranwala	Harnam Singh

Special

S. No.	Constituency	Winner
Landholders
65	Punjab (General)	Raja Narendra Nath
66	Punjab (Muhammadan)	Fazl-i-Husain
67	Punjab (Sikh)	Hardit Singh Bali
Tumandars
68	Baluch Tumandars	Jamal Khan Leghari
University
69	Punjab; Universities	Manohar Lal
Commerce and Trade
70	Punjab Commerce and Trade	Edward E. Clarke
Industry
71	Punjab; Industries	Harkishan Lal

== See also ==
Punjab legislative council (British India)
