= 1923 Punjab Legislative Council election =

Council Elections in British India

1923 Punjab Provincial Legislative Council election
- 1923

71 seats in the Punjab Legislative Council
- Turnout: 52.82% (▲18.01%)
| | First party | Second party |
|---|---|---|
| Party | Unionist | SP |
| Seats won | 33 | 12 |
| Seat change | New | New |
| | Third party | Fourth party |
| Party | SGPC | Independent |
| Seats won | 9 | 17 |
| Seat change | New | ▼54 |

Legislative Council elections were held in Punjab Province in British India in late 1923. They were the second legislative council elections held in the province under the Government of India Act 1919. The newly elected Council was constituted on 2 January 1924 when its first meeting was held.

Sheikh Abdul Qadir was elected as its president. He resigned from the office when he was appointed as Minister of Education and was succeeded by Shahab-ud-din. The Council held its last meeting on 25 October 1926 and was dissolved on 27 October. It held 102 meetings.

== Distribution of seats ==
| Category | Urban | Rural | Total |
|---|---|---|---|
| General | 7 | 13 | 20 |
| Mohammadans | 5 | 27 | 32 |
| Sikh | 1 | 11 | 12 |
| Special^ | - | - | 7 |
| Total | 13 | 51 | 71 |

Special^ (Non-Territorial)

- Punjab Landholders - 3
  - General - 1
  - Mohammadan - 1
  - Sikh - 1
- Baluch Tumandars - 1
- Punjab Universities - 1
- Punjab Commerce and Trade - 1
- Punjab Industry - 1

== Voter Statistics ==
- Total Voters = 6,15,503
- Vote Turnout = 52.82%
- Territorial Constituencies voters - 6,10,199
  - Highest Number of voters - 21,309 in Jehlum (Muhammadan-Rural)
  - Lowest Number of voters - 1,652 in Gurgaon (General-Rural)
  - Highest Turnout - 72.8% in East West Central Towns (General-Urban)
  - Lowest Turnout - 14.6% in Lahore (Sikh-Rural)
- Non-Territorial Constituencies voters - 5,304
  - Highest Number of voters - 2,398 in Punjab Universities
  - Lowest Number of voters - 11 in Baluch Tumandars
  - Highest Turnout - 84.4% in Punjab Universities
  - Lowest Turnout - 72.4% in Punjab Landholders (Sikh)

== Office bearer ==
| Post | Holder | Tenure | |
|---|---|---|---|
| President | Herbert Alexander Casson | 2 January 1924 | 16 January 1925 |
| President | Sheikh Abdul Qadir | 16 January 1925 | 4 September 1925 |
| President | Shahab-ud-Din Virk | 3 December 1925 | 27 October 1926 |
| Deputy President | Sheikh Abdul Qadir | 5 January 1924 | 16 January 1925 |
| Deputy President | Mohinder Singh | 5 March 1925 | 27 October 1926 |

Ex-Officio Members

| Name | Member of Department |
|---|---|
| John Maynard | Finance |

Ministers

| Name | Member of Department |
|---|---|
| Chottu Ram | Agriculture and Education |
| Chaudhary Lal Chand | Agriculture |
| Sundar Singh Majithia | Revenue |
| Mian Fazl-i-Husain | Education |
| Jogendra Singh | Agriculture |

== Election schedule ==
| Event | Date |
|---|---|
| Filing of Nominations | 1 November 1923 |
| Scrutiny of Nominations | 6 November 1923 |
| Polling | 20 and 28 November 1923 |
| Counting | ? December 1923 |

- Election schedule in special constituencies were not same and the dates were different, unfortunately not available.

== Results ==
| Party | Seats | +/– |
|---|---|---|
| Unionist Party | 33 | New |
| Swaraj Party | 12 | New |
| Shiromani Gurdwara Parbandhak Committee | 9 | New |
| Independents | 17 | –54 |
| Total | 71 | 0 |
Source: Yadav

== Constituency wise result ==
Candidate Elected Unopposed

General-Urban

| S. No. | Constituency | Winner |
|---|---|---|
| 1 | Lahore City | Nihal Chand |
| 2 | Amritsar City | Diwan Chand |
| 3 | South-Eastern Towns | Banke Rai |
| 4 | North-Eastern Towns | Mohan Lal |
| 5 | East-Western Towns | Dhan Raj |
| 6 | North-Western Towns | Gokul Chand |
| 7 | Western Punjab | Bodh Raj |

General-Rural

| S. No. | Constituency | Winner |
|---|---|---|
| 8 | Hissar | Sham Lal |
| 9 | South-Eastern Rohtak | Chottu Ram |
| 10 | North-Eastern Rohtak | Lal Chand |
| 11 | Gurgaon | Pohap Singh |
| 12 | Karnal | Duli Chand |
| 13 | Ambala-Simla | Ganga Ram |
| 14 | Kangra | Ram Singh |
| 15 | Hoshiarpur | Nanak Chand |
| 16 | Jullundur-Ludhiana | Bhagat Ram |
| 17 | Lahore-Ferozpur-Sheikhupura | Mohan Lal Bhagat |
| 18 | Amritsar-Gurdaspur | Kesar Singh |
| 19 | Rawalpindi | Narain Das |
| 20 | Multan | Sewak Ram |

Muhammadan-Urban

| S. No. | Constituency | Winner |
|---|---|---|
| 21 | Lahore City | Abdul Aziz Marwada |
| 22 | Amritsar City | Mohammed Sharif |
| 23 | Western Punjab Towns | Abdul Qadir |
| 24 | East West Central Towns | Mazhar Ali Azhar |
| 25 | South-Eastern Towns | Feroz-ud-Din |

Muhammadan-Rural

| S. No. | Constituency | Winner |
|---|---|---|
| 26 | Gurgaon Hissar | Shahid Daad Khan |
| 27 | Ambala | Shafi Ali Khan |
| 28 | Hoshiarpur Ludhiana | Afzal Haq |
| 29 | Ferozpur | Nasib-ud-Din Khan |
| 30 | Jullundur | Sadaullah Khan |
| 31 | Kangra Gurdaspur | Ali Akbar |
| 32 | Lahore | Mohammed Shah Nawaz |
| 33 | Amritsar | Maqbool Mahmud |
| 34 | Sialkot | Shahab-ud-Din |
| 35 | Gujranwala | Karam Illahi |
| 36 | Sheikhupura | Khan Mohammed Khan |
| 37 | Gujarat East | Fazl Ali |
| 38 | Gujarat West | Ghulam Mohammed |
| 39 | Shahpur East | Firoz Khan Noon |
| 40 | Shahpur West | Mohammed Khan Tiwana |
| 41 | Mianwali | Saifullah Khan |
| 42 | Attock | Sikandar Hayat Khan |
| 43 | Rawalpindi | Farman Ali Khan |
| 44 | Jehlum | Mohammed Mehar Shah |
| 45 | Lyallpur North | Shahadat Khan |
| 46 | Lyallpur South | Nur-ud-Dim |
| 47 | Montgomery | Husaini Shah |
| 48 | Multan East | Mohammed Haibat Khan |
| 49 | Multan West | Raza Shah Gilani |
| 50 | Jhang | Hussain Shah |
| 51 | Muzaffargarh | Abdullah Khan |
| 52 | Dera Gazi Khan | Faiz Mohammed |

Sikh-Urban

| S. No. | Constituency | Winner |
|---|---|---|
| 53 | Sikh Urban | Jodh Singh |

Sikh-Rural

| S. No. | Constituency | Winner |
|---|---|---|
| 54 | Ambala Division | Gurbaksh Singh |
| 55 | Hoshiarpur Kangara | Narinder Singh |
| 56 | Jullundur | Partap Singh Shankar |
| 57 | Ludhiana | Mohinder Singh |
| 58 | Ferozpur | Tara Singh |
| 59 | Lahore | Sangat Singh |
| 60 | Amritsar | Dhan Singh |
| 61 | Sialkot Gurdaspur | Randhir Singh |
| 62 | Lyallpur | Harchand Singh |
| 63 | Multan Shekhupura | Buta Singh |
| 64 | Rawalpindi Gujranwala | Narain Singh |

Special

| S. No. | Constituency | Winner |
Landholders
| 65 | Punjab (General) | Raja Narendra Nath |
| 66 | Punjab (Muhammadan) | Fazl-i-Husain |
| 67 | Punjab (Sikh) | Mangal Singh |
Tumandars
| 68 | Baluch Tumandars | Jamal Khan Leghari |
University
| 69 | Punjab; Universities | Ruchi Ram |
Commerce and Trade
| 70 | Punjab Commerce and Trade | V. F. Gray |
Industry
| 71 | Punjab; Industries | Dhanpat Rai |

== See also ==
Punjab legislative council (British India)
