= 2023 Golden Temple blasts =

2023 building bombings in India

- Location: Heritage Street, near the Golden Temple, Amritsar, Punjab, India
- Date: 7–10 May 2023
- Attack type: Bombing
- Weapon: Low-grade explosives packed in "Hell" energy drink cans
- Deaths: 0
- Injuries: 6
- Perpetrator: Unknown
- No. of participants: Unknown 5 arrested as of 11 May 2023
- Motive: Unknown
- Verdict: Investigation ongoing
- Convictions: None

The Golden Temple in Amritsar, India, was damaged by the first blast that happened on 7 May 2023, and by the second blast that happened on 8 May 2023. At midnight on 10 May 2023 a third blast occurred. The explosions were triggered by low-grade explosives without detonators, despite the police's initial claim that they could have been unintentional.

== The blasts ==
The explosives used in the two explosions, according to police sources, were housed in two 250 ml cans of the health drink "Hell." When these were dropped from a height or hurled, the cans burst. There was no sign of a detonator, and the explosives appeared to have been locally built and were unsophisticated.

The explosives can appear to have been put atop a structure in the first event and had a string attached to it that was thrown over the wall. Unknowingly pulling the line, a person, whose identity police have suppressed, caused the can to fall down and set off the explosion. In the second event, it appears that the can was tossed from a height when the explosion occurred.

== Reactions ==
After the explosions, senior police officers as well as members of the Bomb Detection and Disposal Squad arrived at the scene. Harjinder Singh Dhami, the president of the Shiromani Gurdwara Parbandhak Committee (SGPC), urged the Punjab government and the police to fully examine these instances and unearth the truth so that pilgrims could offer their respects without fear.
