= Khalid Mahmood Ranjha =

Pakistani politician

Member of the Provincial Assembly of Punjab
- Incumbent
- Assumed office 24 February 2024

Personal details
- Party: PMLN (2013-present)

Khalid Mahmood Ranjha is a Pakistani politician who has been a Member of the Provincial Assembly of the Punjab since 2024. He has been appointed as Parliamentary Secretary for Law & Parliamentary Affairs.

He was elected to the Provincial Assembly of the Punjab as a candidate of the Pakistan Muslim League (N) from constituency PP-42 Mandi Bahauddin-III in the 2024 Pakistani general election. He belongs to a well known Political family of Mandi Bahauddin. Khalid Mahmood Ranjha is a retired District and Session Judge, he is amongst the well established jurists. His Paternal uncle Chaudhry Irshadullah Ranjha was elected as MLA Member Punjab Legislative Council (British India) in the 1937 Punjab Provincial Assembly election and for the second term in the 1951 Punjab provincial election. His elder Paternal uncle Nazir Hussain Ranjha was elected as MLA Member Punjab Legislative Council (British India) in the 1930 Punjab Legislative Council election and has also served as Bureaucrat Home secretary of Punjab and afterwards he served as Attorney General Highcourt West Pakistan. His elder brother Altaf Ahmed Ranjha was elected as MPA from Pakistan People's Party in the 1988 Pakistani general election. His Paternal cousin Chaudhry Ikramullah Ranjha was elected as MPA from Pakistan Muslim League (N) in the 1985 Pakistani general election and for the second term in the 1990 Pakistani general election. His elder Paternal cousin Chaudhry Ehsanullah Ranjha was elected as Chairmain District Council Gujrat, Pakistan. His nephew Fazal Ahmed Ranjha was elected as MPA from Pakistan Muslim League in the 2002 Punjab provincial election. His other nephew Khurram Ehsan Ranjha was elected as Member District council Mandi Bahauddin for two consecutive terms and his maternal cousin Mohsin Shahnawaz Ranjha was elected as MNA in the 2013 Pakistani general election and for the second term in the 2018 Pakistani general election. Moreover, he served as Minister of State for Parliamentary Affairs, in Abbasi cabinet from October 2017 to May 2018.
