= Balwant Singh Nandgarh =

Indian Sikh leader (died 2024)

Balwant Singh Nandgarh (1943/1944 – 5 January 2024) was an Indian Sikh politician and Jathedar of Takht Sri Damdama Sahib, one of five seats of temporal authority of Sikhism.

Balwant Singh was a farmer in Nandgarh, Bathinda, Punjab, India. In 1997, he became a member of Shiromani Gurdwara Parbandhak Committee (SGPC). According to Gurcharan Singh Tohra, Nandgarh was given ticket to contest elections for SGPC because he was the only applicant to introduce himself as "Khalsa". In 2003, he was made the Jathedar of Takht Sri Damdama Sahib. In 2007, Gurmeet Ram Rahim Singh, head of Dera Sacha Sauda had appeared in an advertisement dressed up as Guru Gobind Singh, 10th Sikh guru. This resulted in widespread clashes between Dera followers and Sikhs. Nandgarh formed a Sikh group called Ek Noor Khalsa Fauj to stop the religious gathering of Dera Sacha Sauda.

== Nanakshahi calendar ==
Nandgarh has supported the 2003 version of Nanakshahi calendar, a solar calendar also known as the Mool Nanakshahi Calendar created by Pal Singh Purewal to determine the dates for various Sikh events. In 1999, this calendar was adopted by SGPC, replacing the lunar Bikrami calendar. However, the Nanakshahi calendar created some confusion, as the dates of some festivals such as Holi and Diwali, and birthdays of Guru Nanak and Guru Gobind Singh differed from the corresponding dates in the Bikrami calendar. In 2009, SGPC amended the calendar and fixed the dates of these festivals according to the Bikrami calendar. In 2014–15, according to the amended Nanakshahi calendar, Guru Gobind Singh's birthday fell on 28 December 2014, which overlaps with the martyrdom day of his younger sons. To resolve this, SGPC announced 7 January 2015 as the new date for celebrating Guru Gobind Singh's birthday. Later, SGPC backtracked and re-announced 28 December 2014 as the date for the event. As per the 2003 Nanakshahi calendar, the date of this event was 5 January. Nandgarh asked people to celebrate the event on 5 January. He was supported by various other Sikh organizations which demanded that the 2003 Nanakshahi calendar should be re-implemented.

Nandgarh's support was seen as going against the SGPC and the ruling party of Punjab Shiromani Akali Dal. In 2011, the Nanakshahi calendar had been released by Ek Noor Khalsa Fauj under the patronage of Nandgarh. On 17 January 2015, Nandgarh was removed from the office of Jathedar by the SGPC. According to SGPC president Avtar Singh Makkar, Nandgarh had violated the Sikh Rehat Maryada (religious code of conducts) and disobeyed certain decisions made by SGPC. Several Sikh organizations such as Dal Khalsa, Shiromani Akali Dal (Amritsar), and Delhi Sikh Gurdwara Management Committee criticized the manner in which Nandgarh was removed from his post.

Nandgarh died on 5 January 2024, at the age of 80.
