= Bakshi Tek Chand =

Indian politician

Member of Constituent Assembly of India
- In office 9 December 1946 – 25 January 1950
- Constituency: Punjab

Member of 3rd Punjab Legislative Council
- In office 3 January 1927 – 23 October 1930

Chairmen of Patents Enquiry Committee
- Appointed by: Government of India

Personal details
- Born: August 26, 1883 Kangra district
- Died: Unknown

Bakshi Tek Chand was an Indian lawyer and jurist from Punjab. He served as a judge in the Punjab High Court during the British Raj, and as a member of the Constituent Assembly of India after independence.

== Personal life ==
He was born in August 26, 1883 in the Kangra district in the then province of Punjab in British India.

== Career ==
He served as a judge in the Punjab High Court in British India.

After his retirement, he was elected to the Constituent Assembly of India in 1946 from the province of Punjab. After the Partition of India, he opted to move to independent India.

In October 1947, the Maharaja of Jammu and Kashmir, having released the popular leader Sheikh Abdullah from prison with the expectation of his participation in the government of the state, appointed Bakshi Tek Chand to frame a constitution for the state. The appointment was on 21 October 1947, one day before the Pakistani tribal invasion of Kashmir was launched, which put a hold on the effort. With the state's accession to India in the wake of the invasion, Bakshi continued to be involved in the negotiations for arranging the state's governance.

== Offices ==
- Member of Constituent Assembly of India
- Member of 3rd Punjab Legislative Council
- Chairman of Patents Enquiry Committee
- Judge of Lahore High Court
- President of Punjab High Court Bar Association.
