= PP-42 Mandi Bahauddin-III =

Constituency of the Punjabi Provincial Legislature, Pakistan

- Constituency for the Provincial Assembly of Punjab
- Region: Phalia Tehsil (partly) including Qadirabad Town, Mandi Bahauddin Tehsil (partly) and Malakwal Tehsil (partly) in Mandi Bahauddin District

Current constituency
- Created from: PP-11 Gujrat-XI (1951-55); PP-36 Gujrat-XII (1985-1990); PP-101 Mandi Bahauddin-III (1990-2002); PP-118 Mandi Bahauddin-III (2002-2018); PP-67 Mandi Bahauddin-III (2018-2023)

PP-42 Mandi Bahauddin-III (پی پی-42،منڈی بہاؤالدین-3) is a Constituency of Mandi Bahauddin District it's Tehsil is Phalia for the Provincial Assembly of Punjab.

== General elections 2024 ==
Provincial election 2024: PP-42 Mandi Bahauddin-III
Party	Candidate	Votes	%	±%
PML(N)	Khalid Mahmood Ranjha	50,506	38.14	
Independent	Sajid Ahmad Khan (Note: Filed nomination papers as PTI candidate but ECP allowed him to run as an independent)	42,622	32.20	
Independent	Chaudhary Ghulam Hussain Bosal	12,532	9.47	
TLP	Zafar Iqbal	6,784	5.13	
Independent	Liaqat Ali Ranjha	4,840	3.66	
PPP	Fakhar Umar Hayat	3,779	2.86	
Others	Others (fifteen candidates)	11,217	8.45	
Turnout		148,361	50.37	
Total valid votes		132,280	89.23	
Rejected ballots		15,982	10.77	
Majority		7,983	6.03	
Registered electors		294,015		
hold				

== General elections 2018 ==
Provincial election 2018: PP-67 Mandi Bahauddin-III
Party	Candidate	Votes	%	±%
Independent	Sajid Ahmad Khan	60,233	46.30	
PTI	Shahid Naseem Tahir	25,531	19.63	
PML(N)	Sikandar Hayat	19,048	14.64	
Independent	Liaqat Ali Ranjha	11,852	9.11	
PPP	Faisal Shahzad	5,921	4.55	
TLI	Nasrullah Khan	4,853	3.73	
Others	Others (eight candidates)	2,650	2.04	
Turnout		139,958	56.66	
Total valid votes		130,088	92.95	
Rejected ballots		9,870	7.05	
Majority		34,702	26.67	
Registered electors		247,029		

== General elections 2013 ==
Provincial election 2013: PP-118 Mandi Bahauddin-III
Party	Candidate	Votes	%	±%
PML(Q)	Monas Elahi	39,353	53.17	
PML(N)	Sakindar Hayat Gondal	16,348	22.09	
PTI	Liaquat Ali Ranjha	12,703	17.16	
Independent	Shahid Naseem Gondal	3,234	4.37	
Others	Others (nine candidates)	2,372	3.21	
Turnout		76,061	57.31	
Total valid votes		74,010	97.30	
Rejected ballots		2,051	2.70	
Majority		23,009	31.08	
Registered electors		132,724		

== General elections 2008 ==
Maj(R) Zulfiqar Ali Gondal won 2008 Pakistani general election Mandi Bahauddin-III (PP-118 at that time) as a candidate of Pakistan Peoples Party (Parliamentarian).

Provincial election 2008: PP-118 Mandi Bahauddin-III
Party	Candidate	Votes	%	±%
PML(Q)	Ch. Pervaiz Elahi	30,736	51.67	
PPP	Fazal Ahmed Ranjha	23,368	39.28	
PML(N)	Sikandar Hayat Gondal	4,545	7.64	
Independent	Raisa	405	0.68	
Independent	Major (R) Zulifqar Ali Gondal	207	0.35	
Independent	Fouzia Waqar	202	0.34	
MMA	Nadeem Akhtar Tabsum	22	0.04	
Turnout		61,119	56.32	
Total valid votes		59,485	97.33	
Rejected ballots		1,634	2.67	
Majority		7,368	12.39	
Registered electors		108,512		

== General elections 2002 ==
Chaudhry Fazal Ahmed Ranjha won 2002 Pakistani general election from Mandi Bahauddin-III (PP-118) as a candidate of Pakistan Muslim League.

== General elections 1997 ==
Chaudhry Imtiaz Ahmed Ranjha won 1997 Pakistani general election from Mandi Bahauddin-III (PP-101) as a candidate of Pakistan Muslim League (N)

== General elections 1993 ==
Ahmad Yar Gondal won 1993 Pakistani general election from Mandi Bahauddin-III (PP-101) as a candidate of Pakistan Muslim League (N)

== General elections 1990 ==
Chaudhry Ikramullah Ranjha won 1990 Pakistani general election from Gujrat-XII (PP-101) as a candidate of Islami Jamhoori Ittehad

== General elections 1988 ==
Chaudhry Altaf Ahmad Ranjha won 1988 Pakistani general election from Gujrat-XII (PP-101) as a candidate of Pakistan People's Party

== General elections 1985 ==
Chaudhry Ikramullah Ranjha won 1985 Pakistani general election from Gujrat-XII (PP-36) as a candidate of Pakistan Muslim League (N)

== General elections 1951 ==
Chaudhry Irshadullah Ranjha won 1951 Punjab provincial election from Gujrat-XI as a member of Punjab Legislative Assembly

== General elections 1937 ==
Chaudhry Irshadullah Ranjha won 1937 Punjab Provincial Assembly election from (Gujrat West — Muhammadan,. Rural) as a member of Punjab Legislative Assembly

== General elections 1930 ==
Chaudhry Nazir Husain Ranjha won 1930 Punjab Legislative Council election from (Gujrat West — Muhammadan,. Rural) as a member of Punjab Legislative Assembly

== See also ==
- NA-69 Mandi Bahauddin-II
