= Punjab Legislative Council (British India) =

Unicameral legislature of British Punjab (1921–1936)

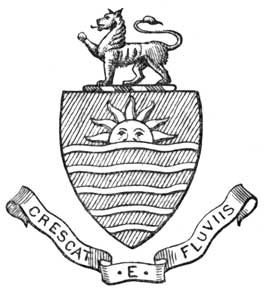

Type
- Type: Upper house
- Houses: Punjab Legislative Council
- Term limits: 3 years

History
- Founded: 8 January 1921
- Disbanded: 10 November 1936
- Preceded by: Lieutenant Governor's Council of British Punjab
- Succeeded by: Punjab Legislative Assembly

Leadership
- President: Montagu Sherard Dawes Butler (First)
- Chottu Ram (Last)
- Deputy President: Mehtab Singh (First)
- Buta Singh (Last)
- Seats: Total-93; Elected-71; Nominated-22

Elections
- First election: 1920
- Last election: 1930

Constitution
- Government of India Act 1919

The Punjab Legislative Council was the unicameral legislature of British Punjab, a province of the British Raj. It was established in 1921 by the British authorities under Government of India Act 1919, the council had nominal powers and a membership of mainly pro-British politicians and government officials. Voting was largely boycotted until the Government of India Act 1935 increased representation and the powers of the assembly. It was dissolved in 1936 and was succeeded by Punjab Provincial Assembly.

The First World War gave the momentum to the growing demand for self-government in British India. Therefore, the new constitutional reforms, under the Montagu–Chelmsford Reforms were introduced by British Government. The scheme was implemented through the Government of India Act 1919. The first Council was constituted on 8 January 1921 for the first time. The election for first Council was held in December 1920. 71 members were elected and 22 were nominated by Governor and the last election held in 1930 and the council disbanded in 1936

== Presidents ==
Color key for the presidential party

- Non-Partisan
- Unionist Party

List of presidents

S. No.	Name	Party	Tenure		Council
1	Montagu Sherard Dawes Butler	Non-Partisan	8 January 1921	21 March 1922	1st
2	Herbert Alexander Casson	Non-Partisan	10 May 1922	27 October 1923	1st
2	Herbert Alexander Casson	Non-Partisan	2 January 1924	16 January 1925	2nd
3	Abdul Qadir	Unionist Party	16 January 1925	4 September 1925	2nd
4	Shahab-ud-Din Virk	Unionist Party	3 December 1925	27 October 1926	2nd
4	Shahab-ud-Din Virk	Unionist Party	4 January 1927	26 July 1930	3rd
4	Shahab-ud-Din Virk	Unionist Party	25 October 1930	24 July 1936	4th
5	Chottu Ram	Unionist Party	20 October 1936	10 November 1936	4th

== Deputy President ==
Council	Name	Tenure	
1st	Mehtab Singh	23 February 1921	24 October 1921
1st	Manohar Lal	3 November 1921	27 October 1923
2nd	Sheikh Abdul Qadir	5 January 1924	16 January 1925
2nd	Mohinder Singh	5 March 1925	27 October 1926
3rd	Buta Singh	5 January 1927	21 July 1927
3rd	Habibullah	21 July 1927	26 July 1930
4th	Harbaksh Singh	8 November 1930	17 January 1931
4th	Buta Singh	2 March 1931	10 November 1936

== First Council ==
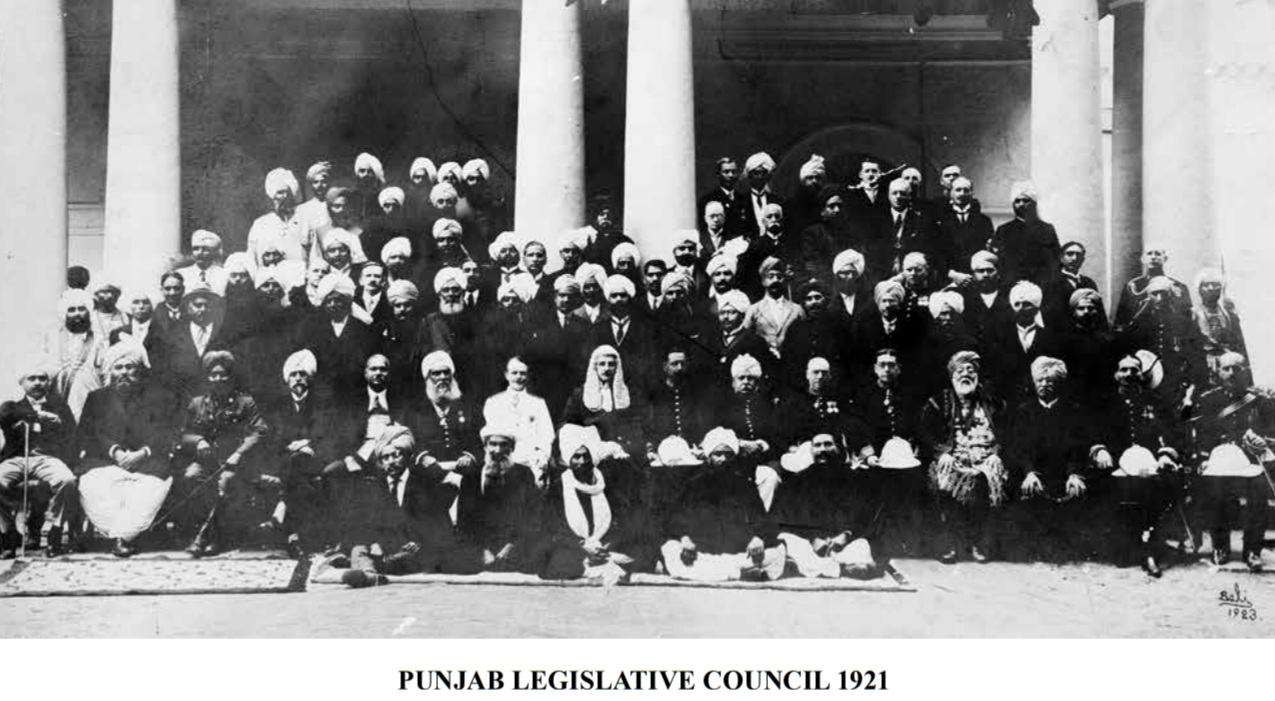
Group Photo of Members of First Punjab Legislative Council.

The first Punjab Legislative Council was formed in 1921 for a three-year term. The Council had 93 members, seventy per cent of whom were elected and rest nominated.

An elected president presided over meetings of the Council. The first Punjab Legislative Council held 98 meetings between 8 January 1921 and 27 October 1923.

Notable members included:

- Sir Montagu Butler (President)
- Herbert Alexander Casson (President)
- Manohar Lal (Lahore — Punjab University)
- Sir Fazl-i-Husain (Elected — Muhammadan Landholders)
- Sikandar Hayat Khan (Punjabi politician) (Wah, Attock — Muhammadan, Rural)
- Sundar Singh Majithia (Ex-officio member, Member Executive Council)
- Feroz Khan Noon (Shahpur West — (Muhammadan), Rural)
- Chhotu Ram (South East Rohtak (Non-Muhammadan)
- Mian Muhammad Shahnawaz (Lahore, Lahore — Muhammadan, Rural)

== Second Council ==
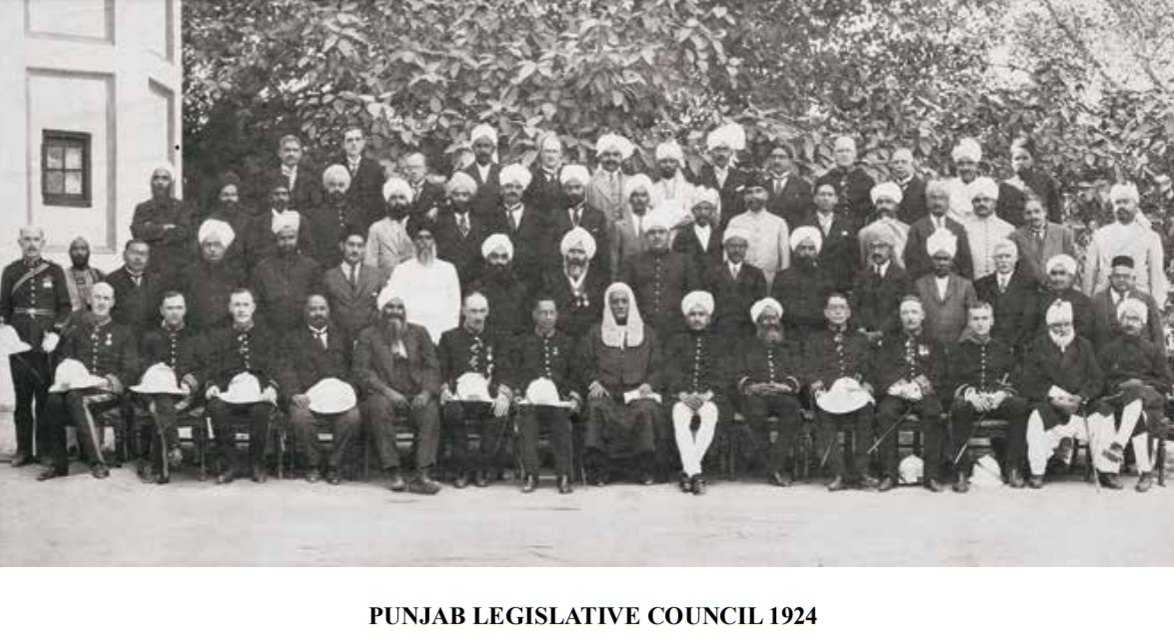
Group photo of Members of Second Punjab Legislative Assembly in 1924.

The second Legislative Council was constituted on 2 January 1924 and held 102 meetings until it was dissolved on 27 October 1926.

Sir Sheikh Abdul Qadir was the first elected and the first Muslim President of this Council. He resigned in September 1925 when he was appointed Minister for Education, and was succeeded by Sir Shahab-ud-Din Virk.

Notable members included:

- Sir George Anderson (Director of Public Instruction, Punjab)
- Herbert Alexander Casson (President)
- Sir Shahab-ud-Din Virk (President)
- Sir Sheikh Abdul Qadir (President)
- Manohar Lal (Lahore — Punjab University)
- Sir Fazl-i-Husain (Minister for Education, Revenue Member — Muhammadan Landholders)
- Sikandar Hayat Khan (Attock — Muhammadan, Rural)
- Sundar Singh Majithia (Revenue Member)
- John Maynard (Leader of the House, Finance Member)
- Jogendra Singh (Sikh Landholders, Minister for Agriculture)
- Chhotu Ram (South East Rohtak — Non-Muhammadan, Rural, Minister for Agriculture, Education)

== Third Council ==
The third Legislative Council sat between 3 January 1927 and 26 July 1930, during which is held 111 meetings. Sir Shahab-ud-Din Virk was re-elected President on 4 January 1927.

Notable members included:

- Sir George Anderson (Director of Public Instruction, Punjab)
- Sir Sheikh Abdul Qadir (Representative, General Interests)
- Sir Henry Craik (Finance Member Government of Punjab)
- Sir Geoffrey Fitzhervey de Montmorency (Finance Member to Government, Punjab)
- Herbert Emerson (Secretary to Government Punjab, Finance Department)
- Sir Fazl-i-Husain Revenue Member to Government Punjab
- Sir Muhammad Iqbal (Lahore City — Muhammadan, Urban)
- Sikandar Hayat Khan (Muhammadan — Landholders)
- Manohar Lal (Punjab University) — Minister for Education
- Feroz Khan Noon (Shahpur East — Muhammadan, Rural) — Minister for Local Self-Government
- Chhotu Ram (Hissar — Non-Muhammadan, Rural)
- Sir Jogendra Singh (Sikh Landholders) — Minister for Agriculture
- Sir Shahab-ud-Din Virk (President)

== Fourth Council ==
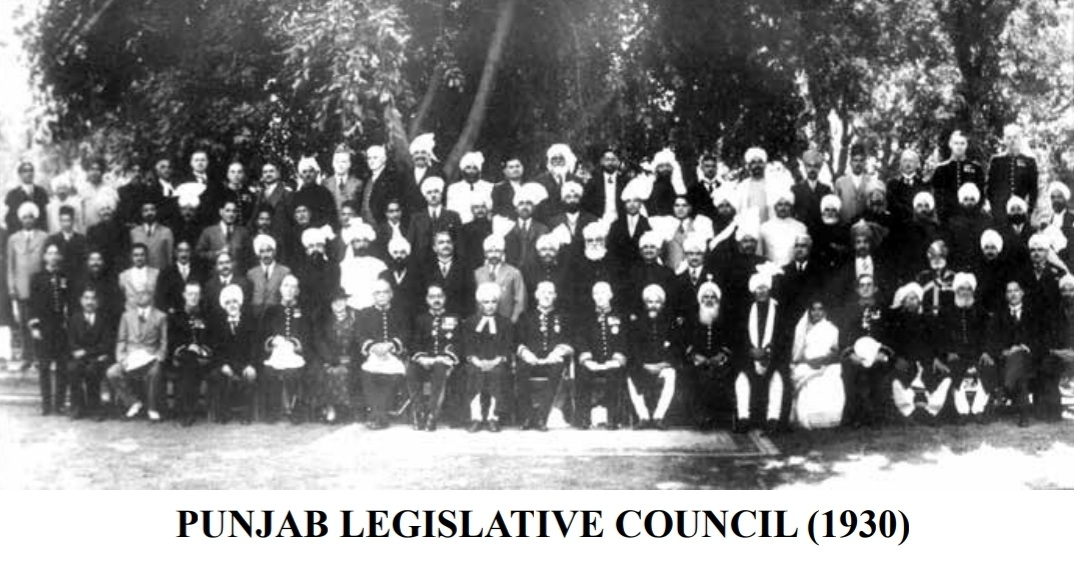
Group photo of Members of Fourth Punjab Legislative Council.

The fourth and the last Legislative Council was constituted on 25 October 1930 and held 197 meetings until it was dissolved on 17 November 1935. Sir Shahab-ud-Din Virk was reelected unopposed as President for a third term. He resigned when he was appointmed Minister for Education and was succeeded by Sir Chhotu Ram.

Notable members included:

- Sir George Anderson (Director of Public Instruction, Punjab)
- Mazhar Ali Azhar (East and West Central Towns — Muhammadan, Urban)
- Sir Henry Craik (Finance Member to Government, Punjab)
- Mushtaq Ahmed Gurmani (Representative of General Interest)
- Nazir Husain Ranjha (Gujrat West — Muhammadan, Rural)
- Sir Fazl-i-Husain Minister for Education
- Miles Irving (Finance Member, Minister Revenue previously worked as Financial Commissioner)
- Sikandar Hayat Khan (Revenue Member to Government, Punjab)
- Manohar Lal (Punjab University)
- Shahnawaz Khan Mamdot (Representative of General Interest)
- Feroz Khan Noon (Shahpur East — Muhammadan, Rural) — Minister for Education
- Chhotu Ram (President)
- Sir Jogendra Singh (Sikh, Landholders — Minister for Agriculture)
- Arjan Singh(Sikh, MLC Hoshiarpur and Kangra 1936)
- Sir Shahab-ud-Din Virk (President)

== See also ==
- 1920 Punjab Legislative Council election
- 1923 Punjab Legislative Council election
- 1926 Punjab Legislative Council election
- 1930 Punjab Legislative Council election
