= Herbert Casson =

Herbert Casson may refer to:

- Herbert Newton Casson (1869–1951), Canadian journalist and author
- Herbert Alexander Casson (1867–1952), British administrator in the Indian Civil Service
