= Partap Singh Shankar =

Indian politician

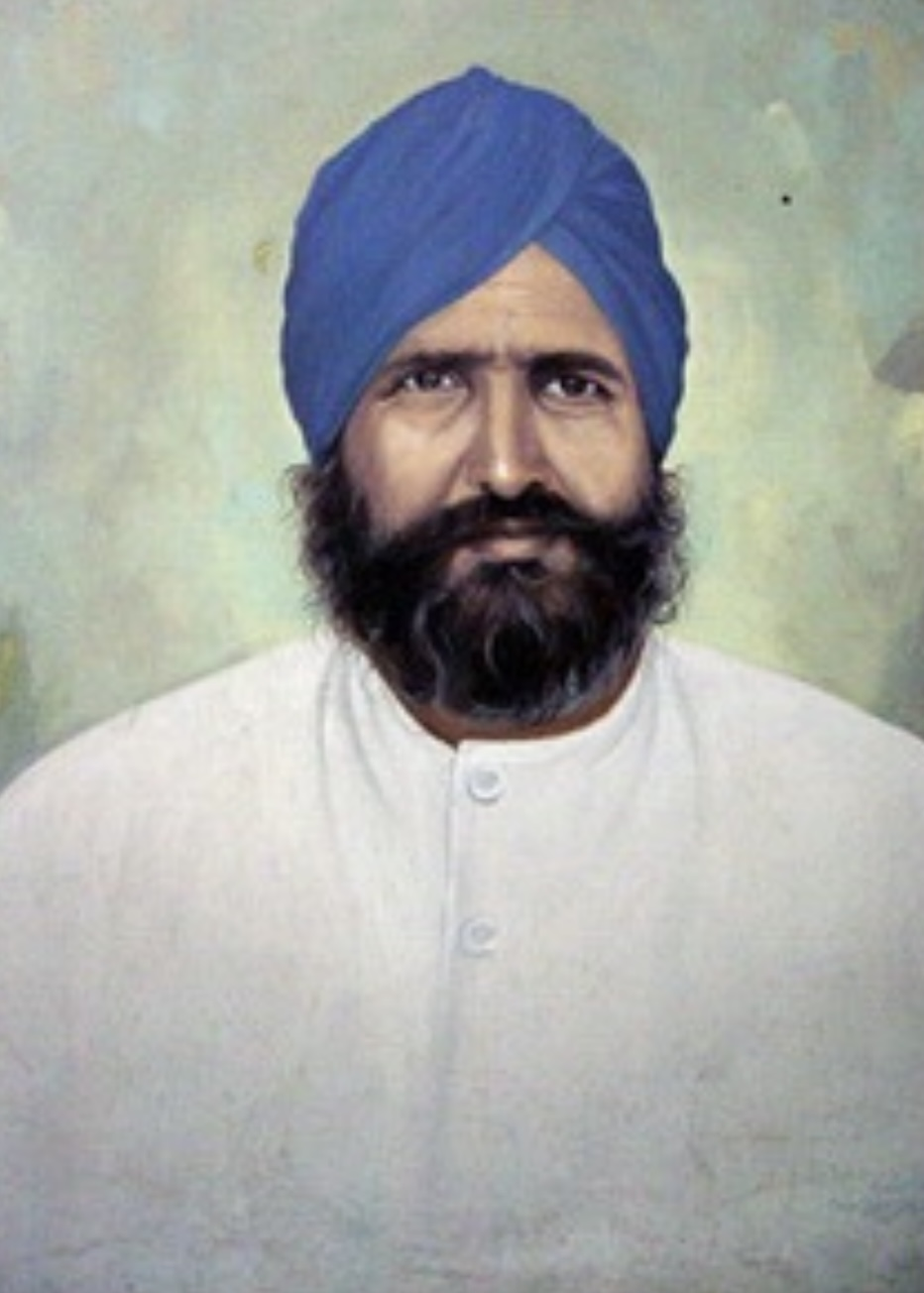

President of Shiromani Gurdwara Prabandhak Committee
- In office 18 June 1933 – 13 June 1936
- Preceded by: Gopal Singh Qaumi
- Succeeded by: Tara Singh

Member of Punjab Legislative Council
- In office 1923 – 1930
- Preceded by: Balwant Singh
- Succeeded by: Gurbachan Singh
- Constituency: Jullundar (Sikh-Rural)

Personal details
- Born: N/A
- Died: N/A

Sardar Partap Singh Shankar was an active member of Gurdwara Reform Movement.

He born in Sharikar Village at Jalandhar and also served as viceroy commissioned in Punjab army at Jalandhar. Partap Singh was the father of India's first Defence Minister Swaran Singh. Partap Singh assumed the Public office in 1933 after Gopal Singh Quami's one day tenure as SGPC president. He also won 1923 and 1926 Punjab Legislative Council election from Jullundar (Sikh-Rural) constituency.
