= Swaran Singh =

Indian politician (1907–1994)

Sardar Swaran Singh
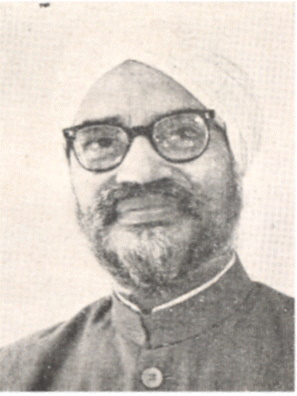
- Swaran Singh Lok Sabha portrait

Union Minister of Defence
- In office 10 October 1974 – 1 December 1975
- Prime Minister: Indira Gandhi
- Preceded by: Jagjivan Ram
- Succeeded by: Indira Gandhi
- In office 13 November 1966 – 27 June 1970
- Prime Minister: Indira Gandhi
- Preceded by: Yashwantrao Chavan
- Succeeded by: Jagjivan Ram

Union Minister of External Affairs
- In office 27 June 1970 – 10 October 1974
- Prime Minister: Indira Gandhi
- Preceded by: Dinesh Singh
- Succeeded by: Yashwantrao Chavan
- In office 18 July 1964 – 14 November 1966
- Prime Minister: Lal Bahadur Shastri; Indira Gandhi
- Preceded by: Lal Bahadur Shastri
- Succeeded by: M. C. Chagla
Other ministerial positions
Union Minister of Steel and Heavy Engineering
In office 15 November 1969 – 27 June 1970
Prime Minister	Indira Gandhi
Preceded by	C. M. Poonacha
Succeeded by	Bali Ram Bhagat
Union Minister of Industry
In office 9 June 1964 – 19 July 1964
Prime Minister	Lal Bahadur Shastri
Preceded by	Nityanand Kanungo
Succeeded by	H. C. Dasappa
Union Minister of Food and Agriculture
In office 1 September 1963 – 9 June 1964
Prime Minister	Jawaharlal Nehru
Preceded by	S. K. Patil
Succeeded by	Chidambaram Subramaniam
Union Minister of Mines and Fuel
In office 26 June 1963 – 19 July 1963
Prime Minister	Jawaharlal Nehru
Preceded by	Keshav Dev Malviya
Succeeded by	O. V. Alagesan
Union Minister of Railways
In office 10 April 1962 – 21 September 1963
Prime Minister	Jawaharlal Nehru
Preceded by	Jagjivan Ram
Succeeded by	H. C. Dasappa
Union Minister of Steel, Mines and Fuel
In office 17 April 1957 – 10 April 1962
Prime Minister	Jawaharlal Nehru
Succeeded by	Chidambaram Subramaniam
Union Minister of Works, Housing and Supply
In office 13 May 1952 – 17 April 1957
Prime Minister	Jawaharlal Nehru
Preceded by	Narhar Vishnu Gadgil
Succeeded by	K. Chengalaraya Reddy

Member of Parliament, Lok Sabha
- In office 1957–1977
- Preceded by: Amar Nath
- Succeeded by: Iqbal Singh Dhillon
- Constituency: Jullundur

Member of Parliament, Rajya Sabha
- In office 7 October 1952 – 18 March 1957
- Constituency: Punjab

Personal details
- Born: Swaran Singh Purewal; 19 August 1907 Shankar Village, Punjab Province, British India
- Died: 30 October 1994 (aged 87) New Delhi, India
- Cause of death: Cardiac Arrest
- Spouse: Charan Kaur
- Children: Param Panag, Sat Boparai, Iqbal Sidhu, Jasvinder Kaur
- Parent: Sardar Partap Singh Shankar
- Education: Randhir College, Kapurthala, Government College Lahore
- Occupation: Politician

Sardar Swaran Singh (19 August 1907 – 30 October 1994) was an Indian politician. He was India's second longest-serving union cabinet minister after Jagjivan Ram.

== Early life and family ==
Swaran Singh was born on 19 August 1907 in Shankar, Jalandhar district of Punjab, British India. He was born in Sikh family, his father Partap Singh was heavily involved in the Akali Movement and the Shiromani Gurdwara Parbandhak Committee. His father was also a two time MLA from Jalandhar in 1923 and 1926, and served in the British Indian Army.

He completed his intermediate high school at Randhir College in Kapurthala. He then joined Government College, Lahore and completed a degree in Physics with honors. He then worked as a lecturer in physics in Lyallpur Khalsa College. After leaving this job he studied law in Government law college in Lahore and received his L.L.B in 1932. He started a law practice near his birth village in the nearby town of Jalandhar, specialising in criminal law.

He was married to Charan Kaur in 1925, and they had four daughters; of which Dr. Paramjeet Kaur Panag married into the Panag military family, Satwant Kaur Boparai married Swaran Singh Boparai, a soldier, I.A.S. officer and Kirti Chakra awardee of the family of Dr. Sohan Singh (a high ranking medical official turned separatist leader, who was later rehabilitated), Jasvinder Kaur who married Air Marshal Brijpal Singh Sikand and Iqbal Kaur Sidhu who married Gurbakshish Singh Sidhu (G.B.S Sidhu), a high-ranked I.P.S. officer and prominent author.

== Political career ==
=== The early days ===
In 1930s he joined the Akali Dal political party and by the mid forties he was a prominent leader in the mid-1940s. He played an important role in the compromise between the Indian national congress party and the Akali Dal in the early 1940s.

Just before the 1946 elections, the Panthic Party was formed with Baldev Singh as the leader and Singh was elected its deputy leader. In 1946 he was elected a member of the Punjab legislative assembly. He then became parliamentary secretary to the Punjab Coalition government.

He was a member of the Punjab Partition Committee where he played an important role.

On 15 August 1947, the day of Indian Independence he was sworn in as Home Minister in the cabinet of the state of Punjab. At the same time the capital of the Punjab was shifted from Shimla to Jalandhar.

On 13 May 1952 he resigned his position here when Jawaharlal Nehru included him in the central cabinet.

=== In the central government ===
He entered the cabinet of India's first prime minister, Jawaharlal Nehru, in 1952, and was that government's last surviving member.

He spent 23 years of his life as a high ranking Cabinet Minister in the Government of India. He had a reputation for being an effective debater and negotiator. "His debates at the UN Security Council on Bangladesh's cause, when East Pakistan liberation war (1971) was in full swing, were impressive," attests Former Indian ambassador to the United Nations, Narendra P Jain, "He proved to be more than just a match for his then Pakistani counterpart Zulfikar Ali Bhutto. During one of the council debates when Bhutto said that Sardar's hands are full of blood in conflict, Swarn Singh got up and showed his clean, spotless hands." He was familiar with and was a proficient speaker of several languages. He assisted Jawaharlal Nehru in his talks with the Chinese leader Zhou Enlai, on the Indo-China border question in 1960. He was in the Indian delegation during the six rounds of talks with Pakistan in 1962–63.

He remained a part of successive governments until he resigned in November 1975.

He was elected to the Lok Sabha in 1957, 1962, 1967 and 1972.

=== Cabinet positions ===
To this date he is the second longest-serving union cabinet minister in India. Babu Jajgivan Ram holds the record for maximum duration as cabinet minister, i.e., more than 29 years, but the record for longest consistent and uninterrupted membership of the cabinet in continuation is held by Mr. Swaran Singh.

Ministry	Date
Works, Housing and Supplies	1952–1957
Steel Mines and Fuel	1957–1962
Agriculture	1963–1964
Railways	1962–1963
External Affairs	1964–1966
Defence	1966–1970
External Affairs	1970–1974
Defence	1974–1976

He is best known for his role as India's external affairs minister.

He was also president of the National Congress in 1969, and 1978.

=== External Affairs Minister ===
He visited the USSR in July 1966 along with then Prime Minister Indira Gandhi.

On 9 August 1971, he signed "The Treaty of Peace, Friendship and Cooperation between the USSR and the Republic of India" which provided for closer contacts between the two countries in economic, political cultural and other fields. The treaty was also a defense pact under with both countries were obliged to come to each other's assistance in the event a military conflict with a third country occurs. This treaty was binding for 20 years and was co signed by Andrei Gromyko.

He led the Indian delegation to the UN general assembly in 1971 to explain India's position in the ongoing war with Pakistan.

George H. W. Bush, who at the time was the US ambassador to the UN and led the US delegation at the UN Security Council, demanded an unconditional cease fire by India, to which Swaran Singh responded, "this one sided and partisan attitude of the distinguished representative of the United States has shocked and surprised us. The US is entitled to its own opinions and interpretations, so are we. But facts are facts and must be stated. Right from the beginning of this unfortunate situation that has arisen in the subcontinent, India had been asking for a political settlement acceptable to elected and acknowledged representatives of the people of Bangladesh."

On 16 December 1971, East Pakistan troops there surrendered to joint forces of Bangladesh and India, who had seized the capital city of Dacca (now Dhaka).

=== Swaran Singh Committee ===
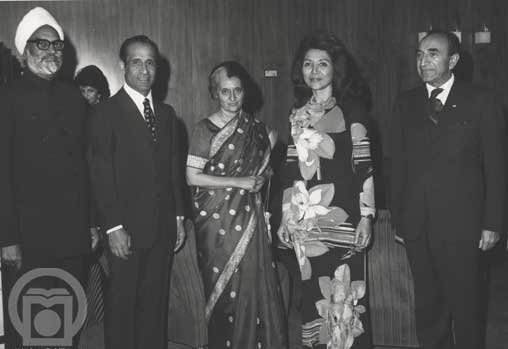
(L-R) Sardar Swaran Singh, Mohammad Amir Khatami, Indira Gandhi, Khatami's wife, and Asadollah Alam during his trip to Iran

Sardar Swaran Singh was chairperson of the committee entrusted with the responsibility of studying the Constitution of India in 1976 during the national emergency. Soon after the declaration of the national emergency, Indira Gandhi constituted a committee under the Chairmanship of Sardar Swaran Singh to study the question of amending the constitution in the light of past experiences. Based on its recommendations, the government incorporated several changes to the Constitution including the Preamble, through the Forty-second Amendment of the Constitution of India (passed in 1976 and came into effect on 3 January 1977).

=== Awards ===
He was awarded Padma Vibhushan award – the second highest civil award by the republic of India in 1992.

=== The Eminent Persons Group on South Africa ===
Sardar Swaran Singh met with Nelson Mandela in prison three times in the mid-1980s. He was a member of the eminent persons group on South Africa sponsored by the Commonwealth Institute that consisted of Malcolm Fraser who had been Prime Minister of Australia for eight years, General Obasanjo of Nigeria, Lord Barber who had been Edward Heath's Chancellor of the Exchequer and was also chairman of the Standard Chartered Bank, Dame Nita Barrow, Reverend Scott and John Malecela, a Tanzanian former government minister. The group went to South Africa and spent five weeks there to collect information, interact with local people, and met with Nelson Mandela and the ANC; their findings were published by the Commonwealth Institute entitled "Mission to South Africa: the Commonwealth Report".

=== UNESCO Boards of Directors ===
Sardar Swaran Singh served as a member of board of directors from 1985 – 1989 for sessions 123 – 132.

Political offices
Preceded by Jagjivan Ram	Minister of Railways; 1962–1963	Succeeded by H. C. Dasappa
Preceded by Lal Bahadur Shastri	Minister for External Affairs of India; 1964–1966	Succeeded by M C Chagla
Preceded by Yashwantrao Chavan	Minister of Defence; 1966–1970	Succeeded by Jagjivan Ram
Preceded by Dinesh Singh	Minister for External Affairs of India; 1970–1974	Succeeded by Yashwantrao Chavan
Preceded by Jagjivan Ram	Minister of Defence; 1974–1975	Succeeded by Bansi Lal
