= Sajid Ahmad Khan =

Pakistani politician

Chairman Public Accounts Committee Punjab
- In office 19 November 2021 – 14 January 2023

Member of the Provincial Assembly of the Punjab
- In office 18 August 2018 – 14 January 2023
- Constituency: PP-67 Mandi Bahauddin-III

Personal details
- Party: PTI (2023-present)
- Other political affiliations: PML(Q) (2018-2023)

Sajid Ahmad Khan is a Pakistani politician who had been a member of the Provincial Assembly of the Punjab from August 2018 till January 2023.

== Political career ==
He was also elected to the Provincial Assembly of Punjab as an independent candidate from PP-67 (Mandi Bahauddin-III) in the 2018 Punjab provincial election.

Following his successful election, he joined Pakistan Muslim League (Q) (PML(Q)).

On 21 February 2023, after the dissolution of the Provincial Assembly, Bhatti, along with former Chief Minister Chaudhry Pervaiz Elahi and eight other former PML(Q) MPAs, joined the Pakistan Tehreek-e-Insaf (PTI).

He ran for a seat in the Provincial Assembly from PP-42 Mandi Bahauddin-III (formerly PP-67) as a candidate of the PTI in the 2024 Punjab provincial election with the symbol of Donkey Cart.
