= Ishar Singh Majhail =

Indian politician and legislator (1901–1977)

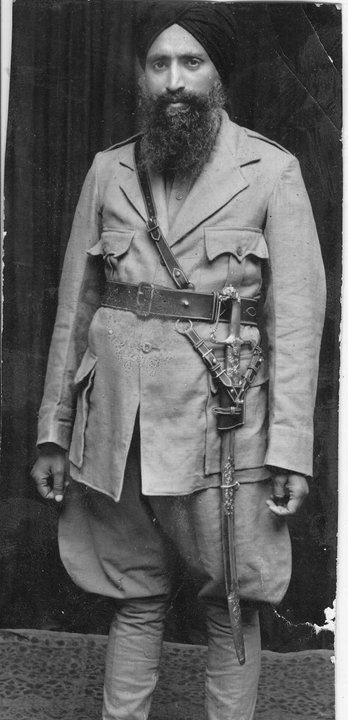
- Ishar Singh Majhail, former president of the SGPC, wearing Sikh jatha uniform in the late 1940s

President of Shiromani Gurdwara Prabandhak Committee
- In office 18 January 1954 – 7 January 1955
- Preceded by: Preetam Singh Khuranj
- Succeeded by: Tara Singh

Member of Punjab Provincial Assembly
- In office 1946 - 1947
- Constituency: Amritsar North (Sikh) (Rural)

Member of Interim East Punjab Assembly
- In office 1947 - 1951
- Constituency: Amritsar North (Sikh) (Rural)

Personal details
- Born: January 1901 Sarai Amanat Khan Village, Amritsar, Punjab)
- Died: 20 April 1977 (aged 76) Chandigarh
- Parent(s): Asa Singh and Basant Kaur

Ishar Singh Majhail (1901-1977) was an Indian politician and legislator from Punjab.

== Early life ==
Ishar Singh Majhail was born in January 1901, the son of Bhai Asa Singh and Mat Basant Kaur, an agriculturist couple of Sarai Amanat Khan village, in Amritsar district. He was only about two and a half years old when his father went abroad to Indonesia in search of a better living. He died in Indonesia soon after and Ishar Singh was brought up by his widowed mother, a deeply dedicated and religiously minded woman.

He completed his high school by fits and starts owing to narrow financial circumstances. He graduated from school in 1922 from Malva Khalsa High School, Ludhiana. Since the last school he attended was Malva Khalsa High School and since he was one of the few students at that school who was from the Majha districts of Amritsar and Lahore, he started using the surname 'Majhail' (of or from Majha), which stuck to him for the rest of his life. He had grown into a handsome young man, though somewhat frail, but fair complexioned and erect with a sharp aquiline nose.

As soon as he had finished school, Ishar Singh received an offer of appointment as a teacher at Kokari Kalari, then in Firozpur district, but he declined it and joined instead the Akali movement for the reformation of Gurdwara management.

== Later life ==
For participating in the Guru ka Bagh campaign (1922), he was sentenced to six months in jail. With his sentence completed Ishar Singh Majhail participated in the Jaito morcha campaign (1923) in which he was again arrested and sentenced to a two-year term. In 1927, he accompanied Baba Vasakha Singh to Burma on a fund collection drive on behalf of the Desh Bhagat Parivar Sahaik Committee. In October 1927, Shahid Sikh Missionary College was set up by the Shiromani Gurdwara Parbandhak Committee to train Sikh preachers, Ishar Singh Majhail joined the college and completed the two year course it offered. But he was soon attracted once again into the political maelstrom. His principal guide, at that time, was Jathedar Udham Singh Nagoke. He took part in the farmers' agitation of 1930 and suffered imprisonment for six months. The term was subsequently extended by another year for being caught with a newspaper while in jail. In 1936 he participated in Gurdwara Shahid Ganj Singh Singhania morcha at Lahore.

When Sikh National College was set up in Lahore in 1938, Ishar Singh Majhail was appointed secretary of its managing committee. During 1940-41 he was president of the managing committee of Sri Darbar Sahib, Amritsar. He was one of the group within the Shiromani Akali Dal which opposed the Dal's policy of assisting the British war effort during WWII. He took part in the Quit India movement launched by the Indian National Congress in 1942 and was detained under Defence of India Rules. In February 1946, he was elected a member of the Punjab Legislative Assembly. In the fifties Tshar Singh Majhail lost interest in active politics and devoted himself to the development of his agricultural farm, in the village of Arno, in Patiala district. His health was also declining and he died on 20 April 1977 at Chandigarh.
