= Avtar Singh Makkar =

Indian politician (1943–2019)

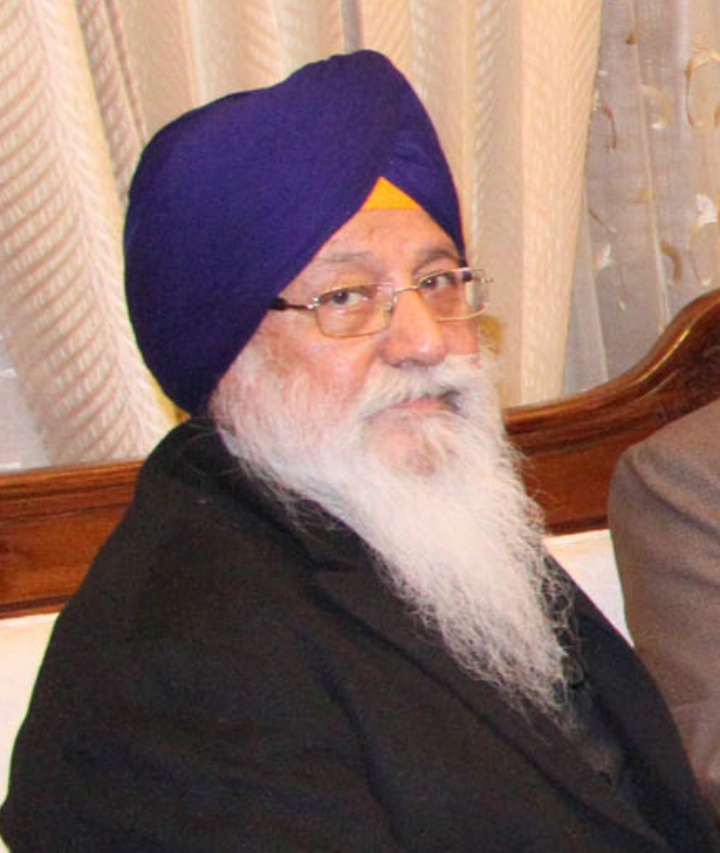

President of Shiromani Gurdwara Parbandhak Committee
- In office 23 November 2005 – 4 November 2016
- Preceded by: Jagir Kaur
- Succeeded by: Kirpal Singh Badungar

Personal details
- Born: 3 January 1943 Sargodha, Punjab, British India (now in Punjab, Pakistan)
- Died: 21 December 2019 Gurugram, Haryana
- Party: Shiromani Akali Dal
- Parent(s): S. Harbans Singh and Smt. Kishan Kaur

Avtar Singh Makkar (1943–2019) was a Punjabi politician and former President of Shiromani Gurdwara Parbandhak Committee.

== Life and career ==
After the Partition of India, Avtar Singh Makkar and his family first settled at Mustafabad and then in Roorkee, and finally in Jagraon, Ludhiana District. He did Faculty of Science from Gujranwala Guru Nanak Khalsa College and then served in Life Insurance Corporation of India.

Later, Avtar Singh Makkar served in Shiromani Gurdwara Parbandhak Committee and in 2005 become President of SGPC, till 2016. From 2011 to 2016, he served due to the order of Supreme Court of India.

== Death ==
On 21 December 2019 Avtar Singh Makkar died at a private hospital in Gurugram, following a brief illness.
