= 1926 Punjab Legislative Council election =

1926 Punjab Provincial Legislative Council election
- 1926

71 seats in the Punjab Legislative Council
- Turnout: 54.36% (▲1.54%)
	First party	Second party
Party	Unionist	Hindu Election Board
Seats won	31	12
Seat change	▼2	▲12
	Third party	Fourth party
Party	CSL	Independent
Seats won	11	12
Seat change	▲11	▼5

Legislative Council elections were held in Punjab Province in British India in late 1926. They were the third legislative council elections held in the province under the Government of India Act 1919. The newly elected Council was constituted on 3 January 1927 when its first meeting was held.

Shahab-ud-Din Virk was re-elected as President on 4 January 1927. The Council was given the extension of about 7 months in its three years town and was dissolved on 26 July 1930. The Council held 111 meetings during its extended tenure.

== Distribution of seats ==
Category	Urban	Rural	Total
General	7	13	20
Mohammadans	5	27	32
Sikh	1	11	12
Special^	-	-	7
Total	13	51	71

Special^ (Non-Territorial)

- Punjab Landholders - 3
  - General - 1
  - Mohammadan - 1
  - Sikh - 1
- Baluch Tumandars - 1
- Punjab Universities - 1
- Punjab Commerce and Trade - 1
- Punjab Industry - 1

== Election schedule ==
Event	Date
Filing of Nominations	5 November 1926
Scrutiny of Nominations	8 November 1926
Polling	23 and 30 November 1926
Counting	? December 1926

- Election schedule in special constituencies were not same and the dates were different, unfortunately not available.

== Category wise result ==
S. No.	Party	Category (Seats)							
S. No.	Party	General Urban (7)	General Rural (13)	Muhammadans Urban (5)	Muhammadans Rural (27)	Sikh Urban (1)	Sikh Rural (11)	Special (7)	Total (71)
1	Unionist Party	-	5	-	23	-	-	3	31
2	Hindu Election Board	4	7	-	-	-	-	1	12
3	Central Sikh League	-	-	-	-	1	10	-	11
4	Khilafatists	-	-	2	1	-	-	-	3
5	Indian National Congress	1	1	-	-	-	-	-	2
6	Independent	2	-	3	3	-	1	3	12

Special (7)

- Landholders (3)
  - General (1)
    - Hindu Election Board - 1
  - Mohammadans (1)
    - Unionist Party - 1
  - Sikh (1)
    - Unionist Party - 1
- Baluch Tumandars (1)
  - Unionist Party - 1
- Punjab Universities (1)
  - Independent - 1
- Punjab Commerce and Trade (1)
  - Independent -1
- Punjab Industries(1)
  - Independent - 1

== Result ==
Party	Seats	+/–
Unionist Party	31	–2
Hindu Election Board	12	New
Central Sikh League	11	New
Khilafatists	3	New
Indian National Congress	2	New
Independents	12	–5
Total	71	0
Source: Ali

== Constituency wise result ==
Color Keys for the Party of winner

- Unionist Party
- Hindu Election Board
- Central Sikh League
- Khilafatists
- Indian National Congress
- Independent

Other keys

- Candidate Elected Unopposed

General-Urban

S. No.	Constituency	Winner	Party
1	Lahore City	Bakshi Tek Chand	Hindu Election Board
2	Amritsar City	Kesho Ram	Independent
3	South-Eastern Towns	Joti Prasad	Hindu Election Board
4	North-Eastern Towns	Mohan Lal	Hindu Election Board
5	East-Western Towns	Daulat Ram Kalia	Independent
6	North-Western Towns	Gokul Chand	Hindu Election Board
7	Western Punjab	Bodh Raj	Indian National Congress

General-Rural

S. No.	Constituency	Winner	Party
8	Hissar	Chhaju Ram	Unionist Party
9	South-Eastern Rohtak	Chottu Ram	Unionist Party
10	North-Eastern Rohtak	Baldeo Singh	Hindu Election Board
11	Gurgaon	Balbir Singh	Hindu Election Board
12	Karnal	Duli Chand	Unionist Party
13	Ambala-Simla	Ganga Ram	Hindu Election Board
14	Kangra	Ram Singh	Unionist Party
15	Hoshiarpur	Nanak Chand	Hindu Election Board
16	Jullundur-Ludhiana	Hans Raj	Indian National Congress
17	Lahore-Ferozpur-Sheikhupura	Gopal Das	Hindu Election Board
18	Amritsar-Gurdaspur	Kesar Singh	Unionist Party
19	Rawalpindi	Labh Singh	Hindu Election Board
20	Multan	Sewak Ram	Hindu Election Board

Muhammadan-Urban

S. No.	Constituency	Winner	Party
21	Lahore City	Mohammed Iqbal	Independent
22	Amritsar City	Mohammed Sadiq	Independent
23	Western Punjab Towns	Mohammed Alam	Khilafatists
24	East West Central Towns	Din Mohammed	Independent
25	South-Eastern Towns	Feroz-ud-Din	Khilafatists

Muhammadan-Rural

S. No.	Constituency	Winner	Party
26	Gurgaon Hissar	Yasin Khan	Unionist Party
27	Ambala	Rahim Baksh	Independent
28	Hoshiarpur Ludhiana	Afzal Haq	Khilafatists
29	Ferozpur	Akbar Ali	Independent
30	Jullundur	Abdur Rehman Khan	Unionist Party
31	Kangra Gurdaspur	Shahab-ud-din Virk	Unionist Party
32	Lahore	Habibullah	Unionist Party
33	Amritsar	Maqbool Mahmud	Unionist Party
34	Sialkot	Zafrullah Khan	Independent
35	Gujranwala	Ali Ahmed	Unionist Party
36	Sheikhupura	Mohammed Khan Wagha	Unionist Party
37	Gujarat East	Fazl Ali	Unionist Party
38	Gujarat West	Umar Hayat	Unionist Party
39	Shahpur East	Firoz Khan Noon	Unionist Party
40	Shahpur West	Nawab Mohammed Hayat Qureshi	Unionist Party
41	Mianwali	Saifullah Khan	Unionist Party
42	Attock	Mohammed Amin Khan	Unionist Party
43	Rawalpindi	Nur Khan	Unionist Party
44	Jehlum	Talib Mohammed Khan	Unionist Party
45	Lyallpur North	Shahadat Khan	Unionist Party
46	Lyallpur South	Sadaullah Khan	Unionist Party
47	Montgomery	Husaini Shah	Unionist Party
48	Multan East	Ahmad Yar Khan	Unionist Party
49	Multan West	Raza Shah Gilani	Unionist Party
50	Jhang	Mubarak Ali Shah	Unionist Party
51	Muzaffargarh	Abdullah Khan	Unionist Party
52	Dera Gazi Khan	Faiz Mohammed	Unionist Party

Sikh-Urban

S. No.	Constituency	Winner	Party
53	Sikh Urban	Ujjal Singh	Central Sikh League

Sikh-Rural

S. No.	Constituency	Winner	Party
54	Ambala Division	Hari Singh	Central Sikh League
55	Hoshiarpur Kangara	Kundan Singh	Central Sikh League
56	Jullundur	Partap Singh Shankar	Central Sikh League
57	Ludhiana	Mohinder Singh	Central Sikh League
58	Ferozpur	Fateh Singh	Independent
59	Lahore	Hira Singh	Central Sikh League
60	Amritsar	Santa Singh	Central Sikh League
61	Sialkot Gurdaspur	Bishan Singh	Central Sikh League
62	Lyallpur	Kartar Singh Bedi	Central Sikh League
63	Multan Shekhupura	Buta Singh	Central Sikh League
64	Rawalpindi Gujranwala	Narain Singh	Central Sikh League

Special

S. No.	Constituency	Winner	Party
Landholders
65	Punjab (General)	Raja Narendra Nath	Hindu Election Board
66	Punjab (Muhammadan)	Sikandar Hayat Khan	Unionist Party
67	Punjab (Sikh)	Joginder Singh	Unionist Party
Tumandars
68	Baluch Tumandars	Jamal Khan Leghari	Unionist Party
University
69	Punjab; Universities	Manohar Lal	Independent
Commerce and Trade
70	Punjab Commerce and Trade	V. F. Gray	Independent
Industry
71	Punjab; Industries	Dhanpat Rai	Independent

== Office bearer ==
Post	Name	Tenure		Party
President	Shahab-ud-Din Virk	3 January 1927	26 July 1930	Unionist Party
Deputy President	Buta Singh	5 January 1927	21 July 1927	Central Sikh League
Deputy President	Habibullah	21 July 1927	26 July 1930	Unionist Party

Ex-Officio member and Ministers

Name	Member of Department	Party
Geoffrey Fitzhervey de Montmorency	Finance	Non-Partisan
Henry Duffield Craik	Finance	Non-Partisan

Ministers

Name	Member of Department	Party
Feroz Khan Noon	Local Self Government	Unionist Party
Fazl-i-Hussain	Revenue	Unionist Party
Jogendra Singh	Agriculture	Unionist Party
Manohar Lal	Education	Independent

== See also ==
- Punjab Legislative Council (British India)
