= Harjinder Singh Dhami =

Indian Sikh lawyer (born 1956)

Advocate Harjinder Singh Dhami
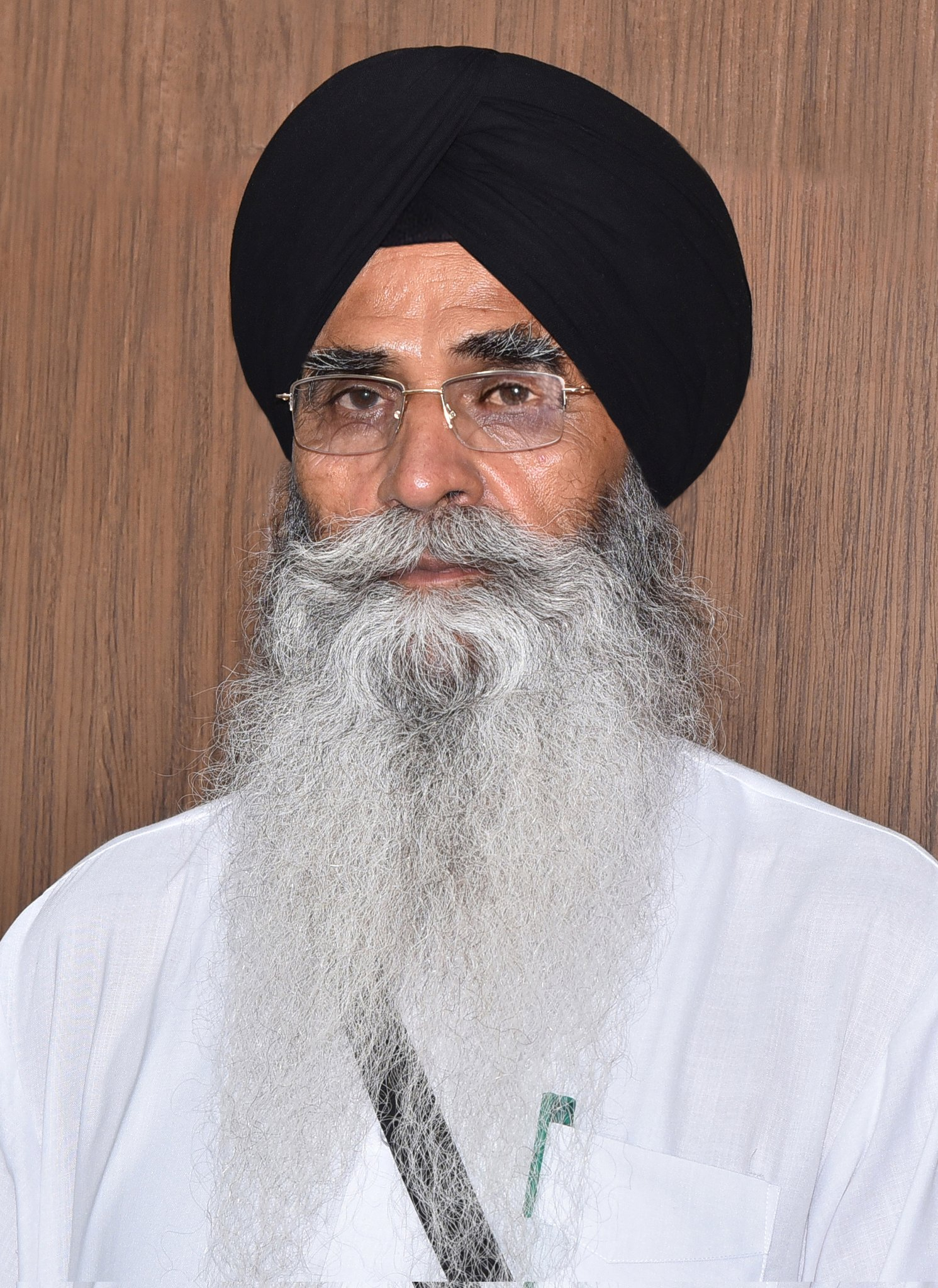

31st President of Shiromani Gurdwara Parbandhak Committee
- Incumbent
- Assumed office 29 November 2021
- Vice President: Baldev Singh Kaimpur; Avtar Singh Ria
- Preceded by: Jagir Kaur

Member of Shiromani Gurdwara Parbandhak Committee
- Incumbent
- Assumed office 1996
- Constituency: Sham Churasi, Hoshiarpur, Punjab, India

Personal details
- Born: 28 August 1956 (age 69) Piplan Wala, Punjab, India
- Party: Shiromani Akali Dal

Harjinder Singh Dhami (born 28 August 1956) is a Sikh lawyer who has been serving as the 30th president of Shiromani Gurdwara Parbandhak Committee since 2021. He has been a member of Shiromani Gurdwara Parbandhak Committee for Sham Churasi in Hoshiarpur since 1996.

On February 17, 2025, he announced his resignation as the President of the Shiromani Gurdwara Parbandhak Committee. However, Dhami's resignation was rejected by the SGPC's executive board. Despite facing a challenger from a breakaway faction of the Shiromani Akali Dal in the 2025 SGPC elections, Dhami handily secured victory in his fifth consecutive election to the presidency by earning 117 of the 136 total votes cast.
