= Adam Chetwynd, 10th Viscount Chetwynd =

British businessman and peer

Adam Richard John Casson Chetwynd, 10th Viscount Chetwynd of Bearhaven (2 February 1935 – 20 August 2015) was a British businessman and peer.

He was Viscount Chetwynd from 1965 until his death.

== Life ==
The son of Adam Duncan Chetwynd, 9th Viscount Chetwynd of Bearhaven, and his wife Joan Gilbert Casson, daughter of Herbert Alexander Casson CSI, of Arthog, Merionethshire, he was educated at Eton College and then on 4 December 1954 was commissioned into the Queen's Own Cameron Highlanders, serving until 1956.

On 12 June 1965, Chetwynd succeeded as Viscount Chetwynd, of Bearhaven (1717), and as Baron Rathdowne (1717).

Between 1968 and 1978, Chetwynd lived in Salisbury, Rhodesia, and from 1972 to 1975 in Johannesburg, South Africa. In 1982 he was appointed a Fellow of the Institute of Life and Pension Advisers and in 1986 was an executive consultant with Liberty Life Association of Africa. In 1996 he became a liveryman of the Guild of Air Pilots and Air Navigators.

On 19 February 1966, Chetwynd married firstly Celia Grace Ramsay, daughter of Commander Alexander Robert Ramsay; they were divorced in 1974, after having three children:

- Emma Grace Chetwynd (born 1967)
- Adam Douglas Chetwynd, later 11th Viscount Chetwynd of Bearhaven (born 1969)
- Robert Duncan Chetwynd (born 1969)

On 15 August 1975, he married secondly Angela May McCarthy, daughter of Jack Payne McCarthy.

In 2003, Chetwynd was living in Bryanston, South Africa. In Who's Who, his recreations were stated as astronomy and travel.

Chetwynd died on 20 August 2015 in South Africa. His remains were brought back to Britain and buried at Arthog, Merionethshire, Wales.

== Notes ==
Peerage of Ireland
| Preceded by Adam Chetwynd | Viscount Chetwynd; 1965–2015 | Succeeded by Adam Chetwynd |
