= Kirpal Singh Badungar =

Politician

President of Shiromani Gurdwara Parbandhak Committee
- In office 27 November 2001 – 27 July 2003
- Preceded by: Jagdev Singh Talwandi
- Succeeded by: Gurcharan Singh Tohra
- In office 5 November 2016 – 28 November 2017
- Preceded by: Avtar Singh Makkar
- Succeeded by: Gobind Singh Longowal

Personal details
- Born: 14 January 1942 (age 83); Badungar Village, Patiala State (now in Patiala District, Punjab)
- Political party: Shiromani Akali Dal

Kirpal Singh Badungar is a politician from Punjab, India. He is the former president of Shiromani Gurdwara Parbandhak Committee.

== Career ==
Kirpal Singh Badungar is from the Badungar village of Patiala. He did Gyani from Punjabi University, Patiala and then post graduation in English Literature. He taught in a school for few years before joining Shiromani Akali Dal, and served as the secretary of Shiromani Akali Dal for five years between 1996 and 2001. He worked as the president of the Shiromani Gurdwara Parbandhak Committee from 2001 to 2003 and then from 2016 to 2017.
