= Giani Sher Singh =

Giani Sher Singh, born in January 1980 in Thikriwala, in Punjab, India was a political leader and newspaper editor. As a result of his extensive knowledge for Sikhism, he came to be known as Giani.

== Early life ==
Giani Sher Singh was born in January 1980 in the village of Thikriwala in the Sangrur district of the Punjab (now Barnala) to Waryam Singh and Nand Kaur. He lost his eyesight due to smallpox in his childhood, but continued his studies. He got his primarily education by Sant Jwala Das and Sant Bhola Singh and then studied at an institution for blind children at Daudhar for about five years.
