= Gopal Singh Qaumi =

Social & Political activist in India

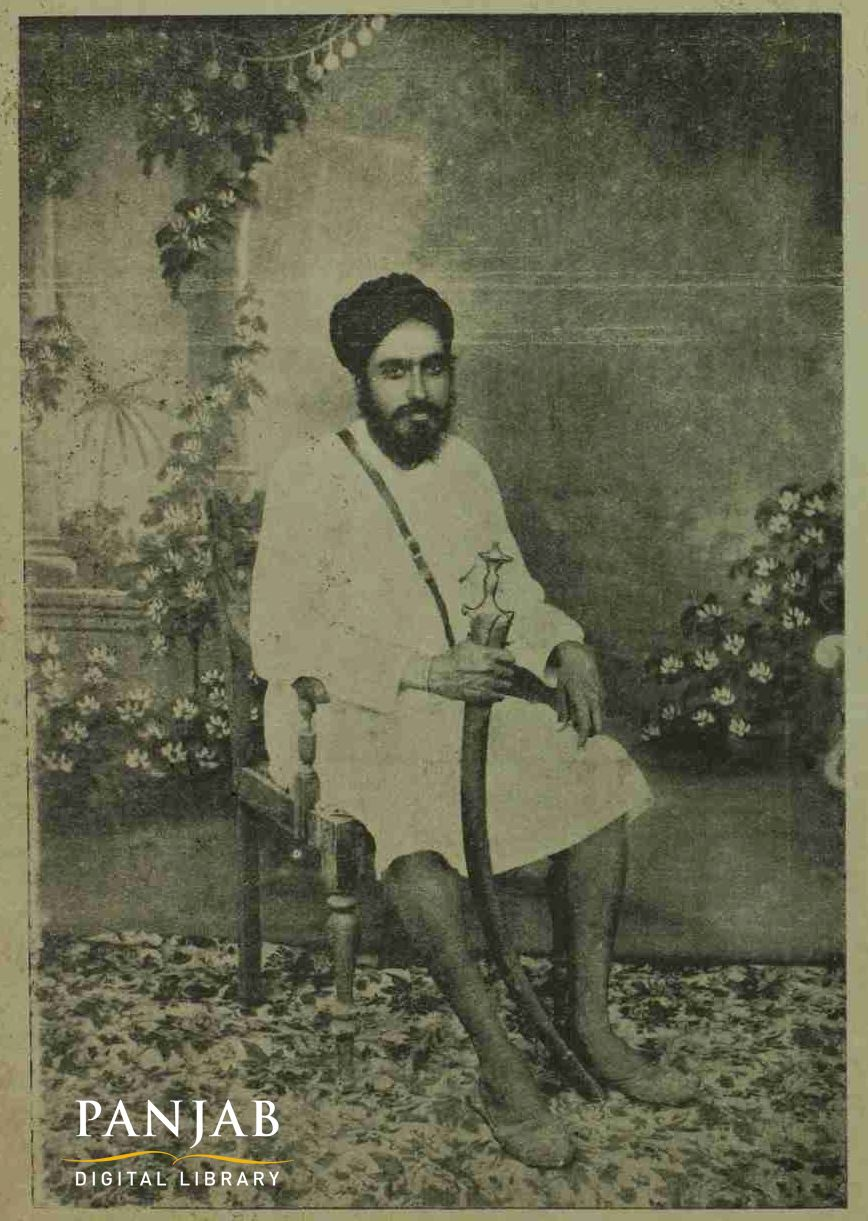
- In office 17 June 1933 – 18 June 1933

President of Shiromani Gurdwara Prabandhak Committee
- Preceded by: Tara Singh
- Succeeded by: Partap Singh Shankar

President of Shiromani Akali Dal
- Preceded by: Tara Singh
- Succeeded by: Tara Singh Thetar

Personal details
- Born: 1897
- Died: 1975 (aged 77–78)

Gopal Singh Qaumi (1897–1975) was an active member of the Gurdwara Reform Movement. He served as the President of the Shiromani Gurdwara Prabandhak Committee just for one day, until now the shortest serving president. He remained in confinement for 13 years during the freedom struggle. He took an active part in the Simon Commission boycott, the Quit India movement, Guru Ka Bagh Morcha and went for 64 days hunger strike in jail. He was awarded the Tamra Patra award by the Government of India on 15 August 1975. He also remained the President of Shiromani Akali Dal.
