= Mehtab Singh (politician) =

British Indian lawyer, freedom fighter and legislator (1879-1938)

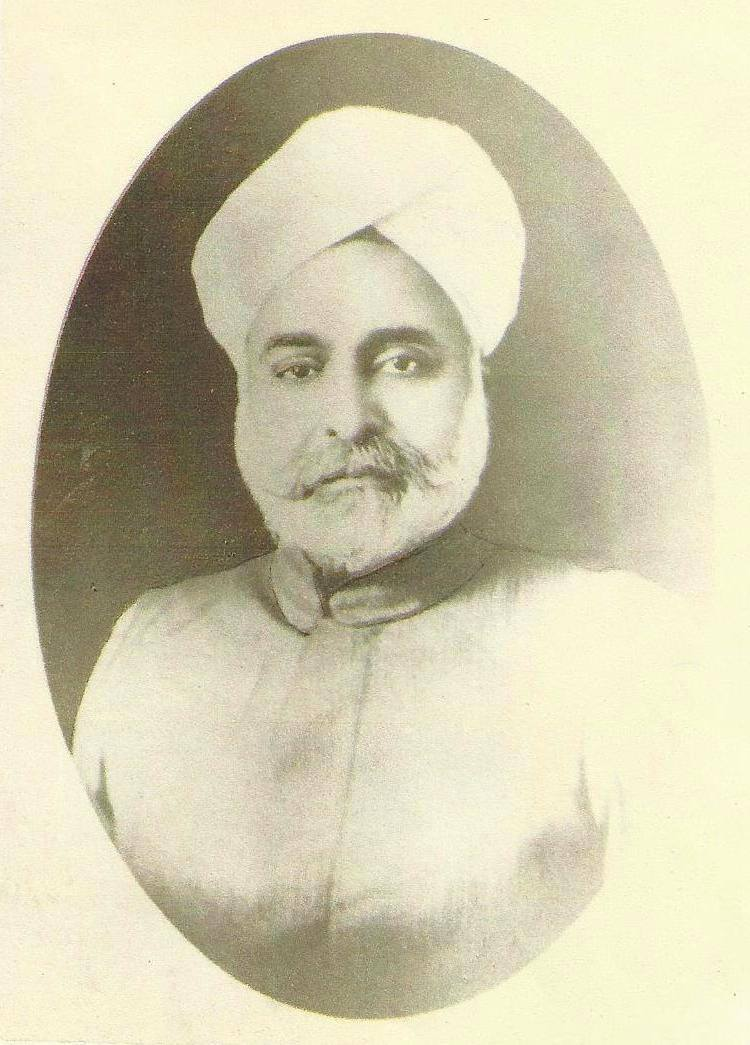

President of Shiromani Gurdwara Parbandhak Committee
- In office 16 July 1922 - 27 April 1925
- Preceded by: Sundar Singh Ramgarhya
- Succeeded by: Mangal Singh

Deputy President of Punjab Legislative Council
- In office 23 February 1921 - 24 October 1921
- Preceded by: Post Established
- Succeeded by: Manohar Lal

Personal details
- Born: 1879 Hadali, Punjab, British Raj
- Died: 23 May 1938 (aged 58–59)
- Party: Shiromani Akali Dal
- Relations: Hazur Singh (father); Karam Kaur (mother); Sardar Bahadur Sujan Singh (uncle); Governor Ujjal Singh (cousin); Sardar Bahadur Sir Sobha Singh (cousin)

Mehtab Singh (1879–1938) was a lawyer, freedom fighter and legislator who became closely associated with Gurudwara Reform movement and later became the president of the Shiromani Gurdwara Prabandhak Committee.

== Early life and education ==
Mehtab Singh born on 1879 in Hadali, Shahpur District now in Pakistan. His father Hazur Singh died when Mehtab Singh was four years old. He had his early education at village school and passed the Entrance examination for Central Model School, Lahore, in 1895. He was related to Sardar Sujan Singh, Sardar Ujjal Singh and Sir Sobha Singh as they were cousins, he was the one who introduced Ujjal Singh to Sikh politics, who later became the Governor of Punjab and Tamil Nadu.

Then he proceeded to England where he studied law. He returned to British India in 1898 as Barrister at Law. He was appointed government pleader at Ferozpur and then transferred to Lahore. He was honoured by the Government with the titles of Sardar Sahib in 1915 and Sardar Bahadur in 1918.

== Freedom Struggle ==
In 1921 he became the member of Punjab Legislative Council and then became its vice president but he resigned from both vice presidency and membership of the council on 11 November 1921, as a protest against British Government for taking away the keys of Harimandir Sahib treasury and he plunged into the Gurdwara Reform Movement.

On 26 November 1921, was arrested at Ajnala in an Akali Diwan on the charge of making a seditious speech and sentenced to 6 months imprisonment, with a fine of Rs. 1000. In the absence of Baba Kharak Singh in jail, Mehtab Singh acted as President of Shiromani Gurdwara Prabandhak Committee. He was again arrested in the Gurdwara Guru ka Bagh agitation in 1922. In October 1923 when SGPC and SAD were declared unlawful organisations, he again with other leaders detained. He was one of the Seven delegates of All Parties Conference at Delhi on 24 February 1928.

At All Parties Convention at Calcutta on 28 and 29 December 1928, he strongly opposed the views of Mohammed Ali Jinnah. He was the president of the committee for the notified Sikh Gurdwaras at Nankana Sahib from 1933 to 1936.

Mehtab Singh died of Heart attack on 23 May 1938.
