= Thikriwala (Barnala) =

- Village
- Location in Punjab, India Thikriwala (India)
- Coordinates: 30.4328°N 75.5261°E
- Country: India
- State: Punjab
- District: Barnala

Population (2011)
  - Total: 10,080

Languages
  - Official: Punjabi
- Time zone: UTC+5:30 (IST)
- PIN: 148101

Thikriwala is a village in Barnala district in Indian state of Punjab. It is located 5 km away from Barnala. It is among the second largest and oldest villages in Punjab. In Punjabi language thikri means shard, so this village gets its name because people of numerous gotras and castes live here. Thikriwala is birthplace of freedom fighter Sardar Sewa Singh Thikriwala, the ancestor of Jagmeet Singh leader of New Democratic Party Canada. Every year on 18, 19 and 20 January a barsi (death anniversary function) is organized in village to commemorate Sardar Sewa Singh.

== Education ==
There is one Government Primary School and two Government Senior Secondary School in Thikriwala. Few other private institutions are also serving the society.

== Demographics ==
As of 2011 India census, Thikriwala had a population of 10080. Males constitute 54% of population and female 46%. In Thikriwala, 11% of the population was under 6 years of age. Overall literacy rate is 63%.

== Notable people from Thikriwala ==
- The ancestors of Jagmeet Singh leader of New Democratic Party Canada.
