= Gurcharan Singh Tohra =

President of Shiromani Gurdwara Parbandhak Committee for 27 years (1924-2004)

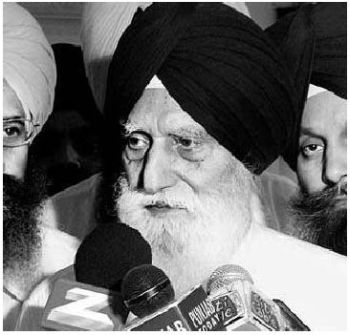

President of Shiromani Gurdwara Prabandhak Committee
- In office 6 June 1973 - 23 March 1986
- Preceded by: Mohan Singh Tur
- Succeeded by: Kabal Singh
- In office 30 November 1986 - 20 November 1990
- Preceded by: Kabal Singh
- Succeeded by: Baldev Singh Sibiya
- In office 13 November 1991 - 16 March 1999
- Preceded by: Baldev Singh Sibiya
- Succeeded by: Jagir Kaur
- In office 27 July 2003 - 31 March 2004
- Preceded by: Kirpal Singh Badungar
- Succeeded by: Alwinderpal Singh Pakhoke

Personal details
- Born: Gurcharan Singh Tohra; 24 September 1924 Tohra, Patiala State, British India
- Died: 1 April 2004 (aged 79) New Delhi, India
- Party: Shiromani Gurdwara Parbandhak Committee (SGPC) Shiromani Akali Dal
- Spouse: Mrs Joginder Kaur

Panth Rattan Shiri Gurcharan Singh Tohra (24 September 1924 – 1 April 2004) was a president of Shiromani Gurdwara Parbandhak Committee (SGPC), a Sikh body in charge of controlling Gurdwara (Sikh places of worship). He died of a heart attack in New Delhi on 1 April 2004 at the age of 79. He remained the head of the SGPC for a record 24 years, and was one of the most influential and controversial Sikh leaders of the 20th century.

He was born in the village of Tohra in Patiala District, to Sikh family of Tiwana Jatts.

Indian President A. P. J. Abdul Kalam described the Sikh leader as a "prominent political and social leader who was well known for his work during his many years in public life".

== Sobriquets ==
During his lifetime and after his death, Gurcharan Singh Tohra was addressed by many sobriquets. It included Pope of the Sikhs, Pearl of the Panth, Kingmaker, Pope, Messiah, Reformist, Conformist, Forever-Dissenter, Wily Fox, Wily Politician, and Machiavelli. Followers often addressed him as Pardhanji (President) or Jathedar.

== Punjab politics ==
He was born in September 1924 in the Punjabi village of Tohra. Even before India's partition, he was an active member of the Akali movement. He became General Secretary of the Patiala unit of the Shiromani Akali Dal in 1947.

Tohra, a graduate in Punjabi from Lahore University, worked at the grassroots level for the next two decades and came into contact with Communists, including CPI-M leader Harkishan Singh Surjeet though he did not become one himself.

Known as a hardliner, Tohra had carved out for himself the image of a non-conformist with the powers-that-be in Akali politics and had taken frontline SAD leaders Surjit Singh Barnala and Parkash Singh Badal who had headed Akali Dal governments in Punjab in the eighties and nineties. He was known for his own brand of politics.

Tohra was a member of Lok Sabha in 1977–79 though earlier he was elected as a member of the Rajya Sabha five times from Punjab from 1969 to 1976 and re-elected in May 1980, April 1982, April 1998, and March 2004.

He played a huge role in Sikh political affairs in post partition India. Along with Parkash Singh Badal and Jagdev Singh Talwandi, he was regarded as the triumvirate of Sikh politics in Punjab. Unlike the other two, his main domain was the Sikh religious institution, the SGPC. Though he dabbled with electoral politics often, Tohra made his mark in Sikh religious affairs. He is credited with rebuilding the institution of the Akal Takhat.

== Rajya Sabha Election History ==
Position	Party	Constituency	From	To	Tenure
Member of Parliament, Rajya Sabha (1st Term)	SAD	Punjab	28 March 1969	2 April 1970	1 year, 5 days
Member of Parliament, Rajya Sabha (2nd Term)	SAD	Punjab	3 April 1970	2 April 1976	5 years, 365 days
Member of Parliament, Rajya Sabha (3rd Term)	SAD	Punjab	9 May 1980	2 April 1982	1 year, 328 days
Member of Parliament, Rajya Sabha (4th Term)	SAD	Punjab	3 April 1982	2 April 1988	5 years, 365 days
Member of Parliament, Rajya Sabha (5th Term)	SAD	Punjab	10 April 1998	1 April 2004	5 years, 357 days

== Early days ==
As an agriculturalist, Tohra was first jailed in 1945 during the Riyasti Praja Mandal Movement in Nabha, in 1950 for formation of popular government in PEPSU. In 1955 and 1960 Tohra was put behind bars in connection with Punjabi Suba agitations, in 1973 in connection with Kisan agitation in Haryana, in 1975, under MISA and under NSA and TADA and religious matters, including Dharam Yudh Morcha and Operation Blue Star (1984).

Tohra became the acting president of SGPC, which manages key Sikh shrines, in 1972 after the death of Sant Chanan Singh and was formally elected its president for the first time in November that year.

Tohra continued to head the SGPC, considered the mini-parliament of the Sikh community, for a record 27 years before he was unceremoniously removed from the key post following a split in SAD in the wake of his revolt against Badal's leadership.

Tohra was arrested during the Emergency and was very popular in Punjab until Jarnail Singh Bhindranwala emerged on the scene and militancy took over Sikh politics.

== Operation Bluestar ==
During Operation Blue Star in 1984 to clear up Harmandir Sahib (Golden Temple) complex from sikh militants, Tohra was the President of the Shiromani Gurdwara Parbandhak Committee. The army operation happened between 1–6 June 1984. Several Akali Dal leaders were stuck in the temple complex during the operation. Gurcharan Singh Tohra was among the Sikh leaders who gave up and were rescued by Army from within the Golden Temple. They could only be evacuated in an Armoured personnel carrier (APC) due to fear of firing from the Singhs fighting for their Temple. When the Army officers met him, the first question he wanted to know was if Jarnail Singh Bhindranwale was dead or alive.

== Troubled times ==
Tohra's differences with then chief minister Parkash Singh Badal contributed to the fall of the Akali-Janata coalition in 1980. That began a period of crisis for Tohra as he seemed to favour Bhindranwala's ideas which did not sit well with the opposition.

After Operation Blue Star in 1984, Tohra became an embittered man and did not endorse the Punjab accord put forward by the Rajiv Gandhi government to the Akalis for sharing political power with Harchand Singh Longowal. He took another controversial step some time later by having Sikhs demolish the Akal Takht which was rebuilt after Operation Blue Star by pro-government religious leaders. The Takht was rebuilt by the Sikhs over several years. This turned him into the 'bete noire' not only of the Centre but also of the then Akali government in Punjab headed by Surjit Singh Barnala which had opposed the move.

He was detained under the National Security Act but continued to be elected SGPC chairman for several years in absentia. Throughout this bleak period, Tohra was supported by Badal but in 1999, the two leaders, considered the best of friends, fell out after the SGPC chief pressed for Badal's removal as SAD chief.

== Tohra-Badal feud ==
The feud of Gurcharan Singh Tohra vs Parkash Singh Badal was described as "Clash of Titans". The origin of Tohra-Badal feud could be traced to the former's casual remarks, made in November 1998, suggesting one-man-one-post for Akali Dal leaders. According to historian Dr Harjinder Singh Dilgeer, the personal opponents of Tohra availed this opportunity and provoked Badal to expel the latter from the SGPC and the Akali Dal. At this, Badal had Tohra removed as SGPC chief on 16 March 1999, a few days before the commencement of tercentenary celebrations of the birth of the Khalsa at Anandpur Sahib.

Tohra was then expelled from SAD forcing him to form a new party Sarv Hind Shiromani Akali Dal with five members of Badal's cabinet, including Manjit Singh Calcutta, Mahesh Inder Singh Grewal, Harmail Singh, Inderjit Singh Zira and Surjit Singh Kohli, Jathedar Sukhdev Singh Bhaur Acting President of SGPC who all resigned in protest against the expulsion.

Badal consolidated his grip on Akal Takht, the highest temporal seat of Sikhism, by removing Bhai Ranjit Singh as its top Jathedar in February 1999 and installing his hand-picked Giani Puran Singh. Tohra was also replaced by Bibi Jagir Kaur the first woman president of the SGPC.

Adversity brought Tohra and Badal together again after SAD was routed in the February 2002 assembly elections in Punjab and Tohra's SSHAD failed to win even a single seat.

Badal was at the receiving end of Amarinder Singh-headed Congress government's anti-corruption campaign as vigilance personnel searched his premises as well as those of his MP son Sukhbir Singh Badal in Punjab and outside.

After this, considering the panthik interests more important the then prominent Sikh leader and scholar Prof. Kirpal Singh Badungar left his seat of SGPC president for Tohra. On 13 June 2003, Badal and Tohra finally buried the hatchet after the latter welcomed the former's appearance before the Akal Takht and expressed satisfaction over the mild religious punishment ordered by the Sikh clergy to the former chief minister. Tohra was appointed SGPC President in July 2003 after he accepted Badal's pre-eminence in the SAD.

== New party ==
After splitting with the Shiromani Akali Dal led by Parkash Singh Badal, Tohra floated his own party called the All India Shiromani Akali Dal (also called the Sarv Hind Shiromani Akali Dal). Five ministers of the ruling government Science and Technology Minister Mahesh Inder Singh Grewal, Higher Education Minister Manjit Singh Calcutta, Public Works Minister Harmel Singh and Ministers Inderjit Singh Zira and Surjit Singh Kohli quit the ruling government and joined Tohra. Veteran leader Surjan Singh Thekedar & Acting President of SGPC Jathedar Sukhdev Singh Bhaur also joined Tohra. However, during the 2002 assembly elections, the party did not fare well. The Congress came to power in 2002 and both Badal and Tohra were in the opposition. Later, in 2003, Badal invited Tohra to rejoin the Shiromani Akali Dal.

== Family ==
Gurcharan Singh Tohra was married to Joginder Kaur who died at the age of 83 on 26 January 2011 Nephew Upkar Singh Tohra

== Tributes ==
Despite being in opposite political campus, the national leadership in India paid tributes to Gurcharan Singh Tohra. Although the Bharatiya Janata Party was upset at Tohra's remarks comparing the then Prime Minister of India, Atal Bihari Vajpayee with the Indira Gandhi, Vajpayee paid his tributes to Tohra on his death. He described Tohra was a leader with deep saintly traits, "A follower of dictum of simple living and high thinking, Shri Tohra made invaluable contribution to the regeneration of social, political and religious life of Punjab. In his death, the country has lost a popular and inspiring figure," the Prime Minister said. Veteran journalist Khushwant Singh stated that Tohra "could have become the uncrowned king of the Sikhs", but "his vision remained limited to launching morchas and going to jail". Though politically ranged against each other, both belong to Patiala then Chief Minister of Punjab, Capt Amarinder Singh stressed the "honest life" of Gurcharan Singh Tohra.
