= 1930 Punjab Legislative Council election =

- 1930

71 seats in the Punjab Legislative Council
	First party	Second party	Third party
Party	Unionist	NPP	Independents
Seats won	37	20	14
Seat change	▲6	New	▲2

Legislative Council elections were held in Punjab Province in British India in 1930. They were the fourth and last legislative council elections held in the province under the Government of India Act 1919. The newly elected Council was constituted on 24 October 1930 when its first meeting was held.

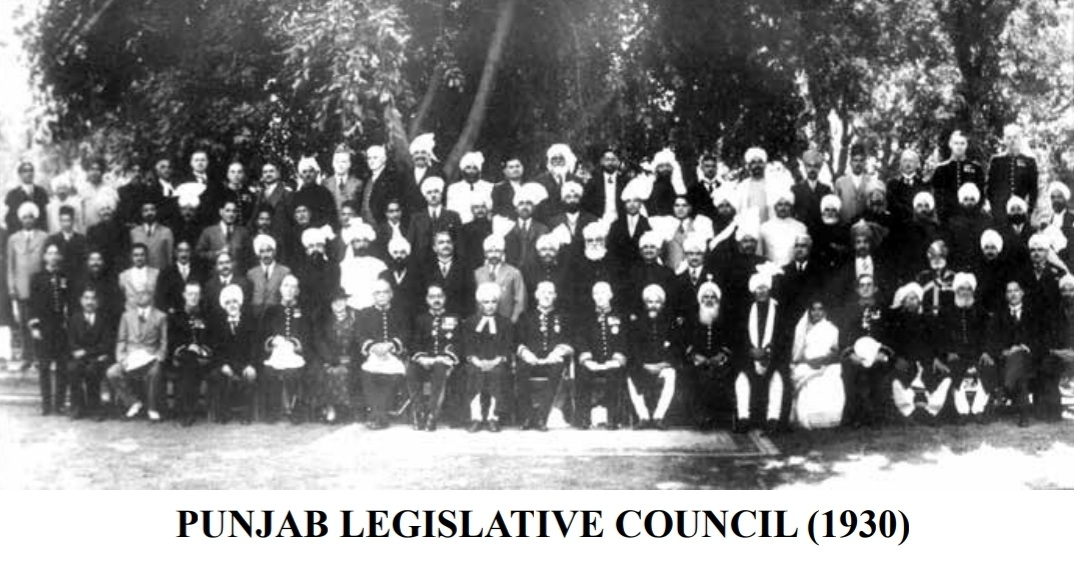
Group photo of Members of Fourth Punjab Legislative Council.

Shahab-ud-Din Virk was re-elected as President on October 25, 1930. The Council was given the extension of about 3 years in its three years term and was dissolved on 10 November 1936. The Council held 197 meetings during its extended tenure.

== Distribution of seats ==
Category	Urban	Rural	Total
General	7	13	20
Mohammadans	5	27	32
Sikh	1	11	12
Special^	-	-	7
Total	13	51	71

Special^ (Non-Territorial)

- Punjab Landholders - 3
  - General - 1
  - Mohammadan - 1
  - Sikh - 1
- Baluch Tumandars - 1
- Punjab Universities - 1
- Punjab Commerce and Trade - 1
- Punjab Industry - 1

== Election schedule ==
Event	Date
Filing of Nominations	1 September 1930
Scrutiny of Nominations	2 September 1930
Polling	12 and 22 September 1930
Counting	? December 1930

- Election schedule in special constituencies were not same and the dates were different, unfortunately not available.

== Results ==
Party	Seats	+/–
Unionist Party	37	+6
National Progressive Party	20	New
Independents	14	+2
Total	71	0
Source: Ali

== Constituency wise result ==
Candidate elected unopposed

General-Urban

S. No.	Constituency	Winner
1	Lahore City	Chaudhary Bansi
2	Amritsar City	Ramji Das
3	South-Eastern Towns	Joti Prasad
4	North-Eastern Towns	Mohan Lal
5	East-Western Towns	Nihal Chand Aggarwal
6	North-Western Towns	Gokul Chand Narang
7	Western Punjab	Chetan Anand

General-Rural

S. No.	Constituency	Winner
8	Hissar	Sajjan Kumar Chaudhary
9	South-Eastern Rohtak	Chottu Ram
10	North-Eastern Rohtak	Ramsarup
11	Gurgaon	Balbir Singh
12	Karnal	Chaudhary Nathwa
13	Ambala-Simla	Manraj Singh
14	Kangra	Pancham Chand
15	Hoshiarpur	Nanak Chand
16	Jullundur-Ludhiana	Bhagat Ram
17	Lahore-Ferozpur-Sheikhupura	Gopal Das
18	Amritsar-Gurdaspur	Kesar Singh
19	Rawalpindi	Labh Singh
20	Multan	Sewak Ram

Muhammadan-Urban

S. No.	Constituency	Winner
21	Lahore City	Mohammed Din Malik
22	Amritsar City	Faqir Hussain Khan
23	Western Punjab Towns	Abdul Ghani
24	East West Central Towns	Din Mohammed
25	South-Eastern Towns	Mohammed Yusuf

Muhammadan-Rural

S. No.	Constituency	Winner
26	Gurgaon Hissar	Yasin Khan
27	Ambala	Allah Daad Khan
28	Hoshiarpur Ludhiana	Iman-ud-din
29	Ferozpur	Pir Akabar Ali
30	Jullundur	Abdur Rehman Khan
31	Kangra Gurdaspur	Shahad-ud-din
32	Lahore	Habibullah
33	Amritsar	Faqir Hussain Khan
34	Sialkot	Mohammed Zafrullah Khan
35	Gujranwala	Riasat Ali
36	Sheikhupura	Shah Mohammed
37	Gujarat East	Fazl Ali
38	Gujarat West	Nazir Husain Ranjha
39	Shahpur East	Firoz Khan Noon
40	Shahpur West	Nawab Mohammed Hayat Qureshi
41	Mianwali	Nawab Malik Muzaffar Khan
42	Attock	Mohammed Amin Khan
43	Rawalpindi	Nir Khan
44	Jehlum	Mohammed Sarfraz Khan
45	Lyallpur North	Rai Jagdev Khan
46	Lyallpur South	Mohammed Nurullah
47	Montgomery	Nur Ahmed Khan
48	Multan East	Mohammed Haibat Khan Daha
49	Multan West	Raza Shah Gilani
50	Jhang	Mubarak Ali Shah
51	Muzaffargarh	Shah Mohammed Hasan
52	Dera Gazi Khan	Faiz Mohammed

Sikh-Urban

S. No.	Constituency	Winner
53	Sikh Urban	Ujjal Singh

Sikh-Rural

S. No.	Constituency	Winner
54	Ambala Division	Ram Singh
55	Hoshiarpur Kangara	Harbaksh Singh
56	Jullundur	Gurbachan Singh
57	Ludhiana	Mohinder Singh
58	Ferozpur	Jaswant Singh
59	Lahore	Jawahar Singh
60	Amritsar	Raghbir Singh
61	Sialkot Gurdaspur	Bishan Singh
62	Lyallpur	Sampuran Singh
63	Multan Shekhupura	Buta Singh
64	Rawalpindi Gujranwala	Narain Singh

Special

S. No.	Constituency	Winner
Landholders
65	Punjab (General)	Raja Narendra Nath
66	Punjab (Muhammadan)	Mohammed Yakham Daultana
67	Punjab (Sikh)	Jogender Singh
Tumandars
68	Baluch; Tumandars	Jamal Khan Leghari
University
69	Punjab; Universities	Manohar Lal
Commerce and Trade
70	Punjab Commerce and Trade	Pandit Mukherji
Industry
71	Punjab; Industries	Mukand Lal Puri
