= Jagir Kaur =

Indian politician

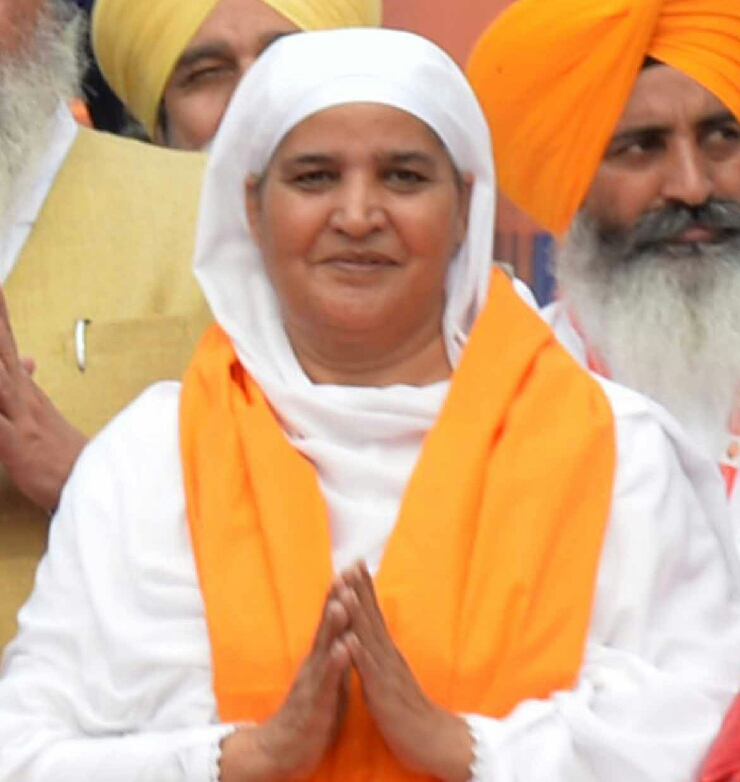

Personal details
- Born: 15 October 1954 (age 72) Bhutnura Lubana, Jalandhar, Punjab, India
- Party: Shiromani Akali Dal (November 2026–present)
- Other political affiliations: Shiromani Akali Dal (Punar Surjit)
- Spouse: Late. S. Charanjit Singh
- Children: 2
- Occupation: Agriculture, social service, politician
- Awards: Bhagirath Award
- Website: http://bibijagirkaur.co.in/

Bibi Jagir Kaur (born 15 October 1954) was the president of the Shiromani Gurdwara Prabandhak Committee (SGPC). She was the first woman to be elected president of the SGPC, and has been elected a total of three times.

Ms. Kaur's name was put forward by the senior Akali leader, Sukhdev Singh Bhaur, and seconded by another SGPC member, Harswinder Singh. There were no other contenders. She had held the same post from March 1999 to November 2000, when she resigned amid allegations that she was involved in the murder of her daughter. She was later acquitted of all charges.

The presidential position became vacant since the death of the Akali stalwart, Gurcharan Singh Tohra, who served for 26 terms. He died in March 2004 after a brief illness.

== Politics ==
Jagir Kaur is an active member of the Shiromani Akali Dal, a Sikh political party with a strong following in Punjab. She joined the party in 1995 and was shortly thereafter appointed member of the party's working committee. In 1997, she was elected from the Bholath constituency in Kapurthala district. She was appointed Tourism and Cultural Affairs Minister in addition to holding the portfolios of social welfare, development of women and children welfare in the Parkash Singh Badal Cabinet. She resigned the post of minister when she was appointed the President of the SGPC. Her rise was meteoric, rising from the position of a teacher in Mathematics to the post of President of the SGPC.

== Death of daughter controversy ==
Jagir Kaur's daughter Harpreet Kaur was found dead under mysterious circumstance on 20 April 2000. The Central Bureau of Investigation investigated the case, widely perceived to be an honor killing ordered by Jagir Kaur in response to her daughter's elopement; Jagir Kaur was eventually sentenced to 5 years rigorous imprisonment for her role in the death of her daughter. In 2017, the Supreme Court rejected a plea by Bibi Jagir Kaur to suspend her conviction so that she can contest the Assembly elections in Punjab. The court on 4 December 2018 acquitted her of all the charges.
