= Shiromani Gurdwara Parbandhak Committee =

Indian Sikh administrative organization

- Abbreviation: SGPC
- Formation: 16 November 1920
- Type: Management organisation
- Headquarters: Teja Singh Samundri Hall, Sri Harmandir Sahib Complex, Sri Amritsar
- Location: Amritsar, Punjab, India
- President: Harjinder Singh Dhami
- Website: http://sgpc.net

The Shiromani Gurdwara Parbandhak Committee (abbr. SGPC; lit. Supreme Gurdwara Management Committee) is an organization in India responsible for the management of gurdwaras, Sikh places of worship, in the states of Punjab and Himachal Pradesh and the union territory of Chandigarh. SGPC also administers Darbar Sahib in Amritsar.

The SGPC is governed by the president of SGPC. The SGPC manages the security, financial, facility maintenance and religious aspects of Gurdwaras as well as keeping archaeologically rare and sacred artifacts, including weapons, clothes, books and writings of the Sikh Gurus. Harjinder Singh Dhami is the current president of SGPC.

== History ==
=== Foundation ===
In 1920 the emerging Akali leadership summoned a general assembly of the Sikhs holding all shades of opinion on 15 November 1920 in vicinity of the Akal Takht in Amritsar. The purpose of this assembly was to elect a representative committee of the Sikhs to administer the Harmandir Sahib Complex and other important historical gurdwaras. Two days before the proposed conference the British government set up its own committee consisting of 36 Sikhs to manage the Harimandir Sahib. Sikhs held their scheduled meeting and elected a bigger committee consisting of 175 members and named it Shiromani Gurdwara Parbandhak Committee. The members of the government appointed committee were also included in it. Harbans Singh Attari became vice president and Sunder Singh Ramgarhia became secretary of the committee. By that time Master Tara Singh had started taking interest in Sikh religious affairs. He was one of the 175 members elected to the committee. The formation of Shiromani Gurdwara Parbandhak Committee provided a focal point for the movement for the reformation of Sikh religious places. The committee began to take over management of gurdwaras one by one, and were resisted by incumbent mahants.

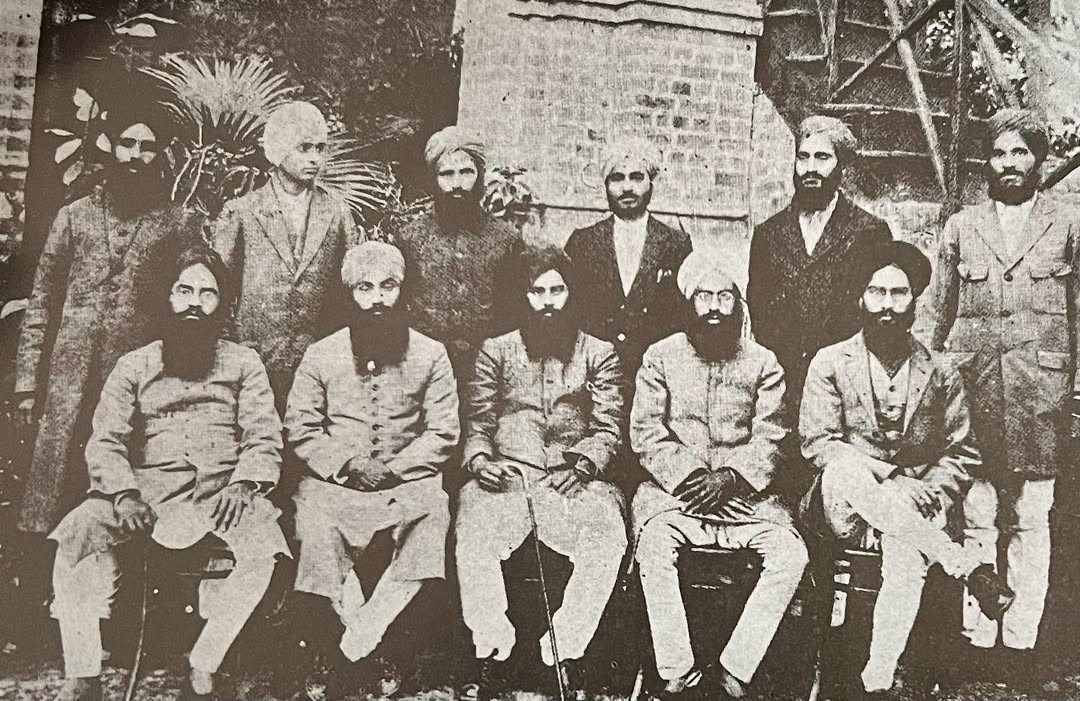
Photograph of members of the Shiromani Gurdwara Parbandhak Committee, ca.1921–27

Starting in late 1920, a large number of reformers both in urban and rural Punjab had joined to form separate and independent religious orders called jathas. The primary purpose of a jatha was to gain control over local gurdwaras. A jatha under the command of a jathedar would occupy a shrine and try to take over management in its favor from its current incumbents. Sometimes the transfer went peacefully especially in the case of smaller Gurdwaras with less income resources. This was done sometimes with the threat of force.

The Sikh leadership was fully aware of the importance of the press for the success of any movement. It enlisted the active support and sympathy of some of the important nationalist papers in the country like 'The Independent', Swaraj (Hindi), The Tribune, Liberal, Kesri (Urdu), Milap (Urdu), Zamindar (Urdu) and Bande Matram (Hindi).Two of the vernacular dailies Akali (Pbi.) and the Akali-te-Pardesi (Urdu), edited by Master Tara Singh also played an important role. It brought the necessary awakening among the Sikh masses and prepared them to undertake the struggle for reform. With the direct and indirect support of the Central Sikh League, the Indian National Congress and the Shiromani Gurdwara Parbandhak Committee, the Shiromani Akali Dal started a non-violent struggle against the government for the control of the Gurdwaras. The reports of some immoral acts perpetrated at Tarn-Taran reached the Shiromani Gurdwara Parbandhak Committee at its meeting on 14 January 1921. A fortnight earlier a local jatha was beaten up and not allowed to perform kirtan at the gurdwara. It decided to send a jatha from Amritsar under Jathedar Teja Singh Bhuchar. Jathedar Kartar Singh Jhabbar with Akalis from 'Khara Sauda Bar' joined him. On 25 January, a group of about forty workers took over the control of Sri Darbar Sahib Tarn-Taran from its Mahant. In the ensuing conflict two Akalis were killed and several others wounded by the henchmen of the Mahants. The Mahants were ousted from the Gurdwara and the Shiromani Gurdwara Parbandhak Committee appointed a managing committee.

=== Gurdwaras Act of 1925 ===
In early 1920s, Malcolm Hailey, the governor of the Punjab showed his readiness to assist the Sikhs in taking possession of all the important Gurdwaras in the province through a five-member committee constituted by the Sikh members of the legislative council. Hailey presented a draft of a new Gurdwara Bill to the Akali leaders imprisoned in Lahore fort. Master Tara Singh, Bhag singh Advocate, Gurcharn singh Advocate, Teja Singh Akerpuri (Jathedar AkalTakht Sahib) Sohan Singh Josh and Sardar Teja Singh Samundri studied each clause of the bill carefully. The bill met all the Akali demands and was signed into law on 28 July 1925 by the Viceroy of India after its ratification by the Punjab legislative council. The Act came into force on 1 November 1925 with a gazette notification from the government of Punjab.

The Act made a Central Gurdwara Board elected by the Sikhs to be the custodian of all important Sikh places of worship. The first meeting of the Gurdwara board passed a resolution that its designation be changed to Shiromani Gurdwara Parbandhak Committee, which was accepted by the government. Thus ended what came to be known in common parlance as the 'Third Sikh War'. The Punjab government withdrew its orders declaring the Shiromani Gurdwara Parbandhak Committee and other Akali organs as unlawful associations and recognized the Shiromani Gurdwara Parbandhak Committee as a representative body of the Sikhs. In making the Punjab government agree to such recognition, the Akali leadership undoubtedly scored a victory over the bureaucracy. The Sikh Gurdwara bill met most of the demands of the Sikhs, but the government was willing to release the prisoners conditionally i.e. on the understanding to be given by the Akalis that they would agree to work for the Gurdwara Act. The Shiromani Akali Dal and the executive declared conditions imposed for the release of prisoners as wholly unnecessary, unjust and derogatory. Among the prominent Akalis, Mehtab Singh and Giani Sher Singh along with twenty other Akali leaders accepted the conditional release. Master Tara Singh, Bhag Singh Advocate, Teja Singh Samundari, Teja singh Akerpuri (Jathedar Akal Takht) and Fifteen other Akalis did not come out as government emphasis on eliciting written assurance and acceptance was to Master Tara Singh, an attack on the self-respect of the Sikhs. He said, "We ourselves have enacted this Act and we are responsible for implementing it, then why this condition?" Teja Singh Samundari died of a heart attack in the jail after some time. The Punjab Government failed to prove the charges against Master Tara Singh and the remaining Akalis, few months later they all were released unconditionally. The courage and sacrifice shown by the Akalis during the trial very soon drove the Mehtab Singh's group out of the political field and led to a rift in the Akali ranks, as the newly released Akalis condemned Mehtab Singh's group as collaborators. Mehtab Singh's group was also known as 'Rai Bahadur Party'. This group had majority in the committee and Mehtab Singh was elected its president. The Akali Party launched a campaign against the conditionally released leaders. When the new elections for the Shiromani Gurdwara Parbandhak Committee were held, the Akali Party won majority and the newly elected Shiromani Gurdwara Parbandhak Committee elected Kharak Singh as the President and Master Tara Singh as the Vice President. Since Baba Kharak Singh had not yet been released the responsibility of the president fell on the shoulders of Master Tara Singh.At the time of 1996 the first time SGPC election is held in Himachal Pradesh and the first person who won from that seat is the candidate of Panthak Akalidal whose name is Satnam Singh Gill.

=== 1953 amendment to Gurdwaras Act of 1925 ===
In 1953, an amendment to the 1925 act allowed the reservation of 20 out 140 seats on the SGPC for the members of the Sikh scheduled castes

=== 2016 amendment to Gurdwaras Act of 1925 ===
The 2016 amendment to the act by the Indian parliament stripped around 7 million 'Sehajdhari' Sikhs of voting in the SGPC elections

== Presidents ==
President of Shiromani Gurdwara Parbandhak Committee
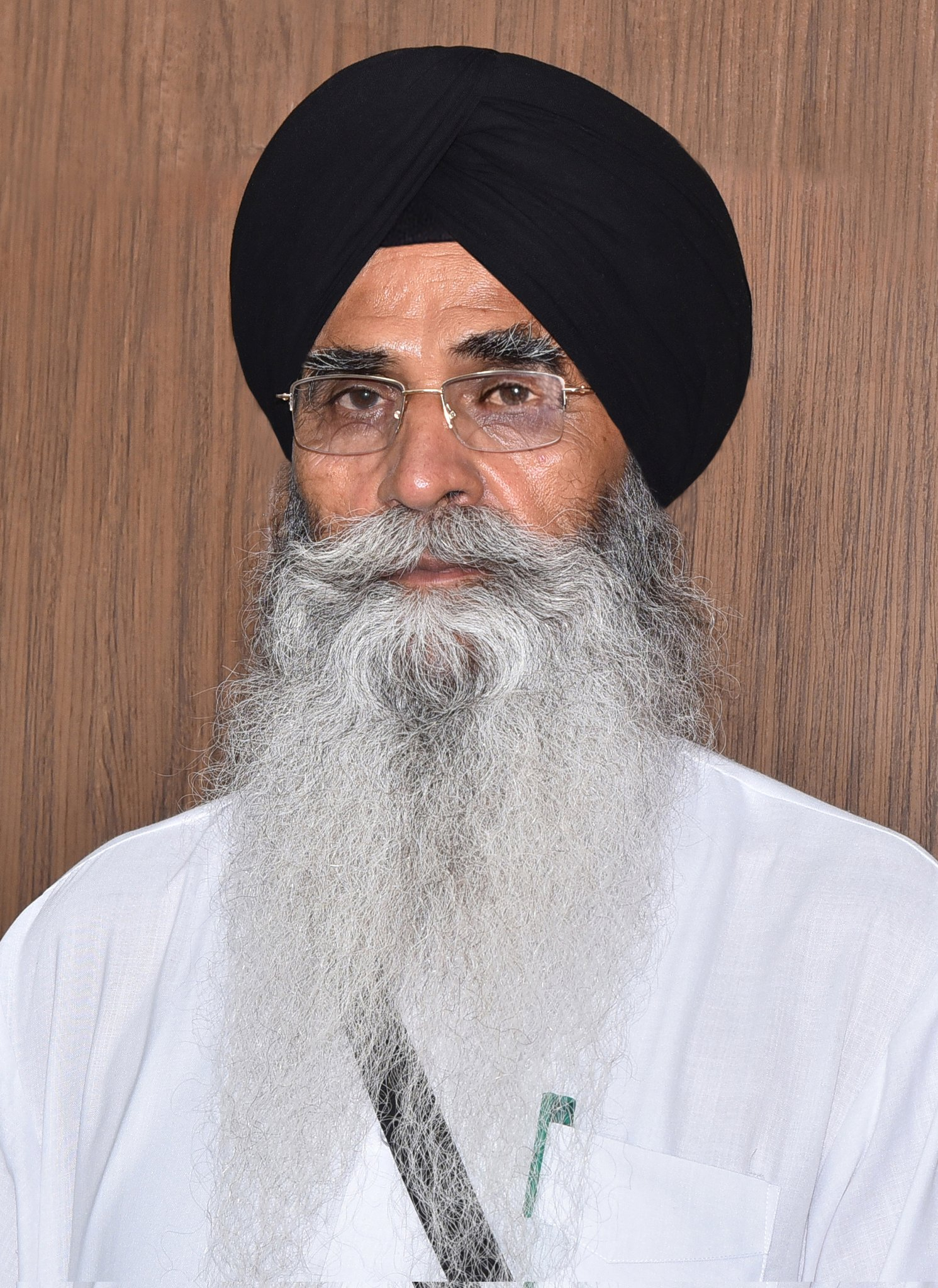
- Incumbent; Harjinder Singh Dhami since 29 November 2021
- Style: Jathedar
- Appointer: Members of Shiromani Gurdwara Parbandhak Committee
- Inaugural holder: Sundar Singh Majithia
- Formation: 12 October 1920; 106 years ago
- Website: Official website

The president of the Shiromani Gurdwara Parbandhak Committee (SGPC) is elected by the Members of SGPC. The president holds powers to organise the meetings of SGPC and deal with matters related to issues of Sikh religion and oversees the management of the Gurdwaras. Since 2008, the president also serves as Chancellor of Sri Guru Granth Sahib World University.

In 1920 SGPC was established when Gurdwara Reform Movement was started. Sundar Singh Majithia was appointed first President of the committee. This post got legal status after the passing of Sikh Gurdwaras Act, 1925 by legislation in British India.

After passing of this act Baba Kharak Singh became the President. The longest-served president of SGPC was Gurcharan Singh Tohra who served for 24 years and shortest-served was Gopal Singh Qaumi who served only for one day in June 1933. The first and the only woman president was Jagir Kaur. Tara Singh served the most, 7 terms.

=== List of presidents ===
Bibi Jagir Kaur became the first woman to be elected president of the SGPC for the second time in September 2004. She had held the same post from March 1999 to November 2000.

S. No.	Name	Portrait	Tenure		
Before Sikh Gurdwara Act (1920–1926)
1	Sundar Singh Majithia		12 October 1920	14 August 1921	306 days
2	Kharak Singh		14 August 1921	19 February 1922	189 days
3	Sundar Singh Ramgarhia (Note: Alternatively spelt as 'Ramgarhiya'.)		19 February 1922	16 July 1922	147 days
4	Mehtab Singh		16 July 1922	27 April 1925	2 years, 285 days
5	Mangal Singh		27 April 1925	2 October 1926	1 year, 219 days
After Sikh Gurdwara Act (1926-till now)
(2)	Kharak Singh		2 October 1926	12 October 1930	4 years, 10 days
6	Tara Singh		12 October 1930	17 June 1933	2 years, 248 days
7	Gopal Singh Qaumi		17 June 1933	18 June 1933	1 day
8	Partap Singh Shankar		18 June 1933	13 June 1936	2 years, 361 days
(6)	Master Tara Singh		13 June 1936	19 November 1944	8 years, 159 days
9	Mohan Singh Nagoke		19 November 1944	28 June 1948	3 years, 222 days
10	Udham Singh Nagoke		28 June 1948	18 March 1950	1 year, 263 days
11	Chanan Singh Urara		18 March 1950	26 November 1950	253 days
(10)	Udham Singh Nagoke		26 November 1950	29 June 1952	1 year, 216 days
(6)	Tara Singh		29 June 1952	5 October 1952	98 days
12	Preetam Singh Khuranj		5 October 1952	18 January 1954	1 year, 105 days
13	Ishar Singh Majhail		18 January 1954	7 February 1955	1 year, 20 days
(6)	Tara Singh		7 February 1955	21 May 1955	103 days
14	Bawa Harkrishan Singh		21 May 1955	7 July 1955	47 days
15	Gian Singh Rarewala		7 July 1955	16 October 1955	101 days
(6)	Tara Singh		16 October 1955	16 November 1958	3 years, 31 days
16	Prem Singh Lalpur		16 November 1958	7 March 1960	1 year, 112 days
(6)	Tara Singh		7 March 1960	30 April 1960	54 days
17	Ajit Singh Bala		30 April 1960	10 March 1961	314 days
(6)	Tara Singh		10 March 1961	11 March 1962	1 year, 1 day
18	Kirpal Singh 'Chak Sherewal'		11 March 1962	2 October 1962	205 days
19	Sant Chanan Singh		2 October 1962	30 November 1972	10 years, 59 days
20	Mohan Singh Tur		30 November 1972	6 June 1973	188 days
21	Gurcharan Singh Tohra		6 June 1973	23 March 1986	12 years, 290 days
22	Kabal Singh		23 March 1986	30 November 1986	252 days
(21)	Gurcharan Singh Tohra		30 November 1986	28 November 1990	3 years, 363 days
23	Baldev Singh Sibiya		28 November 1990	13 November 1991	350 days
(21)	Gurcharan Singh Tohra		13 November 1991	16 March 1999	7 years, 95 days
24	Jagir Kaur		16 March 1999	30 November 2000	1 year, 259 days
25	Jagdev Singh Talwandi		30 November 2000	27 November 2001	362 days
26	Kirpal Singh Badungar		27 November 2001	27 July 2003	1 year, 212 days
(21)	Gurcharan Singh Tohra		27 July 2003	31 March 2004	278 days
27	Alwinderpal Singh Pakhoke		1 April 2004	22 September 2004	174 days
(24)	Jagir Kaur		23 September 2004	22 November 2005	1 year, 60 days
28	Avtar Singh Makkar		23 November 2005	4 November 2016	10 years, 347 days
(26)	Kirpal Singh Badungar		5 November 2016	28 November 2017	1 year, 23 days
29	Gobind Singh Longowal		29 November 2017	27 November 2020	2 years, 364 days
(24)	Jagir Kaur		27 November 2020	29 November 2021	1 year, 2 days
30	Harjinder Singh Dhami	Harjinder Singh Dhami ਹਰਜਿੰਦਰ ਸਿੰਘ ਧਾਮੀ	29 November 2021	Incumbent	4 years, 338 days

== Statistics ==
=== List of presidents by their tenure ===
#	President	Total terms	Term of office	
#	President	Total terms	Longest continuous term	Total duration as president
1	Gurcharan Singh Tohra	4	12 years, 290 days	24 years, 296 days
2	Master Tara Singh	7	8 years, 159 days	15 years, 329 days
3	Avtar Singh Makkar	1	10 years, 347 days	10 years, 347 days
4	Sant Chanan Singh	1	10 years, 59 days	10 years, 59 days
5	Harjinder Singh Dhami*	1*	4 years, 338 days	4 years, 338 days
6	Kharak Singh	2	4 years, 10 days	4 years, 199 days
7	Jagir Kaur	3	1 year, 259 days	3 years, 321 days
8	Mohan Singh Nagoke	1	3 years, 222 days	3 years, 222 days
9	Udham Singh Nagoke	2	1 year, 263 days	3 years, 124 days
10	Gobind Singh Longewal	1	2 years, 364 days	2 years, 364 days
11	Partap Singh	1	2 years, 361 days	2 years, 361 days
12	Mehtab Singh	1	2 years, 285 days	2 years, 285 days
13	Kirpal Singh Badungar	2	1 year, 212 days	2 years, 245 days
14	Mangal Singh	1	1 year, 219 days	1 year, 219 days
15	Prem Singh Lalpur	1	1 year, 112 days	1 year, 122 days
16	Preetam Singh Khuranj	1	1 year, 105 days	1 year, 105 days
17	Isher Singh Majhail	1	1 year, 20 days	1 year, 20 days
18	Jagdev Singh Talwandi	1	362 days	362 days
19	Baldev Singh Sibiya	1	350 days	350 days
20	Ajit Singh Bala	1	314 days	314 days
21	Sunder Singh Majithia	1	306 days	306 days
22	Kabal Singh	1	252 days	252 days
23	Chanan Singh Urar	1	250 days	250 days
24	Kirpal Singh Chak Sherewal	1	205 days	205 days
25	Mohan Singh Tur	1	188 days	188 days
26	Alwinderpal Singh Pakhoke	1	174 days	174 days
27	Sundar Singh Ramgarhia	1	147 days	147 days
28	Gian Singh Rarewala	1	101 days	101 days
29	Bawa Harkrishan Singh	1	47 days	47 days
30	Gopal Singh Quami	1	1 day	1 day

== Controversies ==
=== Casteism ===
The SGPC has been accused of representing the interests of Jat Sikhs over other castes and its membership and leadership being dominated by members of the Jat community, which makes other castes feel left out and discriminated against. In defence, the SGPC's early history of fighting casteism has been highlighted and the actions they take against reported instances of caste-based discrimination. Also, a former Jathedar of the Akal Takht claims to be from a lower-caste background.

=== Allegations of apathy to heritage ===
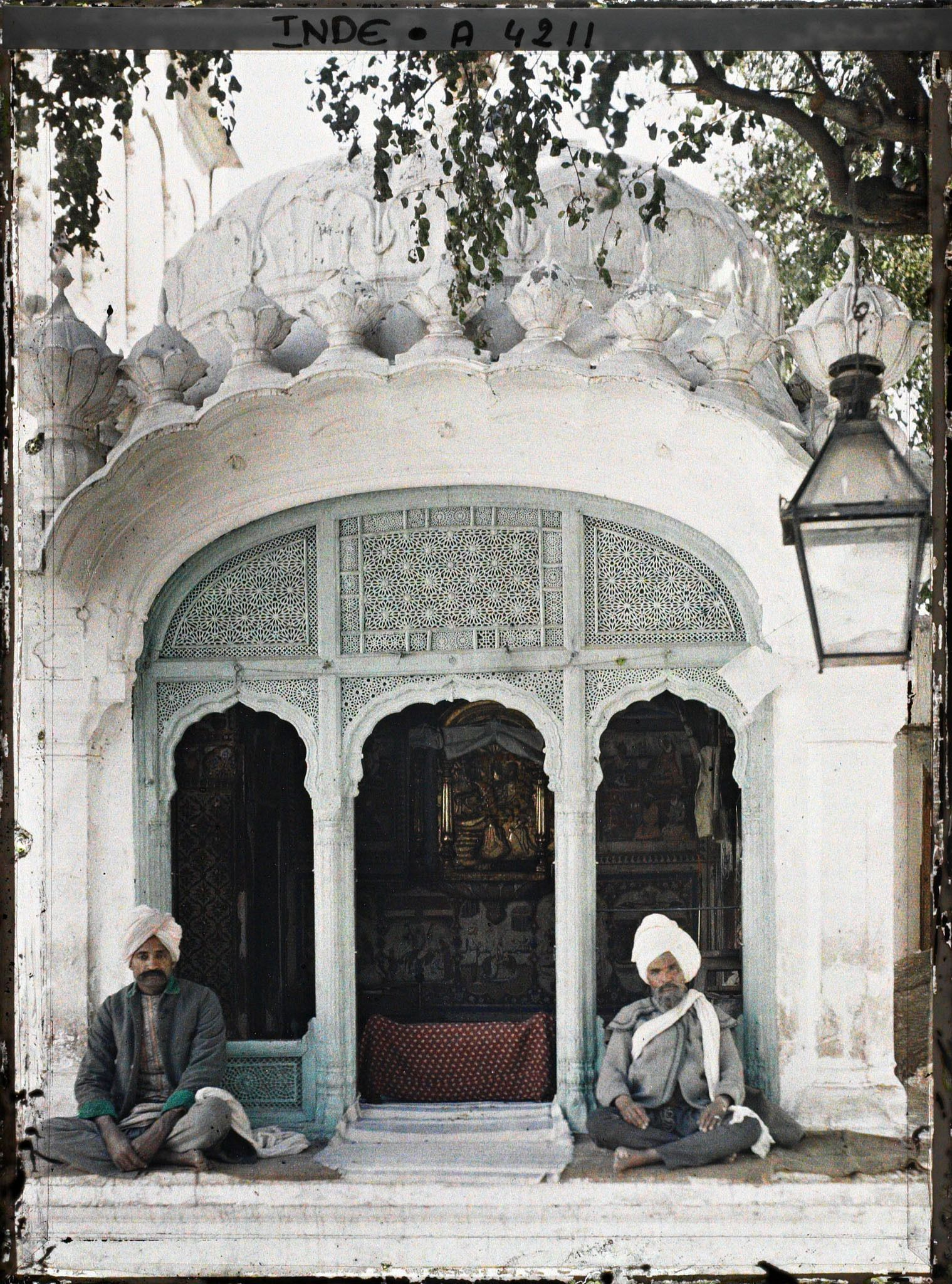
Colour photograph with the caption of ‘Two Sikhs sit in front of the small sanctuary next to the western door of the Darbar Sahib (Golden Temple)’, taken on 15 January 1914 by a Frenchman by the name of Stéphane Passet. This structure and the frescoes seen inside are no longer extant and were demolished some time later

The SGPC has been criticized by Sikh organizations and individuals for having an apathetic and destructive attitude towards historical Sikh heritage sites, artwork, and architecture. In response to these criticisms, the SGPC announced that it has launched a project to document Sikh heritage. As many as ninety percent of Sikh heritage monuments have been destroyed in Punjab in the name of renovation and kar seva. Historic trees associated with Sikh history are also at risk due to neglectful and poorly made judgements without consulting botanical experts, such as strangling the roots and base with concrete and marble, covering the trees with fibre glass, and erecting steel beams around the trunks. Efforts are ongoing to revive and preserve the life of the Beri trees surrounding the Golden Temple. The SGPC has also been criticized for their lack of action on preventing beadbi (desecrations) of the Guru Granth Sahib and other Sikh scriptures from occurring. Large amounts of historical Sikh scriptural manuscripts have been systematically "cremated" (burnt to destruction) over the years at secretive ‘Angitha Sahib’ gurdwaras in Punjab.

According to Sikh scholar, Gurtej Singh, on who is to blame for the plight of Sikh historical heritage:

Whether it is the Shiromani Gurudwara Prabandhak Committee or the Akal Takht or even the political Akali Dal which draws its strength from the former two, there is no appreciation for our heritage. Scholars like us do not matter in the scheme of things, because we obstruct their commercial aspirations. The SGPC patronises these babas and they do not realise that they are converting history into mythology by destroying historical evidence.

— Gurtej Singh

On 6 September 2023, the SGPC announced plans to digitize Sikh literature and scriptures kept in the collection of Sri Guru Ramdas Library in Amritsar. There are plans to make the digitized works available to the public on a website in the near future.

=== Lack of action towards missionaries ===
After being criticised for their lack of action in responding to the growing number of Sikhs leaving the fold and converting to Christianity and not addressing the caste and social issues that give impetus to the phenomenon, and as a response to the allegations and growing tension between the local Sikh and Christian communities, the SGPC had announced a drive called Ghar Ghar Andar Dharamsaal (meaning 'sacred shrine within every home') to counter missionaries targeting Sikhs and to educate the Sikh population on the tenets of their faith.

=== Monopoly on determining Sikh identity ===
The SGPC has been accused for enforcing their standards on who and who is not considered a Sikh. This leaves many heterodox sects, such as Nirmalas, Nirankaris, Udasis, and others feeling marginalized and erased from the Sikh community by the orthodox SGPC. The SGPC has clarified that members of the Udasi and Nirmala sects are "Sikhs".

=== Sexism ===
Women currently are unofficially banned from singing or performing kirtan (religious devotional singing and musical performance) in sanctum sanctorum of the Golden Temple, a gurdwara under the management of the SGPC. The Punjab Legislative Assembly passed a motion to allow women to perform there in 2019.

=== Religious discrimination ===
Traditional Muslim rababis and kirtanis, including claimed descendants of Bhai Mardana (companion of first Sikh Guru Nanak), have been banned from performing at the Golden Temple since 1947 as the SGPC has altered the rules to only allow baptized Khalsa Sikhs to perform services at the Golden Temple. Before partition, they were granted special allowance to perform at the temple.

=== Governance ===
==== Elections ====
The Sikh Gurdwaras Act 1925 provides for elections every five years. But the last elections took place in September 2011 when the Shiromani Akali Dal and Sant Samaj won 157 out of 170 elected seats. Opposition parties including AAP and Congress say the delay benefits the Akali Dal, who has dominated the body for decades. In 2016 Supreme Court reinstated the 2011 house after Sehajdhari voting issue.

===== Akali Dal Control =====
Shiromani Akali Dal has had almost unbroken control of SGPC for decades and is criticised by its opponents for allegedly using Sikh institutions for its political interest.

=== Corruption ===
Allegations of large-scale corruption have been claimed against the SGPC.

== See also ==
- Jathedar of Akal Takht
- Chief Khalsa Diwan
- Balwant Singh Nandgarh
- Delhi Sikh Gurdwara Management Committee
- Haryana Sikh Gurdwara Parbandhak Committee
- Pakistan Sikh Gurdwara Prabandhak Committee
