= Herbert Alexander Casson =

British civil administrator in Punjab

Herbert Alexander Casson CSI (19 May 1867 – 1952) was a British administrator who served in the Indian Civil Service and as Deputy Commissioner in the Punjab.

== Biography ==
Casson was born in Old, Northamptonshire, the son of Rev. George Casson and Frances Gilbert. He was educated at Marlborough College and Hertford College, Oxford.

After graduating he joined the Indian Civil Service and arrived in India in 1889. and was appointed Deputy Commissioner in the Punjab in 1888. He served as Additional District Magistration for Bannu from 1893, Deputy Commissioner for Jhelum district from 1896, and later as Commissioner for Lahore Division and Ambala Division. He served as President of the Punjab Legislative Council between 1922 and 1925.

He married Gertrude Russell, daughter of Sir Andrew Hamilton Russell, on 23 October 1897 at Bombay. They had one child, Joan Gilbert Casson, who married Adam Chetwynd, 9th Viscount Chetwynd and was the mother of Adam Chetwynd, 10th Viscount Chetwynd.

Casson died in 1952.
