= Cochin House =

Building in India

Coordinates: 28.623410°N 77.216490°E

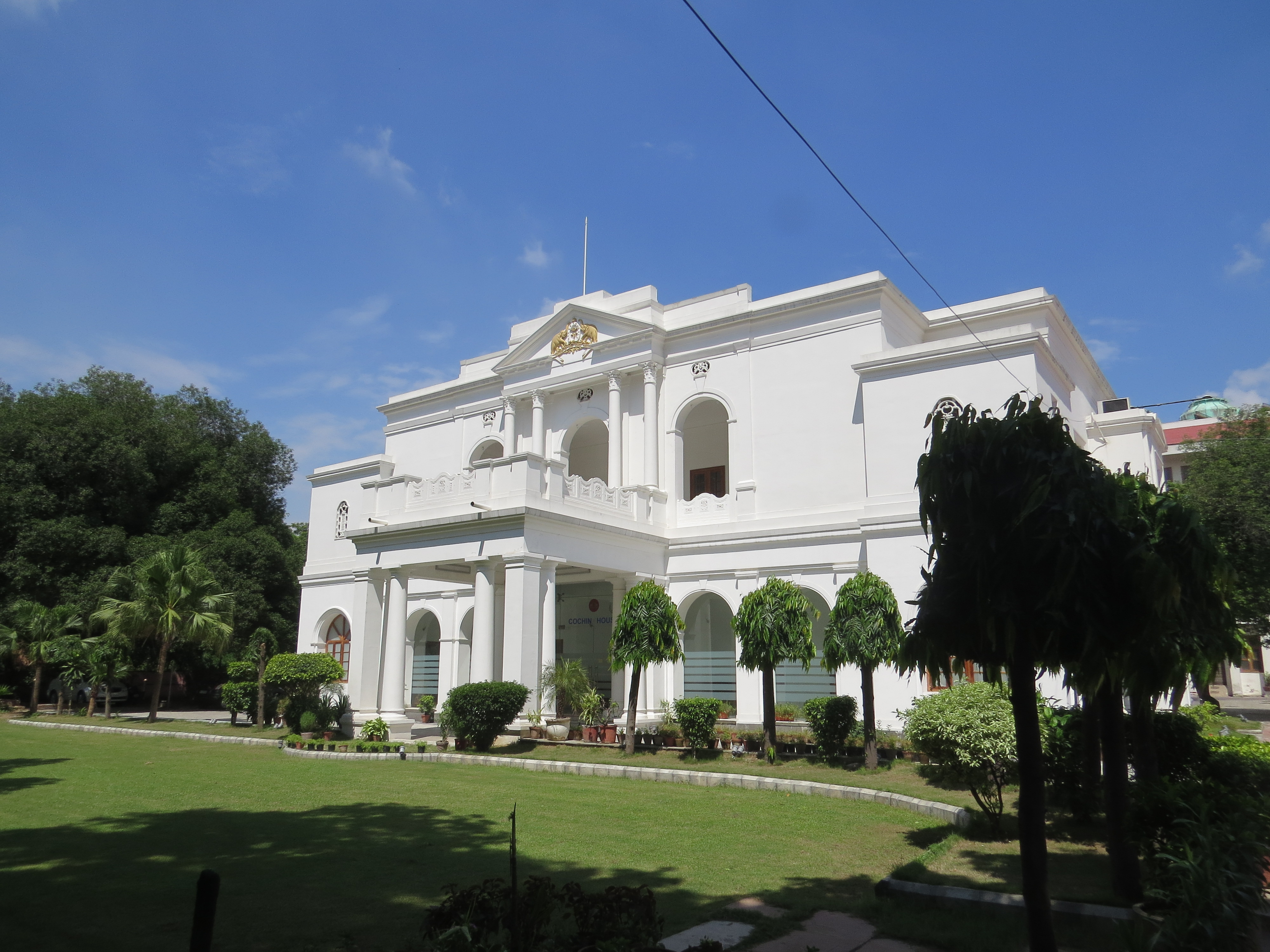
Cochin House

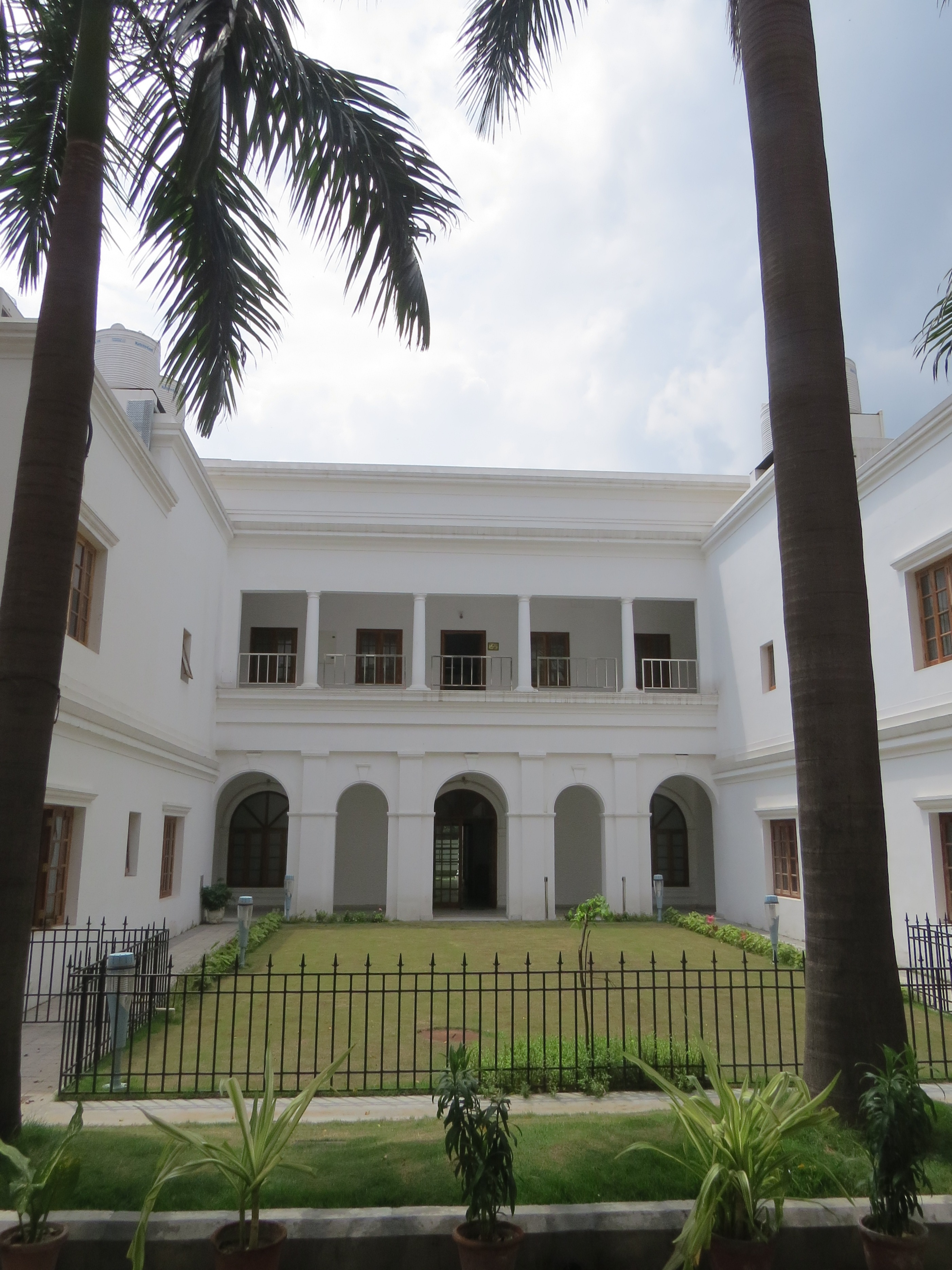
Open courtyard of Cochin House

Cochin House is the former residence of the Maharaja of Cochin in Delhi. It located at Jantar Mantar Road 3 in New Delhi’s Lutyens’ Bungalow Zone. It is also known as Cochin State Palace. It was originally known as "Vykunt". It was built between 1903 and 1911 by Punjabi contractor Sujan Singh Hadaliwale. It was later purchased in 1920 by H.H. Rama Varma, the Maharaja of Cochin, to serve as his city residence during sessions of the Chamber of Princes. .After Indian independence, the building became property of the Government of Kerala and now functions as a part of the Kerala House complex, functioning as the office of the Resident Commissioner

== History ==
Origins (1903–1911):The Cochin House was constructed between 1903 and 1911. It was Designed by British architect Walter Sykes George and constructed by Sujan Singh and his son Sir Sobha Singh. The bungalow was known as Vaikund or Vyukunt and was part of the original New Delhi project that has the building of Rashtrapati Bhavan and the North and South Blocks. It was quired by the Maharaja of Cochin to use for his durbar and princely functions during the Chamber of Princes, founded by new British India constitution. It was then renamed as "Cochin State Palace". During World War II the house hosted war offices and served as the office of the U.S. President’s Personal Representative from 1941 to 1943 in British India. After Independence, when Cochin joined with India Union, the house became state property of Kerala Government. It is today a part of the wider Kerala House complex, which functions as an embassy of the state to the central government. In 2013, there were plans to renovate the building.

== Architecture ==
Cochin House exemplifies early 20th-century Lutyens’ Delhi style, combining red brick and plastered facades with classical porticoes and colonnaded verandahs. The plan is roughly rectangular, with a central hall flanked by reception rooms and private chambers. Notable features include the symmetrical facade with a deep porch supported by Ionic columns. High ceilings and tall sash windows are designed, allowing for cross-ventilation in Delhi’s hot climate. Traditional lime plaster walls and terrazzo flooring, consistent with period materials at that time period.

== See also ==
- Travancore House
