= Zainabadi Mahal =

Concubine of Aurangzeb

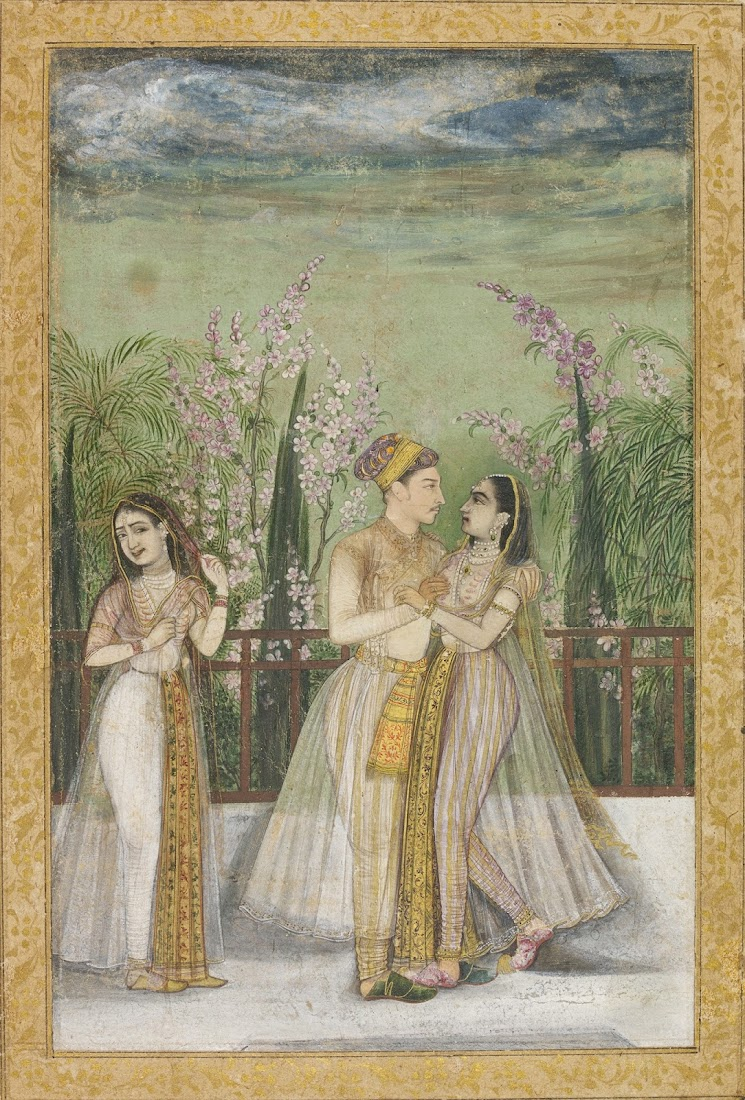
- Aurangzeb and Zainabadi Mahal, c.1640
- Born: Hira Bai; Kashmir, Mughal Empire
- Died: c. 1654; Aurangabad, Mughal Empire
- Burial: Aurangabad

Zainabadi Mahal (Persian: زين آبادی محل; born Hira Bai; died c. 1654) was a concubine of Mughal emperor Aurangzeb.

== Life ==
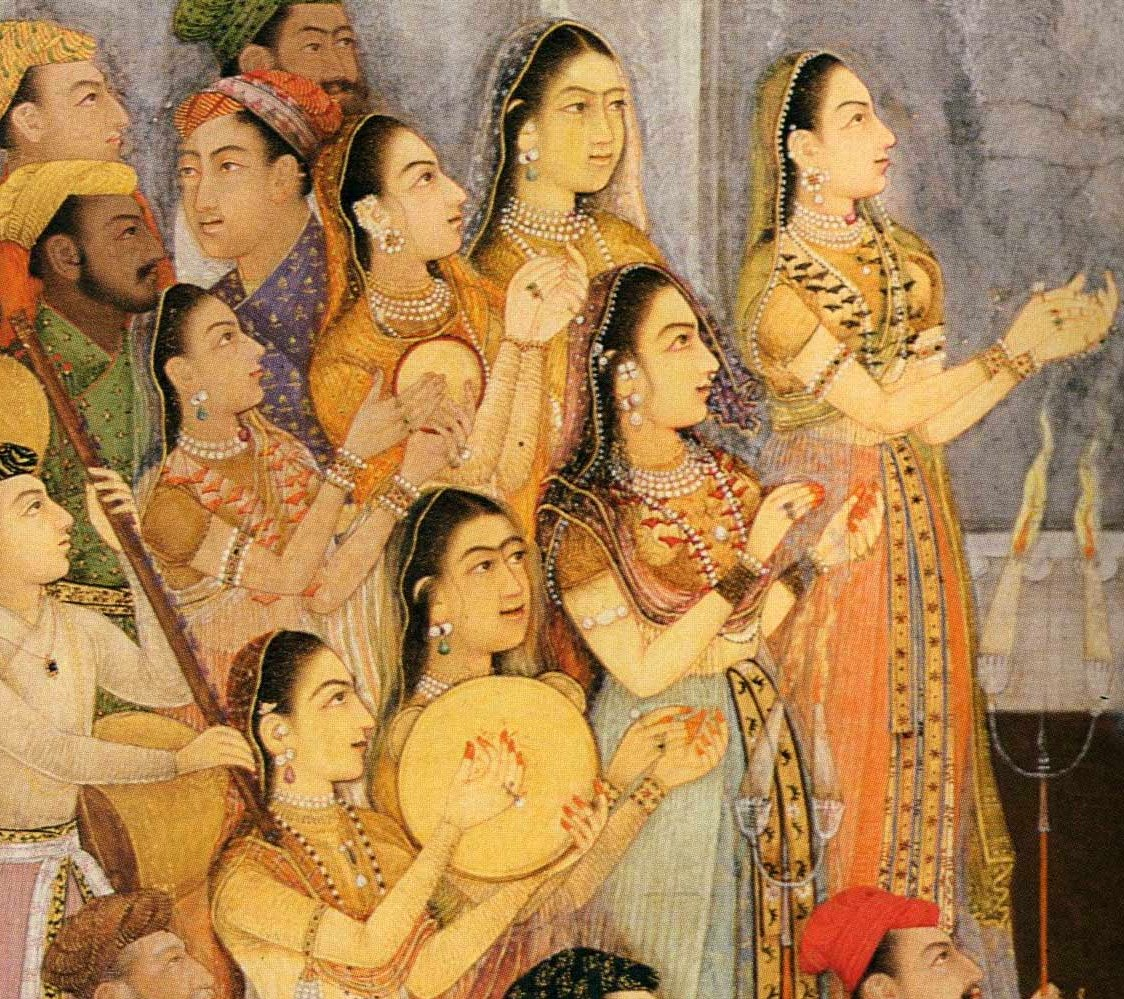
Singers and dancers attending Aurangzeb, Hira Bai possibly among them.

Described as the 'darling of Aurangzeb's youth', Zainabadi Mahal was a Kashmiri Hindu, abandoned by her parents and sold in the market. She was a slave girl of Mir Khalil, and had been a singing and dancing girl. Mir Khalil was the son-in-law of Asaf Khan, and was successively surnamed Muftakhar Khan, Sipahdar Khan, and Khan-i-Zaman. He was sent to the Deccan as Chief of the Artillery in the 23rd year of Shah Jahan, 1649–50. In 1653, he became commandant of Dharur. It was only in Aurangzeb's reign that he became subahdar of Khandesh.

In 1652 or 1653, during his viceroyalty of the Deccan, the prince went with the ladies of his harem to the garden of Zainabad, Burhanpur, named Ahu-khanah (Deer Park). Here he saw Zainabadi, who had come there with the other slaves of Khan-i-Zaman's wife (the Prince's maternal aunt), and was jumping up to pluck a mango from the tree. Her musical skills and charms captivated Aurangzeb. He had fallen in love with her, and negotiated with Mir Khalil to give her to him. Mir Khalil proposed an exchange between Zainabadi and one of Aurangzeb's slave girls, Chatter Bai.

She was surnamed Zainabadi Mahal, because ever since from the reign of Emperor Akbar, it had been ordained that the names of the women of the imperial harem should not be mentioned in public, they should be designated by some epithet, derived either from the place of their birth or the city or country where they had entered the imperial harem. Aurangzeb then lingered in Burhanpur for the next nine months in spite of Shah Jahan's repeated orders urging him to go to Aurangabad. One day, Zainabadi taunted him by offering him a cup of wine in order to test his love. This love-affair proceeded to such lengths as to reach Shah Jahan's ears. His elder brother, Dara Shikoh, made this incident known to their father in order to slander Aurangzeb.

She probably accompanied him to Daulatabad when he made a month long journey there in November 1653, and died in around 1654. She was buried at Aurangabad close to the big tank. On the day of her death the prince became very unwell; in extreme agitation he rode out to hunt. Niccolao Manucci, a Venetian adventurer, who traveled through India during the period reports that after she died, Aurangzeb "vowed never to take up wine or to listen to music," and would later claim that God had been very gracious to him by putting an end to that dancing girl's life, for through her the prince had "committed so many sins that he can risk of never reigning by being occupied in such vices."

== In literature ==
- Zainabadi is a character in Khushwant Singh's historical novel Delhi: A Novel (1990).
- Zainabadi is a character in Hamid Ismailov's historical novel A Poet and Bin-Laden: A Reality Novel (2018).
