= N. Chandrasekharan Nair =

Indian scholar

N. Chandrasekharan Nair is a noted Hindi scholar. He founded Kerala Hindi Sahitya Academy and was former Head of the Department of Hindi at Mahatma Gandhi College, Thiruvananthapuram, Kerala. He received the Ministry of Human Resource Development’s award for Hindi writers in non-Hindi speaking areas for 2004-05 and the 2008 Maharashtra Hindi Sahitya Academy award. He has campaigned to have Hindi declared India's official language.

He is the recipient of India's highly prestigious award Padma Shri 2020 for his work in the field of literature and education.

== Career ==
He was an adviser to fifteen ministries from 1982 to 2009. He was awarded a research fellowship by U.G.C and Emeritus Professor of U.G.C.

=== Writing ===
He writes in Hindi and Malayalam. He is a poet, novelist, dramatist, story writer, research scholar, painter and critic in art and literary fields. He received seven national awards along with fifty-nine other awards. Honored and awarded in the third world Hindi conference at New Delhi along with Thakazhi Sivasankara Pillai and other well-known writers of the Hindi world.

Nair wrote more than fifty introductions to the works of other writers. He has written more than 800 periodical articles. He published fifty six books. More than a dozen of his books were selected as textbooks by Indian Universities. Seven professors have taken PhDs on his work.

=== Painting ===
Nair produced nearly one hundred paintings. He has exhibited at Kerala House New Delhi.

=== Organizations ===
He was elected chairman of the Gandhi Centenary Committee in Ottapalam and has been elected vice-president of the same in Palakkad district. Nair established Gandhi Vignan Bhavan in Ottapalam and constituted a committee for running that institution.

Nair established many committees of students such as Gandhi Peace Corps, Bharath Yuvak Samaj etc.

Nair was a member of Sreerammakrishna Ashramam Ottapalam. He presided over many functions there.

=== Kerala Hindi Sahitiya Academy ===
In 1980 Kerala Hindi Sahitiya Academy was started as a Sanstha in Trivandrum. The main aims and objectives of the KHSA are to promote and protect the nation's integration through literary and cultural activities. The organization was started by a working committee headed by Nair.

The academy was inaugurated on 13 June 1982 and registered as a charitable society. The first Sahitiya Puraskar by the academy was awarded to Sri Dev Keraliya. Over the years, the organization encouraged hundreds of writers. These writers are rewarded on a regular basis for their originality and commitment to Hindi. The organization established an atmosphere and a literary trend for Hindi languages across the State. The institution has a research library. KHSA has published many books, some of which were awarded at a national level. Six students earned Doctoral Degrees under the program.
