= The Company of Women =

The Company of Women may refer to:

- The Company of Women (Singh novel), a 1999 novel by Indian author Khushwant Singh
- The Company of Women (Gordon novel), a 1981 novel by Irish-American author Mary Gordon
