= Gurbux Singh =

Gurbux Singh may refer to:

- Gurbux Singh (field hockey, born 1935)
- Gurbux Singh (Indian Army officer)
