= Bola Shareef =

Bola Shareef بولا شریف
- Village
- Country: Pakistan
- Region: Punjab Province
- District: Khushab District
- Time zone: UTC+5 (PST)

Bola Shareef (Urdu: بولا شریف) is a town in municipal committee of Hadali, of Khushab District in Punjab province of Pakistan. It is part of Khushab tehsil. Bola is famous for its waan. The word waan, meaning a water well, refers to a Baoli built here by Sher Shah Suri in the 16th century. He built similar structures along every route his army followed. This Baoli was a source of fresh water not only for humans but it was built in a way that animals as huge as elephants could go down to drink water directly from the well. The people started settling in the area due to availability of fresh water. The "Baoli" (water well) is still there, though water wells are no more in use and the condition of the well is deteriorating. Appropriate measures should be taken to preserve the well as a historical monument.

Bhood were the first tribe to settle in Bola Shareef. Sumbali, Bochal, Kalyar, Wadhal, Rajpoots, Syed and Jethal are tribes of Bola.

The shrine of Baba Khaki Sultan, located in Bola Shareef, Punjab, is a popular Sufi shrine, and the annual Urs festival commemorating his death is celebrated there with great fervour on the 20 Harh ہاڑھ (Punjabi month). People come from far off places to join the celebrations. Baba Khaghla Wala and Mayi Sath Nhrahi shrines are also located in Bola.

A local government election was held in 2015.
