= Sobha Singh (builder) =

Indian contractor and real estate developer

Sardar Bahadur, Sir Sobha Singh (Kt, O.B.E., M.L.C., M.P.)

Member of Council of States
- Nominated by: Victor Hope, 2nd Marquess of Linlithgow

Swatantra Party Chairman, Delhi Unit
- Preceded by: Sardar Bahadur Lal Singh
- Succeeded by: Dr. Hans Raj Pasricha
- Nominated by: Minoo Masani

Personal details
- Born: 5 March 1888 Hadali, Khushab, Sargodha, British Raj (now Pakistan)
- Died: 18 April 1978 (aged 90) New Delhi, Delhi, India
- Party: Swatantra Party
- Relations: Sardar Inder Singh (grandfather); Sujan Singh Hadaliwale (father); Lakshmi Devi (mother); Sardar Ujjal Singh (brother); Lady Sobha Singh (spouse); Sir Teja Singh Malik (brother-in-law); Bhagwant Singh (son); Khushwant Singh (son); Brigadier Gurbux Singh (son); Daljit Singh (son); Mohinder Kaur (daughter); Rukhsana Sultana (relative)
- Occupation: Real Estate Developer; Contractor; Businessman; Politician
- Known for: Building most of Lutyens' Delhi
- Awards: Order of the British Empire; Sardar Bahadur; Knighthood

Honorary Magistrate, Sardar Bahadur, Sir Sobha Singh Kt, O.B.E., M.L.C., M.P. (March 5, 1888 – 18 April 1978) was an Indian civil contractor, prominent builder, and real estate developer contracted to construct several major structures during the development of New Delhi by the British as the seat of its colonial empire.

Not only a builder, but he was also a subordinate architect and part of the Council of States laying the foundation of development schemes across cities and running various businesses. He came to be described as "Adhi Dilli ka Malik" (the owner of half of Delhi) as he virtually owned half of Lutyens' Delhi. He played the largest part in the early industrial construction in Delhi in the 1920s and 1930s, along with being a main participant in the Westernization and modernist collective Indian identity. He was a proficient real estate developer and a Sikh business icon.

He also became the first Indian president of the New Delhi Municipal Council and held the post four times, in 1938, 1942, and 1945-46. Appointed an Officer of the Order of the British Empire (O.B.E.) in the 1938 Birthday Honours, he was subsequently appointed a member of the Council of States. He was knighted in the 1944 Birthday Honours. He also built Sujan Singh Park, named after his father, New Delhi's first apartment complex, which only had bungalows till then, in 1945, designed by Walter Sykes George. He became a member of the Central Legislative Assembly, but opposed and desisted from any sort of politics.

== Early life and family ==
Sir Sobha Singh was born in 1888, in the village of Hadali in Khushab, Shahpur District – then part of British India (now Pakistan). He was the elder of the two sons of Sardar Bahadur Sujan Singh and Lakshmi Devi, the younger one being Sardar Bahadur Ujjal Singh, who was a member of Parliament in India along with the governor of Punjab and Tamil Nadu.

He was pulled out of school before giving his final exams, as his father believed that to make money one only needed addition, subtraction, multiplication, division, and how to calculate simple and compound interest, although he wanted to learn English, he could not till much later. He was married at the age of 17 to a 13-year-old girl from a village named Mitha Tiwana neighboring Hadali, her name was Varyam Kaur- but to others she was known as Lady Sobha Singh. She was the daughter of Sardar Harbel Singh, Rais, of Jaranwala who owned cotton spinning factories. Sobha Singh's father, Bhai Sujan Singh Hadaliwale, constructed many buildings in Sargodha and Multan.

== Early career ==
Sujan Singh and Sobha Singh were called to the Central Public Works Department to start plans for the construction of New Delhi. He started by developing the roads of Delhi, including Alipur Road. Sobha Singh and his father were guests at celebrations of the Coronation of the King and Queen near Delhi in 1911 due to their work in canal irrigation, development, and construction of roads and rail tracks, invited by Sir Malcom Hailey, Baron of Shahpur. Hailey knew Sujan Singh since 1905 while constructing sites in the Shahpur area. Compared to the other contracting families, they were more experienced, they owned land in Shahpur, had an extensive camel transport business, and contracted the Kalka-Simla Railway line.

=== Delhi Conspiracy Case ===
On 23 December 1912, he was an eyewitness to the Delhi Conspiracy Case, when the Viceroy's elephant was bombed, although no one except an umbrella-bearer was killed. When people dispersed after seeing the bombing, all the witnesses believed that the English would massacre the local Indians, hence, Sujan Singh and Sobha Singh went to Gurdwara Sis Ganj Sahib and shut the gates of the Gurdwara to make sure the Guru Granth Sahib was safe. Once night fell, they both walked back to their residence in the dark, while Sujan Singh muttered, 'Wahe Guru, Wahe Guru'.

=== Foundation Stone of Delhi ===
Sobha Singh's first job was to relocate the foundation stones from where the King and Queen had laid them, in Kingsway. Under cover of darkness (so it would not be taken as a bad omen), he moved them to the new site 11 kilometers away on Raisina Hill, and was only given 16 rupees for the job. Sobha Singh was accepted as a senior-grade contractor in the Construction of New Delhi. He lived in his father's house on the Old Mill Road now known as Rafi Marg.

== World War I ==
While Sujan Singh toured Shahpur, Hadali and Mian Channu to recruit soldiers for World War I, Sobha Singh stayed in Delhi and tried his prospects in the textile industry and Ujjal Singh managed the properties in Punjab. Due to World War I Sir Sobha Singh, Sardar Sujan Singh and his family shifted near Sabzi Mandi in Delhi and worked in the textile industry, in a cotton mill. It was originally called Jumna Mill but then he changed the name to Khalsa Cotton Spinning and Weaving Mills. The mill was not successful and often had to shut down due to lack of money and they were on the verge of bankruptcy. In 1919, a fire swallowed the mill and turned it to ashes. They were very concerned that the English might lose the war and New Delhi would have never been built, but that did not happen. He then learned English to communicate with the Englishmen during this time.

== Contracting career ==
=== Construction of Delhi ===
He was a member of the Delhi Municipal Committee, the Improvement Trust, which was planning New Delhi, and the New Delhi Municipal Committee. He became the first Indian President of the New Delhi Municipal Council and held the post four times, in 1938, 1942, and 1945–46. This was a major achievement as the British did not trust Indians as much as they did themselves.

He was given many titles, such as Sardar Sahib, Honorary Magistrate, Sardar Bahadur, then Order of the British Empire, knighthood, nomination into the Central Legislative Assembly and nomination to the Council of States.

"Sobha Singh didn't have time to worry about politics. He just kept constructing and building and making money."

— Gurbaksh Singh

==== Kingsway Development ====
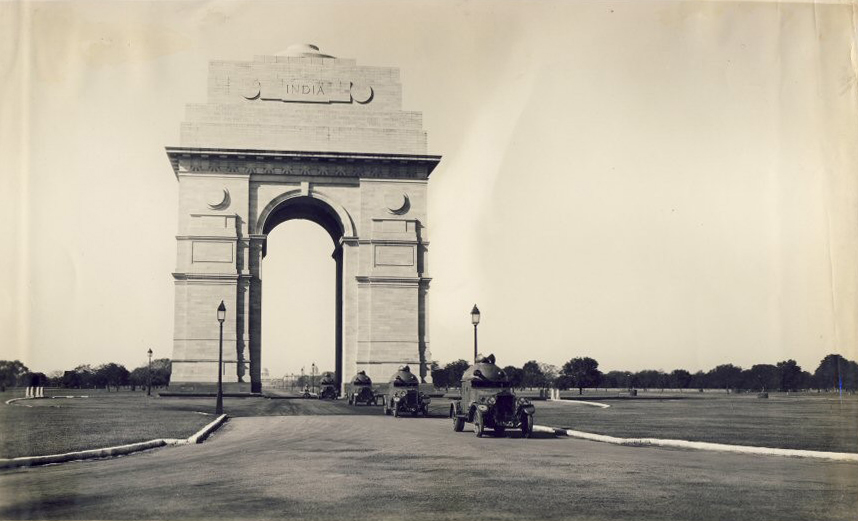
India Gate in 1930s

Sir Malcom Hailey allowed Sobha Singh to buy several extensive sites like the Rashtrapati Bhavan, India Gate, Vijay Chowk and other sites at as little as Rs 2 per square yard, freehold as a reward for their service in the First World War. He bought the land of Connaught Place in 1921 and was given the title of 'Sardar Sahib' in the 1922 birthday celebrations. He hired around 6,000 Bagadi laborers and dozens of supervisors, clerks and accountants with stone imported from Dholpur. The Bagadis were famous for building Mughal monuments like the Taj Mahal, Red Fort, Humayun's Tomb and others. The laborers had very low wages- 80 paisa for men and 60 paisa for women per day. During this time Sujan Singh left for Punjab to help his younger son, Ujjal Singh.

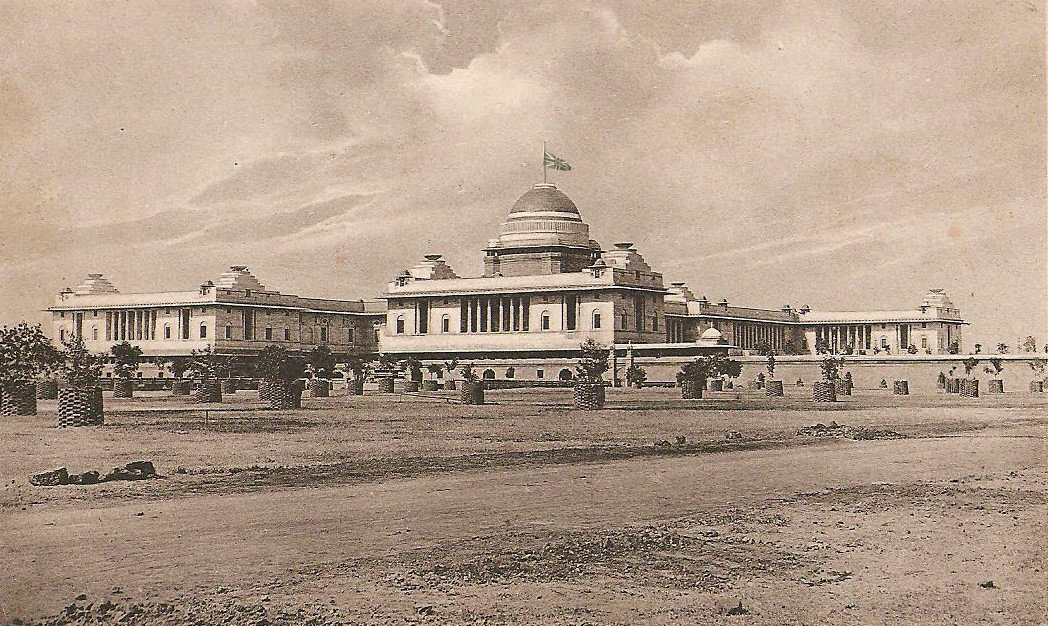
An old photo of the Viceroy's House (Rashtrapati Bhavan).

He had gone back to Mian Channu when his father fell ill. Sujan Singh had died at 65 of illness in their Haveli at Mian Channu. Sobha Singh originally lived in Old Mill Road, then shifted to Ajmeri Gate and then shifted to a double-storied house in Jantar Mantar Road, which became a road for wealthy Sikh contractors, currently Kerala House, and bought an Oldsmobile from an English engineer. Later he had built the National Museum as well which houses India's famous Dancing Girl. St. Columba's School was also constructed by him. The official horticulturist imported some exotic trees like the sausage tree and the African tulip tree from East Africa to line the streets of Delhi, to make sure that the city remained cool in summer. During the construction of Rashtrapati Bhavan, India Gate, the Secretariat Buildings, and more, there was one casualty; one laborer fell from a crane while constructing the India Gate, and the family was well compensated.

==== Connaught Place Development ====
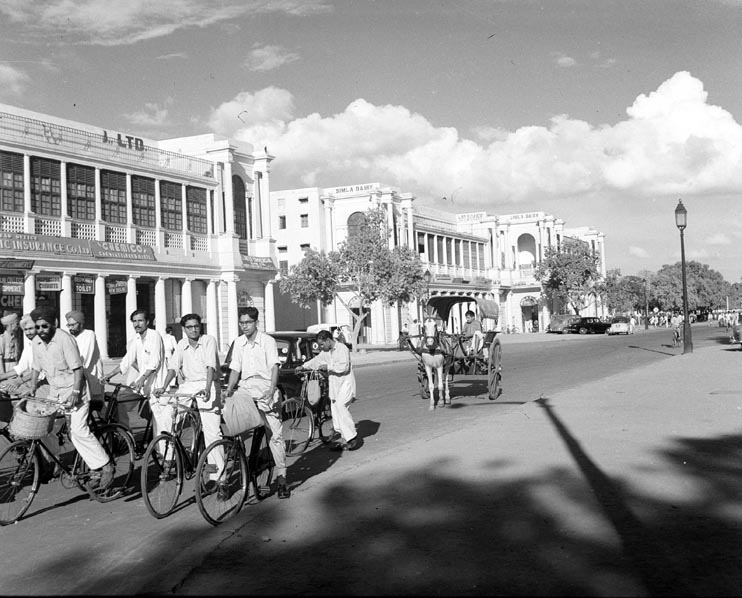
View of Sujan Singh Block in Connaught Place.

Connaught Place was privately owned, as the government wanted to encourage private interests, and they did not want Delhi to be solely an official city. He bought extensive sites at 2 rupees per yard, the current cost would be 80,800 per yard. With a good gambling mindset, he was the first to start building in Connaught Place, he first constructed Sujan Singh Block A (now Wengers Block) and owned from there all the way to the other side known as American Express Block, the buildings between were also called Sujan Singh Blocks. He then built the Regal Building, one of Delhi's first cinemas, along with the Rivoli Cinemas in the same area. Maharaja Jiwajirao Scindia gave him a plot of land in Delhi to build a royal house as an embassy in the capital and a station for Gwalior Potteries, but it became too costly for him after it was completed, so it was not bought back from him, and Sobha Singh continued owning it, he rented it to shopkeepers.

On 23 December 1931, Lord Irwin and his wife came by train for the inaugural ceremony, Sobha Singh was one of the dignitaries to receive them at the platform. A bomb on the tracks was set off, and missed Sobha Singh, along with the Irwins as it blew up the compartment next to them. According to him, the Viceroy and Vicereine went through the ceremony, "unperturbed, as if nothing happened."

==== Cornwallis Road Development ====
Sujan Singh Park was built in 1945 by the Anglo-Indian British architect Walter Sykes George and Sir Sobha Singh as the city's first apartment complex and was part of the Lutyen's plan, almost all colonies made by the Government of India followed the blueprint of Sujan Singh Park. The entire complex was raised to house British and American military and civilian officers during World War II to help in the war effort. In the early 1940s, Sobha Singh got the contract from the chief engineer of Delhi, Bahadur Suleman Khan, who himself migrated to Karachi after the Partition of India. It was known as Delhi's "drawing room".

“The land of the concerned liberal, pale pink in hue, likely to be clad in handspun and rarely in synthetic, with some ancient books and jewels and old frames with ancestors to add a touch of vintage and class.”

— English Heart, Hindi Heartland

For officers that had families larger flats were given and ones without families went to what is now known as the Ambassador Hotel. All of Sir Sobha Singh's descendants live in the colony today. Many famed personalities including Teji Bachchan, Khushwant Singh, K.P. Bhanumathi, Meenakshi Chettur, Capt. Amarinder Singh, Pushpindar Singh Chopra, Danial Latifi, Badruddin Tyabji, Reeta Devi and many others have lived in the Sujan Singh Park complex.

==== Development of Other Sites ====
He contracted the All India Fine Arts and Crafts Society Hall on Old Mill Road (Rafi Marg) on his own cost, Baroda House on Kasturba Gandhi Marg, Dyal Singh College in Delhi, the Government Medical College in Nagpur, designed by D.G. Karajgaonkar and the Bombay High Court, Nagpur Branch. Sobha Singh contracted the Central Research Institute in Kasauli too. Sir Sobha Singh was a founder-contractor of Chelmsford Club on Parliament Street. He also contracted the Broadcasting House (All India Radio) which remains one of the most iconic figures of radio television across Asia.

=== Bhakra-Nangal Dam Project ===
Bhakra Nangal Dam was designed by an American, Harvey Slocum and was executed by Sir Sobha Singh. When lack of funding from investors and the government had forced Harvey Slocum to almost abandon the project, Sir Sobha Singh arrived and funded it with his own money and with the help of Kamani Engineering, he also helped in engineer parts of the project where it was unfeasible, along with many other engineers. The Bhakra Nangal Dam was built over thirteen years (1949-1963) and Sir Sobha Singh steered the project through rough storms. The tiles that he had bought, if landed in a straight line, would be seven times the length of the Equator, it is the largest multipurpose river valley project in India and was the only dam in Asia which could produce 1500 MW of power- a beacon to India's new economic progress despite the setbacks and newly achieved freedom.

== Political and social career ==
He was appointed member of the Central Legislative Assembly in 1938 and Member of Council of States on 18 February 1939. He did not make many speeches, and was not an active participant in the colonial politics at the time. His father only spoke with a paper containing carefully worded speeches.

=== Sikh Religious Affairs ===
==== Gurdwara Reform Movement ====
Sir Sobha Singh's activities were questioned by the British after 1921, after he helped Sir Sundar Singh Majithia in his extremist demands against the British Raj. William Birdwood had clearly stated that the Sikh prisoners kept in Rasina Hill after the Jaito Morcha and Akali Movement should have been kept in custody. On 16 September 1921, Sir Sobha Singh defied the orders of the British, stating that they were innocent and non-violent, and the Sikhs who were charged with more severe terms (manslaughter, looting, theft) were still kept in Rasina Hill despite the Akali protest. Sir John Maynard agreed with Sir Sobha Singh and the Akalis, and allowed the prisoners to be free. Sir Sobha Singh was also made the honorary secretary of the Chief Khalsa Diwan like his father was.

He wrote a letter congratulating Sir Sunder Singh Majithia and wished his success in the Akali Movement, though Sir Sobha Singh was against Sikhs (or Indians) demanding independence from the British Raj.

==== Kirpan Morcha ====
Despite being a staunchly against communalism and divisive politics, Sardar Bahadur Sobha Singh did participate in the Kirpan Morcha by being part of a deputation of Sikhs, including Sardar Sant Singh, Sardar Bahadur Ranjit Singh, Sardar Bahadur Buta Singh and Rai Bahadur Baisakha Singh, to negotiate with civil authorities on the matter of all weapons being banned in Delhi, including the Sikh religious Kirpan. This was following an incident where the Delhi Police had cordoned a procession of Sikhs and trampled over two children. Sardar Sant Singh represented the delegation by giving a strong-worded speech in parliament against Mr. Killburn who was responsible; he was fired from his job and sent back to England.

==== Sikh Politics ====
He was a supporter of Sir Jogendra Singh politically, but did not mention any particular strand for electoral politics. One of Sobha Singh's famous speeches was about a Sikh Gurdwaras and Religious Endowments Bill, which led him to become the brainchild of the Delhi Sikh Gurdwara Management Committee. Most of his speeches were about Sikh rights, he also wished to create a separate Anand Marriage Act, but the British and Indian Nationalists both pressed him, hence he was on the Committee for the Hindu Law (Marriage) Bill. He also asked to increase the representation of Hindus in the Council of Sind, since Non-Muslims were not getting enough seats in the Sind province.

=== Bhagat Singh Court Case ===
The story of Sir Sobha Singh's involvement in the Bhagat Singh issue was that first Sobha Singh came late and arrived when the division bell rang on the Trade Disputes Bill. Some friends of his were seated near the Ladies' gallery and he looked towards them when the President announced the result of voting. He saw someone throwing something like a cigarette case in the Assembly Chamber, noticing smoke coming out and the members running away from their seats, after most people ran out of the assembly chamber and the visitors gallery- Sobha Singh looked down to see if his friend S.B. Jawahar Singh, who was sitting at the site of the explosion, was killed or not, but there were no casualties. Being a magistrate he called two police constables and followed them till a point. He heard revolver shots, an Anglo-Indian officer and another constable entered and arrested the accused, Sobha Singh was at the site of the arrest.

The testifiers included Sir Sobha Singh, Sargent H.D. Terry, Traffic Inspector C. Johnson, Sub-Inspector Chet Singh and Bhagat Singh himself all testified with the exact same story. Bhagat Singh was not charged on this case and Sobha Singh's testimony was valid, though there was no empirical evidence to charge either Bhagat Singh or B.K. Dutt.

==== Misconception of Sobha Singh's role ====
Bhagat Singh was hanged later, not for the bomb thrown in the Legislative Assembly, but for the murder of Saunders in Lahore, in which Sobha Singh had no role to play. It was years after Sir Sobha Singh's death in 1997 that public attention was drawn to the incident by an article titled, 'Khushwant Singh's Father was Main Witness in Bhagat Singh's Trial' by Malwinder Jit Singh Waraich of The Indian Express, which was erroneous and politically motivated in nature. The real people who testified against Bhagat Singh in the trial that led to his hanging were 6 members of Bhagat Singh's party, and landlord Ajaib Singh Kokri.

=== Great Bengal Famine ===
Sir Sobha Singh said in parliament that the Bengal famine of 1943 had exposed the constitutional defects inherent in the Government of India Act 1935. By becoming autonomous units, the provincial Governments had become self-sufficient and insular in their outlook, regardless of the good of the country. He was put at the helm of solving the Bengal famine along with Lord Wavell. While Lord Wavell had sent the army divisions and air force for relief work along the countryside, Sir Sobha Singh was tasked with improving railways and roads, which is why he was put on the Central Advisory Council for Railways, the Food Department for producing Bajra, Jowar, Millet, Rice and Wheat instead of Jute plantations in the East Bengal region, the Committee for Agriculture and Forests so that he could help in the food scarcity situation and provide wood which was lacking in areas like Odisha's coastal area. He was also put on the Committee for the Labour Department to solve the rampant unemployment which was occurring in the area at the time.

=== Interim Government of India ===
Govind Ballabh Pant had created a team of people for Evacuee Property transactions after the Partition of India, Dr. Zakir Husain, Sir Sobha Singh and Raghunandan Saran were all in the team to restore Muslim properties in Delhi and give them to the migrant populations, mainly from Sindh and from West Punjab. They were able to restore most of the properties but the population influx had changed the overall demographics, to such an extent that there were not enough houses for the Sikhs and Hindus who arrived. This led to new colonies springing in Delhi, which Sir Sobha Singh objected to, as they were badly planned, cramped, one-laned and many were lying on flood plains.

=== 1961 Delhi By-election ===
Chakravarti Rajagopalachari noted that Sir Sobha Singh was an enthusiast of the Swatantra Party in his letters to Mahatma Gandhi. He was given the position of chairman of the Delhi unit of the Swatantra Party in 1960, taking over from Sardar Bahadur Lal Singh in 1960. The manager (Hans Raj Pasricha) and Sir Sobha Singh did not get along well with each other, as the manager's ideology leaned to leftism, whereas Sir Sobha Singh's to the right. The Pasricha refused to comply with some orders, when the Delhi Swatantra Party Committee had decided that Manmohini Zutshi Sahgal should contest the New Delhi By-Election in 1961 as a Swatantra-supported independent candidate, it had gained major support till the manager and his aides did not comply with any orders and disrupted party meetings and rallies. Manmohini came fourth and the manager was blamed for the loss by Minoo Masani, though the manager could not officially receive the blame, Sir Sobha Singh resigned and the manager became the chairman. Though he was still part of the Swatantra Party, participating in the parties' Fourth National Convention.

== Business career ==
Sir Sobha Singh's businesses mostly came about after independence, he started working more on charities and business ventures. He was the Deputy President of the Associated Chambers of Commerce, Calcutta, one of the leading trade associations and advocacy groups. Due to his father and his work in cloth, mills and cotton spinning, he was made the Director of Delhi Cloth and General Mills. He was also a Director of Kamani Engineering Corporation Ltd as he represented them during the construction of the Bhakra-Nangal Dam. He was also a director of the Machinery Manufacturers Corporation of the Mahindra Group under Keshub Mahindra. His other business ventures were being chairman of Sterling General Insurance, Bharat Insurance, chairman of Ballarpur Industries, Bharat Carbon And Ribbon Mfg, House Owners' Association, Delhi & New Delhi, Central Mercantile Assurance Company, New India Industries Corporation, Delhi Safe Deposit and various other businesses.

=== Business in Bhopal ===
He was also Director of the Bank of Bhopal (later nationalized and merged with Bank of India) which was the primary bank in Bhopal established by Nawab Hamidullah Khan, a close friend of his. Sir Sobha Singh was heavily invested in Bhopal owning many properties. He worked from a bungalow called Aashiana near the Upper Lake, where his son Khushwant Singh wrote the famous story, Train to Pakistan. The Nawab invited him to set up industries in Bhopal State, for which he was given a 36-acre at a lease for 99 years, at Rs 1 near the old railway station. In the property was the Nerbudda Ice Factory under the Nerbudda Valley Refrigerated Products and an orchard which he received in the late 1940s, which provided ice to most of Central India.

=== Air India (Tata Group) ===
From 1951-1953, his main investments were directed at Air India (Tata Group) in Bombay, he quickly became the main investor at first, then the special director, then vice chairman and finally the chairman by 1952 within a span of two years. He had provided the airline business with the funding that it needed during the time. His business and administrative acumen had allowed for Air India to break through into their 'Golden Age' of service in the late 1950s through the 1970s."

=== Trade Agreements ===
Sobha Singh was the elected chairman of the Punjab Chamber of Commerce in 1939 and was part of the Commonwealth Relations Department and External Affairs Committee, the latter of which was housed at his property of the Scindia House Block in New Delhi.

== Charity Work and Philanthropy ==
Sardar Bahadur Sir Sobha Singh left a large part of his private estate to a charitable trust, the Sobha Singh Charitable Trust, which maintains homes and hospitals for the terminally ill and aged all over the country. He also presided over some institutions funded by it like the Deaf and Dumb School. He also became the head of the Central Public Works Department in Delhi. He donated heavily to the Tuberculosis Association of India and became a member of the Executive Committee of the Association from 1966 to 1972. He was a believer in the concept of Dasvandh (donating a tenth of ones earnings to charity), and gave lots of money to the poor, he became a known philanthropist in his last years. He worked with the Modern School as well, and was the main contractor along with the President of the Board of Trustees from 1930 to 1977. He was also the architect of the buildings. Since Sir Sobha Singh did not name anything after himself, an award was named after his wife in the school, the Lady Sobha Singh Trust Award and one after his oldest son who worked in the school, the Bhagwant Singh Award.

== Death ==
Sir Sobha Singh died at the age of 90 in Delhi on 18 April 1978. His son Khushwant Singh noted that he had died minutes after having his last sip of Scotch whisky.

== Personal life and family ==
Sir Sobha Singh was very Anglicized, with his son Khushwant noting, "he never wore Sherwanis or Chooridars, only two-piece suits, except the Tehmat he wore before sleeping." He was very hospitable, Sapru, Jayakar, Kunzru, Ayyangar, Devadoss, Nehru and Rajagopalachari all became very close to him and stayed at his grand house 'Vyukunth' in Delhi, "I often saw Mahatma Gandhi strolling in my father’s garden talking to Mr Jinnah" said Khushwant Singh. He was a gardener, and grew grapefruit, strawberries and roses. Sir Sobha Singh also spent lots of time in his Mashobra's 'Sunderban' house, which had apple and cherry trees, a cider press, a snow pit to chill beer, a billiard room, a dance hall with a grand piano and a tennis court, it originally housed the Consul for Mexico. He had four sons and a daughter:

1. Bhagwant Singh: Was heavily involved in Modern School and took care of his father's ancestral properties.
2. Daljit Singh: Freedom fighter and MLA from Safdar Jung constituency in 1951.
3. Khushwant Singh: Famous journalist, writer and politician in the Rajya Sabha. He received the Padma Bhushan (which he gave back in protest after Operation Blue Star), and later the Padma Vibhushan.
4. Mohinder Kaur: Married to Jaspal Singh Virk of Jandiala Guru.
5. Brigadier Gurbaksh Singh: Soldier who took part in the 1962 Sino-Indian War.

Sir Sobha Singh had no favorites among his four sons, though according to Khushwant Singh he was close to being one, but he had disappointed his father by not having the conventional success he hoped for. He noted that Sir Sobha Singh favored his daughter Mohinder Kaur more, stating that he gave her an "unencumbered estate bigger than the portions he gave his sons." He was very humble, and named no buildings after himself or his children, he named many after his father and one after his nephew, Narinder Singh, who he raised as his own. He was a proponent of arts and owned the first theatre in the new city- the Regal Theatre which he originally tried managing himself along with a restaurant named Standard, now Gaylord- he then bought another theatre called Rivvoli.

=== Urban Legends and Sayings ===
He was a part of what was nicknamed the Panj Pyare of Delhi (named after the Panj Pyare, the first 5 Khalsa Sikhs)- S.B. Sir Sobha Singh O.B.E., S.B. Basakha Singh Sandhu, S.B. Narain Singh of Akoi, S.B. Dharam Singh Sethi and Ram Singh Kabli.

Dhiren Bhagat and Salman Khurshid both noted a popular saying, that, "Ninety-nine per cent of India was owned by the Government and one per cent by Sir Sobha Singh."

"The only man expanding while contracting" was a popular joke at the time about his business.

He came to be described as "Adhi Dilli ka Malik" (the owner of half of Delhi) as he virtually owned a half of Lutyens' Delhi, before or during its construction.

== Legacy ==
In 2006, India International Centre (IIC) organized the first Sir Sobha Singh Memorial Lectures, in which the inaugural lecture titled, "My father, the builder", was given by his son, writer Khushwant Singh.

Sir Sobha Singh did not name any places after himself, although Prime Minister Manmohan Singh had stated that Windsor Place was to be renamed Sobha Singh Place although it did not happen. The Delhi Development Authority also planned to have a large park and colony near Sanjay Lake, Delhi named Sir Sobha Singh Park, though that did not happen either. Post-independence none of the contractors, architects or engineers of New Delhi were honored and no roundabouts, roads or monuments were named after any of them, Khushwant Singh stated, "it appeared like anti-Sikh communal prejudice."

According to Khushwant Singh, Sir Sobha Singh embarked his properties for charity in the form of the Sir Sobha Singh Charitable Trust, under Khushwant Singh and his younger brother Brigadier Gurbaksh Singh. These included the donation of a block to the Pingalwara in Amritsar (founded by Bhagat Puran Singh), assistance to Padma Shri Parveen Talha's Trust in her brother Osama's name in Lucknow, the Missionaries of Charity hospital, a block was given to Mrs Chona's Tamanna school for special children, a block in Bapsy Nariman's clinic, the Lahori Gate Polyclinic, and a hospital in rural Delhi to cater to the needs of a cluster of villages. Sir Sobha Singh's dream project was to have an accommodation near the Guru Tegh Bahadur Hospital for families of patients, who usually came from far away places and just hung around the staircase without proper facilities, though he asked the government multiple times to construct the site, they did not accept. It was only on 5 March 2005 (Sir Sobha Singh's birth anniversary) that they managed to build a block of flats (called the Sir Sobha Singh Dharamshala) next to Guru Tegh Bahadur Hospital to accommodate families of patients.

=== List of Sites Personally Contracted ===
Sites named after him include:

1. Sir Sobha Singh Block (1979)
2. Sir Sobha Singh Dharamshala (2005)

These do not include private homes, clerks quarters and chummeries, of which innumerable were built.

1. Kalka-Simla Railroad (1903)
2. Vijay Chowk (1910)
3. Kerala State Government Guest House (1911)
4. Jaipur Column (1911)
5. Raisina Hill (1912)
6. Alipur Road (1913)
7. Khalsa Cotton Spinning and Weaving Mills (1918)
8. Red Cross Buildings (1920)
9. Modern School, Barakhamba (1920)
10. Roshanara Club (1922)
11. Secretariat Building, North Block (1927)
12. Chelmsford Club (1928)
13. All India Fine Arts and Crafts Society Hall (1928)
14. Regal Building (1928)
15. Rashtrapati Bhavan (1929)
16. Secretariat Building, South Block (1929)
17. Safdarjung Airport Aerodrome (1929)
18. Sujan Singh Block A (1930)
19. India Gate (1931)
20. Sujan Singh Block B (1932)
21. Cricket Club of India (1933)
22. Sujan Singh Block C (1933)
23. Central Research Institute (1935)
24. American Express Block (1935)
25. Baroda House (1936)
26. All India Radio Broadcasting House (1936)
27. Scindia House Block (1936)
28. Bombay High Court, Nagpur Branch (1936)
29. Nerbudda Valley Factory (1937)
30. The Union Academy (1939)
31. Rivoli Cinema (1940)
32. Aashiana (1940)
33. St. Columbus School (1941)
34. Sujan Singh Park (1945)
35. Ambassador Hotel (1945)
36. Government Medical College (1947)
37. Dera Gurudwara (1949)
38. National Museum (1949)
39. Dyal Singh College (1952)
40. Tuberculosis Hospital (1952)
41. Tilaiya Dam (1953)
42. Narinder Place (1954)
43. Konar Dam (1955)
44. Deaf and Dumb School (1956)
45. Maithon Dam (1957)
46. Panchet Dam (1958)
47. Raghubir Singh Junior Modern School (1961)
48. Bhakra-Nangal Dam (1963)
49. Modern School, Vasant Vihar (1975)
