= With Malice towards One and All =

"With Malice towards One and All" was the weekly column series published by Indian author and journalist Khushwant Singh in the leading English language dailes of India, occupying two full length columns on the editorial page of the Saturday edition.

== Syndication ==
His articles appear in The Telegraph, Hindustan Times and then The Pioneer, with syndication by multiple publications.

== Irreverent wit ==
The write-up included combination of 3-4 essays, starting usually with commentary on current political, popular culture, literature and socio-economic events. Out of these, one of the essays used to include memoirs of extensive travels by Khushwant Singh, particularly during his extended stays in the UK & Europe.

== Column punchline ==
His comparisons of social and behavioural characteristics of westerners and Indians, laced with his inimitable wit, was the punchline of this popular series. A short snippet or contributory joke sent in by the readers was usually the last passage of the column.

== Mario cartoon ==
The accompanying Mario cartoon he used on his column first appeared in the “Editor’s Page” of The Illustrated Weekly of India. It depicted a caricature of himself, sitting next to a pile of books, a bottle of scotch, and a girlie magazine.
