= Travancore House =

Building in New Delhi

Coordinates: 28.619494°N 77.228112°E

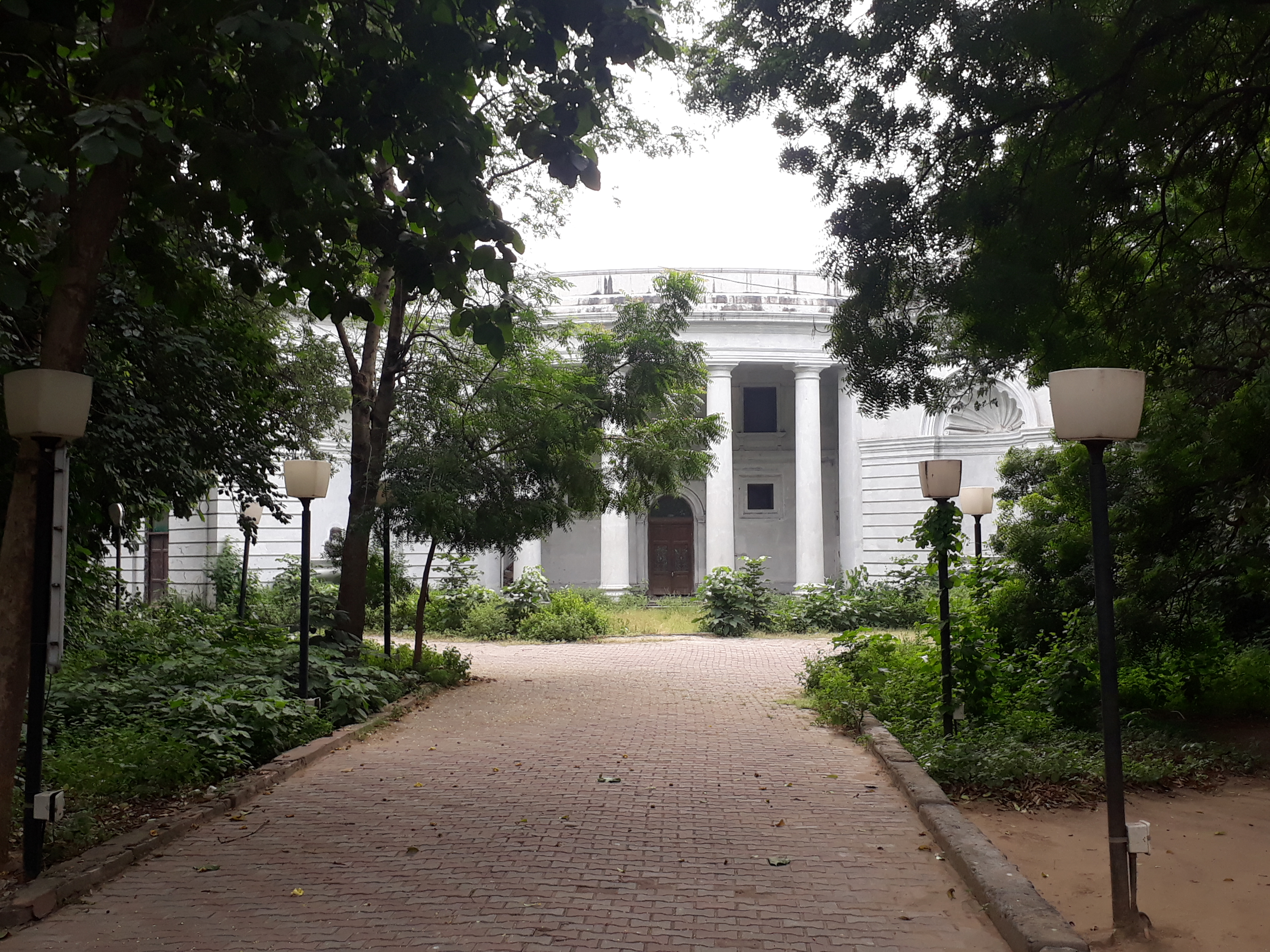

General information
- Construction started: 1903
- Completed: 1911; 115 years ago
- Cost: ₹2.5 crore
- Owner: Government of Kerala
- Operator: Government of Kerala

Technical details
- Floor area: 1,000 m^{2} (11,000 sq ft)
- Lifts/elevators: 5

Other information
- Number of rooms: 66

Website
- www.gokdelhi.kerala.gov.in

Travancore House, also known as Travancore Palace, is the former residence of the Maharaja of Travancore in New Delhi. It is located on Kasturba Gandhi Marg.

== History ==
It was constructed in 1930. The architectural layout is a simple butterfly bungalow, which was unusual for the larger princely residences in New Delhi.

The building has been categorised as a heritage building by the New Delhi Municipal Council. The effort of the government of Kerala is to transform this heritage building into a cultural complex. As part of this plan, an art gallery has been set up in the Travancore House. It is run under the auspices of Kerala House, which has a number of offices there.

== See also ==
- Cochin House
