= Karma (short story) =

Short story by Khushwant Singh

"Karma" is a short story written by Indian writer Khushwant Singh. It was originally published in 1989 in Singh's The Collected Stories.

"Karma" is about an Oxford-educated Indian man who adopts upper-class English culture and lifestyle only to be rejected by British colonial officers.

== Plot ==
Mohan Lal is a middle-aged Indian man living in India during the British Raj. He admires British culture, having studied in Britain for five years, and he has adopted British diet (including drinking scotch), clothing (wearing Balliol ties), and leisure activities (solving the crossword). He is preparing to board the first-class compartment of a train, and he hopes to impress the British officials he may encounter. His wife, Lachmi, by contrast, describes herself as a traditional woman, and she is perceived negatively by Mohan Lal. Lachmi, having spent her time in the waiting area eating traditional food, preparing her betel leaf, and conversing with a porter, is traveling in the general women's compartment.

When Mohan and Lachmi board, the British officials violently kick him off of the train. Lachmi begins a pleasant voyage.

== Themes ==
The title of the story comes from an Indian concept, karma, which is about the consequences of actions in a system of free will. This may be reflective of the consequences of Mohan Lal's lack of self-awareness with regards to his education, or it may be about his treatment of his wife.

The story also portrays the proverb "Pride comes before a fall."

== Narration ==
The story is narrated from the third-person omniscient point of view, and the narration switches between the parallel journeys of Mohan and Lachmi.

== Characters ==
- Mohan Lal: an arrogant middle-aged man
- Lachmi: a pleasant, middle-aged woman; the wife of Mohan Lal
- bearer: a man that brings Mohan Lal's drink and installs his luggage in the first-class coupe.
- porter: a man that speaks with Lachmi and carries her luggage onto the train
- Bill and Jim: British soldiers that remove Mohan Lal from the train for boarding the reserved first-class compartment
