= Hadali =

Town in the District of Khushab, Punjab, Pakistan

- Location in Pakistan
- Coordinates: 32°17′32″N 72°11′32″E
- Country: Pakistan
- Province: Punjab
- Elevation: 188 m (617 ft)

Population (2017)
  - Total: 53,669

Hadali (Punjabi: ہڈالی) is a town located in Khushab District in the Punjab Province of Pakistan. The town is administratively subdivided into two Union Councils, including Hadali-Ii.

== History ==
Khushab District was a forested agricultural region during the Indus Valley Civilization. The Vedic period was characterized by Indo-Aryan culture. The Kambojas, Daradas, Kaikayas, Madras, Pauravas, Yaudheyas, Malavas, and Kurus, ruled the ancient Punjab region.

After overrunning the Achaemenid Empire in 331 BCE, Alexander the Great marched into the Punjab region with an army of 50,000. The Khushab region was ruled by Maurya Empire, Indo-Greek kingdom, Kushan Empire, Gupta Empire, White Huns, Kushano-Hephthalites and the Turk and Hindu Shahi kingdoms.

In 997 CE, Sultan Mahmud Ghaznavi took over the Ghaznavid dynasty empire established by his father, Sultan Sebuktegin. In 1005, he conquered the Shahis in Kabul, and followed it by the conquests of the Punjab region. The Delhi Sultanate and, later, the Mughal Empire ruled the region. The Punjab region became predominantly Muslim due to missionary Sufi saints whose dargahs dot the landscape.

After the decline of the Mughal Empire, the Sikh Empire invaded and occupied the Khushab District. During the period of British rule, Khushab district increased in population and importance.

The predominantly Muslim population of Khushab District supported the All-India Muslim League and the Pakistan Movement. After independence in 1947, the minority Hindus and Sikhs largely migrated to India while some of the Muslim refugees flocking to Pakistan from India settled in Hadali.

== Economy ==
Hadali's main source of income is agriculture. The main crops cultivated in Hadali are sugarcane, wheat and rice.

Cattle-farming also contributes to the economy in Hadali.

== Notable people ==
- Sardar Bahadur Mehtab Singh, politician and freedom fighter
- Sardar Bahadur Sir Sobha Singh, contractor, real-estate developer and politician who once owned around half of Lutyens' Delhi
- Governor Ujjal Singh, a freedom fighter, politician and Governor of Punjab (India) and Tamil Nadu
- Khushwant Singh, renowned journalist and politician, who wrote multiple books, including Train to Pakistan
- Brigadier Gurbux Singh, soldier, served during the Annexation of Goa and 1962 Sino-Indian War
- Nilofar Bakhtiar, former NCSW Chairperson, former Federal Minister of Tourism
