= Daljit Singh (Delhi politician) =

Indian politician

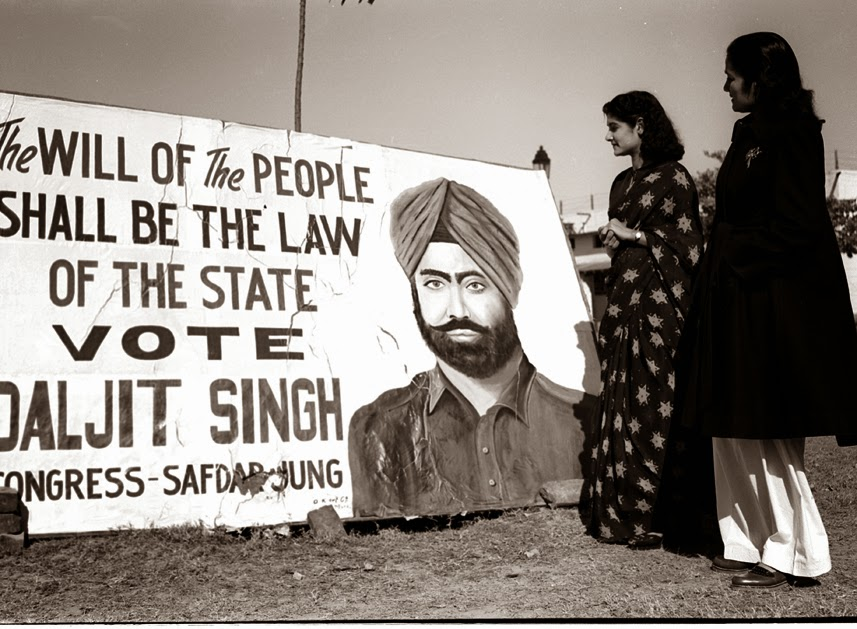

Member of Parliament
- In office 27 March 1952 – 1 November 1956

Member of the Legislative Assembly, Delhi
- Constituency: Safdar Jang constituency

Commander of National Volunteer Corps

Personal details
- Born: 10 October 1922 New Delhi, British India
- Party: Indian National Congress
- Parent(s): Sir Sobha Singh and Lady Sobha Singh (Varyam Kaur)

Daljit Singh was an Indian politician and freedom fighter who served in the Delhi Legislative Assembly following the 1951 election. He also played a large role in the Indian Independence Movement, while the movement was underground, during the Second World War.

== Early life and family ==
Singh lived on Queensway in New Delhi. He was the son of Sir Sobha Singh and youngest brother of Khushwant Singh. His ex-wife, Dip Singh was married to journalist, Charles Wheeler and were the parents of barrister Marina Wheeler, famously known as the ex-wife of former prime minister of the United Kingdom, Boris Johnson. Daljit Singh went to the Modern School. In the latter years of his life Singh shifted his residence to Ashram, Delhi.

== Pre-Partition ==
=== Indian Independence Movement ===
According to reports many pro-government contractors helped Aruna Asaf Ali during her struggle against the British Government. He had secret talks with Aruna Asaf Ali twice in Dutt's house and then went to Scindia House afterwards both times. Reports stated that he had provided great assistance to the Indian National Congress and sheltered Congress absconders and extremists including Aruna Asaf Ali in Karol Bagh and Scindia House, his fathers properties.

He applied to be in the British Indian Army to win over the soldiers and start a mutiny on command of the Congress' Underground Movement, although was turned down by the British Government. From 1942 to 1945 he sheltered Aruna Asaf Ali, his older brother, a famous journalist, Khushwant Singh had noted that Mrs Asaf Ali came to their house in a Burqa one night and asked for a duplicator- Khushwant Singh had replied that the fight against Fascism was more important than the British at the time, but he mentioned the incident to Daljit Singh who bought one not realizing the name of the buyer had to be recorded on the duplicator. In a police raid on Aruna Asaf Ali's hideout they traced the duplicator back to Daljit Singh, who was arrested. His father Sobha Singh was expecting a knighthood that year and was aghast; he immediately went to see the Commissioner of Delhi, Sir Evan Jenkins. Sobha Singh did end up receiving a knighthood and Daljit Singh was released after a while.

=== National Volunteer Corps ===
After the Partition of India he had organized the National Volunteer Corps in Delhi to help rehabilitate refugees, Hindus, Muslims and Sikhs either refugees or attacked during violence. He was noted to be the commander of the National Volunteer Corps till the 1960s.

== Post-Partition ==
=== Election of 1951 ===
Daljit Singh stood as the Indian National Congress candidate in the Safdar Jang constituency. He won the seat, having obtained a landslide victory of 5,870 votes (81.21% of the votes in the constituency). The Indian National Congress refused him tickets afterwards.

=== Post-political Life ===
Afterwards he became the director of the United Press of India. He had built up the Tonga-Rehra Union in Delhi with a membership of 10,000 people. He also courted arrest in a union's agitation for de-rationing gram. He took an active part in St. John Ambulance activities and was Corps Superintendent New Delhi Division, he promoted social work and education among the masses.
