= Walter Sykes George =

Anglo-Indian architect

- Born: 1881; Ashton-under-Lyne, Lancashire, England
- Died: 7 January 1962 (aged 80–81); Delhi, India
- Education: Royal College of Art
- Occupation: Architect

Sir Walter Sykes George C.B.E. (1881 – 7 January 1962) was an English architect active in India during the first half of the 20th century, most known for being part of the team of architects who designed New Delhi, the new capital of India, from 1911-1931.

== Early life and education ==
George's family were Wesleyan Methodists. He was born at Canterbury Street, Ashton-under-Lyne, in 1881, the second of seven children. His father, William Henry George, was a builder's clerk who later became an architect and auctioneer and founded a family architectural practice with his children Walter, Helen and Henry. He joined the School of Art in Ashton-under-Lyne to study architecture in 1894 and the School of Art in Manchester in 1899 where he continued his studies, receiving a Royal Exhibition in Art in 1901. Later, he studied under A. Beresford Pite and W. R. Lethaby at the Royal College of Art, London.

== Early career ==
He practiced in London from 1901 and was awarded the Soane Medallion by the Royal Institute of British Architects in 1906. From 1906 to 1915 he worked with the British School at Athens and joined several excavations in Macedonia and Constantinople researching Byzantine monuments. He undertook extensive drawings of the Hagios Demetrios in Thessaloniki which became invaluable as the only extant drawings of the church when it burned down in the Great Thessaloniki Fire of 1917. His documentation of the Hagia Eirene resulted in the 1913 monograph, The Church of St Eirene at Constantinople.

== In India ==
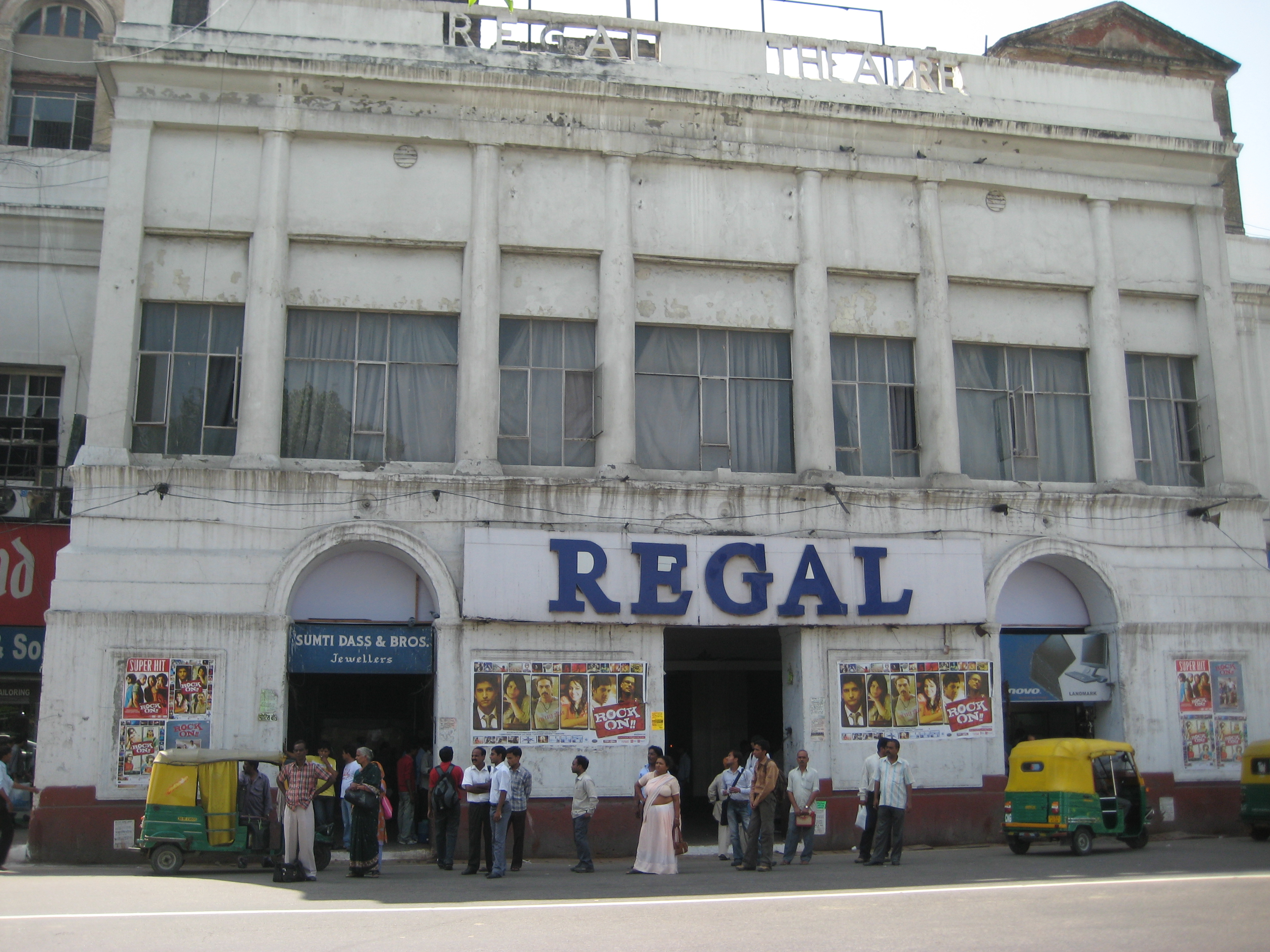
Regal Theatre, New Delhi

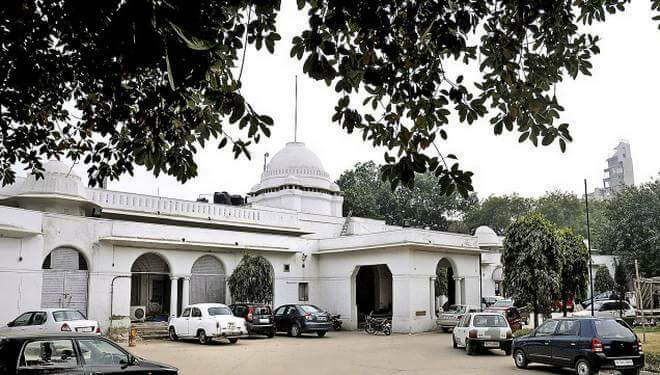
Bahawalpur House

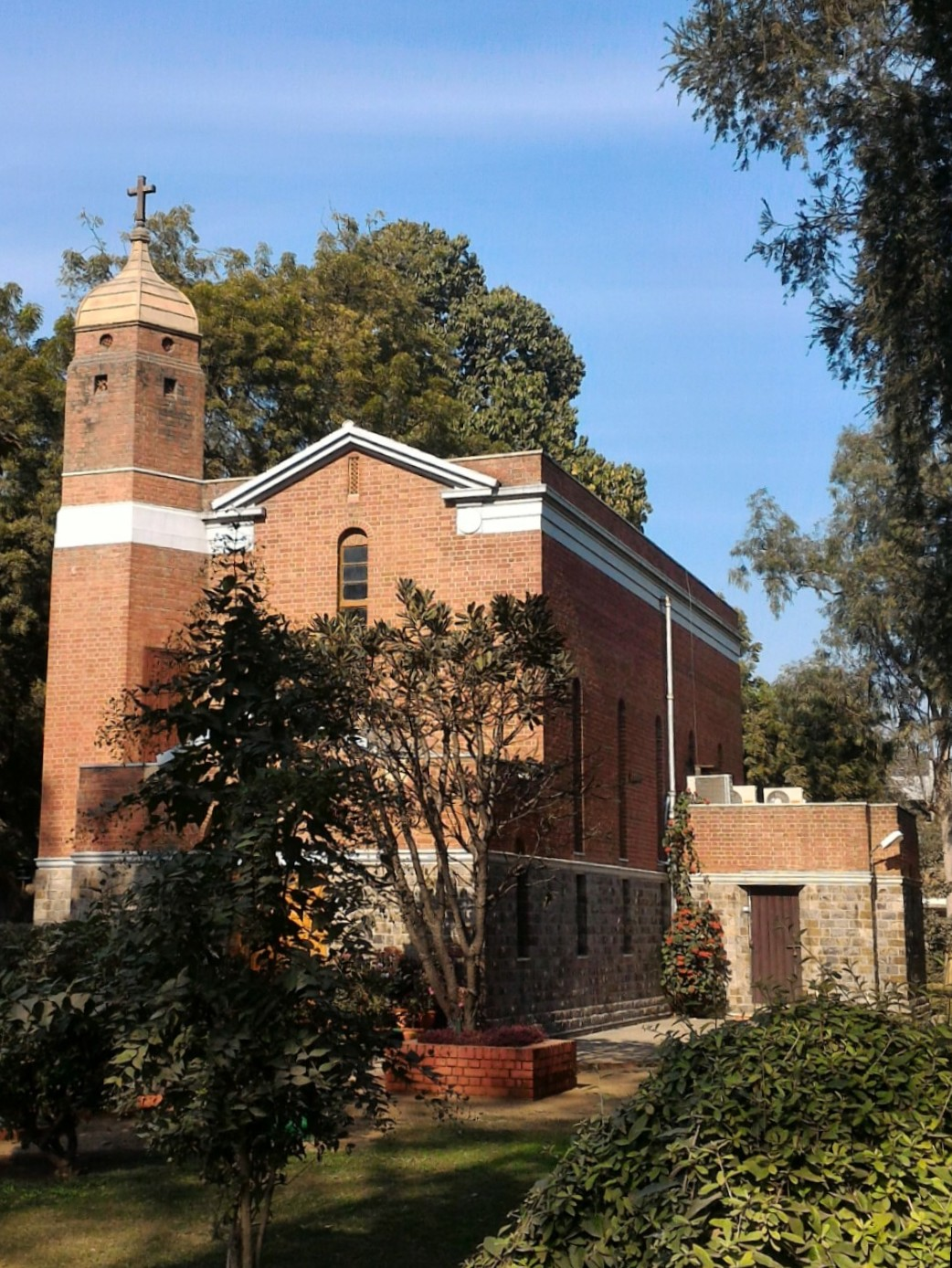
St. Stephen's College Chapel

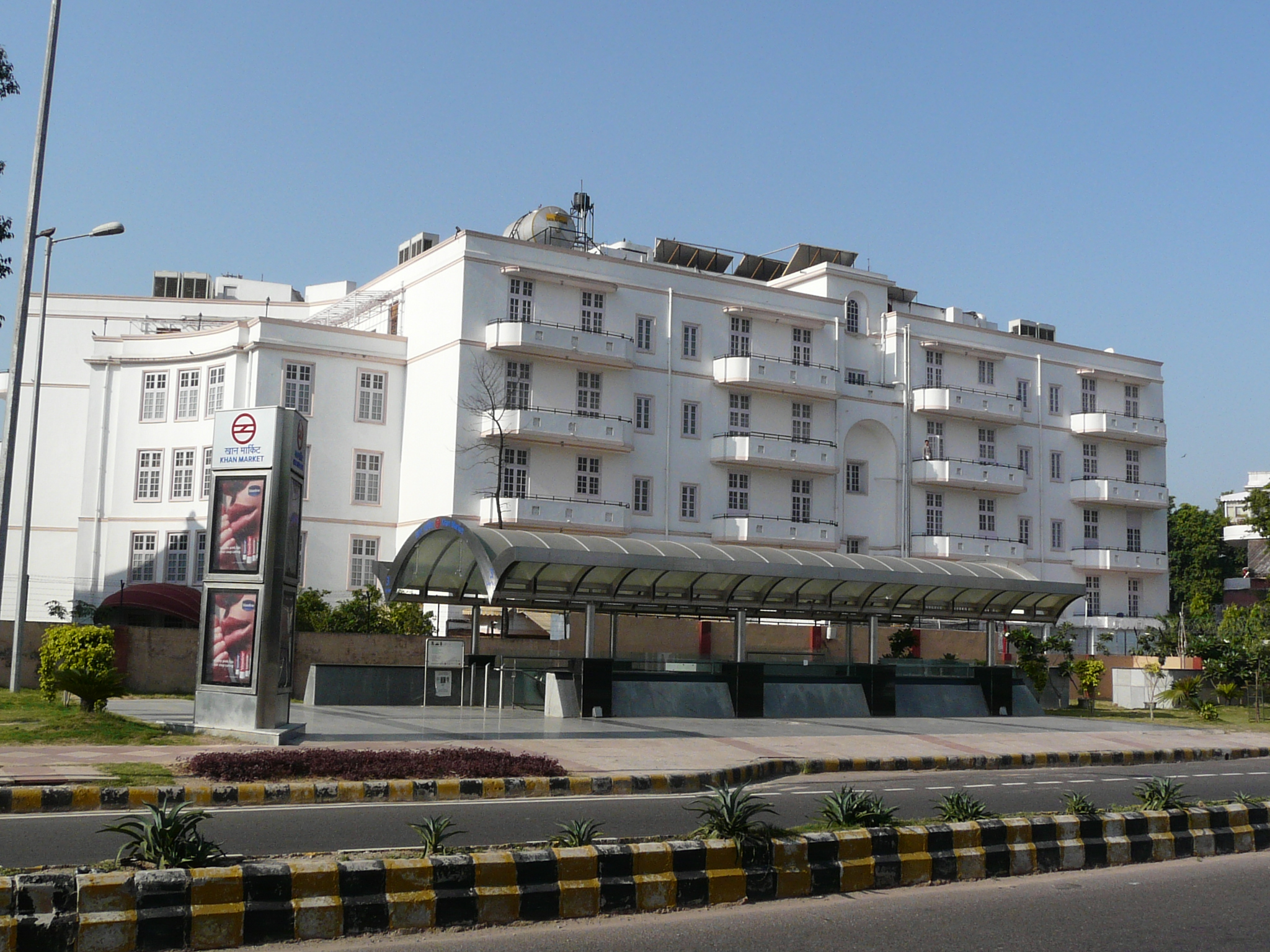
The Ambassador Hotel as seen from the Khan Market Metro Station

George moved to India in 1915 in order to work with Herbert Baker on the proposed new city of New Delhi. He served as a trooper in the Punjab Light Horse of the Indian Defence Force while working on the Imperial Delhi Secretariat. In 1923 he began to practice privately. George along with William Robert Mustoe, the Director of Horticulture, landscaped and planted the Mughal Gardens of the Viceroy's House. George also designed several bungalows in the Lutyens Bungalow Zone. The Council Chamber in Shimla that now houses the Legislative Assembly of Himachal Pradesh was designed by him and inaugurated by the Viceroy, Lord Reading in 1925. It has been described as "the only decent building in Simla" and one that "did much to redeem the PWD's work" in the summer capital of the British Raj in India. George also undertook projects for several princely states building the Jind, Mandi, Bahawalpur and Kashmir Houses in Delhi. Of these, the Kashmir House was designed along with Edwin Lutyens and was completed in 1929. In both Mandi House, completed in 1933. and Bahawalpur House, completed in 1939, George reproduced the Buddhist dome found on the Viceroy's House and featured Italianate loggias and columns. The Lady Irwin College, inaugurated in 1932, was also designed by him. A single storeyed building along a rectangular plan, with vaulted ceilings in the corridors, it is built of exposed brick and has a semi-circular arched gateway entrance and a rectangular tower over its central porch. The St. Thomas Church at Paharganj was built in 1933 for Indian converts to Christianity. A brick structure plinthed on a base of Delhi quartzite stone, the building does not use steel or reinforced concrete but lime mortar. The buttresses to the building were added subsequently in 1943. A 61 feet tall tower accessed through a winding staircase tops the church which has a vaulted arch roof and is entered through a Roman style entrance portal. The building has however required substantial remedial measures in subsequent decades as it used no steel or concrete in its construction and was unwittingly founded atop a graveyard, the collapse of which led to damage to the structure. Work on St. Stephen's College began in 1939 and was completed in 1941. The College and its residential blocks have a composite design in which the main building links to the residential buildings with open courts and lawns between them. The buildings are of unadorned red brick with a stone base of Delhi quartzite. The roofline is interspersed with chhatris whereas the colonnades and broad verandas are adaptations made for Delhi's climate. The central tower of the building resembles that of the Cambridge University Library built by George Gilbert Scott. George also designed the College Chapel built in 1952. In 1942, George and his associates established the Department of Architecture as part of the Delhi Polytechnic in Kashmere Gate. It was the first school for architects to be established in North India. The residential neighbourhood of Lodhi Colony was another major project completed in the 1940s by George. Meant to house government employees, the colony is renowned for its pedestrian friendly design with ample open spaces and broad sidewalks. Each apartment complex is walled off and has large repetitive arches in them leading to the residential quarters. Its unique design with the large walls and arches made it popular with street artists and was inaugurated as the first art district of India.

He was known as Sir Sobha Singh's architect due to their collaboration on many projects. The Scindia House on Connaught Circus which was designed for the Maharaja of Gwalior today houses several tour operators' offices, it was Sobha Singh's property. In 1932 the Regal Cinema, designed by George and built by Sir Sobha Singh on Connaught Place, opened and was Delhi's first cinema hall. A three-storeyed building modelled in the manner of a Palladian villa, it fuses Georgian and Mughal architectural features and has an overall concrete finish with its name cut out of the cornice. Sujan Singh Park (named after Sobha Singh's father, Sujan Singh Hadaliwale), the first residential apartment complex in New Delhi, was built during 1939-45. Designed in the neoclassical style it is noted for its "semi-circular arches and high Mughal inspired-archways, Art Deco facades and exposed brick masonry". The complex consists of seven four-storeyed apartment blocks housing eighty-four individual one- and two-bedroom apartments with each block surrounding a park - a design that deeply influenced the later work of Habib Rahman and became the model for several housing projects in Delhi undertaken by the Delhi Development Authority. Dormitories built to accommodate construction workers building the complex were subsequently converted into one room units and form a sprawling servants' quarters spread across 12 blocks and house thrice as many people as the apartment complex itself. The nearby Ambassador Hotel, now a part of the Taj group of hotels, built in 1945 was designed by George and was meant to house British officers serving in India without their families and who could therefore share common living rooms and kitchens. This landmark building has elements of colonial and Art Deco styles of architecture and is one of the earliest hotels to be established in New Delhi. He also designed Sir Sobha Singh (and later Khushwant Singh's) house in Janpath named Vyukunt, it is a double-storied complex with two chimneys and an outer curve resembling Sujan Singh Park's main entrance, and may be called a stand-alone version of the same.

=== In Independent India ===
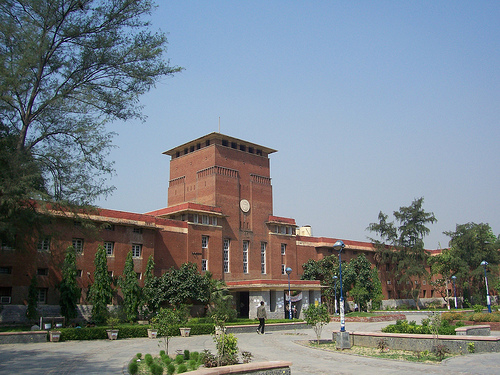
Arts Faculty building, Delhi University

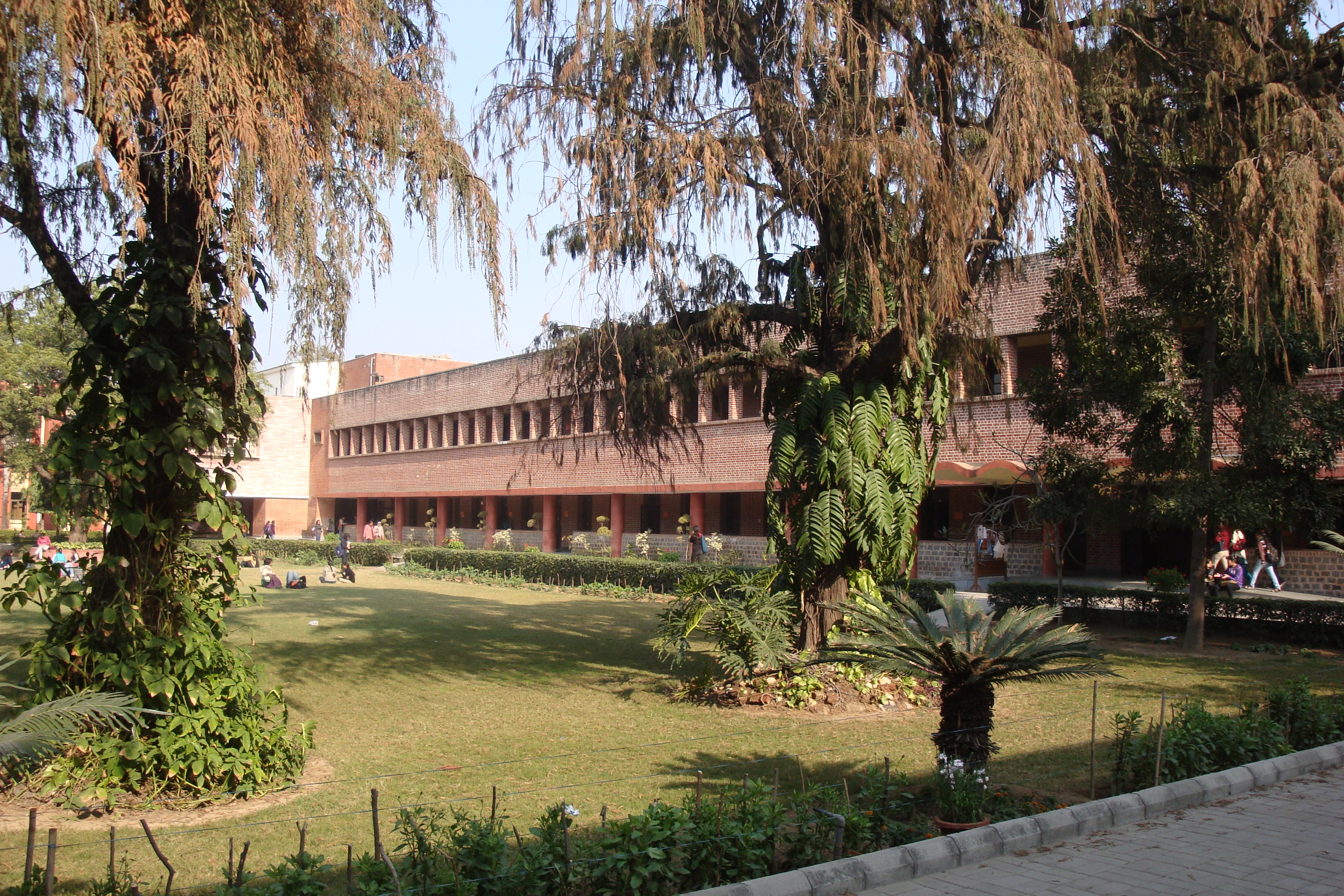
Miranda House College

After India's independence, George was the only architect of the group that had worked with Edwin Lutyens and Herbert Baker towards establishing New Delhi who chose to stay back in the country. In 1948, Miranda House was founded as a residential women's college of the Delhi University as was the Arts Faculty Building of the Delhi University, both designed by George, and the foundation stones for both of which were laid on the same day by Lord Mountbatten. He was founding member of the Institute of Town Planners, India and twice served as the president of the Indian Institute of Architects. The Tuberculosis Association Building, completed in 1952, marked an evolution in George's architectural practice. Its use of adjustable light-weight horizontal sun-breakers in place of the arched and colonnaded verandas of his earlier buildings represents the adaptation of the International Style of architecture whereas the materials used draw from the Anglo-Indian architecture of the preceding decades.

George was made a Knight Commander of the Order of the British Empire in the Birthday Honours of 1960.

Walter Sykes George died in Delhi on 7 January 1962.

== Style and legacy ==
Walter George's work marked Indian architecture's move towards modernism. George himself maintained that his architectural style represented nothing but "pure form, as dictated by the material". His buildings with their use of exposed red bricks were innovative and a shift away from the pink sandstone used extensively in Lutyens' Delhi and was low-cost in comparison to the buildings of Lutyens and Baker.
