= Nilofar Bakhtiar =

Pakistani politician

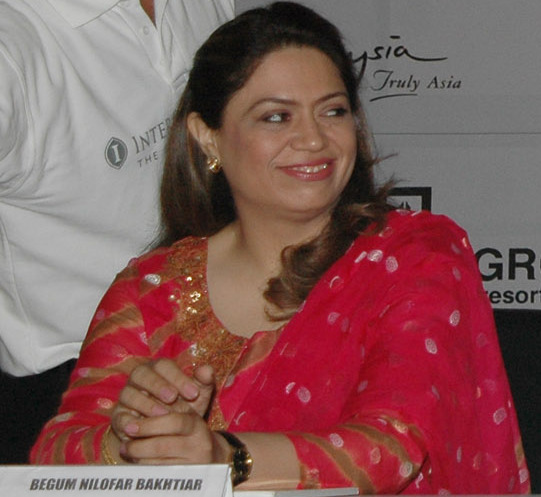

Federal Minister for Tourism
- In office 28 August 2004 – 21 May 2007
- President: Pervez Musharaff
- Prime Minister: Shaukat Aziz

Senator of Pakistan
- In office March 2006 – March 2012

Personal details
- Born: 9 September 1957 (age 68) Hadali, Punjab, Pakistan
- Party: Pakistan Tehreek-e-Insaf (since 2018)
- Other party: PML-Q (till 2018)
- Children: 3
- Education: Presentation Convent Girls High School
- Alma mater: Punjab University; Heinz College at Carnegie Mellon University

Nilofar Bakhtiar (Urdu: نیلوفر بختیار) (born 9 September 1957) is a public official in Pakistan. She was Federal Minister for Tourism in Prime Minister Shaukat Aziz's cabinet until a scandal forced her to resign. She remains a senator. Bakhtiar has worked toward improving women's social status, as well as working in areas of health and education.

== Early life and education ==
Bakhtiar was born in Hadali to a Punjabi Muslim family. The family has a background of social work and military service. Her father was retired from army as colonel while her two brothers retired from brigadier rank. Begum Ali Malik, Bakhtiar's mother, was a renowned social worker and was also the founder and chairperson of The National Committee for the Repatriation of POWs after the 1971 war.

For high school Bakhtiar attended Presentation Convent Girls High School in Rawalpindi. She received a Bachelor of Arts from the Punjab University and a Masters in Public Administration from the Heinz College at Carnegie Mellon University.

== Career ==
Bakhtiar was elected to serve a two-year term as a director of The International Association of Lions Clubs at the association’s 82nd International Convention, held in San Diego, California, US, 28 June – 2 July 1999. In addition, she serves as chairman of the Prevention of Diabetic Blindness Center and has pioneered the creation of several Lions schools and a school for mentally handicapped children. She is also a Melvin Jones Fellow. Nilofer Bakhtiar is a hotel administrator.

=== Political career ===
She joined Pakistan Muslim League in 1990. She headed PML election campaigns in 1990, 1993, and 1997. Other organizations she heads or is a member of include: President of the Women's Wing of the Pakistan Muslim League in Rawalpindi, a member of the Central Working Committee since 1996. During Tehrik-e-Nijat, a government operation against anti-government protests, she was imprisoned. She serves on the board of numerous educational and civic bodies. Bakhtiar has served in the Senate of Pakistan from March 2006 to March 2018. She later joined Pakistan Tehreek-e-Insaf in 2018.

== Family ==
Married to Ahmad Bakhtiar, has two sons and one daughter.

== Parachuting controversy ==
In April 2007, Islamic clerics in Pakistan issued a fatwa urging that she be punished and fired from the government after some newspapers printed photographs of her hugging her parachuting instructor, a man, after landing from a charity parachute jump in France. The clerics stated that this was "an illegitimate and forbidden act, and that without any doubt, she has committed a great sin."

Bakhtiar described the hug as a congratulatory pat after her parachute jump. "It was just a pat because he felt so proud of me, I did it for a good cause. I did not have any practice of parajumping. I thought it was brave on my part." The jump had been intended to raise money for victims of the 2005 Kashmir earthquake.

On 21 May 2007, according to some sources Nilofar Bakhtiar announced her resignation as Tourism Minister, over the parachute controversy. Pakistani Prime Minister Shaukat Aziz rejected this resignation but Bakhtiar insisted and quit. She planned to sue the clerics behind the fatwa.

Ms Bakhtiar complained of a campaign of intimidation against her, and had told a Senate Standing Committee that her life was under threat. Ms Bakhtiar said she was disappointed by her Cabinet colleagues who had failed to stand by her.

== See also ==
- Pakistan Muslim League Q
