= Truth, Love & a Little Malice =

Autobiography of Khushwant Singh

- Author: Khushwant Singh
- Genre: Autobiography
- Publisher: Viking
- Publication date: 2002
- Publication place: India
- Pages: 423
- ISBN: 0-670-04916-6

Truth, Love and a Little Malice (published in 2002) is the title of the autobiography of Khushwant Singh, a famous Indian writer, journalist and columnist who is also a qualified Barrister from the King's College, London. Apart from tracing his story and immediate family history, it deals in-depth with his relations with political dignitaries. The name of the book itself was derived from a famous column that he wrote for the newspaper Hindustan Times (and that was syndicated in several newspapers) with the title "With malice towards one and all."

Some exclusive excerpts of the book detailing the relationship between the ex-Prime minister Indira Gandhi and her daughter-in-law Maneka Gandhi were published in India Today to generate publicity before publication of the book. The publication of the book was held up for more than five years after Maneka Gandhi filed a case against the release of the book.
