= The Company of Women (Singh novel) =

1999 novel by Khushwant Singh

- Author: Khushwant Singh
- Language: English
- Series: 1
- Genre: Novel
- Publisher: Viking Press
- Publication date: 1999
- Publication place: India
- Media type: Print (hardback & paperback)
- Pages: 294 pp (first edition, hardcover)
- ISBN: 0-670-88991-1 (first edition, hardcover)
- OCLC: 42955105
- Dewey Decimal: 823/.914 21
- LC Class: PR9499.3.K48 C66 1999

The Company of Women is a novel by Indian author Khushwant Singh about a divorced man's extensive sexual exploits. The novel also addresses themes of globalization and the hedonistic lifestyles of the newly wealthy upper-middle class.

== Background ==
Singh wrote The Company of Women at age 84, drawing inspiration from his father's series of love affairs after divorcing his mother. Singh described the resulting book, which was sexually explicit, as "fantasies of an octogenarian." The graphic sex scenes were often remarked upon in the press and by readers; one lawyer in Chennai filed a complaint about what he called its "obscene" content.

== Plot summary ==
Mohan Kumar is an Indian student. He wins a scholarship to Princeton University in the United States, where he soon develops a reputation for having an unusually large penis. He loses his virginity to Jessica Brown, a beautiful black woman, and sleeps with dozens of other people.

Mohan later returns to India, becomes wealthy, and settles into married life. But his passion for women continues undiminished, despite his marriage to a "nagging and ill-tempered" wife. He is unfaithful during his marriage, and once they separate, he places a classified ad, offering to pay women to sleep with him.

His sexual exploits from then on are unusual and varied. His partners include his ever-obliging maid, Dhanno, and Tamilian Marry Joseph, "a dark, plump woman in her thirties" who is a nurse to Kumar's son. Joseph propositions Shakti Kumar with the words, "Saar, one life to live, not to waste it on a drunkard husband. You agree?"; he agrees. Mohan's other partners include Sarojini Bhardwaj, a professor of English; Molly Gomes, a masseuse from Goa who was "not only as an incarnation of sensual impulse, but also as a mistress of sexuality"; and Susanthika Goonatilleke, Sri Lankan diplomat.

== Critical reception ==
The novel received mixed reviews, as some critics found its sexual content frivolous compared to Singh's scholarly career. The Hindu wrote that "it is hard to associate it with the author of such serious works as Train to Pakistan and the scholarly history of Sikhs." India Today called the book a "rollicking sexual romp" with a surprising ending.

After Singh's death, The Guardian wrote that The Company of Women was among the "landmarks in Indo-English fiction."
