= Kerala House =

Coordinates: 28.62°N 77.21°E

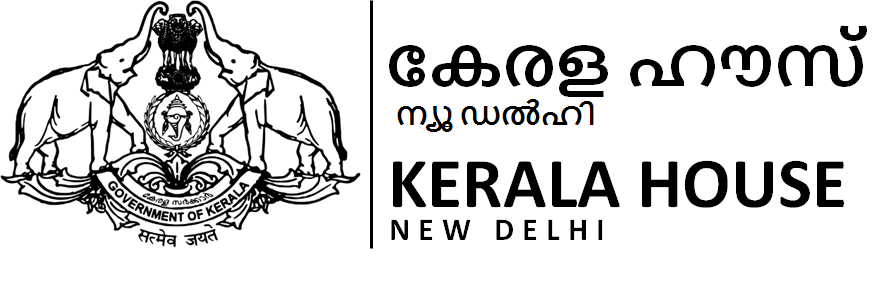

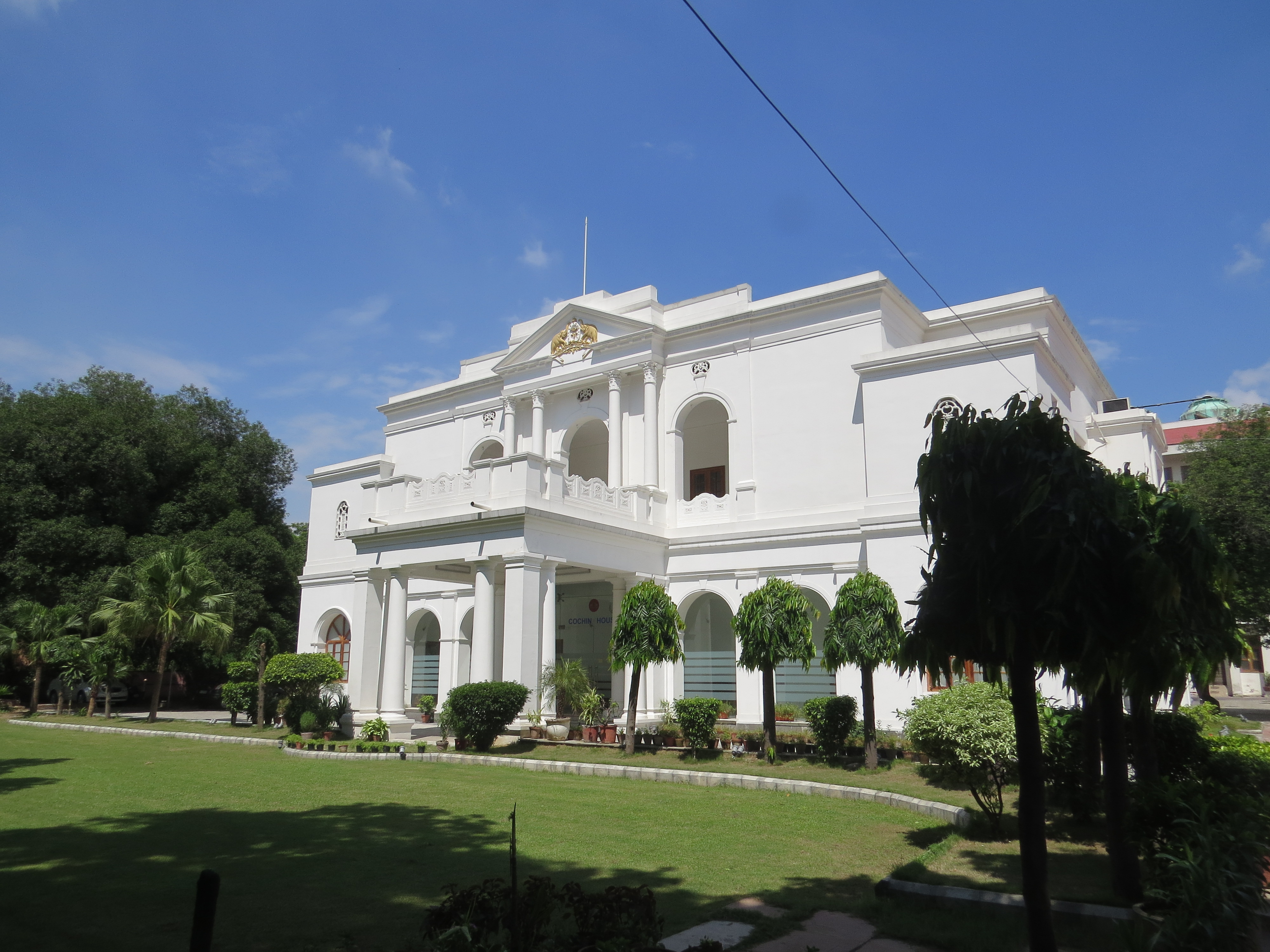
- Cochin House, the main building of the Kerala House complex
- Interactive map of the Kerala House area

General information
- Construction started: 1903; 123 years ago
- Completed: 1911; 115 years ago
- Cost: ₹2.5 crore
- Owner: Kingdom of Cochin Cochin Maharaja (former); Government of Kerala (present)
- Operator: Hon. Resident Commissioner of Kerala to Government of India

Technical details
- Floor area: 1,000 m^{2} (11,000 sq ft)
- Lifts/elevators: 5

Design and construction
- Main contractor: Sobha Singh

Other information
- Number of rooms: 66

Website
- keralahouse.kerala.gov.in/

Kerala House is the official state mission of Government of Kerala at New Delhi. Each state of India has to maintain a statutory representative and state mission house in the capital to liaison with the Central Government on behalf of the state.

The complex belongs to the Kerala state government, which is represented by Hon. Resident Commissioner of Kerala state administration. The complex is located in New Delhi at Jantar Mantar Road. The current Resident Commissioner is Shri. Saurabh Jain IAS.

== History ==
The original main structure is the Cochin House, which was the residence of the Maharaja of Cochin whenever he visited the capital city for sessions of the Chamber of Princes. Built by Sujan Singh Hadaliwale and used by his son Sir Sobha Singh in 1911, the house is known as 'Vyukunt'. Sobha Singh sold the palace to Cochin Maharaja H.H Rama Varma, who came to Delhi to attend the Chamber of Princes in 1920.

In 1927, the Cochin Government decided to construct an annex next to the main palace to accommodate an office facility and staff quarters. By 1940, at the request of the Government of British India, the annex building was handed over to the government to accommodate the war offices of India. From 1942-1945, the building became the temporary office of the Political Representative of the United States of America to British India (de facto American Embassy). In 1945, the government of India handed over the building back to the Cochin Government.

After Independence, when Kochi joined the Indian Union, the house became state property and was adopted as 'Kerala House', a permanent mission of the state to the Central Government.

Another structure administered by Kerala is Travancore House, the former residence of the Maharaja of Travancore, located close to Kerala House.

== Administration ==
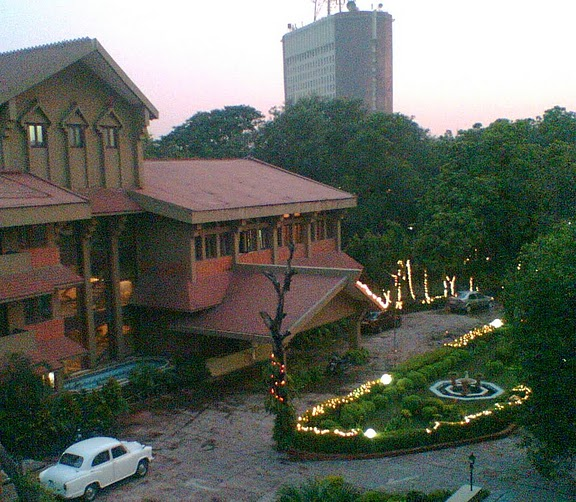
Modern annex of Kerala House

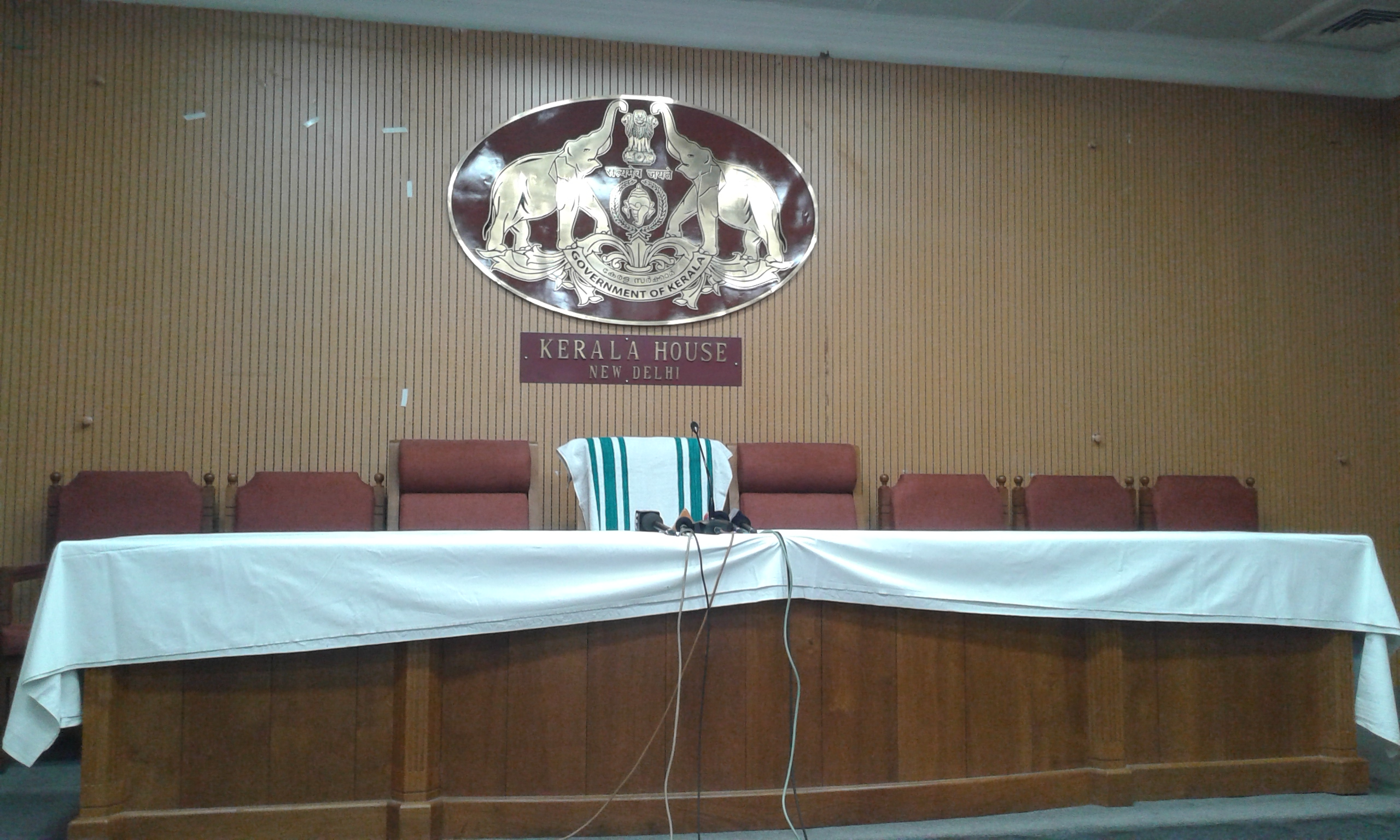
Conference room

The Kerala House belongs to the Kerala State Public Works Department. The house is administered by the Controller of Kerala House, who reports to the Hon. Resident Commissioner. Currently, Kerala House offers accommodation facilities to members of the Kerala Legislative Assembly, and other politicians from Kerala, visiting New Delhi for official purposes.

The controller is assisted by a chief administrative officer and various section officers and assistants. The house has three major divisions functioning

- The Office of Protocol Department, which has a chief protocol officer who oversees all protocol and procedures accorded to state ministers and other officials while they visit New Delhi
- The Office of Liaison Department has three departments

Liaison Wing is headed by the Liaison Officer and is assisted by seven Assistant Liaison Officers. This office is responsible for follow-up and co-ordination of various matters/projects/schemes of the Government of Kerala with the Government of India, including release of funds. This wing also handles appointments of State Ministers and Officials with various Union Ministers and Officers.

MPs Cell

The MPs Cell is functioning at Kerala House to cater to the official needs of the Members of Parliament from Kerala. This Cell is also headed by a Liaison Officer and is assisted by Assistant Liaison Officers.

Law Wing

A Law Wing, headed by the Law Officer and assisted by an Assistant, is functioning at Kerala House to oversee legal matters of the Government of Kerala before constitutional courts in New Delhi.

PWD Wing

PWD Wing; headed by Assistant Executive Engineer and assisted by Assistant Engineer and Overseers is functioning in Kerala House for maintenance and repair works of Kerala House.

The Information and Public Relations Wing

Kerala Information Office at Kerala House is headed by an Information Officer. The Public Relations Department coordinates with the media and oversees the PR requirements of the State Government, including the conduct of various cultural programmes. This office organizes press conferences, issues press releases, and provides video footage, photographs and other media coverage for the state government. The information office is the co-ordinating agency for the state for major events, such as the India International Trade Fair, the Republic Day Parade, and Kerala Piravi celebrations.

Tourism Information Office

A Tourism Information Office, headed by the Deputy Director and assisted by a Tourist Information Officer, is functioning in the Travancore House, located at KG Marg, to cater to the needs of tourists visiting Kerala.

=== Norka Cell ===
A Norka Cell headed by the Additional Secretary and assisted by a Joint Secretary/Deputy Secretary and an NRK Development Officer is functioning in Travancore House to oversee issues related to non-resident Keralites. The NORKA Cell facilitates attestation of certificates sent from various attestation centres of Kerala in various embassies, it also addresses the needs of non-resident Malayalees.

=== Malayala Bhasha Padana Kendram (Malayalam Learning Centre) ===
This is a project initiated jointly by various Malayali Associations in Delhi and the Government of Kerala. The project envisages imparting Malayalam literacy and cultural heritage amongst the new generation of the Malayalee community in the National Capital Region. The central office of Padana Kendra is at Travancore House.

=== Cauvery Cell ===
The Cauvery Cell of the Water Resources Department is functioning at the Travancore House to follow up the Cauvery Water Dispute with the Cauvery Tribunal.

KSEB Liaison Office

This office liaises with the concerned Central Ministries and offices on behalf of the Kerala State Electricity Board.

Travancore House Art Gallery

Travancore House was the erstwhile Palace of the Travancore Kingdom in the heart of the Capital city. The building has been categorized as a heritage building by New Delhi Municipal Council. The Kerala government seeks to transform this heritage building into a cultural complex that could serve as a window to Kerala for the outside world.

=== Resident Commissioner ===
The Resident Commissioner is the head of all State Government Offices functioning in New Delhi. The Office of the Resident Commissioner, Kerala House, New Delhi, was established in 1964. There is an Additional Resident Commissioner, of a rank equivalent to the Secretary to Government of Kerala, to assist the Resident Commissioner.

== Structure ==
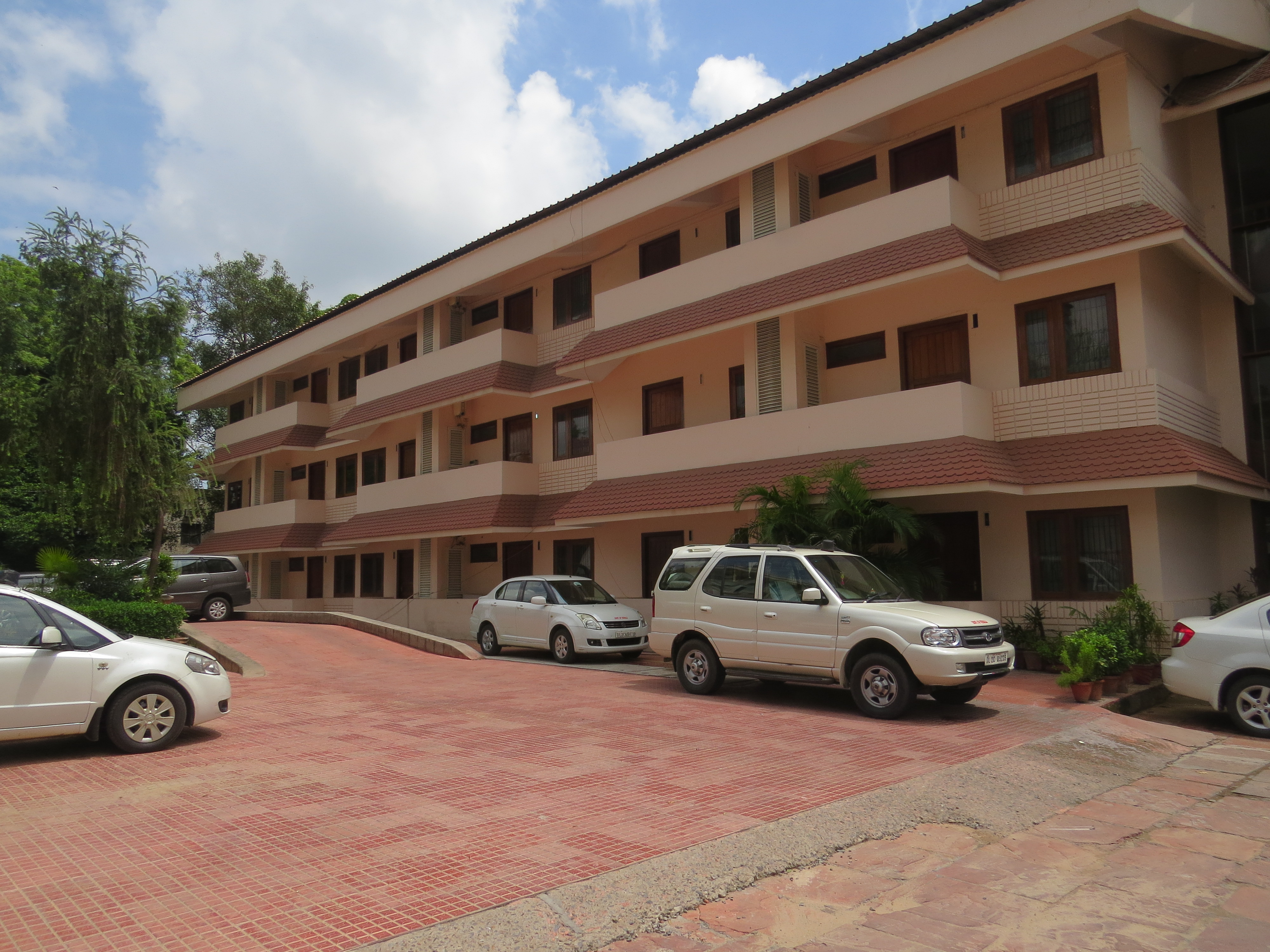
Guest apartments

The guest house in Kerala House consists of two Blocks. The Main Block, part of the annex building, has 33 rooms, including the three VIP Suites. There are 30 additional rooms mainly used for families of officials and staff. Rooms are allotted to visiting MPs, MLAs, government officials on duty, judges and judicial officials, etc. In some cases, rooms are also allotted to private individuals, based on government directives or proper references.

The historic Cochin House has been renovated to restore its classic beauty. The palace has been exclusively reserved for the accommodation of the Governor of Kerala, Ministers, and VIPs. The Palace features 7 suites and 3 rooms in addition to 2 security quarters.

There is a 48-bed-dormitory available at Travancore House. Travancore House features a cultural museum, office of Kerala Tourism, and reception facility for tourists, a state hall accommodating 100 guests, and an amphitheatre that can accommodate 250 persons.

=== Guest House Canteen ===
The canteen, Samrudhi, serves traditional Kerala cuisine to all its residents and outsiders. The canteen features both vegetarian and non-vegetarian preparations.

=== Other facilities ===
The Guest House offers 24-hour housekeeping and room service facility, a medical clinic with resident doctor, a state-of-the-art Conference room & media room, a Business Center, Steward and laundry services, in addition to a Tourist reception center and Travel desk.
