= Delhi: A Novel =

1990 book by Khushwant Singh

- Author: Khushwant Singh
- Translator: Irfan Ahmad Khan Lahore, Pakistan
- Language: English
- Genre: Historical novel
- Published: 1990
- Publisher: Penguin Books India Ltd
- Publication place: India

Delhi: A Novel is a historical novel by Indian writer Khushwant Singh published in 1990. The novel was a bestseller in India when first published but received little critical attention compared to Amitav Ghosh's novel The Shadow Lines that also covered the 1984 anti-Sikh riots.

== Text ==
The book moves backwards and forwards in time through the history of Delhi. It has as its backdrop the story of a journalist fallen on bad times and his relationship with a hijra named Bhagmati.

This magnum opus on the city of Delhi starts with the narrator, suggestively Khushwant Singh himself, just returning from England after ‘having his fill of whoring in foreign lands’, a bawdy, aging reprobate who loves the city of Delhi, as much as he loves the ugly but energetic Bhagmati, whom he literally picks up from a deserted road on a hot Delhi summer noon. Having no place to go after completing her jail sentence in the dreaded Tihar Jail, she begs to be taken under his wing. Khushwant obliges, and thus begins a relationship of ups and downs in the narrator's life. Bhagmati vitalizes her life amidst the majestic remains of Delhi in its heyday, and even saves the narrator's life from the mad mobs of the 1984 anti-Sikh riots.

== Writing ==
Singh claims it took him almost twenty-five years to complete this novel. He dedicates it to his son Rahul Singh and Niloufer Billimoria. 'History provided me a skeleton', he jokes, 'I covered it with flesh and injected blood and a lot of seminal fluid into it'.

Some parts of the novel were also published in the Evergreen Review and The Illustrated Weekly of India.

== Urdu translation ==
This novel was Urdu translated by Irfan Ahmad Khan, Lahore, Pakistan. Singh himself allowed Khan to recover royalty of his unauthorised publications from the publishers of Pakistan. The Urdu translation publications were in October 1998, April 1999, January 2000, May 2000, February 2005.
