= Gurbux Singh (Indian Army officer) =

Indian military officer (1916–2013)

Brigadier Gurbux Singh
- Born: c. 1916; Hadali, Punjab Province, British India
- Died: 2013 (age 97)
- Relatives: Khushwant Singh (brother)
- Military career
- Allegiance: India
- Branch: Indian Army
- Rank: Brigadier
- Units: 48th Indian Infantry Brigade; 4th Infantry Division (India)
- Commands: 48th Indian Infantry Brigade
- Conflicts: Annexation of Goa; 1962 Sino-Indian War

Brigadier Gurbux Singh (c.1916–2013) was an Indian Army General Officer who had fought in various wars such as the Annexation of Goa and was famed in his role in the 1962 Sino-Indian War and the retreat of the Bomdila Pass.

He also came from a highly distinguished family—he was the younger brother of the legendary Indian author and journalist Khushwant Singh

== Death ==
He died in New Delhi at the age of 97.

== See also ==
- Brij Mohan Kaul
- Jayanto Nath Chaudhuri
