= Khushwant Singh =

Indian writer (1915–2014)

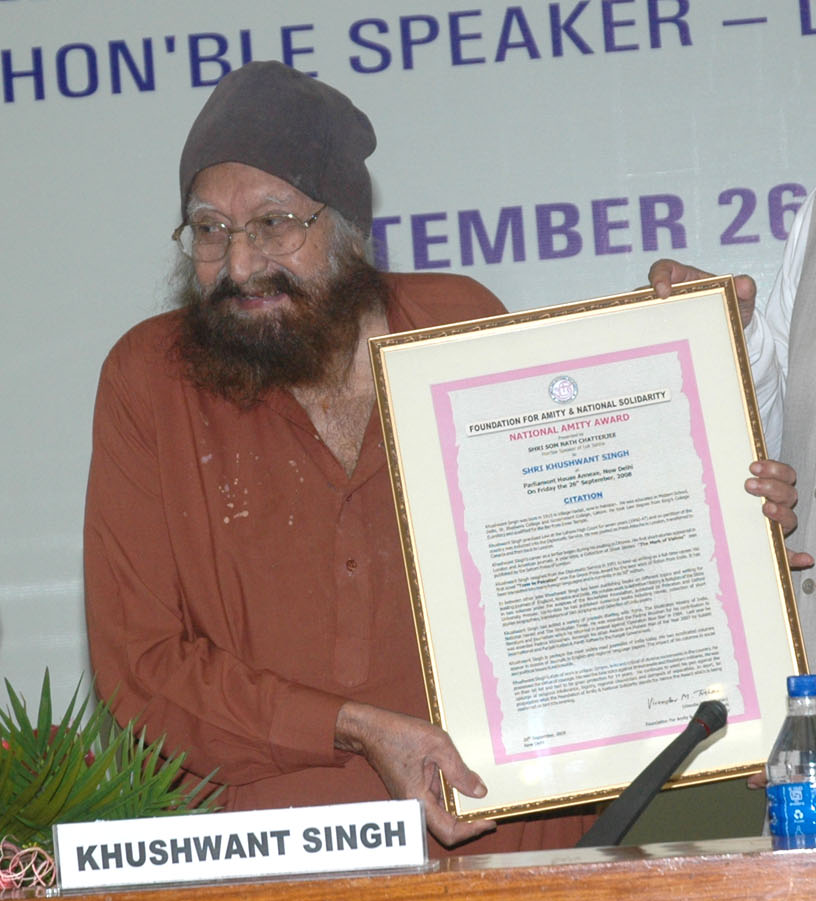
- Khushwant Singh receiving the National Amity Award, in New Delhi on September 26, 2008
- Born: Khushal Singh; 2 February 1915; Hadali, Punjab Province, British India (now in Punjab, Pakistan)
- Died: 20 March 2014 (aged 99); New Delhi, India
- Education: Government College, Lahore (B.A.); University of London (LL.B.)
- Occupations: Lawyer, journalist, diplomat, writer, politician
- Relatives: Sardar Sujan Singh (grandfather); Lakshmi Devi (grandmother); Sir Sobha Singh (father); Viran Bai (mother); Sardar Ujjal Singh (uncle); Bhagwant Singh (brother); Brigadier Gurbux Singh (brother); Daljit Singh (brother); Mohinder Kaur (sister); Kanwal Malik (spouse); Rahul Singh (son); Mala (daughter); Sir Teja Singh Malik (father-in-law)
- Writing career
- Notable works: The History of Sikhs; Train to Pakistan; Delhi: A Novel; The Company of Women; Truth, Love and a Little Malice: An Autobiography; With Malice towards One and All; Why I Supported the Emergency: Essays and Profiles; Khushwantnama, The Lessons of My Life; Punjab, Punjabis & Punjabiyat: Reflections on a Land and its People; The Mark of Vishnu and Other Stories; The Portrait of a Lady
- Notable awards: Rockefeller Grant; Padma Bhushan; Honest Man of the Year; Punjab Rattan Award; Padma Vibhushan; Sahitya Akademi Fellowship; All-India Minorities Forum Annual Fellowship Award; Lifetime Achievement Award; Fellow of King's College; The Grove Press Award

Khushwant Singh FKC (born Khushal Singh, 2 February 1915 – 20 March 2014) was an Indian author, lawyer, diplomat, journalist and politician. His experience in the 1947 Partition of India inspired him to write Train to Pakistan in 1956 (made into film in 1998), which became his most well-known novel.

Born in Punjab, Khushwant Singh was educated in Modern School, New Delhi, St. Stephen's College, and graduated from Government College, Lahore. He studied at King's College London and was awarded an LL.B. from University of London. He was called to the bar at the London Inner Temple. After working as a lawyer in Lahore High Court for eight years, he joined the Indian Foreign Service upon the Independence of India from British Empire in 1947. He was appointed journalist in the All India Radio in 1951, and then moved to the Department of Mass Communications of UNESCO at Paris in 1956. These last two careers encouraged him to pursue a literary career. As a writer, he was best known for his trenchant secularism, humour, sarcasm and an abiding love of poetry. His comparisons of social and behavioural characteristics of Westerners and Indians are laced with acid wit. He served as the editor of several literary and news magazines, as well as two newspapers, through the 1970s and 1980s. Between 1980 and 1986 he served as Member of Parliament in Rajya Sabha, the upper house of the Parliament of India.

Khushwant Singh was awarded the Padma Bhushan in 1974; however, he returned the award in 1984 in protest against Operation Blue Star in which the Indian Army raided Amritsar. In 2007, he was awarded the Padma Vibhushan, the second-highest civilian award in India.

== Early life ==
Khushwant Singh (Punjabi: Gurmukhi: ਖ਼ੁਸ਼ਵੰਤ ਸਿੰਘ, Shahmukhi: خْوَشْوَنْت سِن٘گھ) was born in Hadali, Khushab District, Punjab (which now lies in Pakistan), in a Khatri Sikh family of the Khurana Clan. He was the younger son of Sir Sobha Singh and Veeran Bai. Births and deaths were not recorded in his time, and for him his father simply made up 2 February 1915 for his school enrollment at Modern School, New Delhi. But his grandmother Lakshmi Devi asserted that he was born in August, so he later set the date for himself as 15 August. Sobha Singh was a prominent builder in Lutyens' Delhi. His uncle Sardar Ujjal Singh (1895–1983) was previously Governor of Punjab and Tamil Nadu.

His birth name, given by his grandmother, was Khushal Singh (meaning "Prosperous Lion"). He was called by a pet name "Shalee". At school his name earned him ridicule as other boys would mock him with an expression, "Shalee Shoolee, Bagh dee Moolee" (meaning, "This shalee or shoolee is the radish of some garden.") He chose Khushwant so that it rhymes with his elder brother's name Bhagwant. He declared that his new name was "self-manufactured and meaningless". However, he later discovered that there was a Hindu physician with the same name, and the number subsequently increased.

He entered the Delhi Modern School in 1920 and studied there till 1930. There he met his future wife, Kanwal Malik, one year his junior. He studied Intermediate of Arts at St. Stephen's College in Delhi during 1930-1932. He pursued higher education at Government College, Lahore, in 1932, and got his BA in 1934 by a "third-class degree". Then he went to King's College London to study law, and was awarded an LL.B. from University of London in 1938. He was subsequently called to the bar at the London Inner Temple.

== Career ==
Khushwant Singh started his professional career as a practising lawyer in 1939 at Lahore in the Chamber of Manzur Qadir and Ijaz Husain Batalvi. He worked at Lahore Court for eight years where he worked with some of his best friends and fans including Akhtar Aly Kureshy, Advocate, and Raja Muhammad Arif, Advocate. In 1947, he entered the Indian Foreign Service for the newly independent India. He started as Information Officer of the Government of India in Toronto, Canada, and moved on to be the Press Attaché and Public Officer for the Indian High Commission for four years in London and Ottawa. In 1951, he joined the All India Radio as a journalist. Between 1954 and 1956 he worked in Department of Mass Communication of the UNESCO at Paris. From 1956 he turned to editorial services. He founded and edited Yojana, an Indian government journal in 1951–1953; The Illustrated Weekly of India, a newsweekly National Herald. He was also appointed as editor of Hindustan Times on Indira Gandhi's personal recommendation.

During his tenure, The Illustrated Weekly became India's pre-eminent newsweekly, with its circulation raising from 65,000 to 400,000. After working for nine years in the weekly, on 25 July 1978, a week before he was to retire, the management asked Singh to leave "with immediate effect". A new editor was installed the same day. After Singh's departure, the weekly suffered a huge drop in readership. In 2016 Khushwant Singh enters Limca Book of Records as a tribute.

== Politics ==
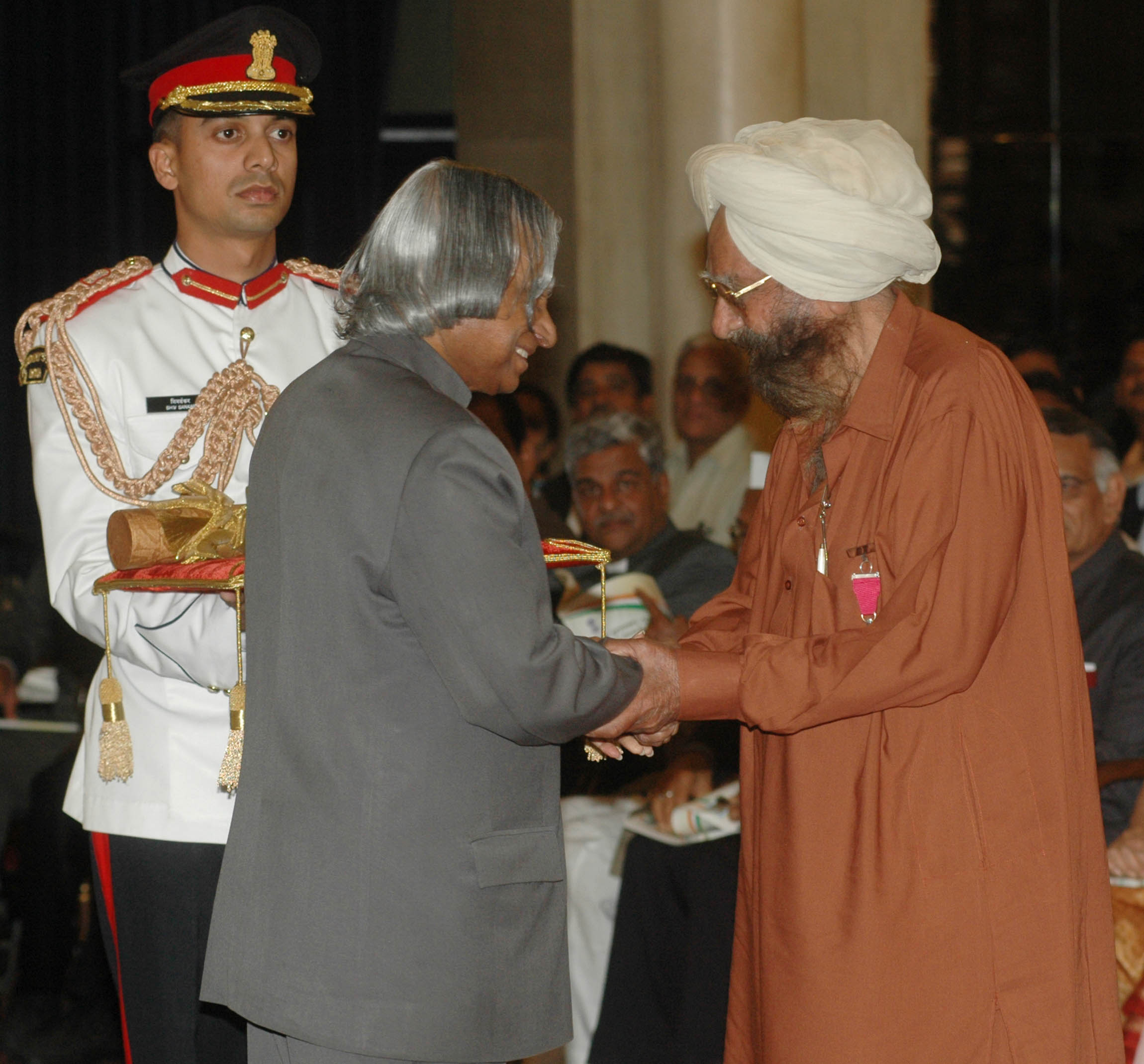
Khushwant Singh meeting Dr. A.P.J. Abdul Kalam before receiving the Padma Vibhushan.

From 1980 to 1986, Singh was a member of Rajya Sabha, the upper house of the Indian parliament. He was awarded the Padma Bhushan in 1974 for service to his country. In 1984, he returned the award in protest against the siege of the Golden Temple by the Indian Army. In 2007, the Indian government awarded Khushwant Singh the Padma Vibhushan.

As a public figure, Khushwant Singh was accused of favouring the ruling Congress party, especially during the reign of Indira Gandhi. When Indira Gandhi announced nation-wide-emergency, he openly supported it and was derisively called an 'establishment liberal'.

Singh's faith in the Indian political system was shaken by the anti-Sikh riots that followed Indira Gandhi's assassination, in which major Congress politicians are alleged to be involved; but he remained resolutely positive on the promise of Indian democracy and worked via Citizens Justice Committee floated by H. S. Phoolka who is a senior advocate of Delhi High Court, and was a member of The Sikh Forum of Lt. Gen. Jagjit Singh Aurora.

Singh was a votary of greater diplomatic relations with Israel at a time when India did not want to displease Arab nations where thousands of Indians found employment. He visited Israel in the 1970s and was impressed by its progress.

== Personal life ==
Khushwant Singh was married to Kanwal Malik. Malik was his childhood friend who had moved to London earlier. They met again when he studied law at King's College London, and soon got married. They were married in Delhi, with Chetan Anand and Iqbal Singh as the only invitees. Muhammad Ali Jinnah also attended the formal service. They had a son, named Rahul Singh, and a daughter, named Mala. His wife predeceased him in 2001. Actress Amrita Singh is the granddaughter of his sister Mohinder Kaur. He stayed in "Sujan Singh Park", near Khan Market New Delhi, Delhi's first apartment complex, built by his father in 1945, and named after his grandfather.

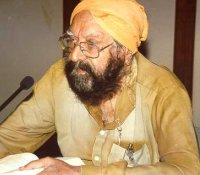
Khushwant Singh at a reading in New Delhi.

=== Religious belief ===
Singh was a self-proclaimed agnostic, as the title of his 2011 book Agnostic Khushwant: There is no God explicitly revealed. He was particularly against organised religion. He was evidently inclined towards atheism, as he said, "One can be a saintly person without believing in God and a detestable villain believing in him. In my personalised religion, There Is No God!" He also once said, "I don't believe in rebirth or in reincarnation, in the day of judgement or in heaven or hell. I accept the finality of death." His last book The Good, The Bad and The Ridiculous was published in October 2013, following which he retired from writing. The book was his continued critique of religion and especially its practice in India, including the critique of the clergy and priests. It earned a lot of acclaim in India. Khushwant Singh had once controversially claimed that Sikhism was a "warrior branch of Hinduism".

Singh had once remarked his admiration for a Hindu spiritual leader (guru) Kripalu Maharaj, saying that the guru's "gift of the gab" is "more forthright, logical, lucid" than other gurus, and that his teaching "makes more sense to a non-believer like me than others". When he learned of the death of the guru's wife in 2009, he sent a note of condolence, describing: "People like me do not believe in swarg (heaven), nark (hell), pichhla janam (previous birth) or agla janam (next birth). There is no proof whatsoever to back these speculations."

=== Death ===
Singh died of natural causes on 20 March 2014 at his Delhi residence, at the age of 99. The President, Vice-President and Prime Minister of India all issued messages honouring Singh. He was cremated at Lodhi Crematorium in Delhi at 4 in the afternoon of the same day. During his lifetime, Khushwant Singh was keen on burial because he believed that with a burial we give back to the earth what we have taken. He had requested the management of the Baháʼí Faith if he could be buried in their cemetery. After initial agreement, they had proposed some conditions which were unacceptable to Singh, and hence the idea was later abandoned. He was born in Hadali, Khushab District in the Punjab Province of modern Pakistan, in 1915. According to his wishes, some of his ashes were brought and scattered in Hadali.

In 1943 he had already written his own obituary, included in his collection of short stories Posthumous. Under the headline "Sardar Khushwant Singh Dead", the text reads:

We regret to announce the sudden death of Sardar Khushwant Singh at 6 pm last evening. He leaves behind a young widow, two infant children and a large number of friends and admirers. Amongst those who called at the late sardar’s residence were the PA to the chief justice, several ministers, and judges of the high court.

He also prepared an epitaph for himself, which runs:

Here lies one who spared neither man nor God;
Waste not your tears on him, he was a sod;
Writing nasty things he regarded as great fun;
Thank the Lord he is dead, this son of a gun.

He was cremated and his ashes are buried in Hadali school, where a plaque is placed bearing the inscription:

IN MEMORY OF
SARDAR KHUSHWANT SINGH
(1915–2014)
A SIKH, A SCHOLAR AND A SON OF HADALI (Punjab)
'This is where my roots are. I have nourished them with tears of nostalgia...'

== Honours and awards ==
- Rockefeller Grant, 1966
- Padma Bhushan, Government of India (1974) (He returned the decoration in 1984 in protest against the Union government's siege of the Golden Temple, Amritsar)
- Honest Man of the Year, Sulabh International (2000)
- Punjab Ratan, The Government of Punjab (2006)
- Padma Vibhushan, Government of India (2007)
- Sahitya Akademi Fellowship by Sahitya Akademi of India (2010)
- 'All-India Minorities Forum Annual Fellowship Award' by Uttar Pradesh Chief Minister Akhilesh Yadav (2012)
- Lifetime achievement award by Tata Literature Live! The Mumbai Litfest in 2013
- Fellow of King's College London in January 2014
- 'The Grove Press Award' for the best fiction.

== Literary works ==
=== Books ===
- The Mark of Vishnu and Other Stories, (short story collection) 1950
- The History of Sikhs, 1953
- Train to Pakistan, (novel) 1956
- The Voice of God and Other Stories, (short story) 1957
- I Shall Not Hear the Nightingale, (novel) 1959
- The Sikhs Today, 1959
- The Fall of the Kingdom of the Punjab, 1962
- A History of the Sikhs, 1963
- Ranjit Singh: The Maharaja of the Punjab, 1963
- Ghadar 1915: India's first armed revolution, 1966
- A Bride of the Sahib and Other Stories, (short story) 1967
- Black Jasmine, (short story) 1971
- Tragedy of Punjab, 1984 (with Kuldip Nayar)
- The Sikhs, 1984
- The Collected Stories of Khushwant Singh, Ravi Dayal Publisher, 1989
- More Malicious Gossip, 1989 (collection of essays)
- Delhi: A Novel, (Novel) 1990
- Sex, Scotch & Scholarship, 1992 (collection of essays)
- Not a Nice Man to Know: The Best of Khushwant Singh, 1993
- We Indians, 1993
- Women and Men in My Life, 1995
- Declaring Love in Four Languages, by Khushwant Singh and Sharda Kaushik, 1997
- The Company of Women, (novel) 1999
- Big Book of Malice, 2000, (collection of essays)
- India: An Introduction, 2003
- Truth, Love & a Little Malice: An Autobiography, 2002
- With Malice towards One and All
- The End of India, 2003
- Burial at the Sea, 2004
- A History of the Sikhs, 2004 (2nd edition)
- Paradise and Other Stories, 2004
- A History of the Sikhs: 1469–1838, 2004
- Death at My Doorstep, 2004
- A History of the Sikhs: 1839–2004, 2005
- The Illustrated History of the Sikhs, 2006
- Land of Five Rivers, 2006
- Why I Supported the Emergency: Essays and Profiles, 2009
- The Sunset Club, (novel) 2010
- Gods and Godmen of India, 2012
- Agnostic Khushwant: There is no God, 2012
- The Freethinker's Prayer Book and Some Words to Live By, 2012
- The Good, the Bad and the Ridiculous, 2013 (co-authored with Humra Qureshi)
- Khushwantnama, The Lessons of My Life, 2013
- Punjab, Punjabis & Punjabiyat: Reflections on a Land and its People, 2018 (posthumously compiled by his daughter Mala Dayal)

=== Short story ===
- The Portrait of a Lady
- The Strain
- Success Mantra
- A Love Affair in London
- The Wog
- The Portrait of a Lady: Collected Stories (2013)

=== Play ===
Television Documentary: Third World—Free Press (also presenter; Third Eye series), 1983 (UK).

== See also ==
- Karma, a short story by Khushwant Singh
- List of Indian writers
