= Sarfraz =

Sarfrāz or Sarfaraz (Bengali: সরফরাজ, Urdu: سرفراز) is a masculine given name and surname of Persian origin. Notable people with the name include:

== Given name ==
- Sarfaraz Ahmad, Indian politician
- Sarfaraz Ahmed (born 1987), Pakistani cricketer
- Sarfaraz Alam, Indian politician
- Sarfaraz Ashraf (born 1989), Indian cricketer
- Sarfaraz Khan (disambiguation), multiple people
- Sarfaraz K. Niazi (born 1949), Pakistani-American academic
- Sarfaraz Ahmed Rafiqui (1935–1965), Pakistani fighter pilot
- Sarfraz Ali (disambiguation), multiple people
- Sarfraz Bugti (born 1980), Pakistani politician
- Sarfraz Hussain, Pakistani politician
- Sarfraz Manzoor (born 1971), British-Pakistani journalist
- Sarfraz Ahmed Naeemi (1948–2009), Pakistani cleric
- Sarfraz Nawaz (born 1948), a former Pakistani cricketer
- Sarfraz Rafiqui (1935–1965), a Pakistani pilot
- Sarfraz Rasool (born 1975), a Pakistani footballer
- Sarfraz Sattar, Pakistani retired general.
- Sarfraz Shahid (1938–2021), Pakistani poet
- Mir Sarfraz Chakar Domki (1969–2024), Pakistani politician

== Surname ==
- Aamer Sarfraz, Baron Sarfraz (born 1981), British-Pakistani businessman and politician
- Akhtar Sarfraz (1976–2019), Pakistani cricketer
- Ali Sarfraz (born 1987), Pakistani cricketer
- Omer Sarfraz Cheema (born 1969), Pakistani politician
- Raja Muhammed Sarfraz Khan (1905–1968), Pakistani philanthropist and politician
- Zafar Sarfraz (1969–2020), Pakistani cricketer

== Places ==
- Kot Sarfraz Khan a town in Pakistan
