= 1937 Punjab Legislative Assembly election =

Punjab Assembly Election of 1937

1937 Punjab Provincial Assembly election
- 1936-37

175 seats of the Punjab Provincial Assembly 88 seats needed for a majority
- Turnout: 64.23%
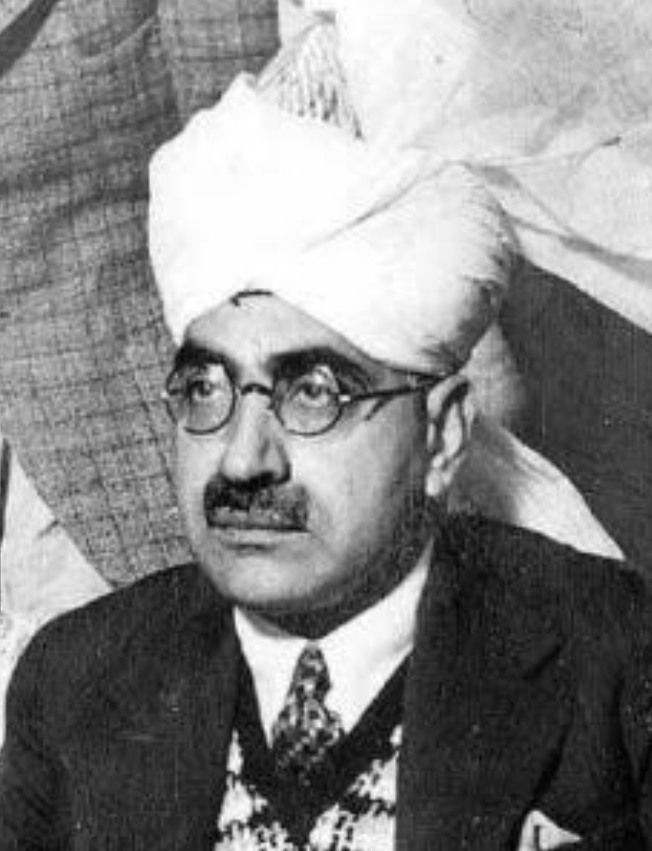

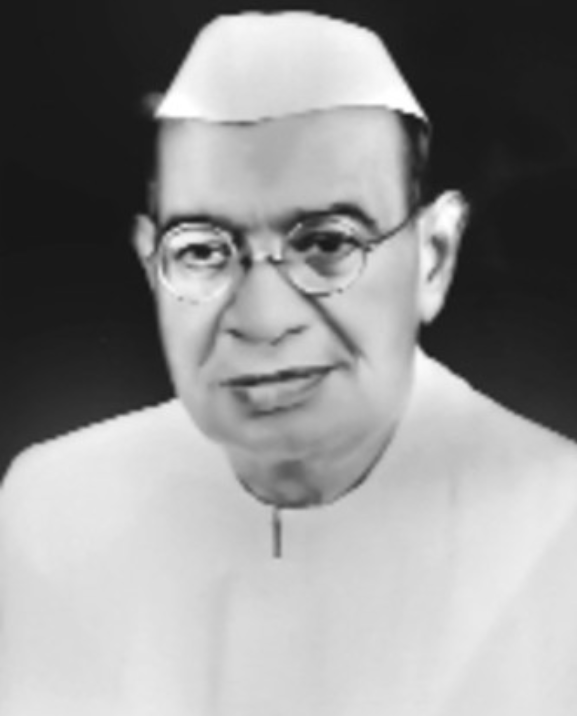

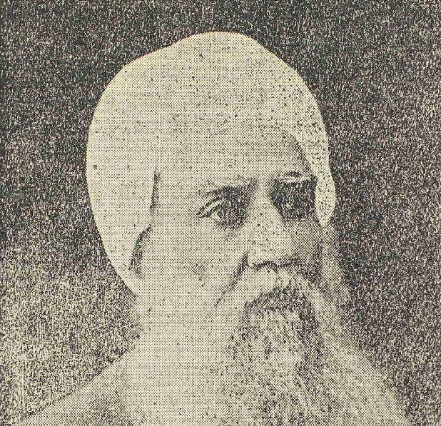
| | First party | Second party | Third party |
|---|---|---|---|
| Leader | Sikandar Hayat Khan | Gopi Chand Bhargava | Sundar Singh Majithia |
| Party | Unionist | INC | KNP |
| Leader's seat | North Punjab (Landholders) (Muhammadans) | Lahore City (General-Urban) | Batala (Sikh-Rural) |
| Seats won | 98 | 18 | 13 |
Elected Premier
Sikandar Hayat Khan
Unionist

First Provincial assembly election was held in Punjab in the winter of 1936-37 as mandated by the Government of India Act 1935.

== Background ==
After the passing of Government of India act 1935, Provincial assembly was set up in Punjab. It consisted of 175 constituencies. Out of these 159 were single-member constituencies and 8 were double-members constituencies. In double-members constituencies one was reserved for the Schedule Caste according to Poona Pact. In double constituencies each voter had two votes to cast his vote, one for SC candidate and one for general candidate but considered as one vote to calculate voter turnout.

All 175 constituencies were reserved on the basis of religion. It was as follows:-

| Constituency Type | Urban | Rural | Total |
|---|---|---|---|
| General | 8 | 34 | 42 |
| Muhammadans | 9 | 75 | 84 |
| Sikhs | 2 | 29 | 31 |
| Special^ | - | - | 18 |
| Total | 19 | 138 | 175 |

^Special constituencies (non-territory constituency) were further divided into Categories and sub-categories as follow:-

- Women - 4
  - General - 1
  - Mohammadans - 2
  - Sikhs - 1
- European - 1
- Anglo-Indian - 1
- Indian Christian - 2
- Punjab Commerce and Industry - 1
- Landholders - 5
  - General - 1
  - Mohammadans - 3
  - Sikhs - 1
- Trade and Labour Unions - 3
- University - 1

== Election schedule ==
The election schedule was as follows:-

| Election program | Date |
|---|---|
| Filing of nominations | 23 November 1936 |
| Scrutiny of nominations | 30 November 1936 |
| Polling | 1 December 1936 |
| Counting | 2 and 7 December 1936 |
| Counting in Special constituencies | 21 January 1937 |

== Voter Statistics ==
During 1937 election there were total 27,84,646 voters. Out of these 64.23% voters cast their votes.

26,66,149 voters were in Territorial Constituencies and 1,18,497 were in Non-Territorial Constituencies.

In territorial constituencies the highest number of voters (39,290) were in '24-Hoshiarpur West (General-Rural)' and lowest number of voters (5,496) were in '62-Tarn Taran (Muhammadan-Rural)'. The highest vote turnout (89.87%) registered in '81-Shahpur (Muhammadan-Rural)' and lowest (3.93%) registered in '122-Ambala North (Sikh-Rural)'.

In Non-Territorial Constituencies the highest number of voters (58,106) were in '153-Amritsar (Women-Sikh)' and lowest number of voters (10) were in '163-Baluch Tumandars (Landholders)'. Highest vote turnout (98.35%) was registered in '158-Punjab Commerce and Industry (Commerce and Industry)' and lowest (40.53%) registered in '151-Inner Lahore (Women-Mohammadan)'.

== Results ==

| Party | Seats won | |
|---|---|---|
| Unionist Party (UoP) | 98 | |
| Indian National Congress (INC) | 18 | 29 (Note: Indian National Congress and Shiroamani Akali Dal Contested 1936-37 election in coalition.) |
| Shiromani Akali Dal (SAD) | 11 | 29 |
| Khalsa National Party (KNP) | 13 | |
| Hindu Election Board (HEB) | 12 | |
| Majlis-e-Ahrar-ul-Islam (MAI) | 4 | |
| All-India Muslim League (AIML) | 2 | |
| Congress Nationalist Party (CNP) | 1 | |
| Independents (IND) | 16 | |
| Total | 175 | |
Source=

== Category wise result ==
| S. No. | Party | Category (Seats) | | | | | | | |
| S. No. | Party | General Urban (8) | General Rural (34) | Muhammadans Urban (9) | Muhammadans Rural (75) | Sikh Urban (2) | Sikh Rural (29) | Special (18) | Total (175) |
|---|---|---|---|---|---|---|---|---|---|
| 1 | Unionist Party | - | 15 | 3 | 72 | - | 2 | 6 | 98 |
| 2 | Indian National Congress | 7 | 3 | - | 2 | - | 4 | 2 | 18 |
| 3 | Khalsa National Party | - | - | - | - | 2 | 10 | 1 | 13 |
| 4 | Hindu Election Board | 1 | 9 | - | - | - | - | 2 | 12 |
| 5 | Shiromani Akali Dal | - | - | - | - | - | 10 | 1 | 11 |
| 6 | Majlis-e-Ahrar-ul-Islam | - | - | 4 | - | - | - | - | 4 |
| 7 | All-India Muslim League | - | - | 1 | 1 | - | - | - | 2 |
| 8 | Congress Nationalist Party | - | 1 | - | - | - | - | - | 1 |
| 9 | Independents | - | 6 | 1 | - | - | 3 | 6 | 16 |

Special (18)

- Women (4)
  - General (1)
    - Indian National Congress - 1
  - Mohammadans (2)
    - Independents - 2
  - Sikhs (1)
    - Shiromani Akali Dal - 1
- European (1)
  - Independent - 1
- Anglo Indian (1)
  - Independent - 1
- Indian Christian (2)
  - Unionist Party - 2
- Punjab Commerce and Industry (1)
  - Independent - 1
- Landholders (5)
  - General (1)
    - Hindu Election Board - 1
  - Mohammadans (3)
    - Unionist Party - 3
  - Sikhs (1)
    - Khalsa National Party - 1
- Trade and Labour Unions (3)
  - Hindu Election Board - 1
  - Indian National Congress - 1
  - Unionist Party - 1
- University (1)
  - Independent - 1

== Constituency wise result ==
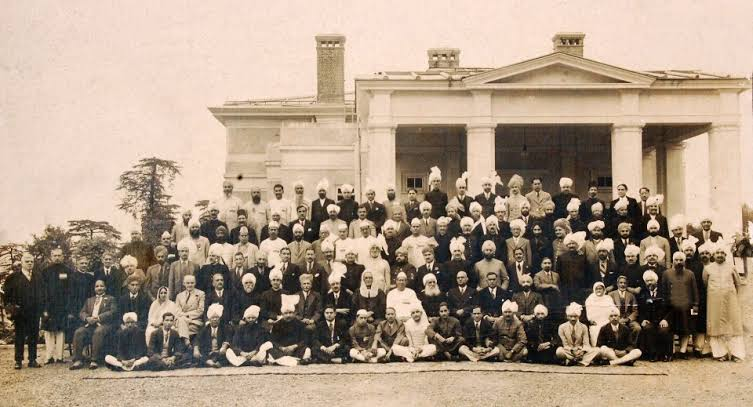
Group Photo of Member of Punjab Provincial Assembly in 1937.

Color key for the Party of Candidates

- Indian National Congress
- Shiromani Akali Dal
- Unionist Party
- Independent
- Khalsa National Party
- Hindu Election Board
- Majlis-e-Ahrar-ul-Islam
- All-India Muslim League
- Congress Nationalist Party

Other color keys

- Candidate Elected Unopposed
- Constituency reserved for Schedule Caste

General Urban

| S. No. | Cons. No. | Constituency | Winner | Party |
|---|---|---|---|---|
| 1 | 1 | Southern Towns | Shri Ram Sharma | Indian National Congress |
| 2 | 2 | South-Eastern Towns | Deshbandhu Gupta | Indian National Congress |
| 3 | 3 | Eastern Towns | Sudarshan Seth | Indian National Congress |
| 4 | 4 | Lahore City | Gopi Chand Bhargava | Indian National Congress |
| 5 | 5 | Amritsar City | Sant Ram Seth | Indian National Congress |
| 6 | 6 | North-Eastern Towns | Krishan Gopal Dutt | Indian National Congress |
| 7 | 7 | North-Western Towns | Bhimsen Sachar | Indian National Congress |
| 8 | 8 | South-Western Towns | Shiv Dayal | Hindu Election Board |

General Rural

| S. No. | Cons. No. | Constituency | Winner | Party |
|---|---|---|---|---|
| 9 | 9 | Hissar South | Hey Ram | Unionist Party |
| 10 | 10 | Hansi | Suraj Mal | Unionist Party |
| 11 | 11 | Hissar North | Atma Ram | Independent |
| 12 | 12 | Rohtak North | Chaudhary Tika Ram | Unionist Party |
| 13 | 13 | Rohtak Central | Ram Sarup | Unionist Party |
| 14 | 14 | Jhajjar | Chottu Ram | Unionist Party |
| 15 | 15 | North-western Gurgaon | Rao Balbir Singh | Hindu Election Board |
| 16 | 16 | South-Eastern Gurgaon | Prem Singh | Unionist Party |
| 17 | 16 | South-Eastern Gurgaon | Sumer Singh | Unionist Party |
| 18 | 17 | Karnal South | Anant Ram | Unionist Party |
| 19 | 18 | Karnal North | Chaudhary Ranpat | Unionist Party |
| 20 | 18 | Karnal North | Chaudhary Faqira | Unionist Party |
| 21 | 19 | Ambala-Simla | Duni Chand | Indian National Congress |
| 22 | 19 | Ambala-Simla | Jugal Kishore | Independent |
| 23 | 20 | Kangra; North | Gopal Das | Hindu Election Board |
| 24 | 21 | Kangra South | Dina Nath | Hindu Election Board |
| 25 | 22 | Kangra East | Bagwant Singh | Independent |
| 26 | 23 | Kangra West | Bhagat Ram Sharma | Independent |
| 27 | 24 | Hoshiarpur West | Kartar Singh | Indian National Congress |
| 28 | 24 | Hoshiarpur West | Mula Singh | Independent |
| 29 | 25 | Una | Rai Hari Chand | Unionist Party |
| 30 | 26 | Jullundhar | Bhagat Ram Choda | Congress Nationalist Party |
| 31 | 26 | Jullundhar | Seth Krishan Das | Unionist Party |
| 32 | 27 | Ludhiana-Ferozpur | Muni Lal Kalia | Indian National Congress |
| 33 | 27 | Ludhiana-Ferozpur | Gopal Singh | Unionist Party |
| 34 | 28 | Western Lahore | Gokul Chand Narang | Hindu Election Board |
| 35 | 29 | Amritsar-Sialkot | Chaudhary Rai | Hindu Election Board |
| 36 | 29 | Amritsar-Sialkot | Bhagat Hans Raj | Unionist Party |
| 37 | 30 | Gurdaspur | Ripudaman Singh | Hindu Election Board |
| 38 | 31 | Rawalpindi | Mukund Lal | Hindu Election Board |
| 39 | 32 | South-Eastern Multan | Girdhari Lal | Independent |
| 40 | 33 | Layallpur Jhang | Seth Ram Narain Arora | Hindu Election Board |
| 41 | 33 | Layallpur Jhang | Harnam Das | Unionist Party |
| 42 | 34 | West Multan | Sham Lal | Hindu Election Board |

Muhammadan Urban

| S. No. | Cons. No. | Constituency | Winner | Party |
|---|---|---|---|---|
| 43 | 35 | Southern Towns | Gulam Samad | Unionist Party |
| 44 | 36 | South-Eastern Towns | Mian Abdul Haye | Unionist Party |
| 45 | 37 | Eastern Towns | Barkat Ali | All-India Muslim League |
| 46 | 38 | Inner Lahore | Khalid Latif Gauba | Unionist Party |
| 47 | 39 | Outer Lahore | Abdul Aziz | Majlis-e-Ahrar-ul-Islam |
| 48 | 40 | Amritsar City | Saiffudin Kitchlew | Independent |
| 49 | 41 | North-Eastern Towns | Mazhar Ali Azhar | Majlis-e-Ahrar-ul-Islam |
| 50 | 42 | Rawalpindi Towns | Sheikh Muhammad Alam | Majlis-e-Ahrar-ul-Islam |
| 51 | 43 | Multan Towns | Ghulam Hussain | Majlis-e-Ahrar-ul-Islam |

Muhammadan Rural

| S. No | Cons. No. | Constituency | Winner | Party |
|---|---|---|---|---|
| 52 | 44 | Hissar | Saheb daad Khan | Unionist Party |
| 53 | 45 | Rohtak | Shafi Ali Khan | Unionist Party |
| 54 | 46 | North-Western Gurgaon | Yasin Khan | Unionist Party |
| 55 | 47 | South-Eastern Gurgaon | Abdur Rahim | Unionist Party |
| 56 | 48 | Karnal | Faiz Ali | Unionist Party |
| 57 | 49 | Ambala-Simla | Abdul Hamid Khan | Unionist Party |
| 58 | 50 | Kangra East-Hoshiarpur | Rai Faiz Khan | Unionist Party |
| 59 | 51 | Hoshiarpur West | Rana Nasrullah Khan | Unionist Party |
| 60 | 52 | Jullundur North | Abdur Rahman | Unionist Party |
| 61 | 53 | Jullundur South | Abdur Raab | Unionist Party |
| 62 | 54 | Ludhiana | Mohammed Hassan | Indian National Congress |
| 63 | 55 | Ferozpur Central | Shah Nawaz Khan Mamdot | Unionist Party |
| 64 | 56 | Ferozpur Eastern | Amjad Ali Khan | Unionist Party |
| 65 | 57 | Fazilka | Akbar Ali | Unionist Party |
| 66 | 58 | Lahore South | Muzaffar Ali Khan Qizilibash | Unionist Party |
| 67 | 59 | Chunian | Muhammad Husain | Unionist Party |
| 68 | 60 | Kasur | Iftik Haruddin | Indian National Congress |
| 69 | 61 | Amritsar | Maqbul Mahmud | Unionist Party |
| 70 | 62 | Tarn Taran | Faqir Hussain Khan | Unionist Party |
| 71 | 63 | Ajanala | Fazl Din | Unionist Party |
| 72 | 64 | Gurdaspur East | Ali Akbar | Unionist Party |
| 73 | 65 | Batala | Badar Mohy-ud-din Qadri | Unionist Party |
| 74 | 66 | Shakargarh | Abdur Rahim | Unionist Party |
| 75 | 67 | Sialkot North | Shahab-ud-din | Unionist Party |
| 76 | 68 | Sialkot Center | Ghulam Rasul Cheema | Unionist Party |
| 77 | 69 | Sialkot South | Shahab-ud-din Virk | Unionist Party |
| 78 | 70 | Gujranwala North | Nasiruddin Chatha | Unionist Party |
| 79 | 71 | Gujranwala East | Husain Bhinder | Unionist Party |
| 80 | 72 | Hafizabad | Riasat Ali Chatha | Unionist Party |
| 81 | 73 | Sheikhupura | Ghulam Mohyuddin Qasuri | Unionist Party |
| 82 | 74 | Nankana Sahib | Karamat Ali | Unionist Party |
| 83 | 75 | Shahdara | Afzal Ali Shah Hasni | Unionist Party |
| 84 | 76 | Gujarat North | Fateh Mohammed | Unionist Party |
| 85 | 77 | Gujarat East | Fazal Ali Khan | Unionist Party |
| 86 | 78 | South-Eastern Gujarat | Muhammad khan | Unionist Party |
| 87 | 79 | Gujarat West | Irshadullah Ranjha | Unionist Party |
| 88 | 80 | South-Western Gujarat | Muhammad Ashraf Warraich | Unionist Party |
| 89 | 81 | Shahpur | Allah Baksh Khan Tiwana | Unionist Party |
| 90 | 82 | Khushab | Malik Khizar Hayat Tiwana | Unionist Party |
| 91 | 83 | Bhalwal | Umar Hayat Khan | Unionist Party |
| 92 | 84 | Sargodha | Habibullah Khan Tiwana | Unionist Party |
| 93 | 85 | Jehlum | Mohammed Khan Akram | Unionist Party |
| 94 | 86 | Pind Dadan Khan | Gazanfar Ali Khan | All-India Muslim League |
| 95 | 87 | Chakwal | Raja Muhammad Sarfraz Ali Khan | Unionist Party |
| 96 | 88 | Rawalpindi Sadar | Yusuf Khan | Unionist Party |
| 97 | 89 | Gujar Khan | Farman Ali Khan | Unionist Party |
| 98 | 90 | Rawalpindi East | Raja Fateh Khan | Unionist Party |
| 99 | 91 | Attock North | Muzaffar Khan | Unionist Party |
| 100 | 92 | Attock Central | Mohammed Nawaz Khan | Unionist Party |
| 101 | 93 | Attock South | Mohyuddin Lal Badshah | Unionist Party |
| 102 | 94 | Mianwali North | Gulam Qadir Khan | Unionist Party |
| 103 | 95 | Mianwali South | Muzaffar Khan | Unionist Party |
| 104 | 96 | Montgomery | Fateh Sher Khan Langrial | Unionist Party |
| 105 | 97 | Okara | Jehangir Khan | Unionist Party |
| 106 | 98 | Dipalpur | Nur Ahmed Maneka | Unionist Party |
| 107 | 99 | Pakpattan | Sultan Ahmed Hotiana | Unionist Party |
| 108 | 100 | Lyallpur | Mohammed Nurullah | Unionist Party |
| 109 | 101 | Samunduri | Sadat Ali Khan | Unionist Party |
| 110 | 102 | Toba Tek Singh | Nasir-ud-din Shah | Unionist Party |
| 111 | 103 | Jaranwal | Rai Shahadat Ali Khan | Unionist Party |
| 112 | 104 | Jhang East | Nawazish Ali Khan | Unionist Party |
| 113 | 105 | Jhang Central | Mubarak Ali Shah | Unionist Party |
| 114 | 106 | Jhang West | Talib Hussain Khan | Unionist Party |
| 115 | 107 | Multan | Ashiq Hussain Qureshi | Unionist Party |
| 116 | 108 | Shujabad | Raja Shah Gilani | Unionist Party |
| 117 | 109 | Lodhran | Vilayat Hussain Shah | Unionist Party |
| 118 | 110 | Mailsi | Ahmad Yar Khan Daultana | Unionist Party |
| 119 | 111 | Khanewal | Habit Khan Daha | Unionist Party |
| 120 | 112 | Kabirwala | Wali Mohammed Sial Hiraz | Unionist Party |
| 121 | 113 | Muzaffargarh Sadar | Fazl Karim Baksh Qureshi | Unionist Party |
| 122 | 114 | Alipur | Mohammed Hasan | Unionist Party |
| 123 | 115 | Muzaffargarh North | Mushtaq Ahmad Gurmani | Unionist Party |
| 124 | 116 | Dera Ghazi Khan North | Gulam Murtaza | Unionist Party |
| 125 | 117 | Dera Ghazi Khan Central | Faiz Mohammed | Unionist Party |
| 126 | 118 | Dera Ghazi Khan South | Khan Bahadur Sardar Hassan Khan Gurchani | Unionist Party |

Sikh Urban

| S. No. | Cons. No. | Constituency | Winner | Party |
|---|---|---|---|---|
| 127 | 119 | Eastern Towns | Santokh Singh | Khalsa National Party |
| 128 | 120 | Western Towns | Ujjal Singh | Khalsa National Party |

Sikh Rural

| S. No. | Cons. No. | Constituency | Winner | Party |
|---|---|---|---|---|
| 129 | 121 | South-Eastern Punjab | Narotam Singh | Shiromani Akali Dal |
| 130 | 122 | Ambala North | Baldev Singh | Shiromani Akali Dal |
| 131 | 123 | Kangara North-Hoshiarpur | Hari Singh | Shiromani Akali Dal |
| 132 | 124 | Hoshiarpur South | Harjap Singh Bains | Indian National Congress |
| 133 | 125 | Jullundur West | Gurbachan Singh | Khalsa National Party |
| 134 | 126 | Jullundur East | Kabul Singh | Indian National Congress |
| 135 | 127 | Ludhiana East | Kapur Singh | Independent |
| 136 | 128 | Ludhiana Central | Lal Singh Kamla | Unionist Party |
| 137 | 129 | Jagraon | Dasaundha Singh | Khalsa National Party |
| 138 | 130 | Ferozpur North | Sodhi Harnam Singh | Khalsa National Party |
| 139 | 131 | Ferozpur East | Rur Singh | Indian National Congress |
| 140 | 132 | Ferozpur West | Pritam Singh Sidhu | Independent |
| 141 | 133 | Ferozpur South | Tara Singh | Shiromani Akali Dal |
| 142 | 134 | Lahore West | Tehja Singh | Indian National Congress |
| 143 | 135 | Kasur | Chanan Singh | Shiromani Akali Dal |
| 144 | 136 | Amritsar North | Sohan Singh Josh | Unionist Party |
| 145 | 137 | Amritsar Central | Basakha Singh | Khalsa National Party |
| 146 | 138 | Amritsar South | Partap Singh Kairon | Shiromani Akali Dal |
| 147 | 139 | Gurdaspur North | Inder Singh | Khalsa National Party |
| 148 | 140 | Batala | Sundar Singh Majithia | Khalsa National Party |
| 149 | 141 | Sialkot | Balwant Singh | Independent |
| 150 | 142 | Gujranwala-Shahadara | Joginder Singh | Khalsa National Party |
| 151 | 143 | Sheikhupura West | Naunihal Singh Mann | Khalsa National Party |
| 152 | 144 | Gujarat Shahpur | Prem Singh | Shiromani Akali Dal |
| 153 | 145 | North-Western Punjab | Uttam Singh Duggal | Khalsa National Party |
| 154 | 146 | Montgomery East | Jagjit Singh Bedi | Shiromani Akali Dal |
| 155 | 147 | Lyallpur West | Sampuran Singh | Shiromani Akali Dal |
| 156 | 148 | Lyallpur East | Giani Kartar Singh | Shiromani Akali Dal |
| 157 | 149 | South-Western Punjab | Ajit Singh | Khalsa National Party |

Special

| S. No | Cons. No. | Constituency | Winner | Party |
Women
| 158 | 150 | Lahore City (General) | Parbhati Devi | Indian National Congress |
| 159 | 151 | Inner Lahore (Muhammadan) | Rashida Latif | Independent |
| 160 | 152 | Outer Lahore (Muhammadan) | Jahanara Shah Nawaz | Independent |
| 161 | 153 | Amritsar South (Sikh) | Raghbir Kaur | Shiromani Akali Dal |
Anglo-Indian
| 162 | 154 | Punjab Anglo-Indian | E. Few | Independent |
European
| 163 | 155 | European | William Roberts | Independent |
Indian Christian
| 164 | 156 | East-Central Punjab | S. P. Singha | Unionist Party |
| 165 | 157 | West-Central Punjab | Jalal-ud-din Amber | Unionist Party |
Commerce and Industry
| 166 | 158 | Punjab Commerce and Industry | Binda Saran | Independent |
Landholders
| 167 | 159 | Eastern Punjab (General) | Raja Narender Nath | Hindu Election Board |
| 168 | 160 | Central Punjab (Sikh) | Jagjit Singh | Khalsa National Party |
| 169 | 161 | Northern Punjab (Muhammadan) | Sikandar Hayat Khan | Unionist Party |
| 170 | 162 | Western Punjab (Muhammadan) | Hayat Khan Noon | Unionist Party |
| 171 | 163 | Baluch Tumandars (Muhammadan) | Jamal Khan Leghari | Unionist Party |
Trade and Labour Unions
| 172 | 164 | Punjab Trade and Labour Unions | Sita Ram | Hindu Election Board |
| 173 | 165 | Eastern Punjab | Diwan Chaman Lall | Indian National Congress |
| 174 | 166 | Northern Punjab | Ahmad Baksh Khan | Unionist Party |
University
| 175 | 167 | Punjab Universities | Manohar Lal | Independent |

== Government formation ==
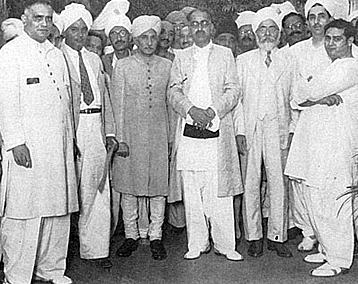
(Right to Left) Amjad Ali Khan (member), Malik Khizar Hayat Tiwana (minister), Dasaundha Singh (member), Sikandar Hayat Khan (prime minister), Chottu Ram (minister), Mian Abdul Haye (minister) in 1940.

After the result Unionist party got majority in the assembly on its own. Unionist Party leader Sikandar Hayat Khan claimed the formation of Government in the State. Khalsa National Board and Hindu Election Board also joined the government.

On 5 April 1937 Sikandar Hayat Khan formed the Government and 5 other members also took oath. The ministers and their ministries were as follows:-

| Name | Ministry | Party | Constituency |
|---|---|---|---|
| Sikandar Hayat Khan | Prime minister and Law and order | UoP | North Punjab (Landholders) (Mohammadans) |
| Chottu Ram | Revenue and Irrigation | UoP | Jhajjat (General-Urban) |
| Mnohar Lal | Finance and Industry | IND | Punjab Universities |
| Malik Khizar Hayat Tiwana | Electricity, Police and Local governments | UoP | Khushab (Muhammadans-Rural) |
| Sundar Singh Majithia | Development | KNP | Batala (Sikh-Rural) |
| Mian Abdul Hayee | Education and Health | UoP | South East Town (Muhammadans-Urban) |

On 2 April 1941 after the death of Sundar Singh Majithia, the ministry of Development was handed over to Dasaundha Singh (KNP) from Jagraon (Sikh-Rural) constituency. In 1942 after Sikandar-Baldev Pact KNP leader and minister Dasaundha Singh was removed from the cabinet and Baldev Singh joined the cabinet.

On 26 December 1945 Sikandar Hayat Khan died due to a heart attack. Malik Khizar Hayat Tiwana succeeded him on 30 December 1945.
