= Legislatures of British India =

Legislative bodies in the presidencies and provinces of British India (1861–1947)

Flag of British India

The Legislatures of British India included legislative bodies in the presidencies and provinces of British India, the Imperial Legislative Council, the Chamber of Princes and the Central Legislative Assembly. The legislatures were created under Acts of Parliament of the United Kingdom. Initially serving as small advisory councils, the legislatures evolved into partially elected bodies, but were never elected through suffrage. Provincial legislatures saw boycotts during the period of dyarchy between 1919 and 1935. After reforms and elections in 1937, the largest parties in provincial legislatures formed governments headed by a prime minister. A few British Indian subjects were elected to the Parliament of the United Kingdom, which had superior powers than colonial legislatures. British Indian legislatures did not include Burma's legislative assembly after 1937, the State Council of Ceylon nor the legislative bodies of princely states.

== Advisory councils (1861–1919) ==
Legislative councils were first formed in each province under the Indian Councils Act 1861. Members would include nominees of the Lieutenant Governor who had to receive consent from the governor general of India. Native Indian subjects were a minority in the early councils, which were dominated by Europeans and Anglo-Indians. The Lieutenant Governor could nominate a maximum of 12 members to these councils, which did not have fixed term limits. The councils were merely advisory bodies for the provincial governments.

Under the Indian Councils Act 1892, the legislative councils expanded to 20 members. The councils were empowered to address questions to the executive and discuss budgets without voting. The Lieutenant Governor would nominate 7 members from the recommendations of universities, city corporations, municipalities, district boards and chambers of commerce. The majority of councilors continued to be European and a minority were Indian.

The Morley–Minto reforms were the brainchild of John Morley, the Secretary of State for India, and Earl Minto, the Viceroy of India. The reforms were enacted under the Indian Councils Act 1909, which brought amendments to the acts of 1861 and 1892. However, they did not go as far as the demands for home rule put forward by the Indian National Congress. Colonial administrators were not keen to grant parliamentary powers to India, possibly for fear of subversion. Britain was also a unitary state and little power was given its regional or colonial units. Under the Indian Councils Act 1909, the number of seats in legislative councils were expanded. Councils were established at the central level and for gubernatorial provinces. Under the reforms, the majority of councilors would be elected and a minority would be nominated from the government. Property owners, including the zamindars, became voters. Muslims were given the status of a "separate electorate". The act increased the powers of legislative council to discuss budgets, suggest amendments and vote on limited matters. Representatives from plantations, commercial chambers, universities and landholders were given seats in the assembly. Education, local government, public health, public works, agriculture and cooperative societies were made "transferred subjects" to be administered by the elected representatives. The "reserved subjects" were to be administered by the Executive Council. Reserved subjects included finance, police, land revenue, law, justice and labour.

== Dyarchy (1919–1935) ==
A dyarchy is a system of shared government. In British India, the British government decided to share responsibilities with legislative councils in major provinces.

As a result of Montagu–Chelmsford Reforms, the British government decided to gradually grant self-governing institutions to India. The Government of India Act 1919 established a bicameral central legislature and granted revenue shares to provincial legislative councils. The British government elaborated that the system would continue for at least 10 years until a review. The Swaraj Party and Congress Party, which enjoyed majorities in the councils, boycotted the dyarchy- arguing that the reforms once again did not go far enough. The Congress increased its non-cooperation movement. However, constitutionalists in parties like the All India Muslim League continued to advocate their constituents' interests within the councils.

The Rowlatt Act, Amritsar massacre and Khilafat movement worsened the political situation. In 1928, the Nehru Report called for a federal democracy. In 1929, the Fourteen Points of Jinnah demanded electoral, administrative and political reform. The Simon Commission was formed to explore constitutional reform.

In 1932, the "Communal Award" was announced by British Prime Minister Ramsay MacDonald granting separate electorates to Muslims, Sikhs, Indian Christians, Anglo-Indians, Europeans and Depressed Classes (now known as the Dalits) instead of equal universal franchise. The principle of weightage was also applied.

The award was highly controversial and criticized as a divide and rule policy. The British government opined that it wanted to avoid civil war.

== Provincial autonomy (1937–1947) ==
The Government of India Act 1935 ended dyarchy in the provinces and increased autonomy. Six provinces were given bicameral legislatures. Elections based on separate electorates were held in 1937 and 1946, leading to the formation of provincial ministries (governments) led by a Prime Minister.

Most of the provincial governments were unstable amid the outbreak of World War II, the Bengal famine of 1943 and the Quit India movement.

== Legislative councils (1861–1947) ==
British Imperial Territory	Legislative Council	Modern location
Assam	Assam Legislative Council	Bangladesh, India
Bengal	Bengal Legislative Council	Bangladesh, India
Bihar and Orissa	Bihar and Orissa Legislative Council	India
Bombay	Bombay Legislative Council	India
Burma	Burma Legislative Council	Myanmar
Central Provinces	Central Provinces Legislative Council	India
Coorg	Coorg Legislative Council	India
Eastern Bengal and Assam	Eastern Bengal and Assam Legislative Council	Bangladesh, India
Madras	Madras Legislative Council	India
North-West Frontier	North-West Frontier Legislative Council	Pakistan
Punjab	Punjab Legislative Council	Pakistan, India
United Provinces	United Provinces Legislative Council	India
British Indian Empire	Imperial Legislative Council	Bangladesh, India, Pakistan, Myanmar

== Legislative assemblies (1937–1947) ==
British Imperial Territory	Legislative Assembly	Seats	Modern Location
Assam	Assam Legislative Assembly	108	Bangladesh, India
Bengal	Bengal Legislative Assembly	250	Bangladesh, India
Bihar	Bihar Legislative Assembly	152	India
Bombay	Bombay Legislative Assembly	175	India
Central Provinces	Central Provinces Legislative Assembly	112	India
Madras	Madras Legislative Assembly	215	India
North-West Frontier	North-West Frontier Legislative Assembly	50	Pakistan
Orissa	Orissa Legislative Assembly	60	India
Punjab	Punjab Legislative Assembly	175	Pakistan, India
Sind	Sind Legislative Assembly	60	Pakistan
United Provinces	United Provinces Legislative Assembly	228	India
British Indian Empire	Central Legislative Assembly	145	Bangladesh, India, Pakistan

=== List of provincial prime ministers (1937–1947) ===
Office	Name
Prime Minister of Assam	1. Muhammed Saadulah; 2. Gopinath Bordoloi
Prime Minister of Bengal	1. A. K. Fazlul Huq; 2. Sir Khawaja Nazimuddin; 3. Huseyn Shaheed Suhrawardy
Prime Minister of Bihar	1. Muhammad Yunus; 2. Sri Krishna Sinha
Prime Minister of Bombay	1. Sir Dhanjishah Cooper; 2. B. G. Kher
Prime Minister of the Central Provinces	1. N. B. Khare; 2. Ravishankar Shukla
Prime Minister of Madras	1. C. Rajagopalachari; 2. Tanguturi Prakasam; 3. O. P. Ramaswamy Reddiyar
Prime Minister of North-West Frontier	1. Sir Sahibzada Abdul Qayyum; 2. Khan Abdul Jabbar Khan
Prime Minister of Orissa	1. Krushna Chandra Gajapati; 2. Bishwanath Das; 3. Harekrushna Mahatab
Prime Minister of Punjab	1. Sir Sikandar Hayat Khan; 2. Malik Khizar Hayat Tiwana
Prime Minister of Sind	1. Ghulam Hussain Hidayatullah; 2. Allah Bux Soomro; 3. Mir Bandeh Ali Khan Talpur
Prime Minister of the United Provinces	1. Sir Muhammad Ahmad Said Khan Chhatari; 2. Govind Ballabh Pant

== British Indian MPs in Westminster ==
A number of British Indians and Anglo-Indians were elected to the British parliament, particularly from the Parsi and Jewish communities. They included Dadabhai Naoroji, Mancherjee Bhownagree, Shapurji Saklatvala, Philip Sassoon and Ernest Soares.

== Chamber of Princes ==
The Chamber of Princes was established by a proclamation of King George V in 1920. It was a forum for the rulers of princely states to air their views and engage with the colonial government. It was housed in the Parliament House and its meetings were presided over by the Viceroy of India.

== Successors and legacy ==
Prior to the Partition of India, the imperial legislature was succeeded by the Constituent Assembly of India, from which the Interim Government of India headed by the Viceroy of India chose ministers in 1946. In the Dominion of Pakistan, the Constituent Assembly of Pakistan succeeded the Indian assembly in 1947. In the provinces of both India and Pakistan, pre-partition assemblies continued to function. The assemblies of Bengal and Punjab were divided between the newly formed sub-national units of East Bengal, West Bengal, East Punjab and West Punjab. The Parliament of India was established in 1952. The Parliament of Pakistan was established in 1956. In 1971, secessionist Bengali legislators in East Pakistan formed the Constituent Assembly of Bangladesh; and the Parliament of Bangladesh was established in 1972.

The legislatures of colonial British India were precursors to modern parliamentary democracy in the Indian subcontinent. The notion of parliamentary sovereignty took root in the subcontinent after independence, but has faced many challenges. President's rule is often imposed in Indian states to dismiss legislatures. India underwent a period of emergency rule between 1975 and 1977. Pakistan has seen martial law and military rule between 1958 and 1962, 1969–1973, 1977-1985 and 1999–2002. Bangladesh underwent presidential rule, martial law and semi-presidential government between 1975 and 1990; while emergency rule was imposed between 2007 and 2008.

Today, the federal Republic of India and its 28 states and 8 Union Territories; the federal republic of Pakistan and its four provinces and two autonomous territories; and the unitary republic of Bangladesh; all have parliamentary governments, largely derived from the Westminster system.

== See also ==
- South Asia
- British Raj
- Imperial Legislative Council
- State Legislature of India
- List of legislatures by country
