= Elections in Punjab, India =

Overview of the procedure of elections in the Indian state of Punjab

Elections in Punjab, a state in India are conducted in accordance with the Constitution of India. The Assembly of Punjab creates laws regarding the conduct of local body elections unilaterally while any changes by the state legislature to the conduct of state level elections need to be approved by the Parliament of India. In addition, the state legislature may be dismissed by the Parliament according to Article 356 of the Indian Constitution and President's rule may be imposed.

== Political parties ==
National parties

- Bharatiya Janata Party
- Indian National Congress
- Communist Party of India (Marxist)
- Bahujan Samaj Party
- Aam Aadmi Party

State parties

- Shiromani Akali Dal
- Communist Party of India

Registered unrecognized parties

- Shiromani Akali Dal (Sanyukt)

== Lok Sabha elections ==
Lok Sabha	Election Year	1st Party	2nd Party	3rd Party	4th Party	Others	Total Seats
1st Lok Sabha	1951-52	INC 16				Ind 2	18
2nd Lok Sabha	1957	INC 21	CPI 1			–	22
3rd Lok Sabha	1962	INC 17	BJS 3	AD 1	SP 1	HLS 1	17
4th Lok Sabha	1967	INC 9	AD(SF) 3	BJS 1		–	13
5th Lok Sabha	1971	INC(R) 10	CPI 2			Ind 1	13
6th Lok Sabha	1977	AD 7	JP 3	SAD 2	CPI(M) 1	–	13
7th Lok Sabha	1980	INC(I) 12	SAD 1			–	13
8th Lok Sabha	1984	INC 6	AD 6	SAD 1		–	13
9th Lok Sabha	1989	SAD(A) 7	INC 1	JD 1	BJP 1	BSP 1, Ind 2	13
10th Lok Sabha	1991	INC 12	BSP 1			–	13
11th Lok Sabha	1996	SAD 8	BSP 3	INC 2		–	13
12th Lok Sabha	1998	SAD 8	BJP 3	JD 1		Ind 1	13
13th Lok Sabha	1999	INC 8	SAD 2	BJP 1	CPI 1	SAD(A) 1	13
14th Lok Sabha	2004	SAD 8	BJP 3	INC 2		–	13
15th Lok Sabha	2009	INC 8	SAD 4	BJP 1		–	13
16th Lok Sabha	2014	SAD 4	AAP 4	INC 3	BJP 2	–	13
17th Lok Sabha	2019	INC 8	SAD 2	BJP 2	AAP 1	–	13
18th Lok Sabha	2024	INC 7	AAP 3	SAD 1		Ind 2	13

Year	Lok Sabha Election	Winning Party/Coalition
1951	First Lok Sabha	Indian National Congress
1957	Second Lok Sabha	Indian National Congress
1962	Third Lok Sabha	Indian National Congress
1967	Fourth Lok Sabha	Indian National Congress
1971	Fifth Lok Sabha	Indian National Congress
1977	Sixth Lok Sabha	Janata alliance (SAD, BLD, CPI(M)) : 13 seats out of 13
1980	Seventh Lok Sabha	Indian National Congress
1984	Eighth Lok Sabha	Indian National Congress
1989	Ninth Lok Sabha	National Front (Akali (M) - 6/13), Cong : 2, Janata : 1, BSP : 1, Independents : 3
1991	Tenth Lok Sabha	No elections in May 1991 due to unrest, but elections were held for all seats at a later date (probably 1992 with assembly polls).
1996	Eleventh Lok Sabha	Shiromani Akali Dal - 8 of 13, Congress - 2, BSP : 3.
1998	Twelfth Lok Sabha	National Democratic Alliance (SAD, BJP)
1999	Thirteenth Lok Sabha	Indian National Congress
2004	Fourteenth Lok Sabha	National Democratic Alliance (SAD, BJP)
2009	Fifteenth Lok Sabha	United Progressive Alliance (Indian National Congress)
2014	Sixteenth Lok Sabha	National Democratic Alliance (SAD, BJP) : 6/13, AAP : 4, Congress: 3
2019	Seventeenth Lok Sabha	Indian National Congress (8/13), AAP - 1, Akali + BJP = 2+2 .
2024	Eighteenth Lok Sabha	INC (7/13), AAP: 3, SAD : 1, IND: 2

=== Maps ===
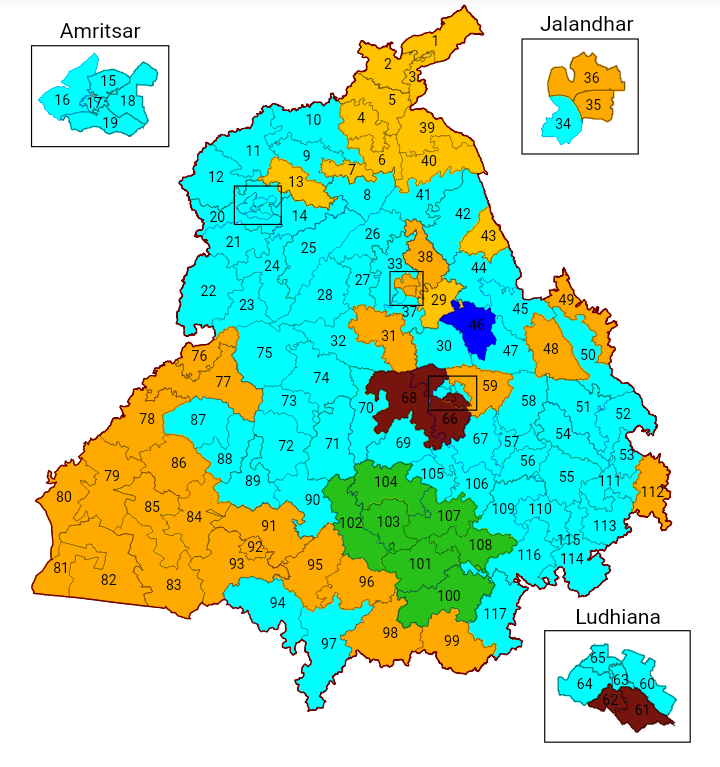
Lok Sabha Elections	Assembly segments wise lead
2009 Lok Sabha Elections	2009 Assembly Segments Lead
2014 Lok Sabha Elections	2014 Assembly Segments Lead
2019 Lok Sabha Elections	2019 Assembly segments Lead
2024 Lok Sabha Elections	2024 Assembly segments lead

== Vidhan Sabha Elections ==
=== Pre-Independence ===
Year	UoP	INC	SAD	AIML	IND	Others	Total
1937	95	18	10	1	20	30	175
1946	20	51	22	73	7	2	175

=== Post-Independence ===
==== United Punjab ====
United Punjab (Punjab, Haryana, Himachal and Chandigarh)
Years	INC	SAD	CPI	IND	Others	Total
1952	96	13	4	9	4	126
1957	120	^	6	13	21	154
1962	90	16	12	18	18	154

==== After Punjab Reorganisation Act, 1966 ====
Punjab
Years	INC	SAD	CPI	CPI(M)	IND	Others	Total
1967	48	^	5	3	9	39	104
1969	38	43	4	2	4	17	104
1972	66	24	10	1	3	11	104
New Boundaries Reorganized Punjab
Years	SAD	INC	CPI	BJP	IND	Others	Total
1977	58	17	7	~	2	33	117
1980	37	63	9	1	2	5	117
1985	73	32	1	6	4	1	117
1992	^	87	4	6	4	16	117
1997	75	14	2	18	6	2	117
2002	41	62	2	3	9	0	117
2007	48	44	0	19	5	0	116
New Boundaries Reorganized
Years	INC	SAD	AAP	BJP	IND	Others	Total
2012	46	56	~	12	3	0	117
2017	77	15	20	3	0	2	117
2022	18	3	92	2	1	1	117
2027							117

- ^ - Party didn't contest election
- ~ - Party didn't exist
- - Green color box indicates the party/parties who formed the government

Next Punjab Legislative Assembly election is expected to be held in 2027.

=== Maps ===
Decade	Assembly Results Map
2010s	2012 Assembly results	2017 Assembly results
2020s	2022 Assembly results	2027 Assembly results

== See also ==
- Elections in Haryana, carved out of Punjab in 1966
- Elections in Himachal Pradesh, carved out of Punjab in 1966
- Elections in India, national elections
