= 1946 Punjab Legislative Assembly election =

Punjab Assembly Election of 1946

1946 Punjab Provincial Assembly election
- 1946

175 seats of the Punjab Provincial Assembly 88 seats needed for a majority
- Turnout: 61.16% (▼3.07%)
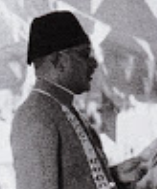

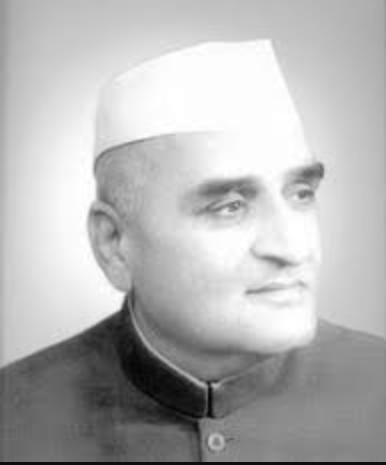

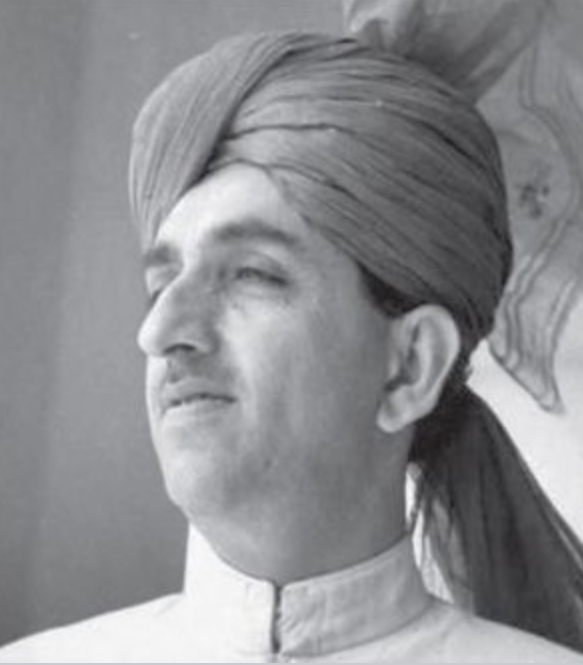

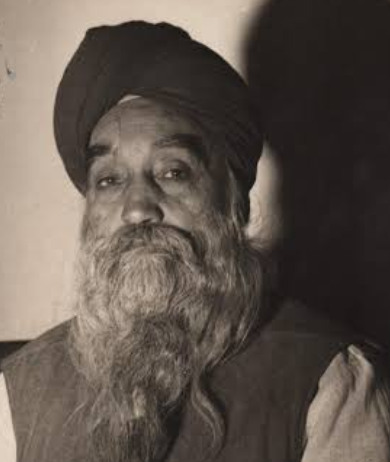
	First party	Second party
Leader	Iftikhar Hussain Khan Mamdot	Bhim Sen Sachar
Party	AIML	INC
Leader's seat	Ferozpur-Central (Muhammadan-Rural)	Lahore City (General-Urban)
Seats won	73	51
Seat change	▲71	▲33
Popular vote	680,823	477,765
Percentage	32.8%	23.1%
	Third party	Fourth party
Leader	Malik Khizar Hayat	Master Tara Singh
Party	Unionist	SAD
Leader's seat	Khushab (Muhammadans-Rural), Northern Punjab and Western Punjab (Muhammadan Landholders)	Ferozpur-South (Sikh-Rural)
Seats won	21	20
Seat change	79	▲10
Popular vote	419,231	160,763
Percentage	20.2%	7.8%
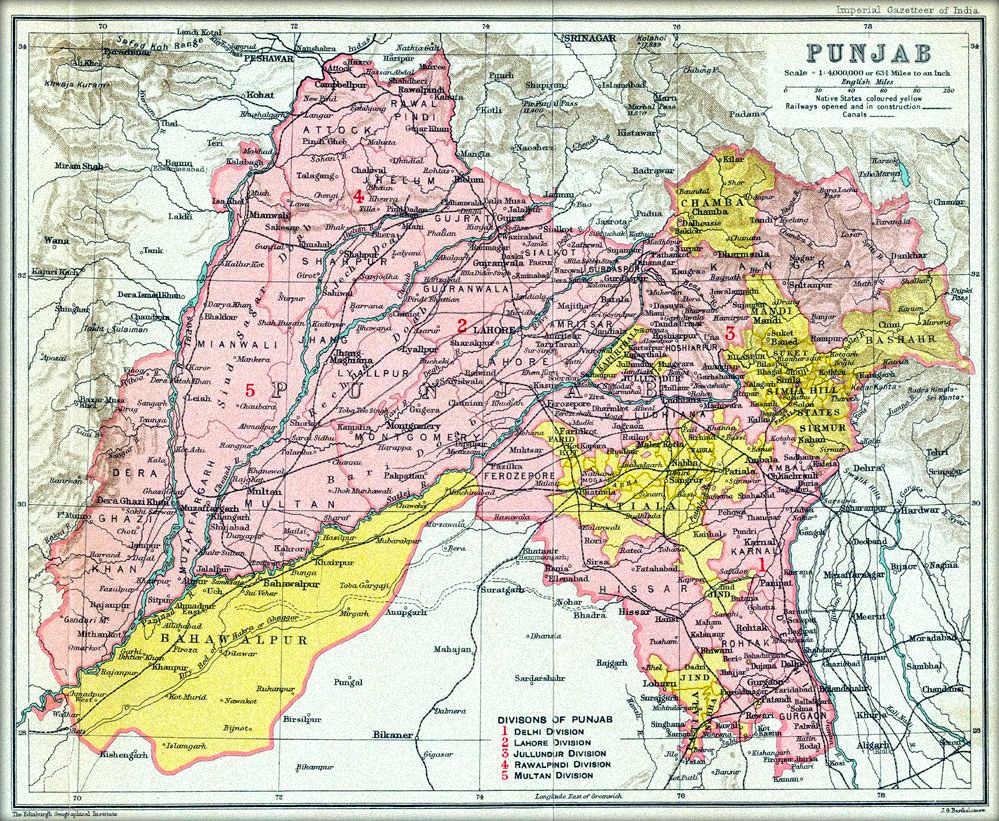
Premier before election
Governor Rule
-
Elected Premier
Malik Khizar Hayat Tiwana
Unionist

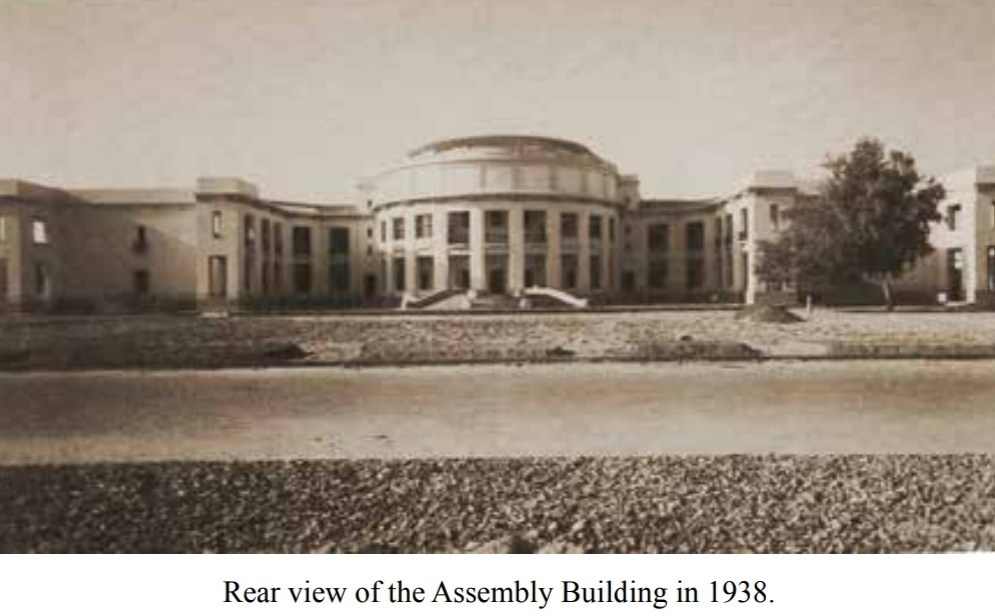
Punjab Assembly building in Lahore 1938.

Elections to the Punjab Provincial Assembly were held in January 1946 as part of the 1946 Indian provincial elections.

== Campaign ==
The Unionist Party contested the election under the leadership of Malik Khizar Hayat Tiwana but the party stood at fourth place. To stop the Muslim League to form the government in Punjab Indian National Congress and Shiromani Akali Dal extended their support to Unionist Party. Malik Khizar Hayat Tiwana resigned on 2 March 1947 against the decision of Partition of India.

The Punjab province was a key battleground in the 1946 Indian provincial elections. The Punjab had a slight Muslim majority, and local politics had been dominated by the secular Unionist Party and its longtime leader Sir Sikandar Hayat Khan. The Unionists had built a formidable power base in the Punjabi countryside through policies of patronage allowing them to retain the loyalty of landlords and pirs who exerted significant local influence. For the Muslim League to claim to represent the Muslim vote, they would need to win over the majority of the seats held by the Unionists. Following the death of Sir Sikander in 1942, and bidding to overcome their dismal showing in the elections of 1937, the Muslim League intensified campaigning throughout rural and urban Punjab.

A major thrust of the Muslim's League's campaign was the increased use of religious symbolism. Activists were advised to join in communal prayers when visiting villages, and gain permission to hold meetings after the Friday prayers. The Quran became a symbol of the Muslim League at rallies, and pledges to vote were made on it. Students, a key component of the Muslim League's activists, were trained to appeal to the electorate on communal lines, and at the peak of student activity during the Christmas holidays of 1945, 250 students from Aligarh were invited to campaign in the province along with 1550 members of the Punjab Muslim Student's Federation. A key achievement of their religious propaganda came in enticing Muslim Jats and Gujjars from their intercommunal tribal loyalties. In response, the Unionists attempted to counter the growing religious appeal of the Muslim League by introducing religious symbolism into their own campaign, but with no student activists to rely upon and dwindling support amongst the landlords, their attempts met with little success.

To further their religious appeal, the Muslim League also launched efforts to entice Pirs towards their cause. Pirs dominated the religious landscape, and were individuals who claimed to inherit religious authority from Sufi Saints who had proselytised in the region since the eleventh century. By the twentieth century, most Punjabi Muslims offered allegiance to a Pir as their religious guide, thus providing them considerable political influence. The Unionists had successfully cultivated the support of Pirs to achieve success in the 1937 elections, and the Muslim League now attempted to replicate their method of doing so. To do so, the Muslim League created the Masheikh Committee, used Urs ceremonies and shrines for meetings and rallies and encouraged fatwas urging support for the Muslim League. Reasons for the pirs switching allegiance varied. For the Gilani Pirs of Multan the over-riding factor was local longstanding factional rivalries, whilst for many others a shrines size and relationship with the government dictated its allegiance.

Despite the Muslim League's aim to foster a united Muslim loyalty, it also recognised the need to better exploit the biradari network and appeal to primordial tribal loyalties. In 1946 it held a special Gujjar conference intending to appeal to all Muslim Gujjars, and lifted its ban on Jahanara Shahnawaz with the hope of appealing to Arain constituencies. Appealing to biradari ties enabled the Muslim League to accelerate support amongst landlords, and in turn use the landlords client-patron economic relationship with their tenants to guarantee votes for the forthcoming election.

A separate strategy of the Muslim League was to exploit the economic slump suffered in the Punjab as a result of the Second World War. The Punjab had supplied 27 per cent of the Indian Army recruits during the war, constituting 800,000 men, and representing a significant part of the electorate. By 1946, less than 20 per cent of those servicemen returning home had found employment. This in part was exacerbated by the speedy end to the war in Asia, which caught the Unionist's by surprise, and meant their plans to deploy servicemen to work in canal colonies were not yet ready. The Muslim League took advantage of this weakness and followed Congress's example of providing work to servicemen within its organisation. The Muslim League's ability to offer an alternative to the Unionist government, namely the promise of Pakistan as an answer to the economic dislocation suffered by Punjabi villagers, was identified as a key issue for the election.

On the eve of the elections, the political landscape in the Punjab was finely poised, and the Muslim League offered a credible alternative to the Unionist Party. The transformation itself had been rapid, as most landlords and pirs had not switched allegiance until after 1944. The breakdown of talks between the Punjab Premier, Malik Khizar Hayat Tiwana and Muhammad Ali Jinnah in late 1944 had meant many Muslims were now forced to choose between the two parties at the forthcoming election. A further blow for the Unionists came with death of its leading statesman Sir Chhotu Ram in early 1945.

== Distribution of seats ==
All 175 constituencies were reserved on the basis of religion. It was as follows:-

Constituency Type	Urban	Rural	Total
Non-Muhammadan	8	34	42
Muhammadans	9	75	84
Sikhs	2	29	31
Special^	-	-	18
Total	19	138	175

^Special constituencies (non-territory constituency) were further divided into Categories and sub-categories as follow:-

- Women - 4
  - Non-Muhammadan - 1
  - Mohammadans - 2
  - Sikhs - 1
- European - 1
- Anglo-Indian - 1
- Indian Christian - 2
- Punjab Commerce and Industry - 1
- Landholders - 5
  - Non-Muhammadan - 1
  - Mohammadans - 3
  - Sikhs - 1
- Trade and Labour Unions - 3
- University - 1

== Voter Statistics ==
- Total Electorate = 3,550,212
- Total Voters = 2,073,336
- Vote Turnout = 61.16%
- Total Voters in Territorial Constituencies = 33,87,283
  - Highest No. of Voters - 52,009 in Ludhiana-Ferozpur (General-Rural)
  - Lowest No. of Voters = 3,210 in Tarn Taran (Muhammadan-Rural)
  - Highest Turnout = 77.56% in Shahpur (Muhammadan-Rural)
  - Lowest Turnout = 5.48% in Amritsar City (General-Urban)
- Total Voters in Non-Territorial Constituencies = 1,62,929
  - Highest No. of Voters = 70,708 in Amritsar (Women-Sikh)
  - Lowest No. of Voters = 9 in Baluch Tumandars (Landholders)
  - Highest Turnout = 97.45% in Punjab (Commerce and Industry)
  - Lowest Turnout = 16.69% in European

== Election schedule ==
Event	Date
Filing of Nominations	12 December 1945
Scrutiny of Nominations	15 December 1945
Polling	1 January 1946
Counting	15 February 1946

== Results ==

The Result of election was as follow:-

Party	Seats won	Change	Votes
All-India Muslim League	73	▲71	680,823
Indian National Congress	51	▲33	477,765
Unionist Party	21	▼79	419,231
Shiromani Akali Dal	20	▲10	160,763
Communist Party of India	0	-	39,516
Independent	10	▼05	295,238
Others	0	▼30	295,238
Total	175		2,073,336

== Category wise result ==
S. No.	Party	Category (Seats)							
S. No.	Party	General Urban (8)	General Rural (34)	Muhammadans Urban (9)	Muhammadans Rural (75)	Sikh Urban (2)	Sikh Rural (29)	Special (18)	Total (175)
1	All-India Muslim League	-	-	9	62	-	-	2	73
2	Indian National Congress	8	27	-	1	1	7	7	51
3	Shiromani Akali Dal	-	-	-	-	1	19	1	21
4	Unionist Party	-	5	-	10	-	-	4	19
5	Independent	-	2	-	2	-	3	4	11

== Constituency wise result ==
Color key for the Party of Candidates

- All-India Muslim League
- Indian National Congress
- Shiromani Akali Dal
- Unionist Party
- Independent

Other color keys

- Candidate Elected Unopposed
- Constituency reserved for Schedule Caste

General Urban

S. No.	Cons. No.	Constituency	Winner	Party
1	1	Southern Towns	Shri Ram Sharma	Indian National Congress
2	2	South-Eastern Towns	Shanno Devi	Indian National Congress
3	3	Eastern Towns	Sudarshan Seth	Indian National Congress
4	4	Lahore City	Bhim Sen Sachar	Indian National Congress
5	5	Amritsar City	Sant Ram Seth	Indian National Congress
6	6	North-Eastern Towns	Krishan Gopal Dutt	Indian National Congress
7	7	North-Western Towns	Chaman Lal	Indian National Congress
8	8	South-Western Towns	Harihar Lal	Indian National Congress

General Rural

S. No.	Cons. No.	Constituency	Winner	Party
9	9	Hissar South	Ranjit Singh	Indian National Congress
10	10	Hansi	Suraj Mal	Unionist Party
11	11	Hissar North	Sahib Ram	Indian National Congress
12	12	Rohtak North	Lahri Singh	Indian National Congress
13	13	Rohtak Central	Badlu Ram	Indian National Congress
14	14	Jhajjar	Sher Singh	Indian National Congress
15	15	North-western Gurgaon	Manohar Singh	Unionist Party
16	16	South-Eastern Gurgaon	Prem Singh	Unionist Party
17	16	South-Eastern Gurgaon	Jiwan Lal	Indian National Congress
18	17	Karnal South	Chandan	Indian National Congress
19	18	Karnal North	Jagdish Chandar	Indian National Congress
20	18	Karnal North	Sundar Singh	Indian National Congress
21	19	Ambala-Simla	Ratan Singh	Indian National Congress
22	19	Ambala-Simla	Priti Singh Azad	Independent
23	20	Kangra; North	Pancham Chand	Indian National Congress
24	21	Kangra South	Dalip Singh	Indian National Congress
25	22	Kangra East	Bali Ram	Indian National Congress
26	23	Kangra West	Bhagat Ram Sharma	Indian National Congress
27	24	Hoshiarpur West	Mangu Ram Muggowalia	Unionist Party
28	24	Hoshiarpur West	Mehar Chand	Indian National Congress
29	25	Una	Mohan Lal	Indian National Congress
30	26	Jullundhar	Sant Ram	Unionist Party
31	26	Jullundhar	Gurbanta Singh	Indian National Congress
32	27	Ludhiana-Ferozpur	Matu Ram	Indian National Congress
33	27	Ludhiana-Ferozpur	Ranbir Singh	Indian National Congress
34	28	Western Lahore	Fakir Chand	Indian National Congress
35	29	Amritsar-Sialkot	Kidar Nath Sehgal	Indian National Congress
36	29	Amritsar-Sialkot	Sundar Singh	Indian National Congress
37	30	Gurdaspur	Prabodh Chandra	Indian National Congress
38	31	Rawalpindi	Tilak Raj Chadha	Indian National Congress
39	32	South-Eastern Multan	Bihari Lal Chanana	Indian National Congress
40	33	Layallpur Jhang	Dev Raj Seth	Indian National Congress
41	33	Layallpur Jhang	Harbhajan Ram	Independent
42	34	West Multan	Virendra	Indian National Congress

Muhammadan Urban

S. No.	Cons. No.	Constituency	Winner	Party
43	35	Southern Towns	Gulam Samad	All-India Muslim League
44	36	South-Eastern Towns	Shaukat Hayat Khan	All-India Muslim League
45	37	Eastern Towns	Barkat Ali	All-India Muslim League
46	38	Inner Lahore	Wazir Mohammed	All-India Muslim League
47	39	Outer Lahore	Mohammed Rafiq	All-India Muslim League
48	40	Amritsar City	Abdul Kareem Chohan	All-India Muslim League
49	41	North-Eastern Towns	Karamat Ali	All-India Muslim League
50	42	Rawalpindi Towns	Firoz Khan Noon	All-India Muslim League
51	43	Multan Towns	Mohammed Amin	All-India Muslim League

Muhammadan Rural

S. No	Cons. No.	Constituency	Winner	Party
52	44	Hissar	Saheb daad Khan	All-India Muslim League
53	45	Rohtak	Khurshid Khan	All-India Muslim League
54	46	North-Western Gurgaon	Ahmad Jan	All-India Muslim League
55	47	South-Eastern Gurgaon	Mohtab Khan	All-India Muslim League
56	48	Karnal	Abdul Hamid Khan	All-India Muslim League
57	49	Ambala-Simla	Mohammed Hasan	All-India Muslim League
58	50	Kangra East-Hoshiarpur	Ali Akbar Khan	All-India Muslim League
59	51	Hoshiarpur West	Rana Nasrullah Khan	All-India Muslim League
60	52	Jullundur North	Abdus Salam Khan	All-India Muslim League
61	53	Jullundur South	Wali Mohammed Gohir	All-India Muslim League
62	54	Ludhiana	Iqbal Ahmed Khan	All-India Muslim League
63	55	Ferozpur Central	Iftikhar Hussain Khan Mamdot	All-India Muslim League
64	56	Ferozpur East	Bashir Ahmed	All-India Muslim League
65	57	Fazilka	Bagh Ali Sukera	All-India Muslim League
66	58	Lahore South	Muzaffar Ali Khan Qizilibash	All-India Muslim League
67	59	Chunian	Muhammad Husain	All-India Muslim League
68	60	Kasur	Iftikhar-ud-din	All-India Muslim League
69	61	Amritsar	Nasrullah Khan	All-India Muslim League
70	62	Tarn Taran	Akram Ali Khan	All-India Muslim League
71	63	Ajanala	Zafrullah Khan Jhanian	All-India Muslim League
72	64	Gurdaspur East	Ghulam Farid	All-India Muslim League
73	65	Batala	Fateh Mohammed Sayal	Independent
74	66	Shakargarh	Abdul Ghaffar Khan	All-India Muslim League
75	67	Sialkot North	Nasar Din	All-India Muslim League
76	68	Sialkot Center	Muhammad Sarfraz Khan	All-India Muslim League
77	69	Sialkot South	Mumtaz Mohammed Khan Doultana	All-India Muslim League
78	70	Gujranwala North	Salah-ud-din Chatha	All-India Muslim League
79	71	Gujranwala East	Zafrullah Khan	All-India Muslim League
80	72	Hafizabad	Mohammed Khan Tarar	All-India Muslim League
81	73	Sheikhupura	Mohammed Husain Chatha	All-India Muslim League
82	74	Nankana Sahib	Shahadat Khan	All-India Muslim League
83	75	Shahdara	Roshan Din	All-India Muslim League
84	76	Gujarat North	Fazal Ilahi	All-India Muslim League
85	77	Gujarat East	Asghar Ali Khan	Unionist Party
86	78	South-Eastern Gujarat	Bahawal Bakhsh	All-India Muslim League
87	79	North-Western Gujarat	Jahan Khan Busal	All-India Muslim League
88	80	South-Western Gujarat	Ghulam Rasul	All-India Muslim League
89	81	Shahpur	Sultan Ali Nangiana	Unionist Party
90	82	Khushab	Malik Khizar Hayat Tiwana	Unionist Party
91	83	Bhalwal	Fazl Haq Piracha	Indian National Congress
92	84	Sargodha	Allah Baksh Tiwana	Unionist Party
93	85	Jehlum	Khair Mehdi Khan	All-India Muslim League
94	86	Pind Dadan Khan	Raja Ghazanfar Ali Khan	All-India Muslim League
95	87	Chakwal	Raja Muhammed Sarfraz Khan	All-India Muslim League
96	88	Rawalpindi Sadar	Zafuul Haq	All-India Muslim League
97	89	Gujar Khan	Akbar Khan	All-India Muslim League
98	90	Rawalpindi East	Kale Khan	All-India Muslim League
99	91	Attock North	Mumtaz Ali Khan	All-India Muslim League
100	92	Attock Central	Mohammed Nawaz Khan	Independent
101	93	Attock South	Mohy-ud-din Lal Badshah	Unionist Party
102	94	Mianwali North	Abdur Sattar Khan	All-India Muslim League
103	95	Mianwali South	Mohammed Abdullah Khan	Unionist Party
104	96	Montgomery	Mohammed Khan Khatia	All-India Muslim League
105	97	Okara	Abdul Haq	All-India Muslim League
106	98	Dipalpur	Ashiq Hussain	All-India Muslim League
107	99	Pakpattan	Abdul Hamid Khan	All-India Muslim League
108	100	Lyallpur	Aziz Din	All-India Muslim League
109	101	Samunduri	Rai Mir Mohammed Khan	All-India Muslim League
110	102	Toba Tek Singh	Nurullah	All-India Muslim League
111	103	Jaranwal	Rai Anwar Khan	All-India Muslim League
112	104	Jhang East	Ghulam Mohammed Shah	All-India Muslim League
113	105	Jhang Central	Mubarak Ali Shah	All-India Muslim League
114	106	Jhang West	Mohammed Arif Khan Sial	All-India Muslim League
115	107	Multan	Ashiq Hussain Qureshi	Unionist Party
116	108	Shujabad	Mohammed Raja	All-India Muslim League
117	109	Lodhran	Gulam Mustafa Gilani	All-India Muslim League
118	110	Mailsi	Allah Yar Khan Doultana	All-India Muslim League
119	111	Khanewal	Budhan Shah Khagga	All-India Muslim League
120	112	Kabirwala	Naubahar Shah Bokhari	All-India Muslim League
121	113	Muzaffargarh Sadar	Abdul Hamid Khan Dasti	All-India Muslim League
122	114	Alipur	Mohammed Ibrahim Barq	Unionist Party
123	115	Muzaffargarh North	Gulam Jilani Gurmani	All-India Muslim League
124	116	Dera Gaji Khan North	Ata Mohammed Khan	All-India Muslim League
125	117	Dera Gaji Khan Central	Shah Faiz Mohammed	Unionist Party
126	118	Dera Gaji Khan South	Bahadur Khan Drishak	All-India Muslim League

Sikh Urban

S. No.	Cons. No.	Constituency	Winner	Party
127	119	Eastern Towns	Inder Singh	Shiromani Akali Dal
128	120	Western Towns	Ujjal Singh	Shiromani Akali Dal

Sikh Rural

S. No.	Cons. No.	Constituency	Winner	Party
129	121	South-Eastern Punjab	Narotam Singh	Shiromani Akali Dal
130	122	Ambala North	Baldev Singh	Shiromani Akali Dal
131	123	Kangara North-Hoshiarpur	Shiv Saran Singh	Shiromani Akali Dal
132	124	Hoshiarpur South	Piara Singh	Shiromani Akali Dal
133	125	Jullundur West	Swaran Singh	Shiromani Akali Dal
134	126	Jullundur East	Kabul Singh	Indian National Congress
135	127	Ludhiana East	Kapur Singh	Shiromani Akali Dal
136	128	Ludhiana Central	Bachan Singh	Indian National Congress
137	129	Jagraon	Kehar Singh	Indian National Congress
138	130	Ferozpur North	Rattan Singh	Shiromani Akali Dal
139	131	Ferozpur East	Rur Singh	Indian National Congress
140	132	Ferozpur West	Gurbachan Singh	Shiromani Akali Dal
141	133	Ferozpur South	Tara Singh	Shiromani Akali Dal
142	134	Lahore West	Sardul Singh	Independent
143	135	Kasur	Sajjan Singh	Indian National Congress
144	136	Amritsar North	Ishar Singh Majhail	Shiromani Akali Dal
145	137	Amritsar Central	Udham Singh Nagoke	Shiromani Akali Dal
146	138	Amritsar South	Partap Singh Kairon	Indian National Congress
147	139	Gurdaspur North	Shiv Singh	Indian National Congress
148	140	Batala	Waryam Singh	Shiromani Akali Dal
149	141	Sialkot	Gurbachan Singh Bajwa	Independent
150	142	Gujranwala-Shahadara	Joginder Singh Mann	Shiromani Akali Dal
151	143	Sheikhupura West	Maan Singh	Shiromani Akali Dal
152	144	Gujarat Shahpur	Prem Singh	Independent
153	145	North-Western Punjab	Jaswant Singh Duggal	Shiromani Akali Dal
154	146	Montgomery East	Narinder Singh	Shiromani Akali Dal
155	147	Lyallpur West	Giani Kartar Singh	Shiromani Akali Dal
156	148	Lyallpur East	Dalip Singh Kang	Shiromani Akali Dal
157	149	South-Western Punjab	Ajit Singh	Shiromani Akali Dal

Special

S. No	Cons. No.	Constituency	Winner	Party
Women
158	150	Lahore City (General)	Rameshwari Nehru	Indian National Congress
159	151	Inner Lahore (Muhammadan)	Begum Tassadaq Husain	All-India Muslim League
160	152	Outer Lahore (Muhammadan)	Jahagira Shah Nawaz	All-India Muslim League
161	153	Amritsar South (Sikh)	Raghbir Kaur	Indian National Congress
Anglo-Indian
162	154	Punjab Anglo-Indian	P. Manuel	Independent
European
163	155	European	P. H. Guest	Independent
Indian Christian
164	156	East-Central Punjab	Fazal Ilahi	Independent
165	157	West-Central Punjab	S. P. Sangha	Unionist Party
Commerce and Industry
166	158	Punjab Commerce and Industry	Bhagwan Das	Indian National Congress
Landholders
167	159	Eastern Punjab (General)	Durga Chand Kaushik	Indian National Congress
168	160	Central Punjab (Sikh)	Jagjit Singh	Shiromani Akali Dal
169	161	Northern Punjab (Muhammadan)	Malik Khizar Hayat Tiwana	Unionist Party
170	162	Western Punjab (Muhammadan)	Malik Khizar Hayat Tiwana	Unionist Party
171	163	Baluch Tumandars (Muhammadan)	Jamal Khan Leghari	Unionist Party
Trade and Labour Unions
172	164	Punjab Trade and Labour Unions	Ganga Saran	Indian National Congress
173	165	Eastern Punjab	Daud Ghaznavi	Indian National Congress
174	166	Northern Punjab	Barkat Hayat Khan	Independent
University
175	167	Punjab Universities	Gopi Chand Bhargava	Indian National Congress

== Government formation ==
A coalition consisting of the Congress, Unionist Party and the Akalis was formed in Punjab.

Ishtiaq Ahmed has given an account of how the Coalition Government in the United Punjab collapsed as a result of a massive campaign launched by the then Punjab Muslim League(the largest party in Punjab assembly at that time with 73 seats). AIML (Punjab) deemed the coalition government as a 'non-representative' government and thought it was their right to bring such government down (notwithstanding the fact that it was a legal and democratically elected government). AIML (P) called for a 'Civil Disobedience' movement (which was fully backed by Mr. Jinnah and Mr. Liaqat Ali Khan, after they had failed to enlist Sikh's support to help form an AIML led government in Punjab). This led to bloody communal riots in Punjab during the later part of 1946. By early 1947, Law and order situation in the Province came to such a point where civil life was utterly paralysed. It was under such circumstances that the coalition Punjab Premier (Chief Minister) Khizar Hayat Tiwana was forced to resign, on 2 March 1947. His cabinet was dissolved the same day. As there was no hope left for any other government to be formed to take the place of the Khizer government, the then Punjab Governor Sir Evan Jenkins imposed Governor's rule in Punjab on 5 March which continued up to the partition day, that is 15 August 1947. Akali Dal sikhs who, with 22 seats, were major stake-holders in the coalition government along with Congress(51) and the Unionist Party (20), were infuriated over the dissolution of the Khizar Government. It was in this backdrop that on 3 March 1947, Akali Sikh leader Master Tara Singh brandished his Kirpan outside Punjab Assembly saying openly:

Down with Pakistan and blood be to the one who demands it.

From this day onward, Punjab was engulfed in such bloodied communal riots that the history had never witnessed before. Eventually, Punjab had to be partitioned into the Indian Punjab and Pakistani Punjab. In the process, over a million people were massacred, millions more were forced to cross-over and to become refugees while thousands of women were abducted, raped and killed, across all religious communities in Punjab.

=== Interim Assembly (1947–1951) ===
On 3 June 1947 the assembly which was elected in 1946 divided into two parts. One was West Punjab Assembly and other was East Punjab Assembly to decide whether or not the province of Punjab be partitioned. After voting on both sides, partition was decided. Consequently, the existing Punjab Legislative Assembly was also divided into West Punjab Legislative Assembly and the East Punjab Legislative Assembly. The sitting members belonging to the Western Section subsequently became the members of the new Assembly renamed as the West Punjab Legislative Assembly.

==== East Punjab ====
The sitting members belonging to the Eastern Section subsequently became the members of the new Assembly renamed as the East Punjab Legislative Assembly. The members which were elected in 1946 election on the ticket of Shiromani Akali Dal and Unionist Party after Partition all joined the Indian National Congress. There were a total of 79 members.

On 15 August 1947 Gopi Chand Bhargava was elected the Chief Minister of East Punjab by the members of the interim assembly.

On 1 November 1947, the interim assembly sat for the first time. Kapur Singh was elected Speaker on the same day and 2 days later (on 3 November), Thakur Panchan Chand was elected Deputy Speaker.

On 6 April 1949 Bhim Sen Sachar and Pratap Singh Kairon with other members moved Motion of no confidence against Gopi Chand Bhargava. Dr. Bhargava failed to secure motion by one vote. No confidence motion was carried by 40 votes in favour and 39 against.

On the same day Bhim Sen Sachar elected the leader of congress assembly party. He took the oath of Chief Minister of Punjab on 13 April 1949. On the issue of corruption Sachar resigned from the post and on next day on 18 October 1949, Bhargava took charge of Chief Minister of Punjab.

Thakur Panchan Chand resigned from the post of Deputy Speaker on 20 March 1951. On 26 March 1951 Smt. Shanno Devi elected Deputy Speaker. Interim Assembly was dissolved on 20 June 1951.

==== West Punjab ====
On 15 August 1947, Iftikhar Hussain Khan Mamdot was elected Chief minister by members of the newly elected West Punjab Assembly.
