= Ghazanfar Ali Khan (disambiguation) =

Ghazanfar Ali Khan (Raja Ghazanfar Ali Khan Khokhar) (1895–1963) was an Indian politician and monarch.

Ghazanfar Ali Khan may also refer to:

- Ghazanfar Ali Khan (Pakistani politician), member of the Provincial Assembly of the Punjab
- Ghazanfar Ali Khan (journalist), Indian journalist
