= Raja Yassir Humayun =

Pakistani Punjab politician

Raja Yassir Humayun Sarfraz
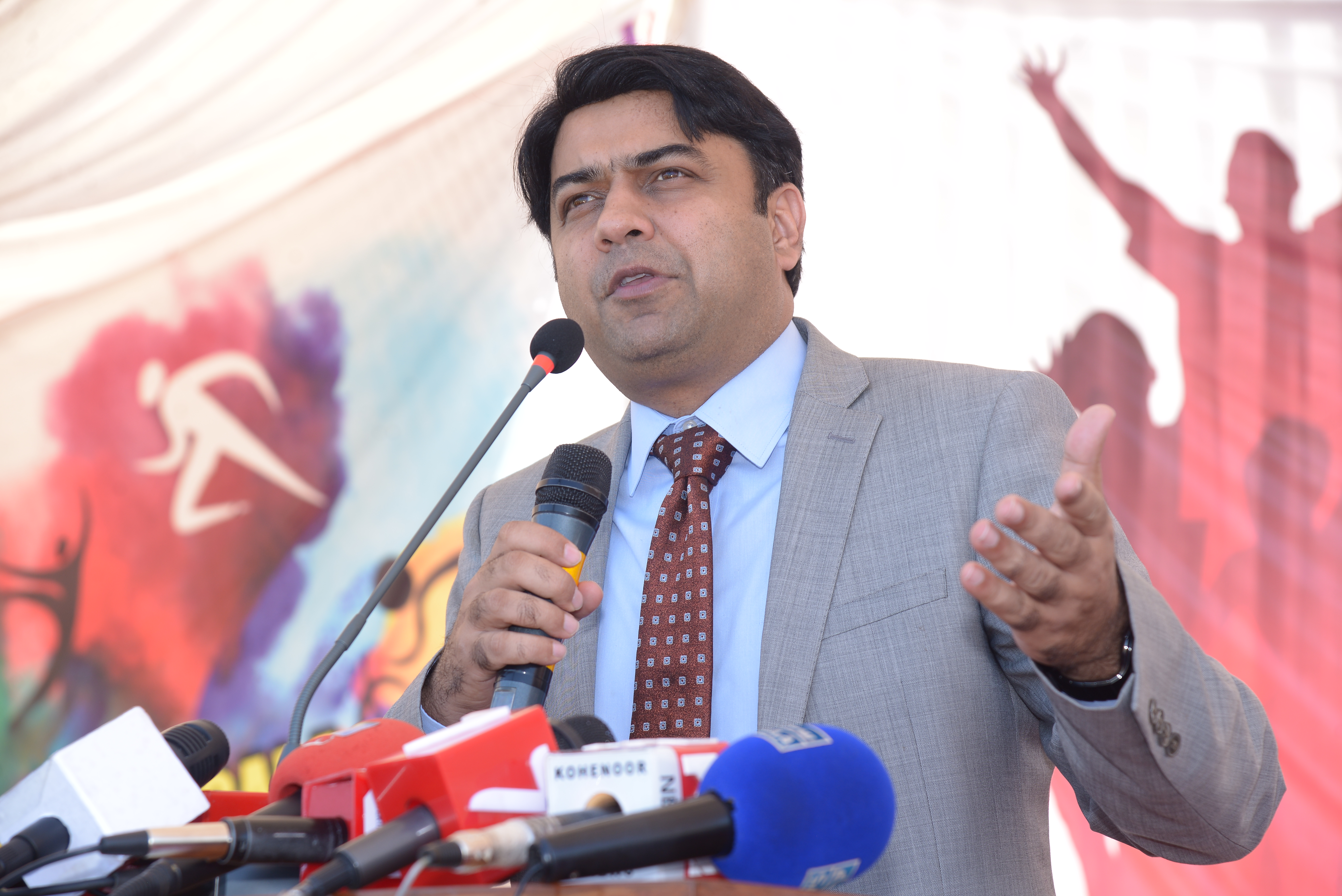

Provincial Minister of Punjab for Higher Education
- In office 27 August 2018 – 14 January 2023

Provincial Minister of Punjab for Information Technology
- In office 22 July 2019 – 27 March 2022

Provincial Minister of Punjab for Tourism
- In office 27 August 2018 – 19 July 2019

Member of the Provincial Assembly of the Punjab
- In office 15 August 2018 – 14 January 2023
- Constituency: PP-21 Chakwal-I

Personal details
- Party: PTI (2013-2023)

Raja Yassir Humayun Sarfraz is a Pakistani politician who was the Provincial Minister of Punjab for Higher Education and Information Technology in office since 6 August 2022 till 14 January 2023. Previously, he was Provincial Minister for Higher Education from 27 August 2018 to 27 March 2022. He has also been provincial minister of Punjab for tourism from 27 August 2018 to 19 July 2019. He also held the portfolio of Information Technology from 22 July 2019 to 27 March 2022. He had been a member of the Provincial Assembly of the Punjab from August 2018 till January 2023.

== Early life, education and professional career ==
He was born on 28 December 1972 in Faisalabad, Punjab Pakistan. Born to a feudal Rajput family, his family has significant influence in Chakwal and has been active in politics and philanthropy. His grandfather Raja Muhammed Sarfraz Khan was member of the Pakistan Movement and remained member of Punjab Legislative Council from 1929 to 1937 and member of Punjab Legislative Assembly from 1937 to 1958. His uncles Raja Sajjad Akbar and Raja Riaz Ahemad Khan have also remained members of Provincial and National Assemblies from late eighties till date.

He completed his schooling from Aitchison College in 1991 and proceeded to the United States to attend college. He graduated from the University of Florida and holds a Bachelor of Science degree in Computer & Information Systems.

After graduation he worked in a software company in Florida, USA for a while but then moved back to Pakistan in 1998. In 1999, he founded Myers College at Kot Sarfraz Khan in Chakwal.

== Political career ==
He joined Pakistan Tehreek-e-Insaf (PTI) in 2013.

He ran for the seat of the National Assembly of Pakistan as a candidate of PTI from Constituency NA-60 (Chakwal-I) in the 2013 Pakistani general election but was unsuccessful. He received 48,076 votes and lost the seat to Tahir Iqbal.

In 2018, he had applied for PTI ticket to contest for Constituency NA-64 (Chakwal-I). The allotment of ticket to Yassir Humayun caused rift in PTI's chapter in Chakwal. It was noted that at-least 3 PTI workers had applied for a ticket for Constituency PP-21 (Chakwal-I) but PTI decided to allocate the ticket to Yassir Humayun who had not even applied for the ticket.

He was elected to the Provincial Assembly of the Punjab as a candidate of PTI from Constituency PP-21 (Chakwal-I) in the 2018 general election.

On 27 August 2018, he was inducted into the provincial Punjab cabinet of Chief Minister Sardar Usman Buzdar and was appointed Provincial Minister of Punjab for higher education with the additional ministerial portfolio of tourism.

Additional portfolio of Provincial Minister of Punjab for Tourism was taken back from him on 19 July 2019, however, he was given the additional portfolio of Punjab Information Technology on July 22, 2019.

Following the May 9 riots and the perceived attack on Pakistan's institutions by PTI workers, like many other party notables he left PTI and politics in general.
