= Abdul Haye =

Mian Abdul Haye (December 1889 – 20 December 1946) was a prominent Punjabi lawyer and politician during the British Raj.

== Biography ==
Haye was born into a wealthy Muslim Awan family in Ludhiana, Punjab. He was educated at Forman Christian College and the law college of the University of the Punjab. He began his career as a lawyer in Ludhiana in 1910.

Shortly after he was elected to the Ludhiana municipality, becoming its Vice-President. During the First World War he assisted in recruitment to the army and was made a Member of the Order of the British Empire (MBE) in 1919. He played a prominent role in anti-Rowlatt bill meetings in Ludhiana and took an active part in the Khilafat Movement in 1921. Later that year he renounced his MBE awarded two year prior. He was elected to the Punjab Legislative Assembly in 1923 from the East Punjab Muslim constituency as a candidate of the Moderate Party. In 1933 he moved from Ludhiana to Lahore and joined the Unionist Party.

Following the Unionist victory at the 1937 provincial elections, he was made Minister of Education by Sir Sikandar Hayat Khan. As Education Minister he advocated free and compulsory primary education and a nationalist bias in the education system. During the Second World War he again assisted with recruitment into the army, and in raising a war loan.

Although working towards Muslim-Hindu unity for much of his career in 1946 he became a staunch advocate for the creation of Pakistan and supported the Direct Action Movement initiated by the Muslim League.
