= Elections in Punjab =

Elections in Punjab may refer to:

- Elections in Punjab, India
- Elections in Punjab, Pakistan
