= Khalsa National Party =

- Abbreviation: KNP
- Leader: Sundar Singh Majithia (1935–1941); Dasaundha Singh (1941–1946)
- Founder: Sundar Singh Majithia and Jogendra Singh
- Founded: 1935
- Dissolved: 1946
- Merged into: Shiromani Akali Dal
- Ideology: Sikhism; Indian Independence; Abolition of Communal Award

Khalsa National Party was formed by Sundar Singh Majithia and Joginder Singh to contest the 1937 Punjab Provincial Assembly election on the issues different from Shiromani Akali Dal.

== Background ==
Sundar Singh Majithia and Jogindra Singh were the member of Shiromani Akali Dal but due to differences on issues both formed the Khalsa National Party at Amritsar which was opened for all persons above the age of 21 years, irrespective of their caste and religion.

== Organisation and issues ==
The Central Executive Committee was consisted of not more than 31 members, including president. In each district the office bearers were a president and a secretary and executive committee was consisting of five members which were elected by the district organisations.

The five points creed of the party were

- To work for the realisation of the ideals of Sikhism.
- To work for attainment of Indian Independence.
- To work for abolition of Communal Award
- To work to unite all sections of the Sikh panth.
- To work for raising the social and economic standard of the masses.

== 1937 election ==
After the passing of Government of India Act 1935, Provincial Assembly was set up in Punjab containing 175 seats. Khalsa National Party also contested the election and won 13 constituencies. Khalsa National Party along with Hindu Election Board joined the hands with Unionist Party and formed the Government. Under the leadership of Sikandar Hayat Khan Sundar Singh Majithia sworn as minister of Development.

After the death of Sundar Singh Majithia in April 1941 another Party leader Dasaundha Singh added into the cabinet.

== Merger ==
The death of Sundar Singh Majithia considerably weakened the Party. In 1942 after Sikandar-Baldev Pact KNP leader and minister Dasaundha Singh was removed from the cabinet and Baldev Singh joined in the cabinet.

In 1946 Punjab Provincial Assembly election party failed to get even a single seat. After this most of its members joined Shiromani Akali Dal.
