= Ghazanfar Ali Khan (journalist) =

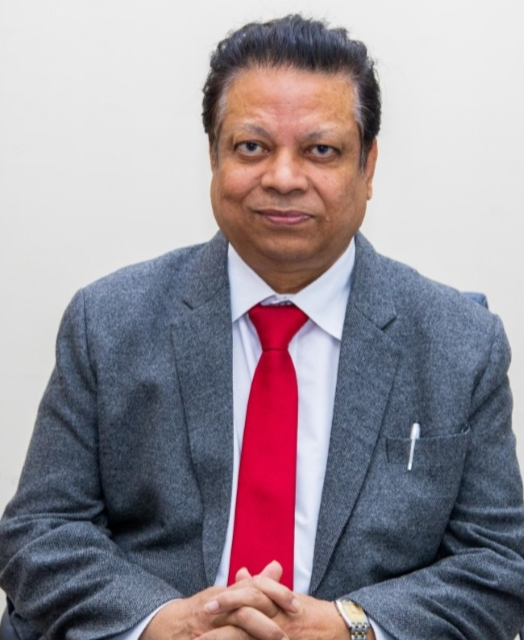
- Born: Ghazanfar Ali Khan
- Citizenship: Indian
- Education: S. L. Jain High School, Darauli, Siwan (Bihar); Aligarh Muslim University (AMU), Aligarh, India
- Occupation: Senior journalist & media consultant
- Employer(s): The Times of India, The Hindustan Times, Riyadh Daily and Arab News
- Website: ghazanfaralikhan.com

Ghazanfar Ali Khan is a senior journalist, media consultant, and social worker based in Riyadh, Saudi Arabia. He was the Bureau Chief at Arab News, an English newspaper covering Saudi Arabia and the Gulf region.

== Education and career ==
Khan was born on October 8, 1962, in Darauli village, Siwan district, Bihar, to Abdul Hamid Khan and Koraisha Khatoon. He attended S.L. Jain High School in Darauli, Siwan, Bihar for his high school education. Later, he pursued higher studies at Aligarh Muslim University in Aligarh, Uttar Pradesh, where he earned a Bachelor of Arts Honors and a Master of Arts in English. Khan also has a Postgraduate Diploma in Journalism from the Management Promotion Institute in Delhi and has been awarded an honorary doctorate by the World Human Rights Protection Commissions (WHRPC).

From 1993 to December 2018, Khan worked with Arab News initially as a Senior Reporter and later as Bureau Chief in Riyadh. Prior to this, he was associated with prominent Indian daily newspapers from 1985 to 1991. Khan also served as a contributing editor for The Diplomat Magazine, published by the Saudi Ministry of Foreign Affairs. His contributions to Ahlan Wasahlan, the inflight magazine of Saudi Arabian Airlines, focusing on tourism, travel, and key destinations, received commendation. He also contributed stories and features to the Associated Press in 1994 and 1995 across various publications including Arab News, The Diplomat, Ahlan Wasahlan, The Hindustan Times, and The Nation and the World.

== Books ==
- Mera Paigham Mohabbat Hai Jahan Tak Pahunchay

== Awards and recognition ==
1995:

- Received Saudi Arabia's Arab News Best Reporter Award.
- Participated in the Global Media Summit in South Korea.

2006:

- Panelist at Global Inter-Media Dialogue in Bali, Indonesia in 2006.

2008:

- Participated in the Global Forum for Media Development in Athens, Greece in 2008.

2009:

- Received the European Union Familiarization Certificate.
- Presented a research paper on Indo-Saudi Cultural Relations at the Center for Asian studies at Prince Saud Al Faisal Institute for Diplomatic Studies, Ministry of Foreign Affairs, Saudi Arabia.

2013:

- Member of the jury of the Samir Foundation Award in Lebanon (Selected by EU).

2016:

- Participated in the Middle East Journalists' Visit Program organized by the Singapore Government in 2016.

2018 & 2019:

- Participated in the Global Media Forum in Bonn, Germany in 2018 and 2019.
- Member of Saudi Journalists' Association, Riyadh 2019.

2024:

- Awarded an honorary doctorate and membership by The World Human Rights Protection Commission (WHRPC) for his contributions to journalism and social work over the past 30 years.
- Received an award from the Aligarh Muslim University Old Boys Association in Patna, Bihar, for his work in journalism, particularly for helping Muslims and minorities.

== Personal life ==
Khan is married to Rizwana Khan, who teaches Hindi at the International Indian School, Riyadh (IISR) in Saudi Arabia. He has one son and two daughters.
