= Ghazanfar Ali Khan =

Indian politician and monarch (1895-1963)

Raja Ghazanfar Ali Khan Khokhar

Indian Minister of Health
- In office 2 September 1946 – 14 August 1947
- Prime Minister: Jawaharlal Nehru
- Succeeded by: Rajkumari Amrit Kaur

Minister of Finance of Alwar State
- In office 11 January 1933 – 13 February 1937
- Monarch: Jai Singh Prabhakar
- Prime Minister: Francis Verner Wylie
- Preceded by: L Alak Dhari
- Succeeded by: Rao Sahib Lala Ramlal Anand

Personal details
- Born: 16 August 1895 Pind Dadan Khan, Jhelum district, Punjab, British India (present-day Punjab, Pakistan.)
- Died: 17 April 1963 (aged 67)
- Party: Unionist party All-India Muslim League; Pakistan Muslim League (post-independence)
- Education: Government College, Lahore
- Profession: Politician; Diplomat

Raja Ghazanfar Ali Khan Khokhar (16 August 1895 – 17 April 1963) was a Pakistan Movement activist, politician and diplomat. He was born in Pind Dadan Khan, a town in Jhelum district, British India. He was a leading member of the All India Muslim League and a trusted lieutenant of Muhammad Ali Jinnah, serving in the Interim Government of India of 1946 as a member of the Central Legislative Assembly of India.

After independence of Pakistan in 1947, he became the minister of Food, Agriculture and Health in the Government of Pakistan and finally a diplomat for Pakistan in many countries from 1948 to 1957.

== Early life and career ==
Ghazanfar Ali Khan's father was Saif Ali Khan. A Rajput Khokhar from Pind Dadan Khan in Jhelum district, Ghazanfar Ali was an uncle of Pir Syed Fazal Shah of Jalalpur Sharif, another influential figure in the region during the Pakistan Movement. Ghazanfar completed his high school education at Jhelum and then went on to Government College, Lahore.

Ghazanfar Ali Khan joined the Unionist Party in 1923 because he had political ambitions and was a prominent figure in Muslim politics by 1927, when he attended a conference, comprising 30 significant Muslim leaders, that resulted in the "Delhi Muslim Proposals" which attempted to address constitutional development but were ultimately thwarted by the recommendations of the 1928 Nehru Report. He persuaded his nephew to support his career in politics and this brought with it support from those who favoured his nephew Pir Fazal Shah himself.

He was appointed a Revenue Minister of Alwar State in 1933 and remained on the position till 1937.

He stood in the 1937 provincial elections to the Punjab Legislative Assembly as a candidate of the All-India Muslim League and won this election to become a member of Punjab Legislative Assembly from 1937 to 1945. But then deserted the Muslim League in favour of the Unionist Party after being offered a position as a parliamentary secretary by Malik Khizar Hayat Tiwana. He supported the pact arranged at Lucknow between Sikandar Hayat Khan and Muhammad Ali Jinnah in October 1937, believing that the nationalist movement had suffered greatly from internal divisions and that a political party that united the aspirant Hindu and Muslim nationalist communities might prove more effective. In 1944, he returned to the League fold after the split between Khizar Hayat Tiwana and Jinnah, realising that the League was likely to get the upper hand. His uncle and local supporters followed him through these various manoeuvres.

In the February 1946 provincial elections, Khan was a candidate for the League in the Pind Dadan Khan constituency 77 and won the election for Muslim League. In October of that year, he was among the five men nominated by Jinnah on behalf of the League to join the interim Government of India, in which he subsequently took the Minister of Food, Agriculture and Health portfolio. The other four nominated by the League were Liaquat Ali Khan, I. I. Chundrigar, Abdur Rab Nishtar and Jogendra Nath Mandal. He said of the League's involvement that "We are going into the interim government to get a foothold to fight for our cherished goal of Pakistan".

After the Partition of India, Khan became Pakistan's Minister for Food, Agriculture and Health. He was minister for refugees and rehabilitation in 1948, during a period when there was much controversy regarding the movement of Muslim people between the now-divided India and Pakistan.

In 1948, he became the first president of the newly formed Pakistan Hockey Federation and served for 2 years in that position (1948–1950).

From 1948 to 1957, he took to a new career as a diplomat. He was successively Ambassador to Iran (1948-1952), Ambassador to Turkey (1952-1953), High Commissioner to India (1954-1956) and finally Ambassador to Italy (1956-1957).

== Death and legacy ==
Raja Ghazanfar Ali Khan died on 17 April 1963.

- In honour of his contribution to Pakistan, a major road called 'Raja Ghazanfar Ali Khan Road' near Bohri Bazaar in Saddar, Karachi was named after him.
- Pakistan Postal Services issued a commemorative postage stamp in his honor in its 'Pioneers of Freedom' series in 1990.
