= Premier of the Punjab =

Head of government of Punjab Province in British India

- Emblem of the Punjab

- Flag of the Punjab

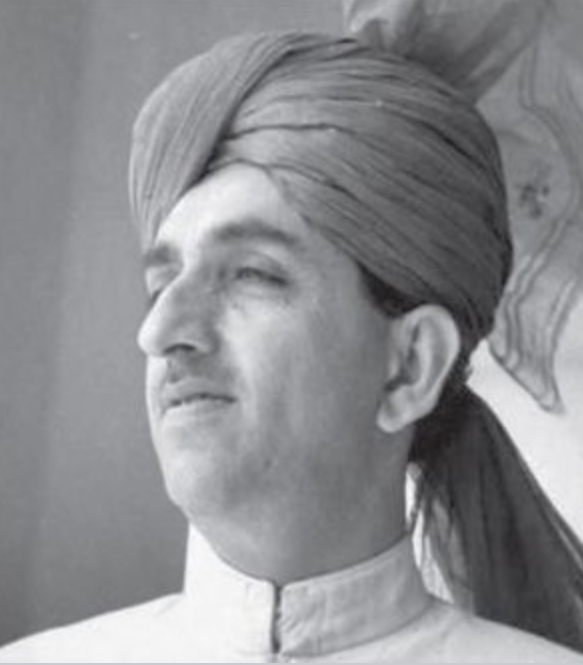
- Final holder Khizar Hayat Tiwana; 30 December 1942 – 2 March 1947
- Appointer: Governor of Punjab
- Formation: 5 April 1937
- First holder: Sikandar Hayat Khan
- Final holder: Khizar Hayat Tiwana
- Abolished: 15 August 1947
- Succession: Chief Minister of Punjab (India); Chief Minister of Punjab (Pakistan)

The Premier of the Punjab was the head of government and the Leader of the House in the Legislative Assembly of Punjab Province in British India. The position was dissolved upon the Partition of India in 1947.

== History ==
The office was created under the Government of India Act 1935. The Unionist Party was the principal legislative force in the province. It received support from legislators of the Punjab Muslim League, the Indian National Congress and the Sikh Akali Dal at various periods. The Unionist government implemented agrarian reforms in Punjab by using legal and administrative measures to relieve farmers and peasants of crippling debt. Similar steps were taken by the Prime Minister of Bengal. The Unionists opposed the Quit India movement and supported the Allies during World War II. The Unionists were constitutionalists who favored cooperation with the British to achieve independence from the Raj.

The Unionists signed the Lucknow Pact with the All India Muslim League (AIML) in 1937. The Punjab premier supported the drafting of the Lahore Resolution in 1940. In 1941, the premiers of Punjab and Bengal joined the Viceroy's defence council against the wishes of the AIML. The second Punjab premier joined the Paris Peace Conference in 1946.

== Premiers of the Punjab (1937-1947) ==
No	Name (constituency)	Birth - Death	Image	Took office	Left office	Term	Party (Coalition with)	Election (Assembly)	Appointed by
1	Sir Sikandar Hayat Khan	5 June 1892 – 26 December 1942		5 April 1937	26 December 1942	5 years, 265 days	Unionist Party (KNP)	1937 (1)	Sir Herbert Emerson
2	Sir Malik Khizar Hayat Tiwana	7 August 1900 – 20 January 1972		30 December 1942	5 February 1946	3 years, 37 days	Unionist Party (KNP)	(1)	Sir Bertrand Glancy
(i)	Governor Rule (Sir Bertrand Glancy)			5 February 1946	21 March 1946	44 days	-	-	Viscount Wavell
(2)	Sir Malik Khizar Hayat Tiwana	7 August 1900 – 20 January 1972		21 March 1946	2 March 1947	346 days	Unionist Party (INC and SAD)	1946 (2)	Sir Bertrand Glancy
(ii)	Governor Rule (Sir Evan Jenkins)			2 March 1947	15 August 1947	166 days	-	-	Earl Mountbatten

== Legacy ==
The office was succeeded by the Chief Minister of Punjab (Pakistan) and Chief Minister of Punjab (India).

== See also ==
- Legislatures of British India
