= Jogendra Singh =

Indian civil servant

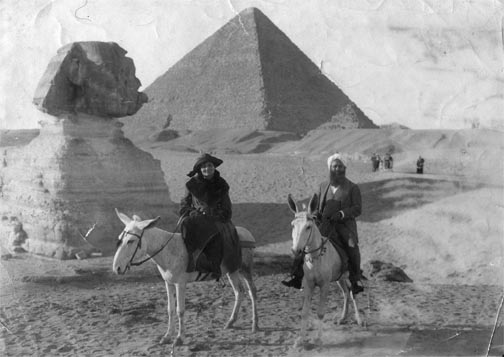
Sardar Sir Jogendra Singh accompanied by his second wife, Lady Winifred May Singh (née O'Donoghue) in Egypt c. 1920.

Sardar Sir Jogendra Singh KCSI (25 May 1877 – 3 December 1946) was a member of the Viceroy's Executive Council in India. He served as Chairman of the Department of Health, Education and Lands. He was a figure in the Sikh community and one of several delegates chosen to represent the Sikh community before the Cripps' mission of 1942. He is also considered responsible for setting up a committee in 1946 that led to the formation of Indian Institutes of Technology.

== Political Career and Public Service ==
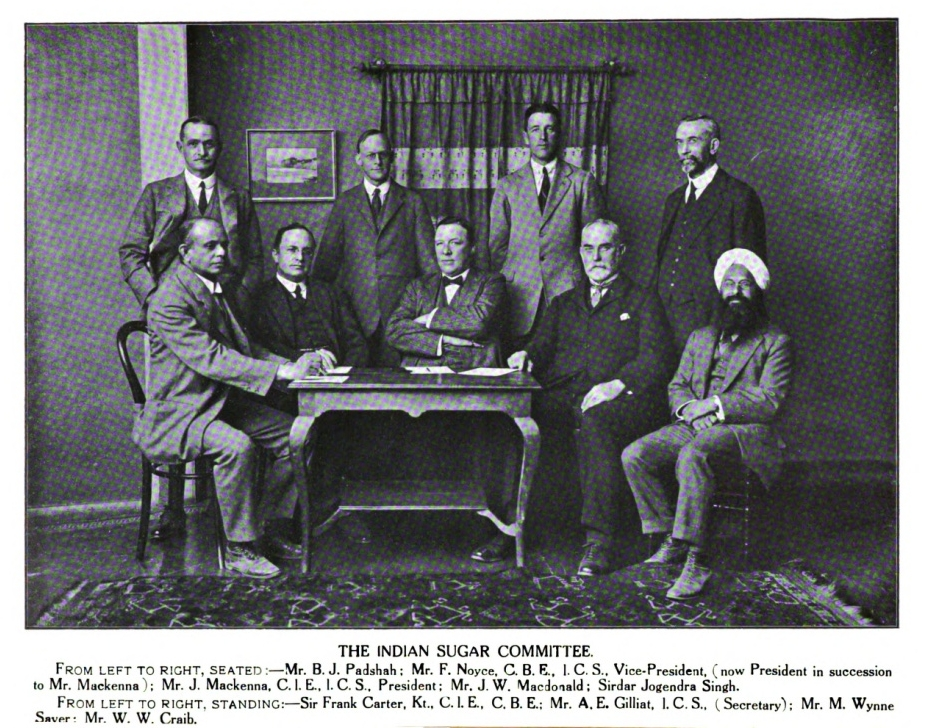
Seated rightmost in the Sugar Committee of 1920

He was an active statesman in Colonial India, evidenced by the posts he was awarded. In 1911, he was appointed Home Minister of the princely state of Patiala. In 1926, he was nominated to the Punjab Legislative Council and made a minister for three successive terms. Of note was the Mandi Hydroelectric Project (now known as the Shanan Power House), completed during his tenure. The adjoining township of Joginder Nagar was named in his honor. He formed the Khalsa National Party in 1936 which won the 1937 elections created under the Government of India Act of 1935. When the Executive Council of the British Viceroy of India was expanded in July 1942, Sir Jogendra Singh was nominated, becoming the first Sikh member. He was a member of the Sikh delegation to the Cripps Mission that visited India in late March 1942.

== Knighthood and Role in Establishing IITs ==
He was first knighted in 1929, and later made a Knight Commander of the Star of India (KCSI) with a second knighthood in the 1946 Birthday Honours List. Sir Jogendra Singh is also credited with setting up the 22-member Sarkar Committee, headed by Nalini Ranjan Sarkar, that recommended setting up higher technical institutions in India. This ultimately led to the establishment of the first Indian Institute of Technology in Kharagpur, West Bengal.

== Literary Works and Scholarship ==
He authored multiple books, notable among which was Life of B.M. Malabari (1914), Kamla (1931), Thus Spake Guru Nanak (1934), and Sikh Ceremonies (1940). In his later years, he focused on themes in Sikhism and religion. Notably, his English translation of the verses of 11th-century Sufi saint Abdullah Ansari, titled The Persian Mystics (1939), carried a foreword by Mahatma Gandhi.

== Death and Legacy ==
Sir Jogendra Singh died of a paralytic stroke at Iqbal Nagar, district Montgomery (now in Pakistan) on 3 December 1946. He was succeeded by his second wife Winifred May Singh (née O'Donoghue), his six children, and twenty grandchildren, some of whom still reside at the Aira Holme Estate, Shimla.
