= Kot Sarfraz Khan =

Kot Sarfraz Khan (formerly Kot Torabaz Khan) is one of the oldest living settlements in Chakwal, Punjab, Pakistan.

Kot Sarfraz Khan was founded in 1751 C.E by the Talukdar of Dhanni, Chaudhry Subhan Quli Khan and named after his son Chaudhry Torabaz Khan. It was founded on a small hill in the suburbs of old Chakwal city and was also called Kot Kallan (meaning the bigger fortress).

It was included in the municipal committee limits of Chakwal in 1881. Although it was mainly occupied by the Chakwal Chaudhrials, chiefs of Mair-Minhas Rajput tribe, there were considerable Hindu and Sikh residents before 1947.

The oldest surviving building in Kot Sarfraz is the Bungalow built in 1873, by late Chaudhrial of Chakwal, Khan Bahadur, Raja Sahib, Chaudhry Aurangzeb Khan.

In 1968, it was renamed Kot Sarfraz Khan after Raja Muhammed Sarfraz Khan, the famous politician and philanthropist from Chakwal.
