= Zafar Sarfraz =

Pakistani cricketer (1969–2020)

Personal information
- Born: 30 October 1969; Peshawar, North-West Frontier Province, Pakistan
- Died: 13 April 2020 (aged 50); Peshawar, Pakistan
- Batting: Left-handed
- Role: Middle-order batsman
- Relatives: Akhtar Sarfraz (brother)

Domestic team information
- Years: Team
- 1988–1992: Peshawar
- Source: Cricinfo, 13 April 2020

Zafar Sarfraz (30 October 1969 – 13 April 2020) was a Pakistani cricketer who played in 15 first-class and six List A matches between 1988 and 1992 for Peshawar cricket team.

He retired from competitive cricket in 1994. Following his retirement, he became a coach and was involved with the Peshawar Under-19 cricket team. He also worked for the National Bank of Pakistan.

In April 2020, Sarfaz died from COVID-19 complications in Peshawar, Pakistan. He was the first professional cricketer known to have died from coronavirus during the pandemic in Pakistan.
