= Punjab Legislative Assembly (British India) =

Provincial legislation in British India

Type
- Type: Lower house
- Term limits: 5 years

History
- Founded: 5 April 1937
- Disbanded: 4 July 1947
- Preceded by: Punjab Legislative Council
- Succeeded by: East Punjab Legislative Assembly (India); West Punjab Legislative Assembly (Pakistan)

Leadership
- Speaker: Shahab-ud-Din Virk (First)
- Sataya Prakash Singha (Last)
- Deputy Speaker: Dasaundha Singh (First)
- Kapur Singh (Last)
- Prime Minister: Sikandar Hayat Khan (First)
- Malik Khizar Hayat Tiwana (Last)
- Leader of Opposition: Gopi Chand Bhargava (First)
- Iftikhar Hussain Khan Mamdot (Last)
- Seats: 175: Single member-159; Double member-8

Elections
- Voting system: First-past-the-post
- First election: 1937
- Last election: 1946

Meeting place
- Lahore

Constitution
- Government of India Act 1935

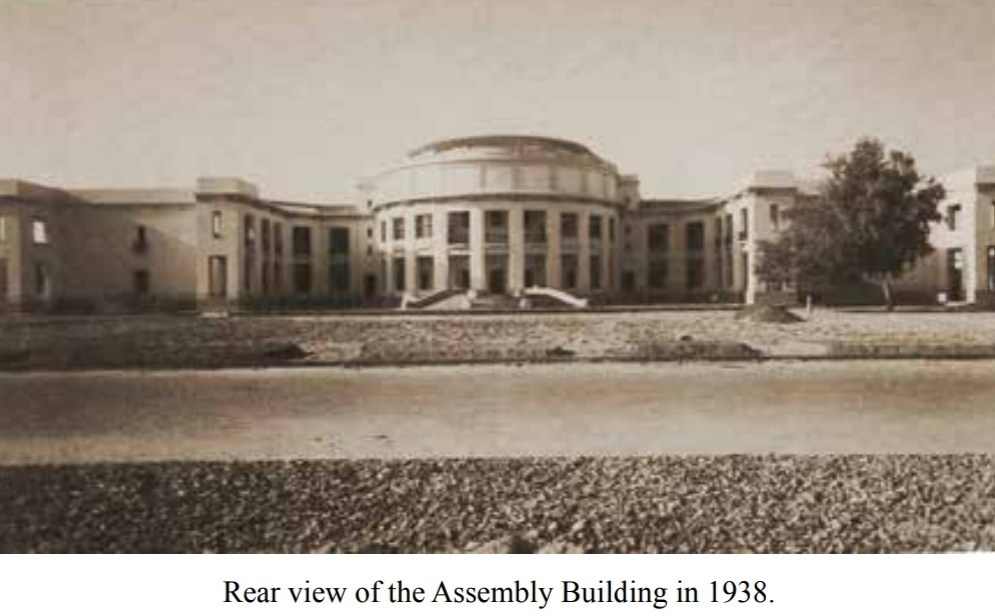
Punjab Assembly building in Lahore 1938.

The Punjab Legislative Assembly was the legislature of the province of Punjab in British India. Established by British authorities under Government of India Act 1935, the assembly had executive powers and members directly elected from 175 constituencies by first past the post system.

== Speakers ==
S. No.	Name	Tenure		Party	Assembly
1	Shahab-ud-Din Virk	6 April 1937	16 March 1945	Unionist Party	1st
2	Sataya Prakash Singha	21 March 1946	4 July 1947	Unionist Party	2nd

== Deputy Speakers ==
S. No.	Name	Tenure		Party	Assembly
1	Dasaundha Singh	6 April 1937	7 April 1941	Unionist Party	1st
2	Gurbachan Singh	22 April 1941	16 March 1945	Unionist Party	1st
3	Kapur Singh	26 March 1946	4 July 1947	Unionist Party	2nd

== Prime minister ==
S. No.	Name	Tenure		Party	Assembly
1	Sikandar Hayat Khan	5 April 1937	26 December 1942	Unionist Party	1st
2	Malik Khizar Hayat Tiwana	30 December 1942	19 March 1945	Unionist Party	1st
2	Malik Khizar Hayat Tiwana	21 March 1946	2 March 1947	Unionist Party	2nd

== Seats Distribution ==
All 175 constituencies were reserved on the bases of religion. It was as follows:-

Constituency Type	Urban	Rural	Total
General	8	34	42
Muhammadans	9	75	84
Sikhs	2	29	31
Special^	-	-	18
Total	19	138	175

^Special constituencies (non-territory constituency) were further divided into Categories and sub-categories as follow:-

- Women - 4
  - General - 1
  - Mohammadans - 2
  - Sikhs - 1
- European - 1
- Anglo-Indian - 1
- Indian Christian - 2
- Punjab Commerce and Industry - 1
- Landholders - 5
  - General - 1
  - Mohammadans - 3
  - Sikhs - 1
- Trade and Labour Unions - 3
- University - 1

== First Assembly ==
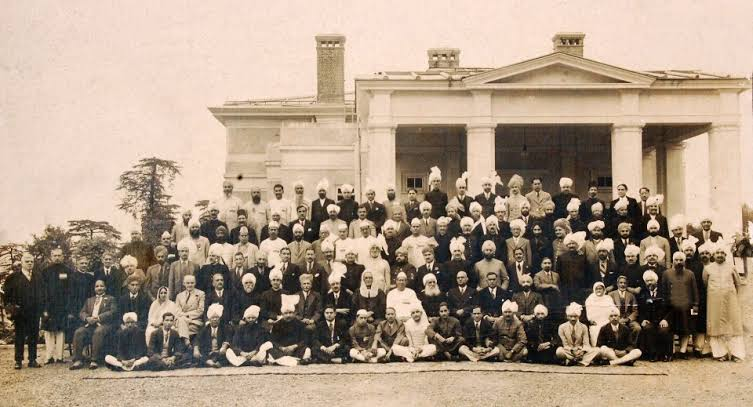
Members of Punjab Legislative Assembly elected in 1937

After the passing of Government of India act 1935, Legislative assembly was set up in Punjab. It consisted of 175 constituencies. Out of these 159 were single-member constituencies and 8 were double-members constituencies. In double-members constituencies one was reserved for the Schedule Caste according to Poona Pact. In double constituencies each voter had two votes to cast his vote, one for SC candidate and one for general candidate but considered as one vote to calculate voter turnout.

Party	Seats won
Unionist Party (UoP)	98
Indian National Congress (INC)	18
Khalsa National Party (KNP)	13
Hindu Election Board (HEB)	12
Shiromani Akali Dal (SAD)	11
Majlis-e-Ahrar-ul-Islam (MAI)	4
All-India Muslim League (AIML)	2
Congress Nationalist Party (CNP)	1
Independents (IND)	16
Total	175

== Second Assembly ==
On the eve of the elections, the political landscape in the Punjab was finely poised, and the Muslim League offered a credible alternative to the Unionist Party. The transformation itself had been rapid, as most landlords and pirs had not switched allegiance until after 1944. The breakdown of talks between the Punjab Premier, Malik Khizar Hayat Tiwana and Muhammad Ali Jinnah in late 1944 had meant many Muslims were now forced to choose between the two parties at the forthcoming election. A further blow for the Unionists came with death of its leading statesman Sir Chhotu Ram in early 1945.

The Result of election was as follows:-

Party	Seats won	Change
All-India Muslim League	73	▲71
Indian National Congress	51	▲33
Shiromani Akali Dal	21	▲10
Unionist Party	19	▼79
Independent	11	▼05
Others	0	▼30
Total	175	
