= Akhtar Sarfraz =

Pakistani cricketer, coach, and selector (1976–2019)

Personal information
- Full name: Akhtar Sarfraz
- Born: 20 February 1976; Peshawar, North-West Frontier Province, Pakistan
- Died: 10 June 2019 (aged 43); Lahore, Punjab, Pakistan
- Batting: Left-handed
- Bowling: Left-arm medium pace
- Role: Batsman
- Relatives: Zafar Sarfraz (brother); Irfan Sarfraz (brother)

International information
- National side: Pakistan
- ODI debut: 12 December 1997 v West Indies
- Last ODI: 29 October 1998 v West Indies

Domestic team information
- Years: Team
- 1994/95–2006/07: Peshawar
- 1996/97–2005/06: National Bank of Pakistan
- 2004/05–2005/06: Peshawar Panthers

Career statistics
| Competition | ODI | First-class | List A |
|---|---|---|---|
| Matches | 4 | 118 | 98 |
| Runs scored | 66 | 5,720 | 2,636 |
| Batting average | 16.50 | 36.43 | 35.62 |
| 100s/50s | 0/0 | 13/33 | 0/22 |
| Top score | 25 | 162 | 90 |
| Balls bowled | – | 382 | 102 |
| Wickets | – | 4 | 2 |
| Bowling average | – | 58.50 | 42.00 |
| 5 wickets in innings | – | 0 | 0 |
| 10 wickets in match | – | 0 | 0 |
| Best bowling | – | 2/27 | 1/4 |
| Catches/stumpings | 0/– | 57/– | 21/– |
- Source: CricketArchive, 1 May 2026

Akhtar Sarfraz (20 February 1976 – 10 June 2019) was a Pakistani cricketer, coach and selector. Sarfraz was a left-handed batsman who also bowled occasional left-arm medium pace. He was born in Peshawar, North-West Frontier Province, and played four One Day Internationals for Pakistan between 1997 and 1998.

Born into a cricketing family whose roots were in Tormang village in Lower Dir, Sarfraz was one of three brothers to play first-class cricket, the others being Zafar Sarfraz and Irfan Sarfraz. A left-handed batsman, he came through the Pakistan Under-19 structure in 1992–93 and made his first-class debut for Peshawar in 1994–95. His first major innings in senior cricket came in 1995–96, when he carried his bat for 134 not out against Bahawalpur. In the following season he repeated the feat with 104 not out against Rawalpindi.

Sarfraz's highest first-class score was 162, made off 200 balls against Karachi Whites at the KCCA Stadium in 1995–96. He was part of the accomplished Peshawar batting line-up, alongside players such as Wajahatullah Wasti, Younis Khan and Yasir Hameed, that won the Quaid-e-Azam Trophy for the first time in 1998–99. In the final against Karachi Whites, Sarfraz made 98 and shared a fifth-wicket partnership of 233 with Wasti, who scored 135, in Peshawar's total of 526.

He also represented Pakistan A on several tours, including Bangladesh in 1996–97, Malaysia in 1998–99, New Zealand in 1998–99 and Abu Dhabi in 1999–2000. One of his best limited-overs innings came for Pakistan A against India A at Sheikhupura Stadium in March 1998, when he scored 90 from 75 balls and was named player of the match in a six-wicket win. His highest score in recognized List A cricket remained 90, and across 98 List A matches he scored 2,636 runs with 22 half-centuries.

Sarfraz made his ODI debut for Pakistan against the West Indies at Sharjah in December 1997, scoring 25 from 25 balls. He then made 7 against India and 20 against England in the same tournament. His fourth and final ODI came in the quarter-final of the 1998 ICC KnockOut Trophy against the West Indies at Dhaka, in which he scored 14.

Late in his career, playing for the North West Frontier Province Governor's XI against the touring England side in November 2000, Sarfraz scored 53 in the second innings at Peshawar. Overall, he played 118 first-class matches, scoring 5,720 runs at a batting average of 36.43, with 13 centuries and 33 half-centuries. He also played eight Twenty20 matches for Peshawar Panthers, scoring 112 runs.

After his playing career, Sarfraz worked for the Pakistan Cricket Board as a regional coach and later served as a selector for the Pakistan women's team between 2018 and 2019. He died in Lahore on 10 June 2019 at the age of 43 after a battle with cancer, and was buried in his native Lower Dir.
