= Sarfaraz Khan (disambiguation) =

Sarfaraz Khan was an 18th-century Nawab of Bengal.

Sarfaraz Khan may also refer to:

- Sarfaraz Khan (actor) (born 1976), Indian film actor and producer
- Sarfaraz Khan (cricketer) (born 1997), Indian cricketer
