= Sarfraz Ali (disambiguation) =

Sarfraz Ali (1968‒2022) was a Pakistani general.

Sarfraz Ali may alo refer to:

- Sarfraz Ali (murderer) (born c. 1977), convicted of the 2001 murder of Ross Parker
- Sarfaraz Ali (born 1981), cricketer playing for Bahrain
