= Bertrand Glancy =

Irish-born British colonial administrator

Sir Bertrand Glancy GCIE KCSI
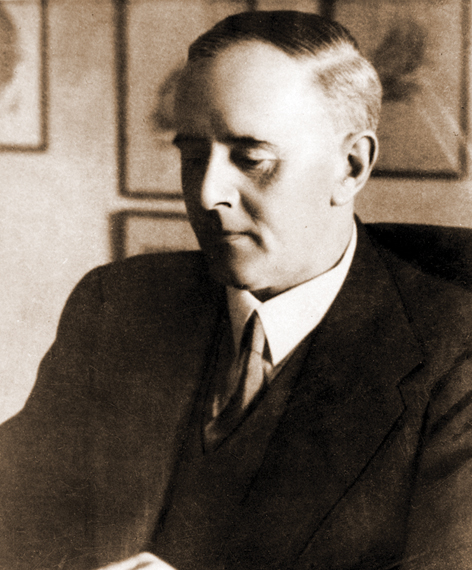

Lieutenant Governor of Punjab
- In office 7 April 1941 – 8 April 1946
- Governors General: The Marquess of Linlithgow; The Earl Wavell
- Preceded by: Sir Henry Duffield Craik, Bt
- Succeeded by: Sir Evan Jenkins

Personal details
- Born: Bertrand James Glancy; 31 December 1882 Dublin, Ireland, United Kingdom
- Died: 17 March 1953 (aged 70) Nairobi, Colony of Kenya
- Education: Exeter College, Oxford

Sir Bertrand James Glancy GCIE KCSI (31 December 1882 – 17 March 1953) was an Irish-born British colonial administrator and Governor of the Punjab between 1941 and 1946.

== Early life ==
Glancy was born on 31 December 1882 in Dublin, the son of Bertha Glancy (nee Hellmuth) and Colonel Thomas Glancy. He was educated at Clifton and Exeter College, Oxford. In 1905 he joined the Indian Civil Service.

== Indian Civil Service ==
In 1909, Glancy joined the Indian Civil Service and moved to the Political Department. In 1931, he was appointed by the Maharaja of Jammu and Kashmir to head a commission to enquire into the grievances of Muslim subjects of the state. He also served as the Finance member of the Maharaja's cabinet. He served as the officiating Resident in Punjab in 1932 and as the Resident and AGG for Central India from 1933. In 1941, he was appointed as the Governor of Punjab. He retired in 1946.

The "Glancy Commission", as his commission in Kashmir came to be known, recommended far-reaching reforms, introducing people's representation in legislative bodies, which led to the first general election in the state in 1934. It is regarded as a major landmark in the modern history of Kashmir.

== Family and later life ==
Glancy had married Grace Steele in 1914 and had one son, on his retirement they went to live in Kenya where he died aged 70 on 17 March 1953. They later had a daughter.
