= Shahab-ud-Din Virk =

Indian Punjabi politician

Khan Bahadur Chaudhry Sir Shahab-ud-Din Virk (died 1946) was a Punjabi lawyer and politician of British India.

== Biography ==
Chaudhry Shahabuddin was born into a Muslim Jat family of the Virk tribe hailing from Sialkot District in what was then Punjab, British India.

He was educated at Government College University in Lahore. In 1912 he was elected to Lahore Municipal Committee. He became a member of the Punjab Legislative Council in 1923, and was elected President for three consecutive terms between 1925 and 1936. He was made a Knight Bachelor in the New Year Honours list of 1930. In 1936 the Council was replaced by the Punjab Legislative Assembly, and Virk served as the Speaker of the Assembly between April 1937 and March 1945. He died in Lahore in 1946.
