= World Human Rights Protection Commissions =

Indian human rights organisation

- Founded at: New Delhi, India
- Type: Non-profit
- Chairman: Tapan Kumar Rautaray
- Key people: WHRPC Members
- Website: whrpc.org

World Human Rights Protection Commissions (WHRPC) is an Indian non-profit organisation which gives honorary doctorate degrees to members.

== Mission ==
World Human Rights Protection Commissions, India has been established by an Act of Parliament under the Protection of Human Rights Act, 1882 for the protection and promotion of human rights. In addition to the functions of the Commission set forth in Section 12 of the Act and the investigation into complaints of violation of human rights by a public servant or negligence in the prevention of such violations, the Commission also studies treaties and international instruments on human rights and advises the Government on their recommendations for effective implementation.
