= Raja Muhammed Sarfraz Khan =

Raja Mohammed Sarfraz (1905–1968 C.E.) was a philanthropist, politician and a member of Pakistan Movement.

== Political career ==
Raja Mohammad Sarfraz remained member of the Punjab Legislative Assembly for 29 consecutive years from 1929 to 1958. He was a member of Allama Mashriqi's Khaksar Tehrik.

He started his political career in 1929, when he became an unopposed member of the Punjab Legislative Council from Jehllum rural (Chakwal) constituency.

In 1937, when elections were held under Government of India Act 1935, he was elected as an M.L.A as a member of Unionist party. In 1942, he joined the All India Muslim League, which gave a big boost to the Pakistan Movement in the area.

In 1946 he won his seat for the third time and remained active politician until his retirement. He was also member of the district council and became counsel Chairman in 1942.

== Philanthropic works ==
He patronized many schools, including the Islamia School Chakwal, throughout his life. He also assisted students, widows and orphans. However, his biggest contribution to his district was his role in founding the Government College of Chakwal in 1949 for which he not only gave most central piece of his land, but also donated one hundred thousand rupees, a large amount at that time, and more importantly the main factor behind the Government's decision to select Chakwal as a venue for the College.
