= Unionist Party (Punjab) =

Defunct Indian political party

The Unionist Party was a centre-right political party based in the Punjab Province during the period of British rule in India. The Unionist Party mainly represented the interests of the landed gentry and landlords of Punjab, which included Muslims, Hindus and Sikhs. The Unionists dominated the political scene in Punjab from World War I to the independence of India and the creation of Pakistan after the partition of the province in 1947. The party's leaders served as Prime Minister of the Punjab. The creed of the Unionist Party emphasized: "Dominion Status and a United Democratic federal constitution for India as a whole".

== Organisation ==
The Unionist Party, a secular party, was formed to represent the interests of Punjab's large feudal classes and gentry. Sikandar Hayat Khan, Sir Chhotu Ram, Khizar Hayat Tiwana, Fazli Husain, Shahab-ud-Din and Muhammad Hussain Shah were all members of the party. Although a majority of Unionists were Muslims, a large number of Hindus and Sikhs also supported and participated in the Unionist Party.

In contrast with the Indian National Congress and many other political parties of the time, the Unionist Party did not have a mass-based approach. The Unionists contested elections for the Punjab Legislative Council and the Central Legislative Council at a time when both Congress and the Muslim League had boycotting them. As a result, the Unionist Party dominated the provincial legislature for several years, allowing an elected provincial government to function when other provinces were governed by direct rule.

== Punjab government ==
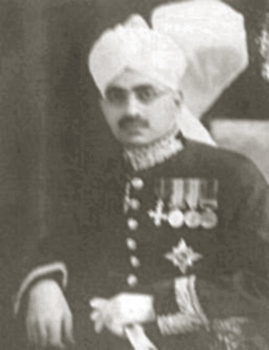
Sir Sikander Hayat Khan

In the 1937 Indian provincial elections, the Unionist Party soundly defeated the Muslim League in Punjab. Unionist Party won 98 seats (out of 175 total), including 78 of the 89 Muslim seats, while the Muslim League won only two. Muslim elements of the Unionists shared many common points with the Muslim League and followed a rather similar policy and agenda for national interests and issues. However, the Unionist Party was virtually an independent political party in the 1920s and 1930s, when the Muslim League was unpopular and divided into feuding factions. The links improved after Muhammad Ali Jinnah became the League's president in the mid-1930s and by October 1937, he was able to convince Sir Sikandar Hayat Khan to come to terms with him via the famous Sikandar-Jinnah Pact.

The rule of Unionist leader Sir Sikandar remained undisputed in the Punjab and he remained the Punjab's Premier (Chief Minister) from 1937 to 1942, in alliance with the Indian National Congress and the Shiromani Akali Dal despite Jinnah's opposition to both parties. Sir Sikandar thus remained the most popular and influential politician in Punjab during his lifetime, preventing both Jinnah and Sir Muhammad Iqbal from gaining the support of a majority of Punjabi Muslims. In the 1946 elections, the Muslim League won 73 of the 89 Muslim seats in Punjab, while the Unionist Party under Khizar Hayat Tiwana won only 13. Overall, the Muslim League failed to win any non-Muslim seat and fell short of the halfway mark of 88 required to form the government, while the Unionist Party won 19 seats in total and formed a short-lived coalition government with Congress (which had won 51 seats) and the Shiromani Akali Dal (which had won 21).

== Decline ==
After the death of Khan in 1942, the party gradually collapsed. Jinnah and his pro-separatist Muslim League demanded of the new leader, Khizar Hayat Khan Tiwana, that the party be re-named "The Muslim League Coalition Party". Reliant on Hindu and Sikh support, Tiwana refused, despite affirming his support for the Pakistan idea and hence opposed the partition of India. As a result, the pro-separatist Muslim League sought to intimidate Tiwana.

The Muslim League's Direct Action Day campaign brought the downfall of Sir Khizar's ministry, which depended on Congress and Akali support; inter-community relations were effectively destroyed as communal violence against Hindus and Muslims across India claimed the lives of tens of thousands of people. With the partition of India in August 1947 into the two independent dominions of India and Pakistan, Punjab was also partitioned with the Muslim-majority West Punjab becoming part of Pakistan and the Hindu-Sikh majority East Punjab forming part of independent India. The Unionist Party's diverse pan-provincial organisation was destroyed, with some Muslim Unionists integrating themselves into the Muslim League; the party ceased to exist in independent India and Pakistan.

== Legacy ==
In Sindh, a Sind United Party modeled on the lines of the Punjab Unionists and represented similar interests. It became the largest party in the province at the 1937 provincial election.

In 2013, guar farmers in Rajasthan formed the National Unionist Zamindara Party (or Zamindara Party) to represent their interests. While there is no connection to the historic Punjab Unionists, the new party honours the legacy of Unionist leaders like Sir Chhotu Ram. The party was successful in winning 2 seats in the 2013 state election.

== See also ==
- Allama Mashriqi
- Khaksar Tehrik
- Majlis-e-Ahrar-ul-Islam
- Syed Ata Ullah Shah Bukhari
