= Sikandar Hayat Khan =

Indian politician and statesman (1892–1942)

Major Sir Khan Bahadur Sikandar Hayat Khan KBE
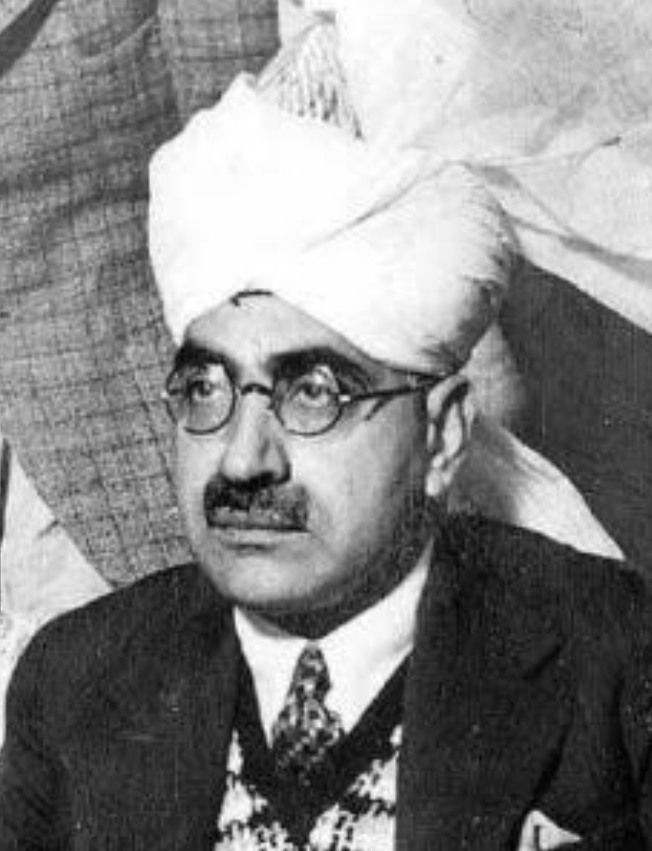
- Khan in 1935

1st Premier of the Punjab
- In office 5 April 1937 – 26 December 1942
- Preceded by: Office established
- Succeeded by: Khizar Hayat Tiwana

Governor of the Punjab (Acting)
- In office 19 July 1932 – 19 October 1932
- Preceded by: Sir Geoffrey Fitzhervey de Montmorency
- Succeeded by: Sir Geoffrey Fitzhervey de Montmorency
- In office 15 February 1934 – 9 June 1934
- Preceded by: Sir Herbert Emerson
- Succeeded by: Sir Herbert Emerson

2nd President of BCCI
- In office 1933–1935
- Preceded by: R. E. Grant Govan
- Succeeded by: Hamidullah Khan

Personal details
- Born: 5 June 1892 Multan, Punjab, British India
- Died: 26 December 1942 (aged 50) Lahore, Punjab, British India
- Party: Unionist Party
- Relations: Liaqat Hayat Khan (brother); Shaukat Hayat Khan (son); Begum Mahmooda Salim Khan (daughter); Tahira Mazhar Ali (daughter); Mazhar Ali Khan (son in law); Tariq Ali (grand son)
- Parent: Nawab Muhammad Hyat Khan (father)
- Education: Punjab University

Military service
- Allegiance: British India
- Branch/service: British Indian Army
- Years of service: 1916–1920
- Rank: Major
- Unit: 67th Punjabis
- Battles/wars: World War I Third Anglo-Afghan War

Khan Bahadur Sir Sikandar Hayat Khan, KBE (also spelt Sikandar Hyat-Khan or Sikandar Hyat Khan; 5 June 1892 – 26 December 1942) was a British Indian politician and statesman from the Punjab Province who served as the Premier of the Punjab, among other positions.

== Early life ==
Sikandar Hayat Khan was born in Multan, Punjab, British Raj in a Punjabi family from the Khattar tribe. His father was Nawab Muhammad Hayat Khan, a civil servant and a close associate of Sir Syed Ahmed Khan, and his grandfather was Sardar Karam Khan, who died in battle fighting for the British against the Sikhs in the Second Anglo-Sikh War.

He was educated at Oriental Collegiate High School in Aligarh and later at Aligarh Muslim University, and was sent to study medicine at King's College London in the United Kingdom but was recalled home by his family circa 1915.

During the First World War, he initially worked as a War Recruitment Officer in his native Attock District and later served as one of the first Indian officers to receive the King's Commission, with the 2/67th Punjabis (later the 1/2nd Punjab Regiment) where he was sent to the Western Front in France. As a result of his distinguished services in the Great War and later, the Third Afghan War, he was appointed a Member of the Order of the British Empire, Military Division (MBE, Mil.) by the Government of British India.

After 1920, Khan turned his talents to business and by dint of his financial acumen and managerial skills, soon became a director or managing director of several companies, including the Wah Tea Estate, The Amritsar-Kasur Railway Company, The People's Bank of Northern India, The Sialkot-Narowal Railway, The ACC Wah Portland Cement Company, the Wah Stone and Lime Company, Messrs. Owen Roberts, the Punjab Sugar Corporation Ltd, Messrs. Walter Locke & Co, The Lahore Electricity Supply Co and many others. He also entered grassroots politics at this time, and remained an honorary magistrate and Chairman of the Attock District Board.

Later, for a brief while he also remained the acting deputy-governor of the newly established Reserve Bank of India in 1935, prior to returning to take on party leadership in the Punjab in 1936.

== Later life and career ==
In 1921, Khan was elected to the Punjab Legislative Council and his effective political role now began, as he became one of the main leaders of the Punjab Unionist Party (later known as the Unionist Party), an all-Punjab political party formed to represent the interests of the landed gentry and landlords of Punjab which included Muslims, Sikhs and Hindus.

After an outstanding period of political enterprise between 1924 and 1934, he was appointed a Knight Commander of the Order of the British Empire, Civil Division (KBE) in the 1933 New Year Honours list. he in due course took over leadership of the Unionist Party from Sir Fazli Husein. Khan led his party to victory in the 1937 elections, held under the Government of India Act 1935, and then governed the Punjab as Premier in coalition with the Sikh Akali Dal and the Indian National Congress. When Khan was the Unionist Premier, he extended the offer of Parliamentary Secretaryship to Ghazanfar Ali Khan, who became a strong backer of the Unionist Party in the assembly. This government carried out many reforms for the better of the Punjabi zamindar or agrarian community. When Indian farmers faced a crash of agricultural prices and economic distress in the late 1930s, Khan took further measures to alleviate their misery in the Punjab – similar steps were also taken by A. K. Fazlul Huq, the Premier of Bengal, in working to relieve the Bengali peasantry from crippling debts to private sources, using both legal and administrative measures.

Khan opposed the Quit India Movement of 1942, and supported the Allied Powers during World War II. Khan believed in co-operating politically with the British for the independence of India and the unity of Punjab.

In 1937, soon after winning the general elections, confronted by internal pressure from many of his Muslim parliamentary colleagues and conscious of the need to maintain a balanced, equitable stance in a volatile and much-divided Punjabi political milieu, Khan decided to also negotiate with the Muslim elements under the leadership of Muhammad Ali Jinnah.

Khan and Jinnah signed the Jinnah-Sikandar Pact at Lucknow in October 1937, merging the Muslim elements of his powerful Unionist force with the All India Muslim League, as a move towards reconciling the various Muslim elements in the Punjab and elsewhere in India, towards a common, united front for safeguarding their community rights and interests. Within the agreement, Khan announced he was "advising all the Muslim members of the Unionist Party in Punjab to join the League." Later, he was also one of the chief supporters and architects of the Lahore Resolution of March 1940, calling for an autonomous or semi-independent Muslim majority region within the larger Indian confederation. Sikandar Hayat Khan, however, opposed the partition of India and condemned "any reference to the 'Lahore Resolution' as the 'Pakistan Resolution'." To Khan, the "partition meant disrupting the Punjab and the Unionist Party, and he was not prepared to accept this".

Khan's final days as Punjab's premier were extremely troublesome and marred by controversies and bitterness: since 1940 the Khaksars had been constantly giving trouble; he was having a rough time within the Muslim League with Malik Barkat Ali and others; and in the Legislative Assembly Bhai Parmanand and Master Tara Singh were questioning his increasingly inconsistent stance over Pakistan and Punjabi unity. Khan's legacy was challenged when Malik Khizar Hayat refused to comply with League demands in 1944, leading Jinnah to repeal the Sikandar-Jinnah Pact from 1937. Trying to yoke together an impossible 'political mosaic' took a drastic toll on Khan's health, probably resulting in his early fatality. In a letter from Viceroy Linlithgow to Sir Leo Amery dated two days after Khan's death, the Viceroy offered a lengthy personal evaluation of Khan:

The real tragedy of the last couple days has been the sudden death of Sikandar. He had his faults, as you and I well know. He was a rather difficult person to rely on in a really tight corner, and on more than one occasion he had caused me serious embarrassment. But he had a really remarkable record of achievement, and his services both to the Punjab and to India were very great indeed... I always felt... that he had an extremely difficult hand to play in the Punjab and that was the most probable explanation of his apparent weakness. He has with great skill for a number of years kept together a delicate political mosaic and I am by no means [untroubled] as I write at the thought of what may happen, for Sikandar was well-known to be very non-communal in temper and outlook, and he had conciliated a far greater degree of general support in that most important Province than anyone whom I can think of as a possible successor is likely to manage to do.

Khan died on the night between 25/26 December 1942, of a sudden heart failure, at his home. He is buried at the footsteps of the Badshahi Masjid in Lahore.

== Legacy ==
Among Khan's children, the following attained noteworthy public status:

- Begum Mahmooda Salim Khan, Pakistan's first woman minister
- Shaukat Hayat Khan, senior Muslim League leader and political figure. Remained MNA in the 1970s Assembly and as a opposition MNA played an important role for the drafting and approval of 1973s Pakistan constitution.
- Tahira Mazhar Ali, socialist leader and public activist
- Izzet Hayat Khan, businessman and former Pakistani ambassador to Tunisia

Among his grandchildren are Tariq Ali, the British-Pakistani socialist writer and Yawar Hayat Khan, former senior director/producer of PTV (Pakistan Television). Another grandson Sardar Sikandar Hayat, eldest son of Sardar Shaukat Hayat Khan participated actively in constituent politics and remained MPA twice from Fatehjang (Attock) and also served as provincial minister.

Among his great-grandchildren is the noted Pakistani poet and scholar Omer Tarin.

== See also ==
- Premier of the Punjab
