= Chak 234 GB =

- Union Council
- 235 GB Panj Pulla
- Location within Punjab, Pakistan Location within Pakistan
- Coordinates: 31°24′33.5″N 73°30′21.5″E
- Country: Pakistan
- Province: Punjab
- District: Faisalabad District
- Administrative divisions: Jaranwala Tehsil
- Elevation: 184 m (604 ft)

Population (2017 Census)
  - Total: 3,786
- Time zone: UTC+5 (PST)
- Calling code: 041

Chak 234 GB Panj Pulla also called Chak 234 GB PATIALA is a village located between Chak 235 GB Partab Garh and Chak 233 GB Kot Barseer in Tehsil Jaranwala district Faisalabad, Pakistan. There is one Govt Girls Community Model School for girls and a primary school for boys in the village. There is also one private school namely Garrison Public School providing quality education to the community. There is also rail station Panj Pulla meaning five bridges on Shorkot–Sheikhupura Branch Line.

This village is far from main Jaranwala-Nankana Road. There is daily bus service from Jaranwala to 234 GB via Chak 236 GB Kilanwala.

== See also ==
- Government Islamia High School Jaranwala
