= Tararn Wala =

Tararn Wala تارڑانوالہ
- Village
- Chak # 237 GB
- Location within Punjab, Pakistan Location within Pakistan
- Coordinates: 31°22′10″N 73°27′35″E
- Country: Pakistan
- Province: Punjab
- Division: Faisalabad
- District: Faisalabad
- Tehsil: Jaranwala
- Town: Jaranwala
- Time zone: UTC+5 (PST)
- Postal Code: 37250
- Calling Code: 041

Tararn Wala (Chak 237 GB) (in Urdu تارڑانوالہ ) is a village of Jaranwala Tehsil, Punjab, Pakistan. This village is on Gogera Branch Canal. Punjabi is the native language, and Urdu is also widely used. Major castes in this village include Gurjar, Arain, Rajput, and Jat (Tarar). Adjacent village is Chak 236 GB Kilanwala
