= Tiwana family of Shahpur =

Punjabi Muslim feudal family

The Tiwana family of Shahpur is a prominent Punjabi Muslim feudal family which claims Parmar Rajput decent. It is among the largest landowning families in Punjab, and its members have held significant influence in Punjabi politics politics since the 17th century.

In 1862, the Shahpur District was administered by Malik Sahib Khan Tiwana and Council Member Mehar Khan Tiwana. Notable descendants of the family include:

- Malik Umar Hayat Khan Tiwana, a former Major General in the British Indian Army;
- Malik Khizar Hayat Tiwana the former Premier of united Punjab during British rule;
- Major Ishaq Tiwana, a pre-Partition officer in the Royal Indian Army known for his horse-riding skills, integrity, and valour;
- Mr. Razzaq Tiwana, the current Numberdar of Shahpur and a retired bureaucrat;
- Chief Engineer Mumtaz Tiwana, a former Commander in the Merchant Navy;
- Aasim Tiwana, a senior bureaucrat and current affairs anchor on national media;
- Malik Khuda Buksh Tiwana, a former provincial minister;
- Malik Ghulam Muhammad Tiwana and Malik Ehsan Ullah Tiwana, both former Members of the National Assembly (MNAs);
- Ms. Sidra Tiwana, a federal bureaucrat of Pakistan.

Other notable members of the Tiwana clan from Shahpur include:

- Khaliq Yar Tiwana, a deceased officer who served in both the Army and Police;
- Asim Yar Tiwana, a fashion designer;
- Shoukat Tiwana, a retired senior officer from the Prisons Department;
- Shahzadi Umerzadi Tiwana, a former minister and the daughter of Sir Khizar Hayat Tiwana and granddaughter of General Omar Hayat Tiwana;
- Major Islam Tiwana, a former officer in the Pakistan Army infantry.

== Background ==
=== Origins ===
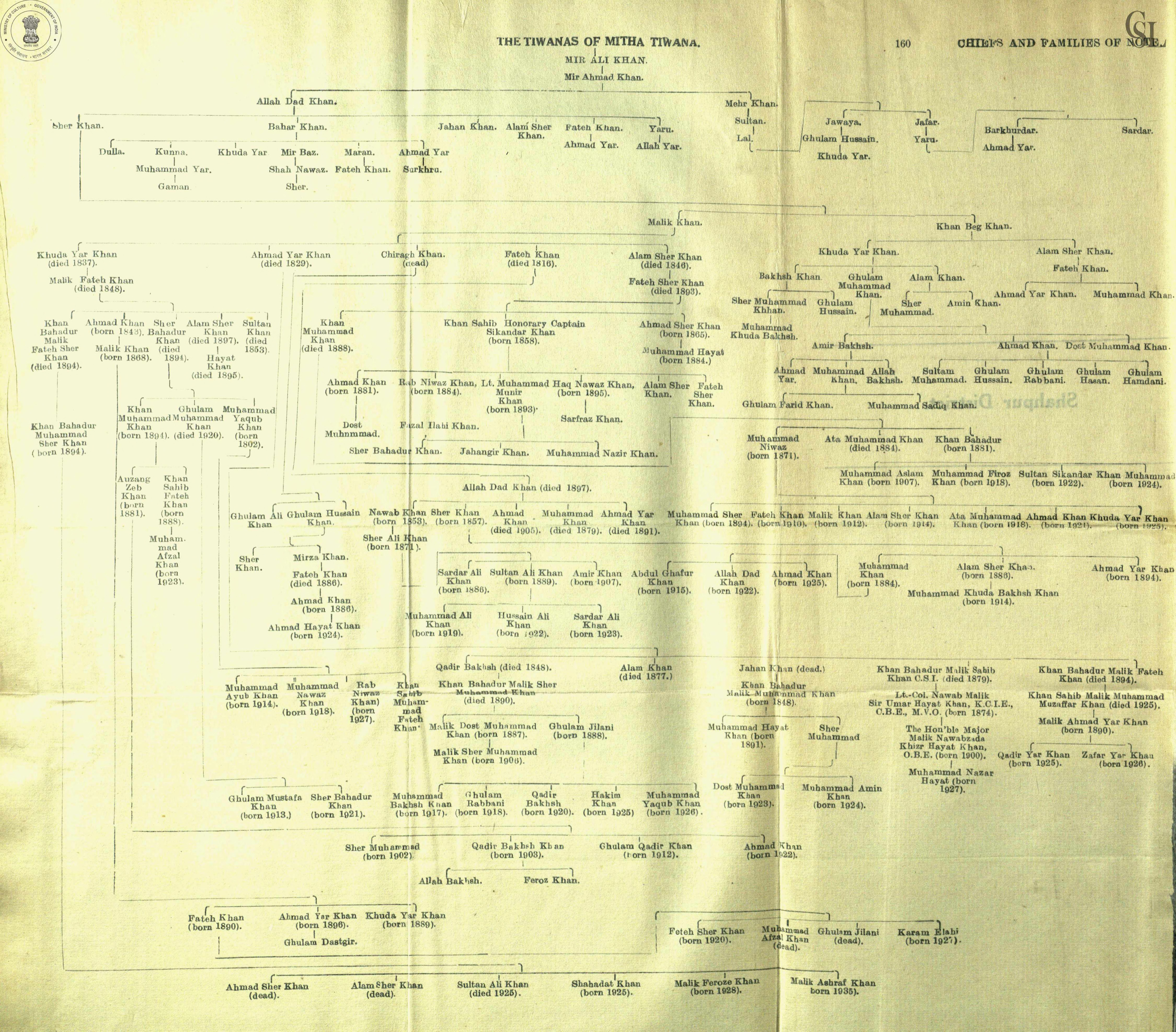
Genealogical pedigree (family-tree) of the Tiwana family of Mitha Tiwana, Punjab, revised pedigree-table (1940)

Mir Ali Khan, the founder of the Tiwana family, settled in Okhali Mohallah, located in the present-day Khushab District, during the mid-17th century. Around 1680, his son Mir Ahmad Khan established the town of Mitha Tiwana.

=== 18th century ===
Mir Ahmad Khan's successors, Dadu Khan and Sher Khan, continued the development of Mitha Tiwana, transforming it into a flourishing town in the region. Sher Khan significantly expanded his territory at the expense of neighbouring Awan tribes and refused to pay tribute to the provincial governors at Dera Ismail Khan. In 1745, he founded the village of Nurpur Tirwana.

Sher Khan later rebelled against Inayat Khan of the Jhang Sials, who had earlier appointed him as administrator of the village of Mari. He expelled the Sials from Khai and laid siege to Kot Langar Khan. However, Inayat Khan dispatched an army to lift the siege and defeated Sher Khan. Sher Khan died in 1757, leaving behind two sons: Khan Muhammad Khan and Khan Beg Khan.

Khan Beg Khan usurped his elder brother Khan Muhammad Khan as chief while the latter was away in Jhang visiting relatives. Upon his return, Khan Muhammad raised an army from Nurpur Tirwana, defeated Khan Beg, and imprisoned him.

Khan Muhammad Khan was frequently engaged in conflicts with neighbouring chiefs. He launched an attack on Lal Khan, the Chief of Khushab, bombarded the town, and reportedly tied prisoners to cannons to divert enemy fire. Lal Khan sought help from Mahan Singh Sukharchakia, an old friend of Khan Muhammad, who arrived with a large force, compelling Khan Muhammad to retreat.

=== Sikh Empire ===
Towards the end of his reign, Khan Beg once again took up arms against his brother Khan Muhammad. In 1803, Khan Muhammad agreed to pay a subsidy of one lakh rupees to Maharajah Ranjit Singh in exchange for support in defeating Khan Beg. Although this led to a victory over his brother, Khan Muhammad was compelled by his son, Ahmad Yar Khan, to relinquish the chiefship in 1804.

In 1817, Maharaja Ranjit Singh dispatched a force under Misr Diwan Chand against Ahmad Yar Khan. Ahmad Yar Khan submitted to the Maharaja's authority and was granted the jagir of Jhawrian, valued at approximately ten thousand rupees. In 1819, Hari Singh Nalwa was granted the jagir of Mitha Tiwana.

In 1821, Ahmad Yar Khan joined the Maharaja in a campaign against his old adversary, the Nawab of Mankera. Impressed by the performance of the Tiwana Horse, the Maharaja insisted that a troop of fifty horsemen accompany him back to Lahore. Ahmad Yar Khan's brother, Khuda Yar Khan, was appointed rough rider to the Maharaja and oversaw his hunting expeditions until his death in 1837.

Khuda Yar Khan's son, Fateh Khan, rose to prominence initially under Hari Singh Nalwa, and later through the patronage of Raja Dhyan Singh. He played a role in the assassination of Pashaura Singh, alongside Chattar Singh Attariwalla. Fateh Khan was killed at the outbreak of the Second Anglo-Sikh War by mutineers at his fort in Dalipnagar, located in Bannu.

=== British India ===
Several members of the Tiwana family gained recognition for their support during the Indian Rebellion of 1857. Malik Fateh Khan Tiwana rendered services in Hissar and Jhajjar, while his cousin Sher Muhammad Khan provided assistance in the Doaba, Oudh, and Bareilly regions. Both were rewarded with jagirs and conferred the title of Khan Bahadur.

Another family member, Sahib Khan, was also granted the title of Khan Bahadur. He received nearly 9,000 acres of land in Kalpi and a jagir valued at ₹1,200. Sahib Khan's son, Umar Hayat Khan, became a decorated officer in the British Indian Army and was later elected to the Council of the Secretary of State for India. His son, Khizar Hayat Tiwana, went on to become the last Premier of the Punjab during British rule.

== List of Nawab of Shahpur ==
The Nawabs of Shahpur were hereditary rulers traditionally assisted by a council of local elders. While the records of early rulers remain uncertain, verifiable details are available from approximately 1650 onwards.

Reign	Nawab of Shahpur
1650-1675	Mir Ali Khan Tiwana
1675-1732	Mir Ahmad Khan Tiwana
1732-1740	Malik Dadu Khan Tiwana
1740–1757	Malik Sher Khan Tiwana
1757-1804	Khan Muhammad Khan Tiwana
1804–1837	Ahmad Yar Khan Tiwana
1837-1879	Malik Sahib Khan Tiwana
1879–1944	Malik Umar Hayat Khan Tiwana
1944–1975	Malik Khizar Hayat Tiwana
1975–2015	Malik Nazar Hayat Tiwana
2015–present	Malik Umar Hayat Tiwana - Umar II

== Notable family members ==
- Khan Bahadur Malik Fateh Khan Tiwana – Politician during the Sikh era.
- Khan Bahadur Malik Sahib Khan Tiwana – Army officer and large landowner; nephew of Malik Fateh Khan Tiwana.
- Sir Umar Hayat Khan Tiwana – Member of the Council of the Secretary of State for India; son of Malik Sahib Khan Tiwana.
- Sir Khizar Hayat Tiwana – Last Premier of the Punjab during British India; son of Malik Umar Hayat Khan Tiwana.
- Shahzadi Umerzadi Tiwana – Politician; daughter of Malik Khizar Hayat Tiwana.
- Saeed Tiwana – Retired Major in the Pakistan Army; recipient of the Sitara-e-Jurat.
- Malik Mehar Khan Tiwana – Council Member and Numberdar in 1862.
- Malik Razaq Tiwana – Retired bureaucrat; Numberdar of Shahpur since 1975.
- Aasim Tiwana – Senior bureaucrat.
- Azam Tiwana – Retired Chief Security Officer, Airport Security Force.
- Ghulam Jillani Tiwana – Officer in the Police Service of Pakistan (PSP); served as District Police Officer (DPO) in Punjab.
- Usman Tiwana – Scientific Officer, Government of Pakistan.
- Amjad Zubir Tiwana – Former Chairman, Federal Board of Revenue (FBR).
- Muhammad Zafar Tiwana – Retired Deputy Director, FESCO (WAPDA), as of October 2023.
