= Chak 235 GB Partab Garh =

Chak 235 GB
- Union Council
- 235 GB Partap Garah
- Location within Punjab, Pakistan Location within Pakistan
- Coordinates: 31°23′36.9″N 73°29′23.3″E
- Country: Pakistan
- Province: Punjab
- District: Faisalabad District
- Administrative divisions: Jaranwala Tehsil
- Elevation: 184 m (604 ft)

Population (2017 Census)
  - Total: 3,6092,017
- Time zone: UTC+5 (PST)
- Calling code: 041

Chak 235 GB Partap Garah (Urdu چک نمبر 235 گ ب پرتاپ گڑھ ) is a village and union council located next to Chak 236 GB Kilanwala in Jaranwala tehsil, Faisalabad district, Pakistan.

== See also ==
- Government Islamia High School Jaranwala
