= Anihar =

- Village
- Location in Punjab, India Anihar (India)
- Coordinates: 31.1348712°N 75.8178627°E
- Country: India
- State: Punjab
- District: Jalandhar
- Tehsil: Phillaur
- Elevation: 246 m (807 ft)

Population (2011)
  - Total: 1,030
- Sex ratio 517/513 ♂/♀

Languages
  - Official: Punjabi
- Time zone: UTC+5:30 (IST)
- PIN: 144418
- Telephone code: 01826
- ISO 3166 code: IN-PB
- Vehicle registration: PB 37
- Post office: Bara Pind
- Website: jalandhar.nic.in

Anihar (also spelled as Aneehar) is a village in Phillaur tehsil of Jalandhar District of Punjab State, India. It is located 6.4 km away from postal head office Bara Pind. The village is 10 km away from Goraya, 35 km from Jalandhar, and 125 km from state capital Chandigarh and 165 km from Wahga Border of Pakistan-India. The village is administrated by a sarpanch who is an elected representative of village as per Panchayati raj (India).

Before partition, it was a Muslim-dominated village. At the time of partition of India, Muslims of this village migrated to a village Chak 236 GB Kilanwala in Jaranwala in Punjab, Pakistan.

== Caste ==
The village has population of 1,030 and in the village most of the villagers are from schedule caste (SC) which has constitutes 73.40% of total population of the village and it doesn't have any Schedule Tribe (ST) population.

== Transport ==
=== Rail ===
The nearest train station is situated 9.8 km away in Goraya, and Ludhiana Jn Railway Station is 34.7 km away from the village.

=== Air ===
The nearest domestic airport is 50 km away in Ludhiana and the nearest international airport is 129 km away in Amritsar other nearest international airport is located in Chandigarh.
