= Aminabad Noon =

Village in Sargodha District, Punjab, Pakistan

- Village
- Location in Pakistan
- Country: Pakistan
- Province: Punjab
- District: Sargodha
- Tehsil: Bhalwal

Population (2017 Pakistani census)
  - Total: 832

Aminabad or Aminabad Noon is a village of Shahpur Tehsil in Sargodha District, Punjab, Pakistan.

Population of the village per 2017 Pakistani census is 832 with 104 households.

It is located at an altitude of 166 metres (547 feet).
