= Faisalabad–Jaranwala Road =

Road in Punjab, Pakistan

- فیصل آباد– جڑانوالہ سڑک

Route information
- Maintained by Punjab Highway Department
- Length: 36 km (22 mi)

Major junctions
- From: Amtex Square, Faisalabad; Abdullahpur
- To: Jaranwala

Location
- Country: Pakistan

Highway system
- Roads in Pakistan

Faisalabad–Jaranwala Road (Punjabi, Urdu: فیصل آباد– جڑانوالہ سڑک), also known locally as Jaranwala Road is a provincially maintained road in Punjab connecting the cities of Faisalabad and Jaranwala. In 2020, the road was in need of repair to facilitate smooth travel.

== Salient features ==
Length: 36 km

Lanes: 4 lanes

Speed limit: Universal minimum speed limit of 60 km/h and a maximum speed limit of 80 km/h for heavy transport vehicles and 100 km/h for light transport vehicles.

== Main Bus stops ==
- Dhudiwala
- Makuana
- Muhammad Wala
- Sain Di Khui
- 109 Phatak
- Awagat
