= Mission High School =

Mission High School may refer to:

- Mission High School (San Francisco, California), a public high school in the San Francisco Unified School District (SFUSD) San Francisco, California
- Mission High School (Mission, Texas), a secondary school located in Mission, Texas
- Mission Continuation High School (Los Angeles)
- San Gabriel Mission High School, an all-girls Catholic College Preparatory high school
- Mission San Jose High School, Fremont, California
- Mission High School, Rawalpindi
