= Ram Garh, Pakistan =

Ram Garh
- Location within Pakistan
- Coordinates: 31.18°N 73.17°E
- Country: Pakistan
- Elevation: 177 m (581 ft)

Population (1998)
  - Total: 27,915
- Time zone: UTC+5 (PST)

Ram Garh is a village of Jaranwala Tehsil in Faisalabad District, Punjab, Pakistan. It is located at 31°18'0N 73°17'0E at an altitude of 177 metres (583 feet). The village is part of union council 37 of Jaranwala with a population of 4,214.
