= Nand Lal =

Indian freedom fighter and politician (1887–1959)

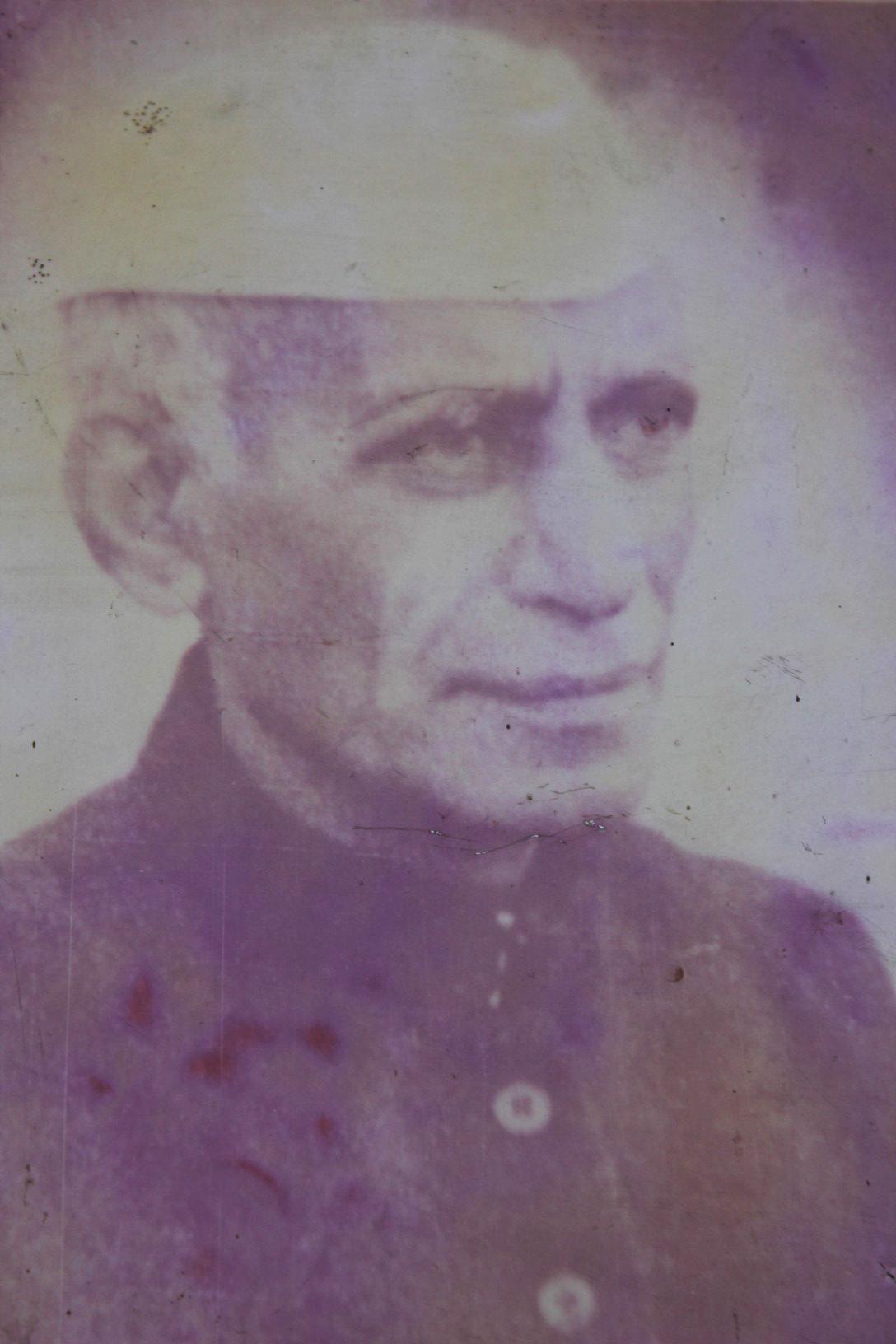
- Master Nand Lal

Personal details
- Born: 1 January 1887 Maghiana, Jhang, Punjab, Pakistan
- Died: 17 April 1959 (aged 72)
- Party: Indian National Congress
- Parents: Shri Kala Ram (father); Shrimati Rami Bai (mother)
- Education: KGC Hindu High School, Jhang, Pakistan

Master Nand Lal
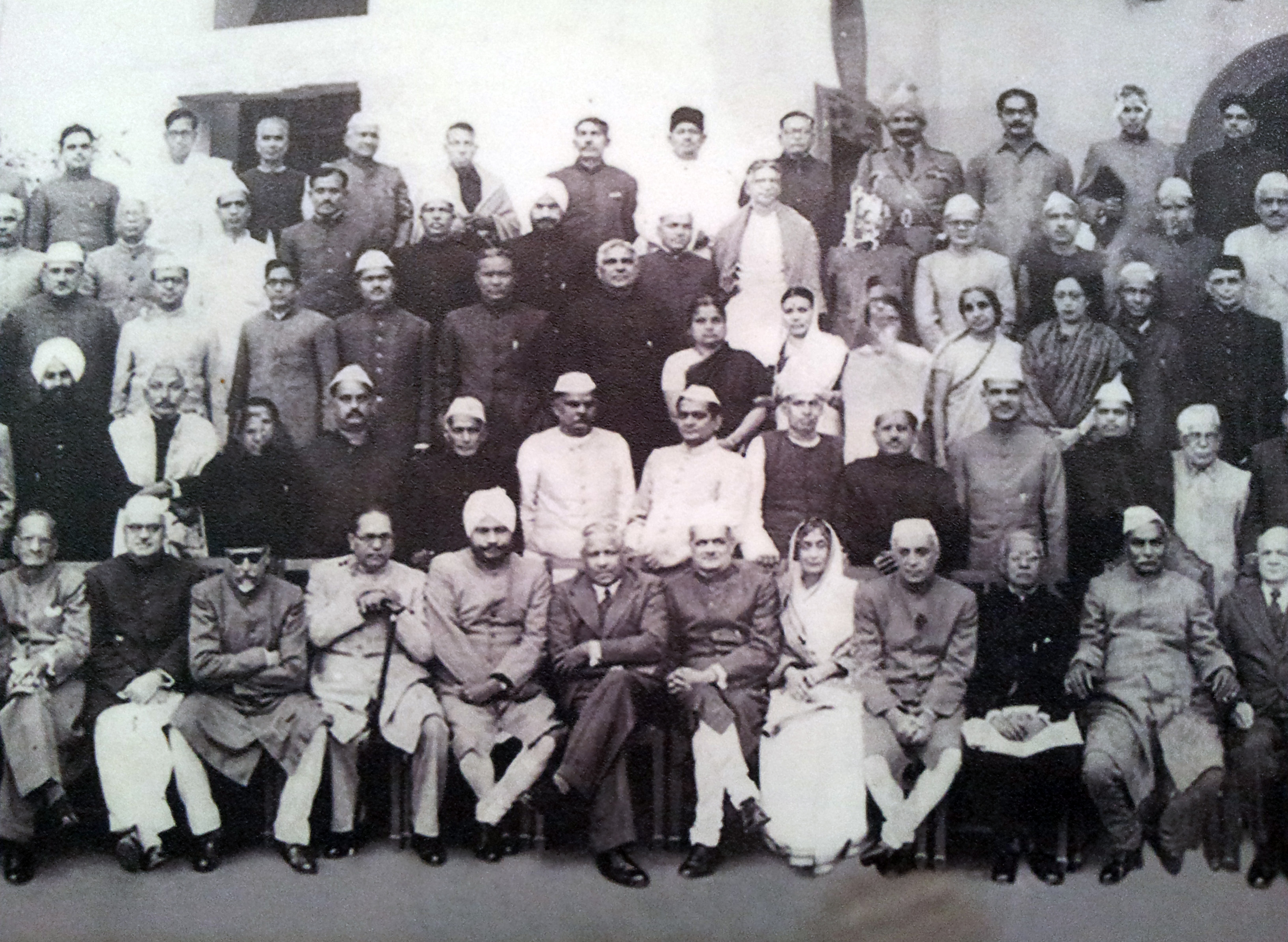
- Master Nand Lal fifth from left, second row from bottom. Nehru fourth from right, Ambedkar fourth from left in bottom row.

Assembly Member for East Punjab

Master Nand Lal (Hindi: मास्टर नंद लाल; 1 January 1887 – 17 April 1959), also referred to as Nanadlal of Jaranwala, was an Indian freedom fighter, politician and a member of the Constituent Assembly of India from East Punjab.

== Early life ==
Nand Lal was born in 1887 and was the only son of his father Shri Kala Ram and mother Shrimati Rami Bai. He had a sister who was 6–7 years younger than him. Shri Kala Ram worked as a petition writer in the Fazilka and Firozpur districts of Punjab, India, and died in 1899 when Nand was 12 years old.

After his father's death, Shrimati Rami Bai, Nand's mother, took care of Nand and ensured a comfortable upbringing for her two children. Nand passed his 10th grade exams from KGC Hindu High School in Jhang, Pakistan, in 1904, following which he was appointed as a clerk in the Deputy Commissioner's Office at Lyallpur where his uncle was already working in the revenue department. However, Nand resigned from the post soon after, due to the corruption taking place there. He started preparing for the post of petition writer at Shahpur. He passed that exam, becoming a petitions writer and started his work in the town of Bhalwal.

== Acting career ==
Nand Lal was always keen on drama and theatre, performing the role of the character Kanut in a drama During his fifth standard in school. Always enthusiastic to take part in political and religious dramas, he later wrote the Ramayan in a drama form and organized a play on the same on navratras and Dussehra festivals. Along with performing the role of Dashrath in the play, he was the director of those plays, earning the moniker "Master Ji".

In 1909, Lala Banke, a well-known freedom fighter and editor of the newspaper Jhang Sayal, came into contact with Master Ji in Jhang. This incident proved to be a turning point in his life.

== Political life ==
In 1911, he moved from Bhalwal to Jaranwala in the district of Lyallpur, where he started working as a petition writer, and began considering seriously his political ideologies. In 1919, he went to Haridwar with some of his friends, and came across, Kana Bali, a female leader, giving a public lecture in support of Gandhi's call against the Rowlatt Act. This had a great impact on Master Ji's mind, who was so impressed that he fasted on her appeal.

Subsequently, he witnessed Anti-Rowlatt Act protests gaining ground, mass hartals and non-violent satyagrahas, and this period of his life proved a milestone in shaping his political ideology as well his intent to participate in the National Movement actively.

After returning home to Jaranwala from Haridwar he organized a public meeting to chalk out a political programme. Public processions, strikes and satyagraha methods were followed, including boycotting foreign cloth in favor of Khadi in support of the ongoing Non-Cooperation Movement. When Martial Law was proclaimed in Punjab against protestors, Master Ji was arrested in April 1919 and sentenced to 18 months of Rigorous Imprisonment. He was released early in January 1920 on grounds of general amnesty.

During the Nagpur Session of the Indian National Congress in December 1920, some crucial changes were made in its organizational setup, following which the first Congress Committee was formed at Jaranwala of which Master Nand Lal became the General Secretary. Subsequently, he became a member of the Punjab Congress Committee, and General Secretary to the District Congress Committee as well. Later, he also served as the District Congress Committee's President for about three years. He remained a member of the All India Congress Committee from 1925 to 1957.

In the coming years, he partook in all major National Congress-led struggles including protesting against the Simon Commission, the Civil Disobedience Movement and mobilized local public opinion through frequent meetings and processions. He was also highly active in taking up local issues and grievances. He was arrested in 1930 after he led a "jatha" (procession) in defiance of the Salt Act during the Civil Disobedience Movement.

Master Ji was present at the historic AICC meeting at Bombay, where the Quit India Resolution was passed on 8 August 1942. He was arrested upon his return on 14 August and remained at Multan and Sialkot jails for the next three years. A few months after his release he was again arrested in July 1945 for defying restrictions and continuing political activity.

Between 1919 and 1947, Master Nand Lal was imprisoned for nearly 11 years in various jails at Lahore, Multan, Sialkot, Dera Ghazi Khan, Ferozepur, Rawalpindi, etc.

== Election to the Constituent Assembly ==
During the partition, Master Ji, along with his family, moved to India in September 1947, in order to avoid the riots in Jaranwala, and settled at Panipat in November.

Master Ji initially lived with a Muslim family, Panipat still being home to a number of them. A "Basau committee" was formed to help the incoming refugees, and Master Nand Lal was appointed as its President. He also contributed, among other things, by helping bring the Model Town and Industrial Area Schemes to Panipat.

Following the advice and support of some close friends and political leaders, Master Nand Lal applied for the reserved seats in the Constituent Assembly for the Hindu community. He was one of the two candidates elected by the Provincial Legislative Assembly and became a member in March 1948, and subsequently of the Provisional Parliament until 1952.

== Later political life ==
He stood for the first General Election of the country in 1951-52, defeating Jan Sangh candidate, Dr. Gokul Chand Narang, vice-president of the All India Hindu Mahasabha, and became the first MLA from Karnal. He did not participate in 1957 elections due to failing health and old age. Nevertheless, he helped organize the election campaign with the Congress candidate, winning by a wide margin. Lal died on 17 April 1959.

== Sources ==
- Congress Hand-book by Indian National Congress. All India Congress Committee - 1946 - Page 10
- Debates: Official report by Punjab (India). Legislature. Legislative Assembly - 1960
- Unsung Torch Bearers: Punjab Congress Socialists in Freedom ...by K. L. Johar - 1991
- Parliament of India Who's who - 1950 - Page 76
- Devi Lal: A Critical Appraisal by Jugal Kishore Gupta - 1997- Page 93
- Young India by Mahatma Gandhi - 1930- Volume 12 - Page 296
- Indian Annual Register - Volume 1 -1939- Page 305
- Punjab Through the Ages -2007- Page 373
- Early Aryans to Swaraj by S.R. Bakshi, S.G - 2005- Page 385
- Dr. Satyapal, the hero of freedom movement in the Punjab by Shailja Goyal - 2004- Page 197
- Civil Disobedience Movement in the Punjab: 1930 - 34 - by D. R. Grover - 1987 Page 306
- Struggle for independence: Indian freedom fighters. Jawahar Lal Nehru by Shiri Ram Bakshi - 1992
- History Of Indian National Congress (1885–2002) by Deep Chand Bandhu - 2003- Page 114
- Evidence Taken Before the Disorders Inquiry Committee by India. Disorders Inquiry Committee - 1920
