= Jassuana =

- Village
- Chak No. 56/GB
- Location within Pakistan
- Coordinates: 30°53′05″N 72°26′25″E
- Country: Pakistan
- Province: Punjab
- District: Faisalabad
- Time zone: UTC+5 (PST)

Chak No. 56/GB Jassuana is a village 10 km from Jaranwala on Satiana Road in Faisalabad District, Punjab, Pakistan.

== Demographics ==
The population of the village, according to the 2017 census was 2,207.
