= Malik Munir Khan Tiwana =

Pakistani brigadier (born 1894)

Brigadier Malik Mohammad Munir Khan Tiwana
- Born: Malik Mohammad Munir Khan Tiwana; July 2, 1894; Punjab, British India
- Relatives: Khizar Hayat Tiwana (cousin)
- Military career
- Branch: British Indian Army (1917–1947); Pakistan Army (1947–1949)
- Service years: 1917–1949
- Rank: Brigadier
- Unit: 19th Lancers
- Conflicts: World War I; World War II; Arakan Campaign 1944-1945

Malik Mohammad Munir Khan Tiwana was a Pakistani retired one-star rank officer with service in the British Indian Army from 1917 to 1947 and later the Pakistan Army.

== Early life ==
Tiwana was born on 2 July 1894. He belonged to the Tiwana family of Punjab and was a first cousin of Khizar Hayat Khan Tiwana.

== Military career ==
=== British Indian Army (1917–1947) ===
In 1917, Tiwana enlisted as a sapper in the Punjab University Signals Section. He was promoted to the rank of Jemadar after only seven months of service. In World War I, he served in Mesopotamia. In 1918, while serving as a Viceroy's Commissioned Officer (VCO) commanding the Punjab University Signals Section, he relieved a British signals unit operating in the oil field region of the area.

Tiwana received his education at the Temporary School for Indian Cadets, Daly College, Indore, in 1919, where he was a contemporary of K. M. Cariappa and A. A. Rudra. He was one of eleven Muslim cadets commissioned from that school on 17 July 1920, and was commissioned into the 19th Lancers. After several years of service, he chose to transfer to the Special Unemployed List. After the outbreak of World War II, he returned to military service and was appointed to command the 8 Garrison Company.

As a Lieutenant Colonel, Tiwana commanded the 22 Indian Pioneer Group and participated in the Arakan Campaign in 1944. He also served as station commander in the region and administered an area of approximately 66 miles and oversaw more than 80 military units.

From June 1944 to February 1946, he served as Deputy Adviser to the Civil Pioneer Force of the Labour Department of the Government of India. In May 1946, he was appointed Morale Liaison Officer at General Headquarters. In May 1947, he was promoted to the rank of Brigadier and given command of the Kamptee Sub-Area.

=== Pakistan Army (1947–1949) ===
Following the Partition of British India in August 1947, Tiwana joined the Pakistan Army as one of five officers from the Indore cadet school still serving at independence. He retired in 1949, before the Pakistan Army began issuing PA service numbers in 1950, and so was never allotted one.
