= Jhawarian =

Jhawarian جھاوَریاں
- Town
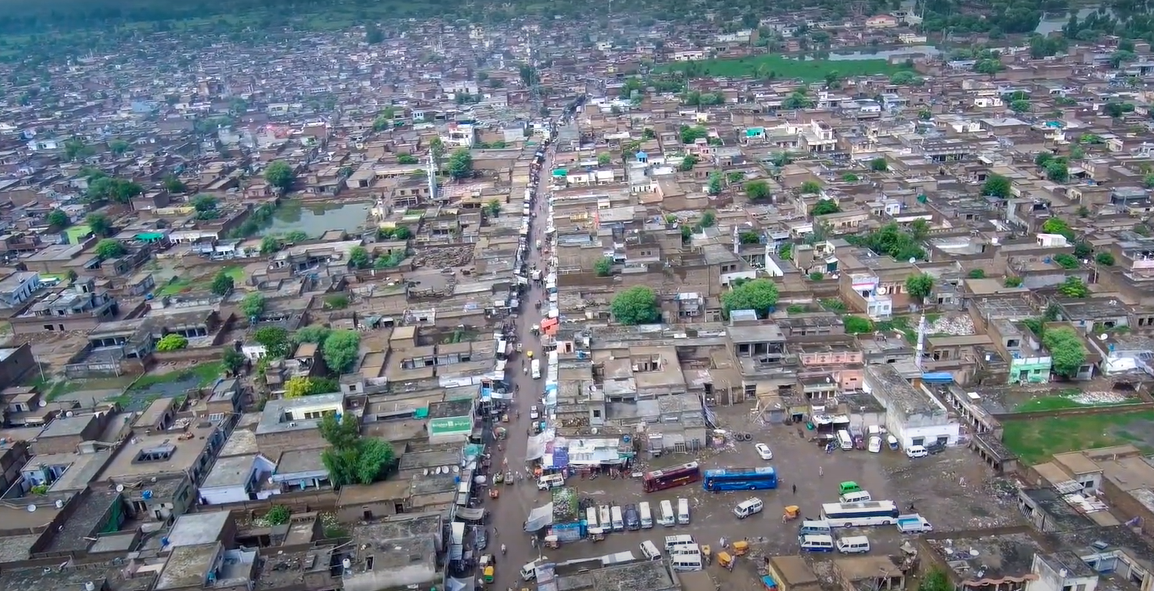
- An aerial view of Jhawarian

- Location within Punjab, Pakistan Location within Pakistan
- Coordinates: 32°21′18.3″N 72°37′29.9″E
- Country: Pakistan
- Province: Punjab
- Division: Sargodha
- District: Sargodha

Population (2023)
  - Total: 36,437
- Postal code: 40350

Jhawarian is a town located near the Jhelum River in Shahpur Tehsil of Sargodha District in the Punjab province of Pakistan.

== History ==
The town of Jhawarian, with origins dating back six hundred years, was established by the Bhatti Rajput tribe who migrated from Pindi Bhattian. The agricultural possibilities of the place and the proximity of the river made it suitable for settlement. The name "Jhawarian" is believed to have multiple possible origins. One scholarly interpretation suggests that it is derived from "Joharian," stemming from the word "Johar" (meaning jewel or gem), attributed to the presence of distinguished Islamic scholars (Ulama) in the region, who were metaphorically referred to as "jewels" (Johari). Another tradition links the name to the area's production of pure gold jewelry, reflecting its historical craftsmanship and trade in fine jewelry. Additionally, an account highlights the influence of a prominent Muslim landowner named Jhawari from the Bhatti tribe, who played a significant role in the community during the time of Dullah Bhatti, a local hero who opposed the Mughal Emperor Akbar. The confluence of these rich historical and cultural elements shaped the identity of Jhawarian.

During the Second Anglo-Sikh War, a British force supported by Tiwanas warriors defeated the Sikh Army during the Battle of Chachran, near Jhawarian. The British-allied victory was supported by Malik Sahib Khan Tiwana, who assisted a British major in defeating the Sikh army near Jhawarian. The battle occurred not many years after Sikh Empire leader, Ranjit Singh, had captured neighboring villages around Jhawarian. Later, a Police Station in the town was established by the British administration of Punjab in the early 20th century.

Prior to Partition, Jhawarian had been a vibrant home for diverse communities, including Hindu and Sikh families, for generations.

In 1931, the population of Jhawarian was 5,905. 4,231 were Muslim, 728 were Hindu, and 154 were Sikh. In post-partition 1951, the population of Jhawarian was 6,241, all who were Muslim.

== Location ==
Jhawarian is located on the Sher Shah Suri Highway, between Shahpur and Behra, and three kilometers from Kalra Estate.

== Kalra estate ==
Malik Sahib Khan established an estate at Kalra. He had received this from the British in reward for his meritorious services during the Great Revolt of 1857. Malik Umar Hayat Tiwana, had succeeded to the estate as a minor just over twenty years later. He was elected member of the Council of State of India and His son Malik Khizar Hayat Tiwana, served as the Premier of the Punjab Province of British India between 1942 and 1947. Umar Hayat Tiwana also designed an estate flag. It was a red, green and saffron tricolour on which were set a crescent and star. In 1912 Lord Hardinge visited the Stud farm at Kalra. Umar Hayat Tiwana built mosques and temples on his own estate, ensuring freedom of religious practice and worship for all people according to their faith. Non-Muslims held key positions within the Kalra estate, as exemplified by the Hindu head accountant and deputy manager. Numerous shops owned by Hindus. In the outlying villages, Sikhs invariably served as Kardars. By the 1930s, the Kalra estate's population had reached approximately five thousand, with Awans, Sials, and Gondals constituting the majority.

Kalra estate was administrated by the Court of Wards from March 1879 to 1895. During this period James Wilson and Malcolm Hailey served as administrators.

== Culture ==
This town is home to a mainly Punjabi population and Islam is the main religion. There are many mosques and shrines in this town. Jamia Masjid Kalan is the largest mosque of the town. It has enough space for about 2500 people to pray at the same time.

== Language ==
Punjabi is the language of most of the population, but a fair number of people speak Urdu as well.

== Economy & agriculture ==
Jhawarian has a thriving commercial center where markets and shops sells necessities for everyday living. Additionally, it has a number of schools and colleges, as well as a hospital and a police station.

Jhawarian is a major agricultural town. The town is a major producer of wheat, rice, sugarcane and cotton.

== Financial and public services ==
This town has branches of five major banks, including NBP, UBL, HBL, MCB, and Meezan Bank. Additionally, a Nadra and a Pakistan Post office are located within the town, providing convenient access to essential government services.

== Villages near Jhawarian ==
- Birbal Sharif
- Chak Musa
- Ghangwal
- Hayat Pur
- Kalra
- Khurshaid
- Kot Abbas
- Kot Bhai Khan
- Kot Pehlwan
- Kotli Awan
- Kot Kamboh
- Kudh Lathi
- Mankey Wala
- Megha Kadhi
- Sedal
