= Khizar Hayat Tiwana =

Former Premier of British Punjab (1900-1975)

Sir Nawab Malik Khizar Hayat Tiwana
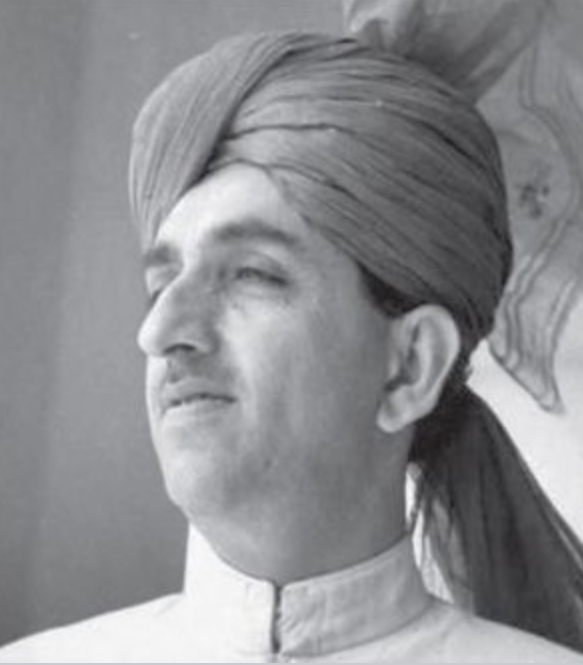

2nd Premier of the Punjab
- In office 30 December 1942 – 2 March 1947
- Governor: Bertrand Glancy; Evan Meredith Jenkins
- Preceded by: Sikandar Hayat Khan
- Succeeded by: Governor rule

Personal details
- Born: 7 August 1900 Chak Muzaffarabad, Punjab Province (British India)
- Died: 20 January 1975 (aged 74) Butte City, California, U.S.
- Relatives: Malik Munir Khan Tiwana (cousin)

Military service
- Branch/service: British Indian Army
- Years of service: 1916–1923
- Rank: Captain
- Unit: 17th Cavalry
- Battles/wars: World War I Third Anglo-Afghan War

Malik Khizar Hayat Tiwana (7 August 1900 – 20 January 1975) (Note: Punjabi: ملک خضرحیات ٹوانہ; Gurmukhī: ਸਰ ਖ਼ਿਜ਼ਰ ਹਯਾਤ ਟਿਵਾਣਾ) was a British Indian statesman, landowner, army officer, and politician belonging to the Punjab Unionist Party. He served as the prime minister of the Punjab Province (British India) between 1942 and 1947. He opposed the Partition of India and the ideology of Muslim League. He was eventually ousted from office by the Muslim League through a civil disobedience campaign, plunging Punjab into communal violence that led to the partition of the province between India and Pakistan.

== Early life ==
Khizar Hayat Tiwana was born at Chak Muzaffarabad, in the Shahpur District of the Punjab Province during British Raj in 1900. He was born into the feudal Tiwana family of Shahpur. He was owner of 1,800 Murabba (45,000 acres) of agriculture land. His father Sir Umar Hayat Khan was also a wealthy landowner and soldier who was an elected member of the Council of the Secretary of State for India. Sir Umar Hayat was a close friend to King George V. He was educated at Aitchison College in Lahore. Unlike his father, Sir Khizar was a religious person and is believed to be a follower of Sufism. He started managing his Kalra Estate at young age. His father Sir Umar Hayat was fond of cars, greyhounds and extravagant lifestyle. He was the first person to own cars in Shahpur district in 1920s. However, Sir Khizar was a much more calculated person; though he loved horses a lot. He owned the largest stud-farm at that time in Punjab with around 300 horses and mares. He was a renowned horse breeder. He had a huge horse breeding facility at his farmland at Khizarabad, near Bhalwal. Sir Khizar enjoyed playing polo. He had a private polo ground at his Kalra Palace. It was once visited by Lord Hardinge, the viceroy of British India. Lord Malcolm Hailey, the Governor of Punjab was among his close friend and a regular visitor at Kalra Estate. Sir Khizar had numerous palaces and properties in Sargodha, Lahore, Delhi and Simla.

== Military career ==
At the age of 16, Tiwana volunteered for war service, and on 17 April 1918 he was commissioned into the 17th Cavalry as a temporary honorary second lieutenant in the Indian Land Forces. In addition to his few months of First World War service, Khizar also briefly served in the Third Anglo-Afghan War which followed, earning a mention in dispatches. He was advanced to honorary second lieutenant on 21 November 1919 and was promoted to the honorary rank of captain on 17 April 1923. He thereafter assisted his father in the management of the family estates in the Punjab, taking responsibility for them while his father was in London. He was promoted to honorary major on 17 April 1936 and to honorary lieutenant-colonel on 12 January 1943.

== Entry into politics ==
Tiwana was elected to the Punjab Legislative Assembly in 1937. He immediately joined the cabinet of Sir Sikandar Hayat Khan as Minister of Public Works and Local Self Government. Tiwana lacked public speaking skills and administrative experience and obtained the position largely through his father's reputation and the standing of his family. Despite this, he became a trusted member of the cabinet and was entrusted with the home portfolio responsible for dealing with the police and law and order. At the outbreak of the Second World War he had been placed in charge of the Manpower Committee of the Punjab War Board and the Civil Defence Departments. In 1940 he was responsible for handling the Unionist Party's dealings with the Allama Mashriqi and for arranging security at the All-India Muslim League sessions in Lahore.

In his native constituency, he engaged in political rivalry with Nawab Muhammad Hayat Qureshi, a prominent supporter of Jinnah and the incumbent President of the All India Muslim League for Shahpur District. Sir Allah Buksh Tiwana was a relative and close political advisor to Sir Khizar Hayat.

His achievements included overseeing reform of the panchayat system by extending their administrative, fiscal and judicial functions, and ensuring improvements to infrastructure and irrigation networks. He steadfastly supported pro-unionist agrarian policies, and sympathized with their efforts to promote communal harmony.

== Premier of the Punjab ==
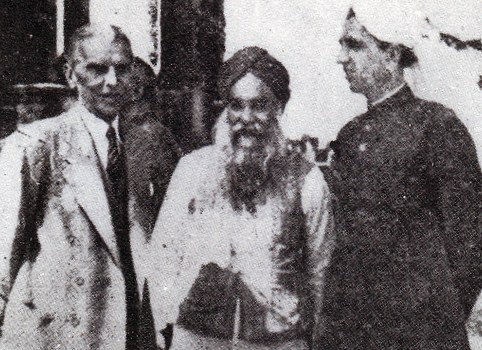
Malik Khizar Hayat Tiwana (right), Premier of the Punjab, with Sikh leader Master Tara Singh (centre), and Mohammad Ali Jinnah, leader of the All India Muslim League at the Simla Conference called by viceroy Lord Wavell in June 1945.

=== 1942–1946 ===
In 1942 Sir Sikandar Hayat Khan unexpectedly died creating a vacancy as Premier. The position was eyed by the three dominant Muslim factions, the Noon-Tiwana, Daultanas and the Hayats. Tiwana was unanimously selected as his successor on 23 January 1943.

Tiwana assumed control during the height of the Second World War. Many Punjabi soldiers had been killed, others returned maimed, and demobilised soldiers were not being immediately allotted parcels of land in the canal colonies. To feed Bengalis suffering the Bengal famine of 1943, the central government in Delhi instructed Tiwana's government to introduce rationing in the Punjab and fix grain prices which in turn affected landowner's financially. A war weariness descended over the Punjab, and food shortages, fixed prices, and their support for conscription, damaged attitudes towards Tiwana's government from rich and poor Muslim alike.

Like Sikandar, Tiwana was staunchly opposed to the idea of Pakistan created by the Muslim League, yet unlike his predecessor was less willing to compromise or bow to the dictation of its leader Muhammad Ali Jinnah. Jinnah increasingly sought to enforce the Sikandar-Jinnah pact and wield influence over the government claiming that as the Muslims of the Unionist party also belonged to the Muslim League, the Punjab government was a League government and should submit to directives of the Muslim League leadership. In April 1944 Jinnah demanded that the name of the Unionist Party be changed to the Muslim League Coalition Party. Tiwana rebuffed these demands asserting that his government was a coalition between Muslims, Hindus and Sikhs, rather than a Muslim League government Tension with Jinnah simmered until Tiwana was expelled from the Muslim League later that year. This opened a rift within the Unionist Party, with Muslim members now forced to choose between Tiwana and the Muslim League. Following this clash, the Muslim League waged an increasing vitriolic campaign against him, denouncing him as a 'quisling' and 'kafir'. Mock funerals were held outside his official residence and he was greeted wherever he went with black flags of protest.

Tiwana suffered a further blow in January 1945 with the death of Sir Chhottu Ram, the Unionist leader of the Hindu Jats in south eastern Punjab. Ram was a pillar of the Unionist Party and greatly respected by Muslims in the province. Jinnah increased the pressure on Tiwana at the Simla Conference of 1945. Convened by the Viceroy of India Lord Wavell, the conference was to put together an interim government in India following the war. Jinnah insisted that any Muslim nominee to the government must be selected by the Muslim League, as only they spoke for the entirety of Muslims in India. This was seen as an attempt to undermine the influence of the Unionist Party, and its ability to represent its Muslim constituency. In September 1945, Sir Feroz Khan Noon, a member of the Noon-Tiwana faction, resigned from the Unionist party and urged Tiwana and other Unionists to join the Muslim League. Noon had previously been a key ally for Tiwana, assuring him that he would help heal his rift with Jinnah and urging him to not divide the Punjabi Muslims - the heart of Muslim India. Noon's defection opened the gates for further defections from the party. Other defectors included Sikandar's son, Shaukat Hayat Khan and Mumtaz Daultana, who both realigned their families support towards the Muslim League.

=== 1946–1947 ===
At the Indian provincial elections of 1946, the Muslim League won seventy nine seats to the Punjab Assembly, and reduced the Unionists to just ten. Despite this crushing defeat for Tiwana and the Unionists, the Muslim League were unable to form a government as they lacked an absolute majority. Tiwana struck a deal with the Congress Party and Akali Dal and was invited to form a coalition government. His cabinet included Sir Muzaffar Ali Khan Qizilbash, Bhim Sen Sachar and Baldev Singh. The coalition proved a disaster, as for the first time a predominately non-Muslim government held power. From the outset the Muslim League organised a programme of civil disobedience and disruption to the province. The Muslim League argued it was an example of Hindu connivance to defeat the interests of the Muslim community. Tiwana was portrayed as a traitor, clinging to power and office without regard for the interests of the Muslims.

Tiwana remained opposed to the partition of India to the end. He felt that Muslims, Sikhs and Hindus of the Punjab all had a common culture and was against dividing India to create a religious segregation between the same people. Tiwana, himself a Muslim, remarked to the separatist leader Muhammad Ali Jinnah: "There are Hindu and Sikh Tiwanas who are my relatives. I go to their weddings and other ceremonies. How can I possibly regard them as coming from another nation?" He refused to accept the two-nation theory, and believed that a Muslim majority government in the Punjab would be an important guarantee of the rights of Muslims in a minority province. Tiwana advocated for amity between the religious communities of undivided India, proclaiming March 1 as Communal Harmony Day and aiding in the establishment of a Communal Harmony Committee in Lahore presided over by Raja Narendra Nath with its secretary being Maulvi Mahomed Ilyas of Bahawalpur. As a last ditch attempt to avoid partition, Tiwana attempted to convince the British to accept his proposal for an independent Punjabi state, a separate entity to both India and Pakistan.

He was made a Knight Commander of the Order of the Star of India in the 1946 New Year Honours and was a member of the Indian delegation to the Paris Peace Conference in the summer of 1946. Due to the boycotts engulfing the Punjab, he resigned as Premier on 2 March 1947. Sir Evan Jenkins, as Governor of the Punjab assumed direct control of the Punjab until the day of partition, 14 August 1947.

== Later life ==
He retired from politics following his resignation, and lived for a time in Simla and Delhi following independence. He returned to the Kalra Estate, Jhawarian in the newly created Pakistan in October 1949.

In 1951, Mumtaz Daultana targeted those who were against the Pakistan movement by proposing a law confiscating without redress, all land grants issued during the premiership of Tiwana. In Tiwana's hometown of Shahpur, this would amount to 10,000 acres. Alarmed by these measures, Tiwana appealed to the British government without success. In 1954, Daultana would confiscate all the private canals owned by Tiwana under the guise of the Punjab Minor Canals Bill.

During his stay in United States Tiwana, reflecting on the creation of Bangladesh, echoed his opposition to the partition of India, particularly the division of the Punjab Province, stating: "I still think a Punjabi Muslim has more in common with a Punjabi Hindu or Sikh than with a Bengali (or any non-Punjabi really) and I think the separation of East Pakistan proved that."

He died in Butte City, California, on 20 January 1975. Indira Gandhi, Zulfikar Ali Bhutto and Louis Mountbatten shared condolences. His coffin was draped not in the Kalra tricolour.

== Bibliography ==
- Jalal, Ayesha (1994) [1985], The Sole Spokesman: Jinnah, the Muslim League and the Demand for Pakistan, Cambridge University Press, ISBN 978-0-521-45850-4
- Hardy, Peter (1972). The Muslims of British India. Cambridge University Press. ISBN 978-0-521-08488-8.
- Korson, J. Henry (1974). Contemporary Problems of Pakistan. BRILL. ISBN 978-90-04-47468-0.
- Moon, Penderel (1962). Divide and Quit. University of California Press – via archive.org.
- Shah, Mehtab Ali (1997), The Foreign Policy of Pakistan: Ethnic Impacts on Diplomacy 1971-1994, I.B.Tauris, ISBN 978-1-86064-169-5
- Talbot, Ian (2013). Khizr Tiwana, the Punjab Unionist Party and the Partition of India. Routledge. ISBN 978-1-136-79036-2.
