= Awagat =

Sarjun Pur (old name)
- Awagat
- Location within Pakistan
- Coordinates: 31.9°N 73.17°E
- Country: Pakistan
- Elevation: 175 m (574 ft)
- Time zone: UTC+5 (PST)
- Calling code: 0414

Awagat (Surjeon Pur) is a town of Jaranwala Tehsil in the Faisalabad District, Punjab, Pakistan, 12 km from Jaranwala and 25 km from Faisalabad. Its history goes back to the construction of the extensive canal irrigation system in Punjab around the 1860s. A rest house was constructed at Awagat to look after construction and maintenance of the Awagat Distributary, a branch emerging from the Upper Gogera Canal (a branch of Lower Chenab Canal) at Punj Pulla near Buchiana. It is located at 31°9'0N 73°16'0E with an altitude of 175 metres (577 feet). Awagat Adda is situated at the junction of four villages – Chak 66GB, 65GB, 64GB and 63GB – located in two union councils of Tehsil Jaranwala. It is situated in two Provincial Assembly and National Assembly constituencies that are NA 76 and NA 77.

== Town ==
About four roads connect more than 15 villages to Adda Awagat. The oldest one was constructed in 1965 from Awagat to Chak, 68 GB via 66GB and 67 GB. People from different villages come here for business and shopping purposes.

More than eight mosques are located in different areas of Awagat. The oldest one is opposite the post office building, which is located on the main road. Two banks, the National Bank of Pakistan and MCB Ltd, are also located at Adda Awagat.

== Education ==
Govt Higher Secondary school Awagat is one of the oldest and largest schools of Faisalabad district, as it is a modern and well-equipped school. Private school systems include Quiad-e-Azam science school, Professional Grammar school, Zia ul Quran education system, and others.

A veterinary hospital is established under the Punjab Government. An agriculture officer is also posted at Awagat by the Punjab Government to look after matters related to their field. A Rural Health Center 65GB with a capacity of 12 beds is situated near Adda Awagat.

In 1989, after Dr Zameer closed his clinic at Awagat, Waqas Medi Care was established by Dr Muhammad Afzal Pervaiz. There are two major private hospitals.

In addition to agriculture, there are now industrial units established in the vicinity of Adad Awagat.

Famous places include the canal rest house (Bangla Awagat), and the playground of the Higher Secondary School.
