= Shahpur District =

Former administrative area in Pakistan

Shahpur District شاہ پور ضلع
- District Administration
- Location within Punjab, Pakistan Location within Pakistan
- Coordinates: 32°17′55″N 72°35′5″E
- Country: British India
- Province: Punjab
- Division: Rawalpindi Division
- Elevation: 210 m (690 ft)

Population
  - Total: 15,000
- Time zone: UTC+5 (PST)
- Calling code: 048

Shahpur District, established in 1893 during the British Raj, existed in what is now Pakistan until 1960. From its inception until 1914, Shahpur served as the district headquarters. In 1914, the headquarters were relocated to Sargodha, although the district retained the name Shahpur. In 1960, the Sargodha District was formed, and Shahpur District was restructured as Shahpur Tehsil.

== Notable and historical personalities ==
1. Hazrat Shah Shams Shirazi - Qazi in the court of Mughal Emperor Akbar
2. Hazrat Shah Yousaf - Sufi Peer.
3. Nawab Sir Malik Umar Hayat Khan Tiwana- A General from British India
4. Nawab Sir Khizar Hayat Tiwana- Former Prime Minister of the United Punjab
5. Nawab Muhammad Hayat Qureshi - Former Cabinet Member of the Viceroy, Governor-General of India
6. Nawabzada Zakir Qureshi - Former Federal Minister of Pakistan
7. Nawab Mubaraz Khan Tiwana of Jahanabad - Philanthropist, Former Cabinet Member of the Governor-General of India
8. Mian Habib Sultan Nangiana - Sufi Saint
9. Sir Feroz Khan Noon - Former Prime Minister of Pakistan

== History ==
Shahpur district was annexed by the British from its former Sikh rulers after the Second Anglo-Sikh War of 1848–1849. Shahpur, historically significant in the Punjab region, was a district during British colonial rule. Established in the early 19th century, it encompassed parts of present-day Sargodha, Khushab, and Bhakkar districts in Pakistan. The district played a role in the 1857 uprising against British rule, witnessing notable events. Post-independence in 1947, Shahpur underwent administrative changes, leading to the creation of separate districts. Today, the region continues to carry historical and cultural significance within the broader context of Punjab's heritage.

The Shahpur district was one of the six districts of the Rawalpindi Division. It was divided into two equal parts by the river Jhelum, the western half constituting the Khushab tehsil, while the cis-Jhelum portion was subdivided into two tehsils also nearly equal in area, the Bhera tehsil to the east, and the Shahpur tehsil in the middle.

== Demographics ==
Four census were conducted between 1855 and 1891 by the British. The proportion percent of total populations returned as belonging to the chief religions at successive censuses is as follows.

Percentage of total populations

Census of	Hindu	Sikh	Muslim	Other	
1855	17.2		82.8		100
1868	14.5	0.9	82.8	1.8	100
1881	14.0	1.1	84.9		100
1891	13.4	2.0	84.6		100

Religious groups in Shahpur District (British Punjab province era)
Religious group	1881		1891		1901		1911		1921		1931		1941	
Religious group	Pop.	%	Pop.	%	Pop.	%	Pop.	%	Pop.	%	Pop.	%	Pop.	%
Islam	357,742	84.87%	417,661	84.62%	442,921	84.49%	572,565	83.3%	596,100	82.8%	679,546	82.72%	835,918	83.68%
Hinduism (Note: 1931-1941: Including Ad-Dharmis)	59,026	14%	66,065	13.38%	68,489	13.06%	72,695	10.58%	82,182	11.42%	90,561	11.02%	102,172	10.23%
Sikhism	4,702	1.12%	9,777	1.98%	12,756	2.43%	33,456	4.87%	30,361	4.22%	40,074	4.88%	48,046	4.81%
Christianity	29	0.01%	80	0.02%	91	0.02%	8,616	1.25%	11,270	1.57%	11,294	1.37%	12,770	1.28%
Jainism	9	0%	0	0%	2	0%	5	0%	3	0%	14	0%	13	0%
Buddhism	0	0%	0	0%	0	0%	28	0%	2	0%	1	0%	2	0%
Zoroastrianism	0	0%	5	0%	0	0%	1	0%	0	0%	0	0%	0	0%
Judaism	—N/a	—N/a	0	0%	0	0%	0	0%	0	0%	0	0%	0	0%
Others	0	0%	0	0%	0	0%	0	0%	0	0%	0	0%	0	0%
Total population	421,508	100%	493,588	100%	524,259	100%	687,366	100%	719,918	100%	821,490	100%	998,921	100%
Note1: British Punjab province era district borders are not an exact match in the present-day due to various bifurcations to district borders — which since created new districts — throughout the historic Punjab Province region during the post-independence era that have taken into account population increases. Note2: Presently known as Sargodha District, following district headquarters relocated to Sargodha in 1960.

Religion in the Tehsils of Shahpur District (1921)
Tehsil	Islam		Hinduism		Sikhism		Christianity		Jainism		Others (Note: Including Buddhism, Zoroastrianism, Judaism, Tribals, others, or not stated)		Total	
Tehsil	Pop.	%	Pop.	%	Pop.	%	Pop.	%	Pop.	%	Pop.	%	Pop.	%
Shahpur Tehsil	117,894	85.49%	14,610	10.59%	5,014	3.64%	381	0.28%	0	0%	0	0%	137,899	100%
Khushab Tehsil	149,087	88.36%	14,307	8.48%	5,301	3.14%	23	0.01%	0	0%	0	0%	168,718	100%
Bhalwal Tehsil	190,194	86.08%	25,620	11.6%	4,152	1.88%	984	0.45%	0	0%	1	0%	220,951	100%
Sargodha Tehsil	138,925	72.23%	27,645	14.37%	15,894	8.26%	9,882	5.14%	3	0%	1	0%	192,350	100%
Note: British Punjab province era tehsil borders are not an exact match in the present-day due to various bifurcations to tehsil borders — which since created new tehsils — throughout the historic Punjab Province region during the post-independence era that have taken into account population increases.

Religion in the Tehsils of Shahpur District (1941)
Tehsil	Islam		Hinduism		Sikhism		Christianity		Jainism		Others (Note: Including Anglo-Indian Christians, British Christians, Buddhism, Zoroastrianism, Judaism, Tribals, others, or not stated)		Total	
Tehsil	Pop.	%	Pop.	%	Pop.	%	Pop.	%	Pop.	%	Pop.	%	Pop.	%
Shahpur Tehsil	161,337	87.91%	15,968	8.7%	6,037	3.29%	179	0.1%	5	0%	3	0%	183,529	100%
Khushab Tehsil	211,565	90.08%	17,474	7.44%	5,809	2.47%	8	0%	0	0%	3	0%	234,859	100%
Bhalwal Tehsil	263,691	87.22%	31,683	10.48%	6,484	2.14%	482	0.16%	1	0%	4	0%	302,345	100%
Sargodha Tehsil	199,325	71.65%	37,047	13.32%	29,716	10.68%	12,021	4.32%	7	0%	72	0.03%	278,188	100%
Note1: British Punjab province era tehsil borders are not an exact match in the present-day due to various bifurcations to tehsil borders — which since created new tehsils — throughout the historic Punjab Province region during the post-independence era that have taken into account population increases. Note2: Tehsil religious breakdown figures for Christianity only includes local Christians, labeled as "Indian Christians" on census. Does not include Anglo-Indian Christians or British Christians, who were classified under "Other" category.
