= Malik Fateh Khan Tiwana =

Punjabi landowner and politician

Malik Fateh Khan Tiwana (Note: Punjabi: ملک فتح خان ٹوانہ) (died 1848) was a Punjabi landowner, Sardar of Mitha Tiwana State and politician during the Sikh Empire.

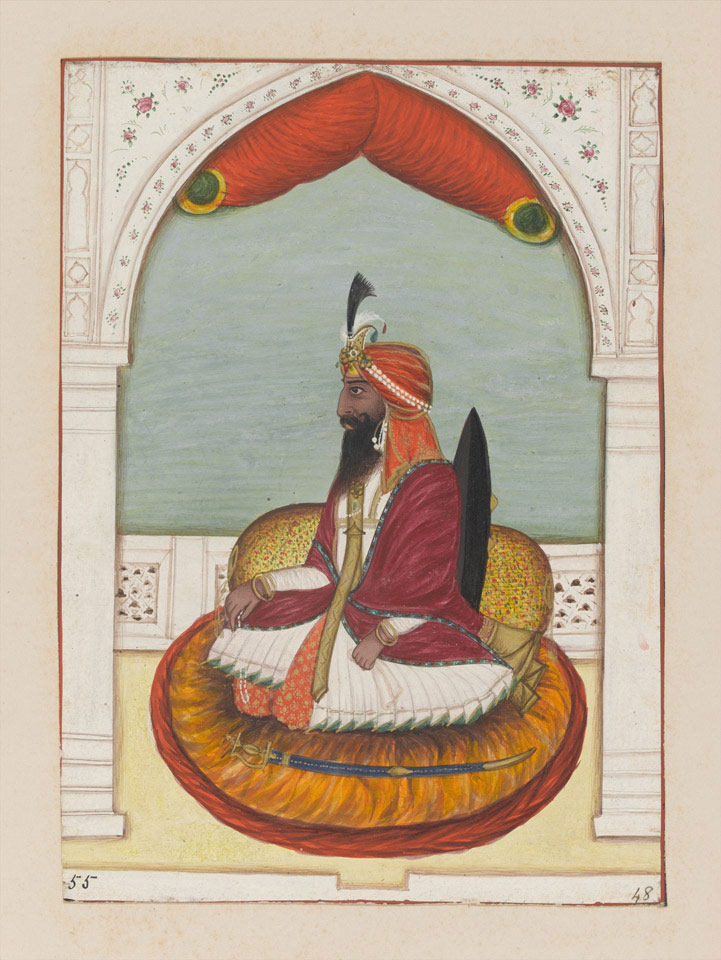
Fateh Khan Tiwana, watercolour company painting, Punjab, c. 1865

== Biography ==
=== Early life ===
Born to Khuda Yar Khan Tiwana, he was a member of the Tiwana family of Shahpur. He was the grandson of Khan Muhammad Khan Tiwana, the chief of Nurpur Tirwana, and the uncle of Malik Sahib Khan Tiwana. He served General Hari Singh Nalwa who had held the jagir of Mitha Tiwana since 1819. Fateh Khan held a command under Hari Singh's authority until his death in 1837. The following year Prime Minister, Raja Dhyan Singh rewarded him control of Mitha Tiwana and the salt mines to the south of the country. His administration was unsuccessful and he was placed under house arrest by Nau Nihal Singh until arrears were paid. On the death of Nau Nihal Singh, his fortunes rose once again, and he was made manager of the Kachhi country. In 1843 his patron Raja Dhyan Singh was assassinated, and Fateh was accused of conspiracy to the murder. The murdered minister's son, Hira Singh, himself now Prime Minister, placed a bounty on Fateh's head. Fateh escaped to Bannu where he sought refuge and thereafter returned to rally fellow Muslims to take up arms against the government.

=== Murder of Pashaura Singh ===
In 1844, on the fall of Hira Singh from power, Fateh went to Lahore to seek the assistance of Jowahir Singh, the new Prime Minister. Jowahir Singh made him governor of Mitha Tiwana, of portions of Jhelum and Rawalpindi, and of the whole province of Dera Ismail Khan and Bannu. In return, Fateh was requested to assist Jowahir Singh in defeating Pashaura Singh, a reputed son of Ranjit Singh and popular choice to succeed as Maharajah of the Punjab. Pashaura had, with the help of local Muslim tribes, secured the fort of Attock. Together with Chattar Singh Attariwalla, and some 8,000 men, Fateh was ordered to the fort. Unable to seize Pashaura by force, they promised him safe passage if he surrendered the fort, and Pashaura obliged. They then set out for Lahore, when upon reaching Hasan Abdal, they received word that it was unsafe to continue to the capital and were ordered to retain him in the north of the province. That same night they placed him in chains and marched him back to Attock. Here he was placed in the lower chamber of a tower, and strangled to death the following night. His body was thrown into the Indus River.

After the murder of Pashaura, Fateh took possession of Dera Ismail Khan and sought to secure his position. He had two of the chief Jagirdars of Tank killed, namely Payinda Khan and Ashik Muhammad Khan, whilst a third Haiyat Ullah Khan narrowly escaped. The killings caused uproar across the province and Fateh had to pay a high price for immunity. He was however replaced as governor of Dera Ismail Khan by Daulat Rai. In 1846 he was attacked by Daulat Rai and forced to retire to Mitha Tiwana. In the summer of 1846 he was sent to Kashmir in a bid to influence his friend, the rebel governor Imaduddin, and to convince him to surrender the province of Kashmir to Gulab Singh. Having achieved his mission with success, he later accompanied Major Henry Lawrence to Kashmir.

=== Later life and death ===
On his return to Lahore he was held to account for financial irregularities in his former government. He was ordered to pay four lakh rupees, and on pleading impecunity, he was held under house arrest by Lawrence. He was then imprisoned at Govindghar fort along with his son Fatah Sher Khan.

At the start of the Second Anglo-Sikh War, Lieutenant Edwardes recommended he be installed as the Governor of Bannu in place of Lieutenant Taylor. He was besieged at his fort of Dalipnagar, and killed in the gateway. He was succeeded by son Fatah Sher Khan, who would go on to serve as one of Lieutenant Edwardes's chief officers, and rendered support for the British during the Indian Rebellion of 1857. Malik Muhammad Sher Khan Tiwana was his grandson, who further had two sons, Shahadat Khan Tiwana and Feroz Khan Tiwana.
