= Chak 118 GB =

Village in Pakistan

Jallandhar Sufaid Poshan
- Village
- Chak 118 GB
- Location in Pakistan
- Coordinates: 31°15′30.76″N 73°12′54.39″E
- Country: Pakistan
- District: Faisalabad District
- Tehsil: Jaranwala
- Union Council: Number 60, 115 GB

Area
  - Total: 4 km^{2} (1.5 sq mi)

Population (2010)
  - Total: 3,714
- Time zone: UTC+5 (PST)
  - Summer (DST): UTC+6 (PDT)
- Post Code: 37201
- Area code: 041

Chak 118 GB is a medium-sized village in Tehsil Jaranwala, Faisalabad District in Pakistan's Punjab province. Chak 118 GB is part of union council 60, along with other chaks (villages) 56 GB, Chak 114 GB and 170 GB, Chak 115 GB and 116 GB.

== Location ==
It is located some 28 km south-east of Faisalabad city and 5 km east of Road Faisalabad - Okara. Satyana Bungalow is the nearest town (10 km).

== Demography ==
Arain ( GUJJAR ) Awan and Rajputs are the major castes of this village.

== Education ==
The village has schools for boys and girls providing education up to 10th standard. Nearest higher secondary school (up to 12th grade) is located at Chak 72 GB. For college education of boys and girls, students have to seek admission in colleges at Faisalabad or Jaranwala. Existing schools at the village are:

- Government Girls Primary school
- Government Boys Primary School
- Government Boys High School
- Government Girls High School
