= Chak 236 GB Kilanwala =

Kilanwala چک نمبر 236 گ ب کلیانوالہ
- Union Council
- 236 GB Kilanwala
- Location within Punjab, Pakistan Location within Pakistan
- Coordinates: 31°22′57.4″N 73°28′48.4″E
- Country: Pakistan
- Province: Punjab
- District: Faisalabad District
- Administrative divisions: Jaranwala Tehsil

Government
- Elevation: 184 m (604 ft)

Population (2017 Census)
  - Total: 4,3602,017
- Time zone: UTC+5 (PST)
- Calling code: 041

Chak 236 GB Kilanwala (Urdu چک 236 گ ب کلیانوالہ) is a village and union council in Jaranwala Tehsil of Faisalabad District, in Punjab, Pakistan.

It is located 8 kilometres (5.0 mi) from Jaranwala on Jaranwala-Nankana Road. Before the Partition of India, the population included Sikhs and Hindus; after the Partition, Muslims migrated from the villages of Anihar, Nangal Fateh Khan, and other villages in Jalandhar, India. The "GB" suffix refers to the Gugera Branch Canal that irrigates the nearby agricultural land.

== Population and area ==
According to the 2017 census, the total population of the village is 4360.

The total area of the village is 6 square kilometres (2.3 sq mi). The total agricultural land area is 647.488 hectares.

== See also ==
- Government Islamia High School Jaranwala
