= Chak 233 GB Kot Barseer =

Chak 233 GB
- Union Council
- 233 GB Kot Barseer
- Location within Punjab, Pakistan Location within Pakistan
- Coordinates: 31°25′47.1″N 73°30′34.6″E
- Country: Pakistan
- Province: Punjab
- District: Faisalabad District
- Administrative divisions: Jaranwala Tehsil
- Elevation: 184 m (604 ft)

Population (2017 Census)
  - Total: 4,400
- Time zone: UTC+5 (PST)
- Calling code: 041

Chak 233 GB Kot Barseer is a village located next to Chak 234 GB in Jaranwala Tehsil of Faisalabad District, Pakistan. There is one primary school for girls and a middle school for boys in the village. Near by rail station Panj Pulla on Shorkot–Sheikhupura Branch Line.

postcode
