= Rebellion of Fateh Khan Tiwana =

1844 rebellion in the Punjab

Date	January–November 1843
Location	Trans-Indus frontier (Tank and Bannu area), Dera Ismail Khan region, Mitha Tiwana
Result	Sikh victory (Note: "A number of rebellions took place during the ministry of Hira Singh, but all of them failed."): rebellion suppressed (Note: "This caused much anxiety to the Darbar, though the small-scale rebellion was soon put down.") (Note: "crushed the rebellion of Fateh Khan Tiwana in Dera Ismail Khan in November 1843")

Belligerents
Sikh Empire	Forces of Fateh Khan Tiwana; Waziri tribesmen

Commanders and leaders
Wazir Hira Singh; Diwan Lakhi Mal; Diwan Sawan Mal; Mangal Singh Siranwali; Diwan Mulraj; Bakhshi Hari Singh	Malik Fateh Khan Tiwana; Qadir Bakhsh (POW); Allahdad Khan of Tank

Strength
Unknown	Unknown

Casualties and losses
~450 killed and wounded	~450 killed and wounded

The rebellion of Fateh Khan Tiwana was a frontier uprising in 1843 against the Lahore Darbar, led by Malik Fateh Khan Tiwana, a Tiwana jagirdar associated with the Trans-Indus districts. It began shortly after Hira Singh assumed power at Lahore, when Fateh Khan fled the court, took refuge across the Indus, and attempted to rally support in the Tank and Bannu frontier. After a period of raids and clashes including a major engagement at Mitha Tiwana in November 1843 the rebellion was suppressed, and Fateh Khan withdrew again across the Indus.

== Background ==
Malik Fateh Khan Tiwana held a service jagir traditionally valued at about ten thousand rupees annually, and is described as having had close ties with leading figures at Lahore before the assassination crisis of 1843. Accounts differ on the extent to which he was suspected of complicity in the murder of Dhian Singh, one narrative notes that some contemporaries believed he had been privy to the assassination and had deliberately held back at a critical moment. In the aftermath, Hira Singh is described as suspecting him, and Fateh Khan chose to leave Lahore.

Frontier conditions also encouraged unrest. Sita Ram Khohli links the outbreak of disturbances in multiple frontier districts to the influence of Gulab Singh, describing him as maintaining communications with rebel chiefs and offering monetary assistance to Fateh Khan after the latter openly defied the Sikh Empire. Another narrative stresses Lahore Darbar anxiety that the Tiwana rising might provoke wider Muslim revolt on either bank of the Indus.

== Course ==
=== Tank revolt and Diwan Lakhi Mal's suppression ===
Soon after Hira Singh's assumption of power, Fateh Khan escaped from Lahore, crossed the Indus, and seized the fort of Tank in the Bannu district, where neighbouring zamindars reportedly joined him in defiance of the Lahore Darbar. The Lahore Darbar ordered Diwan Lakhi Mal to march against him, but the advance was impeded when lands around the fort were flooded. By mid-January, Fateh Khan was forced to abandon Tank, which was then garrisoned by Sikh troops.

He then moved through territory administered by Diwan Sawan Mal, who pursued him and captured members of Fateh Khan's family, including his brother Qadir Bakhsh by early February, one of Fateh Khan's sons was also captured. For the next several months Fateh Khan remained in hiding in the Trans-Indus region.

=== Battle of Mitha Tiwana ===
In early June, Fateh Khan re-emerged and became active again. The Lahore Darbar despatched Mangal Singh Siranwali against him and pressed Diwan Sawan Mal to reduce him quickly. Qadir Bakhsh sent by Sawan Mal to Lahore was released on a promise that he would urge Fateh Khan to submit.

Instead, Fateh Khan attacked a party of Sikh troops and defeated it, then seized and plundered Mitha Tiwana. Gupta further reports that, to impede pursuing forces, Fateh Khan slaughtered cattle and polluted local drinking water. Around mid-June, Diwan Mulraj of Multan and Bakhshi Hari Singh engaged Fateh Khan at Mitha. In that action, Sikh forces led by Qadir Bakhsh defeated Fateh Khan, who fled, his house was set on fire and seventy people were burned inside, while his mother, one wife, and his eldest son were captured. Mangal Singh was slightly wounded, and total losses are reported as about 450 killed and wounded on both sides. Mulraj pursued Fateh Khan as far as Jandwala, after which Fateh Khan disappeared across the Indus for roughly two months.

=== Renewed depredations and failed negotiations ===
In early September, Fateh Khan resurfaced and resumed depredations near Tank, joined by sons and relatives of the late Allahdad Khan of Tank and by Waziri tribesmen. Sikh troops again pursued him, after about a week of pressure he requested pardon, but this was refused. Fateh Khan then withdrew into Waziri territory.

In early October, as conflict between Gulab Singh and the Lahore Darbar intensified, Gulab Singh attempted to enlist Fateh Khan's support, sending him money and asking him to come to Jammu. Toward the end of October, Fateh Khan sued for peace through Sodhi Nihal Singh. The Lahore Darbar demanded surrender of plundered property, reimbursement of campaign expenses, and payment of a fine for treason, Fateh Khan considered the terms too harsh and again crossed the Indus to wait for a better opportunity.

== Aftermath ==
The rising was contained without developing into a sustained frontier-wide revolt. Chopra characterises it as a small-scale rebellion that was soon put down, though it caused anxiety at Lahore because it coincided with other disturbances and revenue tensions in the provinces. Kohli presents Fateh Khan's continued defiance as being strengthened by moral and material support from Gulab Singh during renewed strains with Hira Singh.

== Bibliography ==
- Gupta, Hari Ram, ed. (1975). Panjab on the Eve of First Sikh War: A Documentary Study of the Political, Social, and Economic Conditions of the Panjab as Depicted in the Daily Letters Written Chiefly from Lahore by British Intelligencers During the Period from 30 December 1843 to 31 October 1844 (2nd rev. ed.). Chandigarh: Publication Bureau, Panjab University. ISBN 978-0-88386-653-5.
- Kohli, Sita Ram (1967). Sunset of the Sikh Empire. Orient Longmans. ISBN 9780804688147.
- Chopra, Barkat Rai (1969). Kingdom of the Punjab: 1829–45. Vishveshvaranand Institute.
- Bal, Sarjit Singh (1971). British Policy Towards the Panjab, 1844–49. New Age Publishers. ISBN 9780883860144.
