= Malik Umar Hayat Khan =

Indian soldier and landowner (1874–1944)

Major General Sir Umar Hayat Khan GBE KCIE MVO
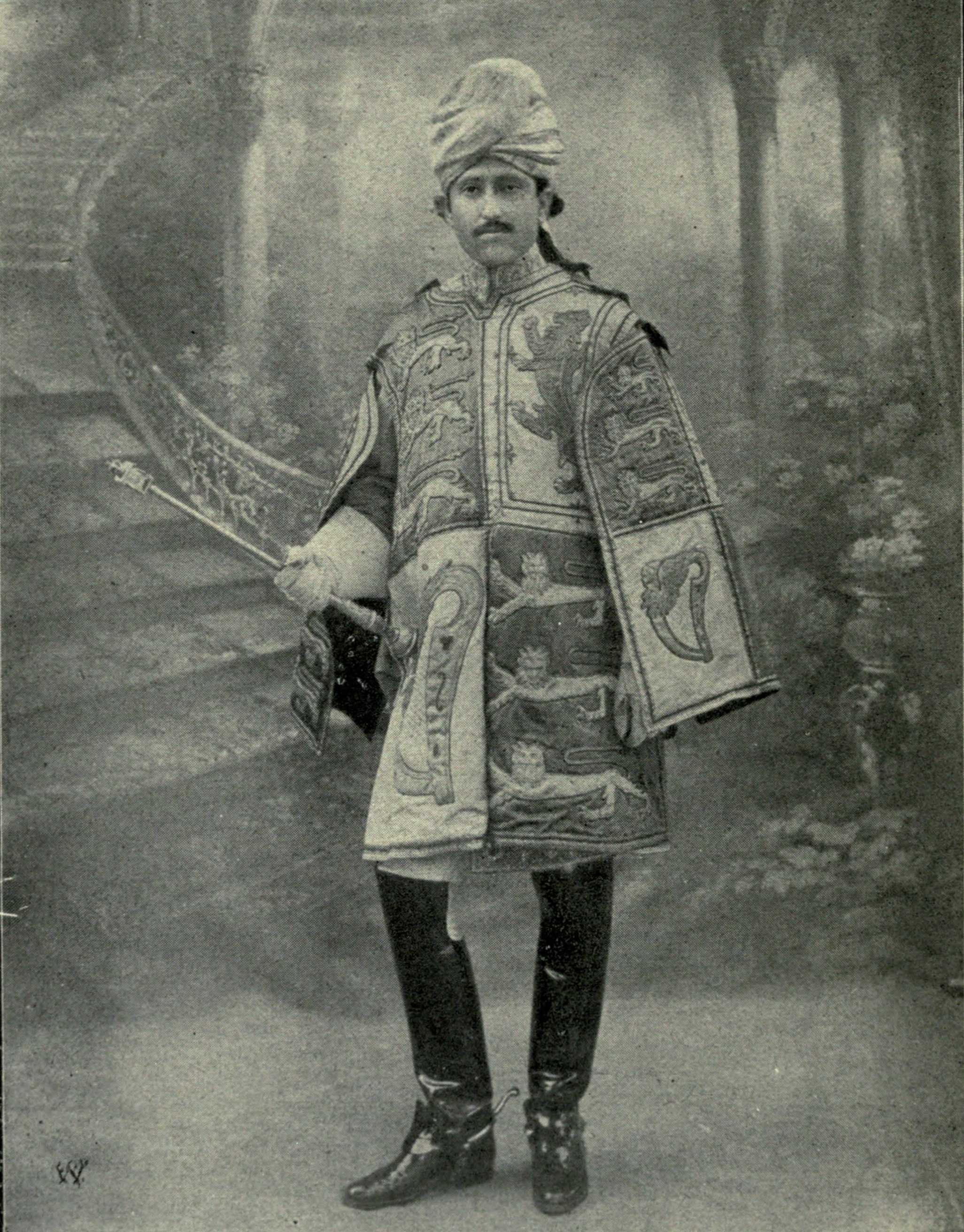
- Khan as Assistant Delhi Herald, 1911
- Born: 5 October 1874; Megha, Jhawarian, Punjab, British India (now in Punjab, Pakistan)
- Died: 24 March 1944 (aged 69); Kalra Estate, Jhawarian, Punjab, British India
- Alma mater: Aitchison College
- Military career
- Allegiance: British India
- Branch: British Indian Army
- Rank: Major General
- Units: 18th King George's Own Lancers; 19th King George's Own Lancers
- Conflicts: Somaliland War; British expedition to Tibet; World War I Third Anglo-Afghan War

Major General Nawab Sir Umar Hayat Khan Tiwana GBE KCIE MVO (5 October 1874 – 24 March 1944), was a soldier of the Indian Empire, one of the largest landholders in the Punjab, and an elected member of the Council of State of India.

== Background and early life ==
He was born in a Megha, Jhawarian, Punjab. His father was Sir Malik Sahib Khan and his family, from Khushab, were part of the Rajput Tiwana Family. Khan was educated at Aitchison Chiefs College, Lahore between 1888 and 1893.

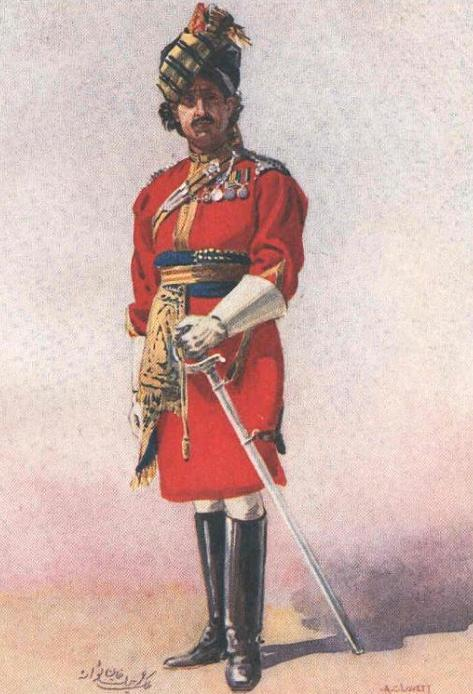
Sir Malik Umar Hayat Khan as an Honorary Lieutenant of the 18th King George's Own Lancers, early 20th century (watercolour by Major A.C. Lovett (1862–1919)).

== Military service ==
Khan served in the Somaliland War of 1902–1904, receiving the Jidballi medal and clasp, the British expedition to Tibet of 1903-1904 (for which he was Mentioned in Despatches), the European theatre of the Great War between 1914 and 1915 (during which he was Mentioned in Despatches a further six times), and then in the Third Anglo-Afghan War. He was attached to the 18th King George's Own Lancers and later the 19th King George's Own Lancers.

He acted as an honorary aide-de-camp to George V, Edward VIII, and George VI.

== Public life ==
In 1907, moving beyond his career as a soldier, the management of his family estates in the Punjab, and his role as an hereditary Provincial Darbari, Khan became an Attaché to HM the Amir of Afghanistan. He served as a member of the Governor-General of India's Imperial Council from 1910 to 1944.

In 1910, in the Imperial legislature, Khan called for Europeans to supervise districts as "...disinterested men to safeguard the interests of all".

At the Delhi Durbar of 1911, Khan acted as Assistant Herald to Brigadier General William Peyton, the Delhi Herald Extraordinary.

In December 1913, he was elected as one of the seventeen officers of the All-India Muslim League, at the League's Seventh Session held at Agra. He was instrumental in ensuring ex-servicemen were enfranchised in the Montagu–Chelmsford Reforms of 1919.

He was a member of the Council of the Secretary of State for India from 1924 to 1934, as well as becoming an elected member of the Council of State and a member of the Punjab Legislative Council for two terms.

In a deposition for a case in the High Court in 1924, Khan was described as "Colonel Sir Malik Umar Hayat Khan Tiwana KCIE, CEI, MVO, Zamindar of forty-eight thousand bighas at Shapur, Rawalpindi, Honorary Magistrate 1st Class".

== London ==
From 1929 to 1934, he spent most of his time in London, joining the conservative Carlton Club and becoming President of the British Falconers' Club. He can be credited with taking Sultan Khan, a talented chess player whose career he promoted whilst in the United Kingdom to London. While Sultan Khan did not even know chess notation, he was nevertheless a worthy match for the top British and even international chess players.

In London he resided in the 10 Prince Albert Road, Regent's Park, and held an open house every weekend. Choudhry Rahmat Ali was a regular guest of his during this time and his Now or Never pamphlet was partly penned at the residence.

== O'Dwyer v. Nair libel case ==
In 1924, Khan appeared as a significant witness in the O'Dwyer v. Nair libel case, heard in the High Court in London over five weeks from 30 April 1924.

Sir Michael O'Dwyer, Lieutenant-Governor of the Punjab until 1919, sued Sir Chettur Sankaran Nair in a case concerning matters arising from the Amritsar Massacre and the Punjab Disturbances of 1919, and in particular recruiting abuses in the Punjab between 1917 and 1918. The case turned into one of the longest civil hearings in English legal history up to that time.

Khan, appearing as a witness for O'Dwyer, stated that there had been a recruiting quota, namely one third of all villagers of military age. He described the killing of Tahsildar Sayyad Nadir Hussain in Lakk by villagers who strongly objected to his approach to recruiting, and an attack by 1,000 rioters on police seeking to enforce recruitment warrants, resulting in the killing of some of the rioters. Under cross examination, he admitted that there had been a "white book" and a "black book", in which village headmen who met recruitment targets and those who did not were listed.

O'Dwyer won his case, with the sole dissenting member of the jury being the political philosopher Harold Laski.

== Personal life ==
His son Malik Khizar Hayat Tiwana went on to become the last Premier of the Punjab.

== Honours ==
- Africa General Service Medal with clasp Jidballi, 1903
- Delhi Durbar Medal, 1903
- Delhi Durbar Medal, 1911
- Member of the Royal Victorian Order, Fourth class (MVO), 1911
- Knight Commander of the Order of the Indian Empire (KCIE), 1916 (CIE: 1906 King's Birthday Honours)
- Nawab (personal title only), 1929
- Knight Grand Cross of the Order of the British Empire (GBE), 1934 King's Birthday Honours (CBE: 1919 King's Birthday Honours)
- Honorary Magistrate (first class)
- President of the Falconers' Club

Malik Muhammad Umar Hayat Khan Towana had strictly forbidden the administration that the administration should not employ anyone from his father's state in government jobs, the reason being that Malik did not want the people of his state to behave like the rulers of the British. The residents of the state had to pay fees, that's why there were very few Hindus in Kalra state and in their place, very few refugees came to Kalra state at the time of partition.

=== Military promotions ===
- Honorary Lieutenant in the Indian Army, 1901
- Honorary Captain in the Indian Army, 1911
- Honorary Major in the Indian Army, 1917
- Honorary Lieutenant-Colonel in the Indian Army, 1920
- Honorary Colonel in the Indian Army, 1930
- Honorary Major General, Indian Army, 1935
- Honorary Colonel of 18th King George's Own Lancers
- Honorary Extra Aide-de-camp to George V, 1930
- Honorary Extra Aide-de-camp to Edward VIII, 1935
- Honorary Extra Aide-de-camp to George VI, 1936 to 1944
