= Bakhar Bar =

- Village
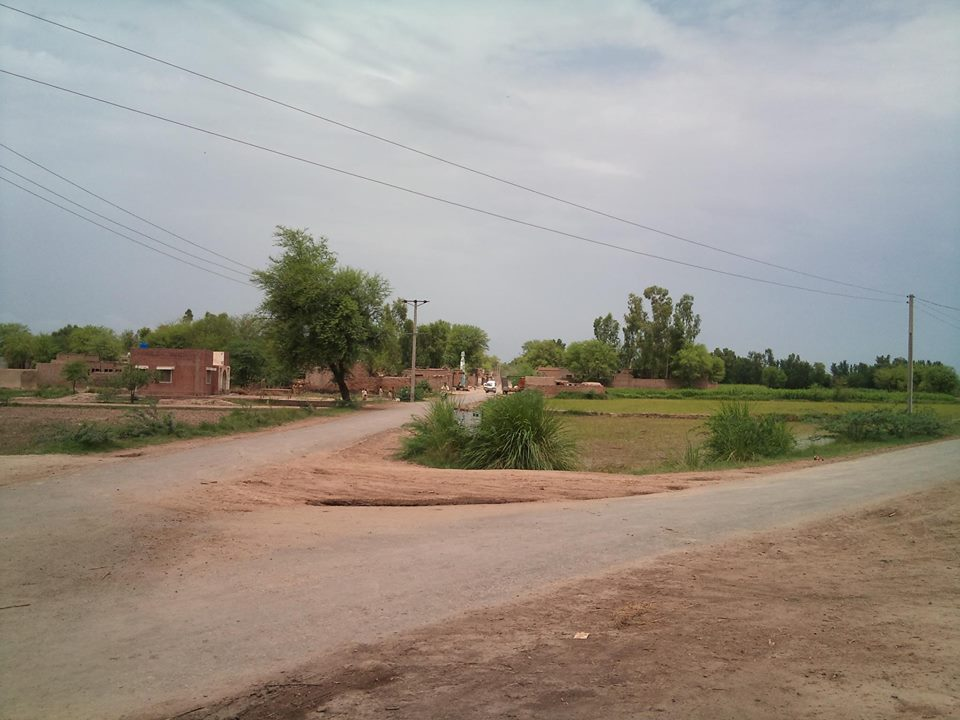
- Bakhar Bar village entrance

- Location in Pakistan
- Country: Pakistan
- Province: Punjab, Pakistan
- District: Sargodha
- Tehsil: Shahpur

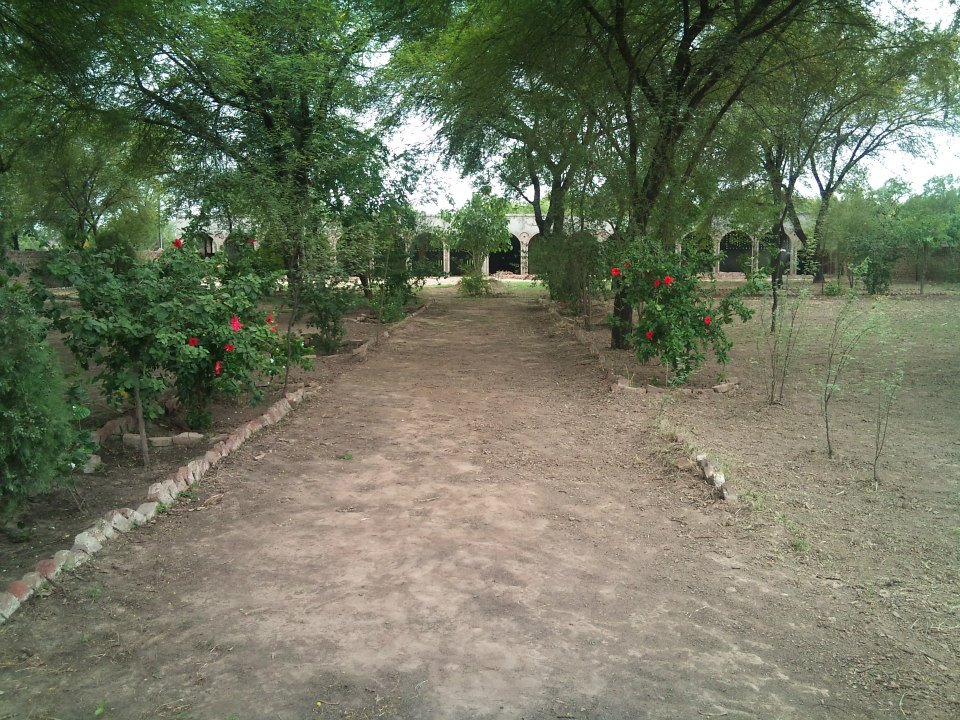
Bakhar Bar Eidgah

Bakhar Bar is a village and union council near Shahpur Sadar, in Sargodha District in the Punjab province of Pakistan. The village is named after by the tribe caste "Bakhar" and they used to write Maher as their sub-caste. It is situated on the eastern side of the river Jhelum. It is at about 5 kilometers from Shahpur Sadar, and about 35 kilometers from Sargodha. Agricultural land owned by its inhabitants covers 14,000 acres (57 km^{2}), and its population is around 22,000. And, it is largest village of Punjab in term of area which is occupied by a single tribe Bakhar since centuries. The main crops of Bakhar Bar are sugarcane, wheat, oranges and rice. Bakhar Bar is about 900 years old. The main occupation of the people is farming; however, a large number of people work in the government service.Bakhar Bar is famous for jts historical Temple which was constructed before Partition of Pakistan and India
