= Makuana =

Makkuana
- Union Council
- Makkuana Chak 229 RB
- Location within Punjab, Pakistan Location within Pakistan
- Coordinates: 31°22′49.2″N 73°12′30.2″E
- Country: Pakistan
- Province: Punjab
- District: Faisalabad District
- Administrative divisions: Jaranwala Tehsil

Government
- Elevation: 184 m (604 ft)
- Time zone: UTC+5 (PST)
- Postal code: 38801
- Calling code: 041

Makuana Chak 229 RB (Urdu, چک 229 ر ب مکوانہ) on Faisalabad–Jaranwala Road at Faisalabad Ring Road bypass is a town of Jaranwala Tehsil, Faisalabad District, Pakistan. Makuana has high schools for boys and girls. The peripheries of Faisalabad city now reaches up to Makuana.

== Education ==
Schools in the area include:

- Allied School (Mian Ali Campus)
- Jamiatul Awaisia AlBashirul Uloom (Markaz Al Awaisia)
- Govt. High School for Boys
- Govt. High School for Girls
- Al-Bahadur Public High School
- Al-Shahbaz Public High School
- Tariq Pilot High School
- Jamia Manzoor-ul-Quran
- TCF school
