= Government Degree College Jaranwala =

Government college in Pakistan

Government Degree College Jaranwala is the only government college of Jaranwala Tehsil of Pakistan. It is the oldest educational institution of Jaranwala. It was established in 1960 in 47 acre area. It is the biggest college by area in Punjab. This college is affiliated with University of Punjab Affiliated with Govt. college university Fsd

== See also ==
- Government Islamia High School Jaranwala
- Govt. College of Commerce, Abdullah Pur, Faisalabad
