= Government Municipal Degree College, Faisalabad =

College in Faisalabad, Pakistan

- Location within Punjab, Pakistan Location within Pakistan
- Coordinates: 31°25′08.5″N 73°06′24.4″E
- Website: www.gmdc.edu.pk

Government Municipal Degree College, Faisalabad,گورنمنٹ میونسپل ڈگری کالج فیصل آباد , previously known as Lyallpur Khalsa College, (خالصہ کالج لائل پور) Faisalabad, is a college in Faisalabad, Pakistan.

It was founded by Sunder Singh Lyallpuri in 1908 in the building of Lyallpur Sangh Sabha as Khalsa High School.

Tara Singh was the first headmaster of the school. The school was upgraded to a degree college in 1928.

== Notable alumni ==
- Prithviraj Kapoor, actor

== See also ==
- Govt. College of Commerce, Abdullah Pur, Faisalabad
