= Government College of Commerce, Abdullahpur, Faisalabad =

College in Faisalabad, Pakistan

Govt. Graduate College, Abdullah Pur, Faisalabad
- Affiliations: Government College University, Faisalabad, Pakistan
- Location: Abdullah Pur, Faisalabad, Pakistan; 31°25′11.1″N 73°06′27.″E
- Location in Punjab, Pakistan Government College of Commerce, Abdullahpur, Faisalabad (Pakistan)

Govt. Graduate College, Abdullah Pur, Faisalabad ( گورنمنٹ گریجویٹ کالج فیصل آباد ) is adjacent to Government Municipal Degree College, Faisalabad Govt. College of Commerce, Abdullah Pur, Faisalabad is affiliated with Government College University, Faisalabad.

== Degree Program ==
- Associate Degree in Commerce
- Masters in Commerce M.Com.
- BS Commerce
- BS Economics
- BBA (Bachelors of Business Administration)
- BS Accounting and Finance
- BS English
- Other disciplines:
  - I.Com
  - ICS (Statistics and Economics)
  - FA (IT)

== See also ==
- Government Municipal Degree College, Faisalabad
- Government Degree College Jaranwala
- Institute of Chartered Accountants of Pakistan
