= Shahzadi Umerzadi Tiwana =

Pakistani politician

Member of the National Assembly of Pakistan
- In office 1 October 2002 – 31 May 2018
- Constituency: Reserved seat for women

Personal details
- Born: 9 December 1960 (age 65) Lahore, Pakistan
- Party: Pakistan Muslim League (N)
- Relatives: Khizar Hayat Khan Tiwana (father)
- Education: Kinnaird College; University of the Punjab

Shahzadi Umerzadi Tiwana (Punjabi and Urdu: شہزادی عمرزادی ٹوانہ; born 9 December 1960) is a Pakistani politician who was a member of the National Assembly of Pakistan from October 2002 to May 2018.

== Early life and education ==
She was born on 9 December 1960 in Lahore, West Pakistan. Her father was Sir Malik Khizar Hayat Tiwana, who served as Premier of the Punjab between 1942 and 1947.

She graduated from Kinnaird College for Women University in 1982 and received the degree of Master of Arts in Economics from University of the Punjab.

== Political career ==
She was elected to the National Assembly of Pakistan as a candidate of Pakistan Muslim League (Q) (PML-Q) from Punjab on a reserved seat for women in the 2002 Pakistani general election. During her tenure as member of the National Assembly, she served as Federal Parliamentary Secretary for Water and Power.

She was elected to the Provincial Assembly of the Punjab as a candidate of Pakistan Muslim League (N) (PML-N) from Constituency PP-38 (Sarghoda-XI) in the 2008 Pakistani general election. She received 57,510 votes and defeated Muhammad Munir Qureshi, a candidate of PML-Q.

She was re-elected to the National Assembly of Pakistan as a candidate of PML-N from Punjab on a reserved seat for women in the 2013 Pakistani general election. During her second tenure as Member of the National Assembly, she served as the Federal Parliamentary Secretary for Petroleum and Natural Resources.
