= Tara Singh (activist) =

Indian Sikh political and religious leader (1885–1967)

Master Tara Singh
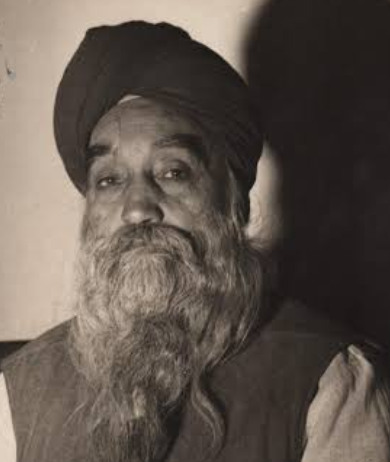
- Born: 24 June 1885; Rawalpindi, Punjab, British India (present-day Pakistan)
- Died: 22 November 1967 (aged 82); Chandigarh, India
- Education: Lyallpur Khalsa College, Lyallpur

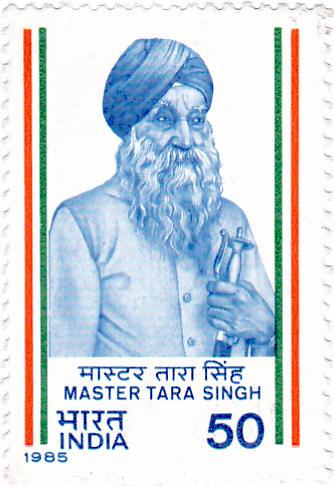
Singh on a 1985 stamp of India

Tara Singh (24 June 1885 – 22 November 1967), born Nanak Chand, was a Sikh political and religious figure in India in the first half of the 20th century. He was instrumental in organising the Shiromani Gurdwara Prabhandak Committee and guiding the Sikhs during the partition of India, which he strongly opposed.

He later led their demand for a Sikh-majority state in East Punjab. His daughter was the Indian journalist and politician Rajinder Kaur.

== Early life ==
Singh was born on 24 June 1885 in Harial, a village in the Tehsil Gujjar Khan, in the Rawalpindi district, Punjab Province in British India into a poor Malhotra Khatri family, as Nanak Chand. Harial was a village of 'Harial' Brahmins, and the village was home to two dharmshalas, one for the Brahmins and one for the Khatris. Growing up in a mixed Hindu and Sikh environment, he learnt stories of Hindu gods and goddesses from his father's widowed sister, while also being exposed to lines of gurbani from his mother. She had learnt the Japuji, the Kirtan Sohila and other shabads from the caretaker of the dharamshala of the Khatris, who was the only keshdhari 'Sikh' in the village.

In 1892, Nanak Chand joined the primary school at Harnal, where he used to stand first in his class. The young Nanak was deeply impressed and inspired by stories of Sikh martyrs and warriors, which he learnt from recitations of the Panth Prakash, implanting the idea of becoming a Sikh in his mind. Unlike his family, Nanak showed little respect to the Brahmins of his village, claiming that they were no better than himself. In one incident, the influential Sikh leader Baba Khem Singh visited the village of Harial to stay in the dharamshala of the Brahmins who always served him well. The young Nanak loudly recited a verse of Guru Nanak that stated that he who called himself a Guru or Pir and went to beg deserved no homage, but rather only those who worked hard to earn their livelihood and gave something to others could recognize the true path.

In 1897, Nanak Chand joined the Mission High School at Rawalpindi. In 1901, while returning to Rawalpindi along with some other boys of his village, he was persuaded to go to Dera Khalsa where Sant Attar Singh was staying at the time. Nanak Chand received amrit from Attar Singh and was converted to a Sikh, receiving the new name Tara Singh. In 1903, Tara Singh joined the Lyallpur Khalsa College, Lyallpur, where he stood first in the quarterly tests in religious studies and the Faculty of Arts and thus received a scholarship. He was routinely involved in religious debates with other students, and was enthusiastic about religion. Being foremost in sports, he emerged as the leader of other students. In 1907, Tara Singh became involved in student politics, becoming the president of a committee protesting against growing bureaucratic interference in the affairs of the Khalsa College. He left the college in the same year after giving his BA examination.

As a form of reaction to the taking over of the Khalsa College by the British administrators, Tara Singh joined the Training College at Lahore to qualify for teaching, discussing with his peers the possibility of opening a Khalsa school. The Arya Samajists, who had provided leadership to the Sikhs in the agitation of 1907, were thinking of opening a high school in Lyallpur. Tara Singh and his peers offered their teaching services for a year to the Bar Khalsa Diwan if such a high school was opened. Their offer was accepted and the Khalsa High School was set up at Lyallpur in 1908. Tara Singh, being only twenty-three at the time, was made its Headmaster. This started the use of "Master" as a prefix to his name.

== Political career ==
Singh was ardent in his desire to promote and protect the cause of Sikhism. This often put him at odds with civil authorities and he was jailed on 14 occasions for civil disobedience between 1930 and 1966. Early examples of his support for civil disobedience came through his close involvement with the movement led by Mahatma Gandhi. He became a leader of the Shiromani Akali Dal (SAD) political party, which was the major force in Sikh politics, and he was similarly involved with the Shiromani Gurdwara Parbandhak Committee (Supreme Committee of Gurdwara Management), an apex body that dealt with the Sikh places of worship known as gurdwaras.

He was instrumental in getting the Sikh State resolution passed by Akali Dal under his leadership in 1946, which declared Punjab as the natural homeland of the Sikhs. He also advocated for a "Azad Punjab" (Free Punjab) before demanding the independent nation of "Sikhistan" at the time. He later led their demand for a Sikh-majority state in East Punjab. A devout worker for the cause of Sikh religious and political integrity, Tara Singh often found himself in opposition to Indian Government. He was jailed for civil disobedience 14 times between 1930 and 1966. In the 2020 biography of former Punjab CM Partap Singh Kairon, it has been documented that Tara Singh revived his demand for a separate nation for Sikhs after Independence. In 2018, his granddaughter in law mentioned that Master Tara Singh's "dream of an autonomous Sikh state in India remains unfulfilled."

=== Partition of India ===
As with other Sikh organisations, Singh and his Shiromani Akali Dal (SAD) condemned the Lahore Resolution and the movement to create Pakistan, viewing it as welcoming possible persecution; he thus strongly opposed the partition of India, saying that he and his party would fight "tooth and nail" against the concept of a Pakistan.

=== Independent India ===
Singh's most significant cause was the creation of a distinct Punjabi-speaking state. He believed that this would best protect the integrity of Sikh religious and political traditions. He began a hunger strike in 1961 at the Golden Temple in Amritsar, promising to continue it to his death unless the then Prime Minister of India, Jawaharlal Nehru agreed to his demand for such a state. Nehru argued that India was a secular country and the creation of a state based on religious distinction was inappropriate. Nonetheless, Nehru did promise to consider the issue. Singh abandoned his fast after 48 days. Singh's fellow Sikhs turned against him, believing that he had capitulated, and they put him on trial in a court adjudged by pijaras. Singh pleaded guilty to the charges laid against him and found his reputation in tatters. The community felt he had abandoned his ideals and replaced him in the SAD.

The linguistic division of the Indian state of Punjab eventually took place in 1966, with the Hindi-speaking areas redesignated as a part of the state of Haryana. Singh himself died in Chandigarh on 22 November 1967.
