= Malik Sahib Khan Tiwana =

Indian military leader

Malik Sahib Khan Tiwana CSI (died 1879) was a Punjabi Muslim Rajput landowner during the British India.

== Biography ==
Sahib Khan was born into the Rajput Tiwana family of Shahpur, the son of Ahmad Yar Khan Tiwana. On hearing news of the Indian Rebellion of 1857, he requested and received permission to raise 200 men of his clan for the service of the Government. He assisted in disarming the mutiny in Jhelum and was present at the destruction of the 26th Native Infantry. He thereafter marched to Hindustan where he assisted at Calpi. So impressed were the British by his Tiwana irregulars, that the detachment was incorporated into the 2nd Mahratta Horse at Gwalior. As a reward for he received a land grant of nearly 9,000 acres in Kalpi, a jagir for life worth 1,200 rupees and the title Khan Bahadur. In 1863 he built the first privately built canal on state-leased land in the Punjab. His control of both land and water generated immense political and economic influence over his tenants. He died in 1879 when his son Malik Umar Hayat Khan was still a minor. Malik Sahib Khan Tiwana served in military service as well as in administrative positions. Malik Sahib Khan Tiwana was three times the administrator of Lakki Marwat, which is now a district headquarter of the Khyber Pakhtunkhwa province of Pakistan. The grave of Malik Sahib Khan Tiwana is in Kalra Jhawarian.
