= Behra =

Village in Jaunpur, Uttar Pradesh, India

Coordinates: 26.9909°N 84.6449°E

Behra is a village in Jaunpur, Uttar Pradesh, India.

Behra is a last name originating from the Marwar region of present-day Rajasthan, India.
