= Government Islamia High School Jaranwala =

School in Pakistan

Coordinates: 31.34011°N 73.42570°E

Government Islamia High School Jaranwala is a high school of Jaranwala for boys from 6th Grade to 10th Gradeis established in 1953. Boys of nearby villages and Jaranwala city studied here. It was established as private school and in 1972 it was nationalized by Government of Pakistan. It is near Jaranwala–Nankana Road.

== See also ==
- Government Degree College Jaranwala
- Chak 236 GB Kilanwala
