= Government Christian Higher Secondary School, Rawalpindi =

School and former college in Pakistan

Mission High School, Rawalpindi

Location
- Karachi, Pakistan
- Coordinates: 33°36′48″N 73°03′23″E

Information
- Former name: Mission High School, Rawalpindi
- Type: Public school
- Established: 1856; 170 years ago

Government Christian Higher Secondary School, commonly known as Mission High School, Rawalpindi is a government school located in Raja Bazaar, Rawalpindi, Pakistan. It is one of the oldest school in Rawalpindi.

== History ==
It was founded in 1856 by American Presbyterian Mission. Originally it was called Mission High School, and for the people it is still a missionary school. The school was affiliated with Calcutta University.

In 1893, the school was upgraded to a college, and in 1902, this college segment was relocated and renamed as Gordon College, while the school remained at its original site.

In 1970, the school was nationalized and came under the administration of the Government of Punjab, Pakistan. Post-nationalization, there has been a noted decline in the school's educational standards. The school's land area has decreased from 37 kanals to 20 kanals over the years.

In 2001, the Presbyterian Mission Lahore tried to acquire the school again, but it was opposed by the Punjab Teachers Association.

== Notable alumni ==
- Sikander Hayat Khan, prime minister of Punjab
- Shaikh Din Muhammad, Governor of Sindh
- Feroz Khan Noon, prime minister of Pakistan
- Sheikh Rashid Ahmed, Pakistani politician
- Malik Shakeel Awan, Pakistani politician
