= Shahpur Tehsil, Pakistan =

Administrative division in Punjab, Pakistan

Shahpur Tehsil
- Tehsil
- Country: Pakistan
- Province: Punjab
- District: Sargodha District
- Seat: Shahpur

Area
  - Total: 787 km^{2} (304 sq mi)

Population (2017 Pakistani census)
  - Total: 353,325
- Time zone: UTC+5 (PST)

Shahpur Tehsil is an administrative subdivision (tehsil) of Sargodha District in the Punjab province of Pakistan.

Its capital is Shahpur. The tehsil is administratively subdivided into union councils and had a population of 353,325 according to the 2017 census.

The population is predominantly Muslim and Punjabi-speaking.

== History ==
Shahpur was historically an important administrative centre in the region. In 1914, the district headquarters were moved from Shahpur to Sargodha, although the district continued to be known as Shahpur District for some time. In 1960, Sargodha District was formally established, and Shahpur became a tehsil within the district.

== Geography ==
Shahpur Tehsil covers an area of approximately 787 square kilometres, making it one of the larger tehsils of Sargodha District. The area mainly consists of fertile plains suitable for agriculture. The Jhelum River flows along the western and north-western boundaries of the tehsil.

== Administration ==
The tehsil is divided into multiple union councils, which serve as the basic units of local governance.

== Union councils ==
The union councils of Shahpur Tehsil include:

1. Jhawarian
2. Khawaja Abad
3. Kalra
4. Manke Wala
5. Ghangwal
6. Kot Bhai Khan
7. Kot Pehlwan
8. Bakhar Bar
9. Shahpur Saddar (Urban)
10. Aqil Shah
11. Shahpur City (Urban)
12. Kandan
13. Mangowal
14. Jahan Abad
15. Sabowal
16. Jalalpur Jadeed
17. Gondal
18. Chakrala

== Transportation ==
Shahpur Tehsil is connected by a network of roads, including the Sargodha–Mianwali Road, Bhera–Jhawarian Road, and Shahpur–Bhalwal Road. It is also served by a railway station at Shahpur Saddar, providing connectivity to other parts of the region.

== Notable people ==
The tehsil has produced several civil servants and public officials:

- Mian Ismail Qureshi – former Federal Secretary
- Mian Zafar Ahmed Qureshi – former Inspector General of Police
- Mian Muhammad Asif Qureshi – former Secretary to Government of Punjab
- Fazal Abbas Maken – former Federal Secretary
- Mubashir Maken – Police Service of Pakistan
- Haseeb Ashraf Maken – Police Service of Pakistan
- Dr. Rana Haseeb Ahmad – Pakistan Administrative Service

== See also ==
- Sargodha District
- Punjab, Pakistan
