= Jaranwala–Nankana Road =

Road in Punjab, Pakistan

- جڑانوالہ ننكانہ سڑک

Route information
- Maintained by Punjab Highway Department
- Length: 30 km (19 mi)

Major junctions
- From: Islampura, Jaranwala
- To: Nankana

Location
- Country: Pakistan

Highway system
- Roads in Pakistan

Jaranwala–Nankana Road (Punjabi, Urdu: جڑانوالہ ننكانہ سڑک), also known locally as Nankana Road is a provincially maintained road in Punjab Pakistan that extends from Jaranwala to Nankana.
