= Shahpur, Punjab =

Pakistani town

Shahpur شاہ پور
- City
- Location within Punjab, Pakistan Location within Pakistan
- Coordinates: 32°17′55″N 72°35′5″E
- Country: Pakistan
- Province: Punjab
- District: Sargodha District
- Elevation: 210 m (690 ft)

Population (2017 Pakistani census)
  - Total: 14,819
- Time zone: UTC+5 (PST)
- Calling code: 048

Shahpur (Punjabi,Urdu: شاه پور) is a city and capital of Shahpur Tehsil located in Sargodha District in the Punjab province of Pakistan. It lies on the Jhelum River. Shahpur is distributed in two sectors, Shahpur Sadar and Shahpur City.

== History ==
Shahpur is named after the famous shrine of Syed Shams Shah Shirazi, who arrived here in 1606. He was son of Syed Sher Ali Shirazi who was the Chief Justice in Emperor Humayun's (1508 – 1556) Court in Delhi in 1555. Syed Shams Shirazi was married to a noble lady Malika Sultana who owned the Khushab Jagir. Shah Shams Shirazi attracted huge crowds & thousands of locals embraced Islam on the hands of this saint and scholar. During British raj, Shahpur was declared as district headquarters. In 1893, during the British Raj, Shahpur District was created with Shahpur as the district headquarters. In 1914, the district headquarters were moved from Shahpur to Sargodha, although the district continued to be known as Shahpur. In 1960 however, Sargodha District was created, and Shahpur District became Shahpur Tehsil — one of the tehsils in the district.

== CSPs from Shahpur Tehsil ==
- Sardar Ghulam Mubashir Maken Police Service of Pakistan 33rd Common
- Haseeb Ashraf Maken Police Service of Pakistan 49th Common
- Dr. Rana Haseeb Ahmad Pakistan Administrative Service 50th Common
