= Jaranwala =

City in Punjab, Pakistan

Jaranwala: جڑانوالا; جڑانوالہ
- City
- Jaranwala
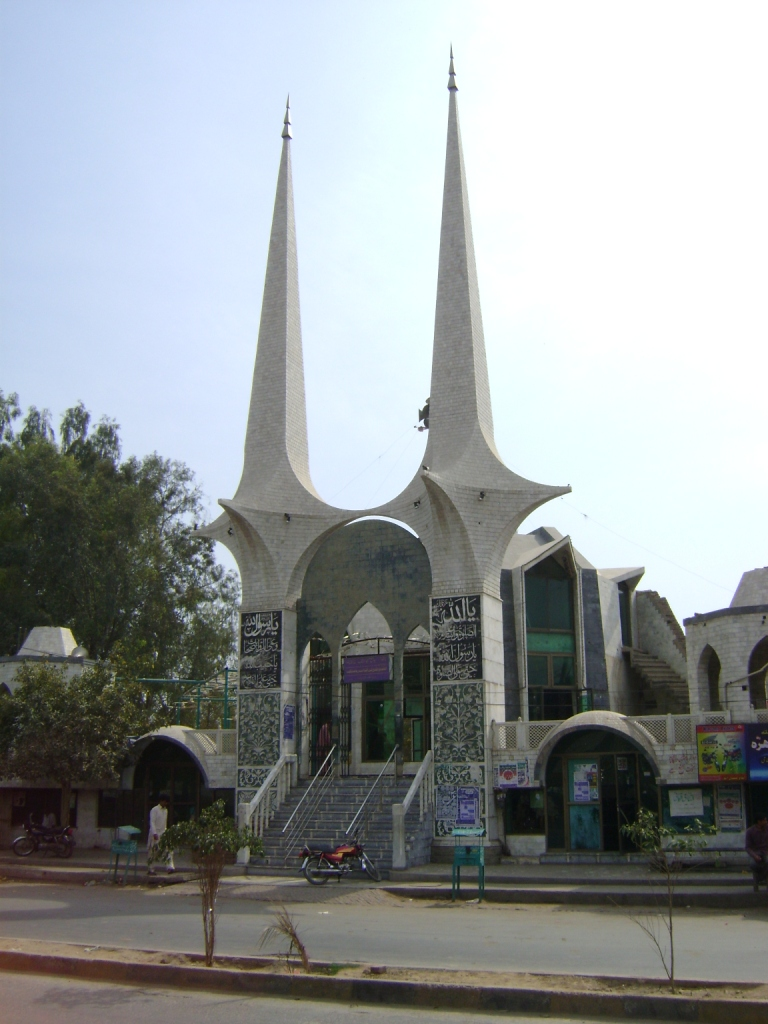
- The town's modernist Mehtab Mosque

- Location within Punjab, Pakistan Location within Pakistan
- Coordinates: 31°20′0″N 73°25′0″E
- Country: Pakistan
- Province: Punjab
- Division: Faisalabad
- District: Faisalabad

Government
  - Type: Municipal Committee
  - Administrator / Chairman: Rangzaib Goraya
  - Chief Officer: Mohsin Mazhar
- Elevation: 184 m (604 ft)

Population (2023)
  - City: 170,872
  - Rank: 63rd in Pakistan
- Time zone: UTC+5 (PST)
- Calling code: 041
- Website: Jaranwala.com

Jaranwala (Punjabi: جڑانوالا; Urdu: جڑانوالہ) is a city and the capital of Jaranwala Tehsil located in the Faisalabad District of Punjab, Pakistan. It is the 63rd most populous city in Pakistan.

== Geography ==
It is located at 31°20'0N 73°26'0E with an altitude of 184 meters (606 feet). It is located 35 km southeast of Faisalabad and 110 km from Lahore. The city serves as the headquarters of Jaranwala Tehsil, an administrative subdivision of the district.

== Etymology ==
Jaranwala'a name originates from a Bohar, Bargad Banyan tree known as Jaranwala Bohar. Jaranwala is combination of two Punjabi words: Jaran and Wala, where Jaran means "roots" and "Wala" means place.

== History ==
The existing city was founded by the British government in 1908. Deputy commissioner Micheal Ferrar of Faisalabad inaugurated the town in 1909 and Sir Ganga Ram designed the city.

== Pakistani Gate ==
The Pakistani Gate is a central point and historical monument in Jaranwala. In January 1917, Harbel Singh a well-known mill owner, factory owner and landlord, maternal grandfather of Khushwant Singh and father-in-law of Sir Sobha Singh, notified the area committee of Jaranwala to construct a wooden gate to welcome the Lieutenant Governor of Punjab, Sir Michael Francis O'Dwyer, in Jaranwala. After his visit, the gate was named O'Dwyer Gate. However, after the Jallianwala Bagh massacre, the people demanded to rename the gate, the name of O'Dwyer was removed from the gate and it was renamed the Railway Gate.

On the visit of Nehru on 1 June 1936, it was renamed the Nehru Gate, and the president of Municipal Committee Jaranawala Lala Harnam Das approved the name on 30 March 1937. The name was changed again after the independence of Pakistan, when the first president of the Municipal Committee of Jaranawala, Syed Altaf Hussain, renamed it the Pakistani Gate. The Pakistani Gate was reconstructed in 1956, 1967 and 2009.

== Demographics ==
Population

Historical population

Year	Pop.	±% p.a.
1951	17,969	—
1961	26,953	+4.14%
1972	46,494	+5.08%
1981	69,459	+4.56%

Year	Pop.	±% p.a.
1998	106,985	+2.57%
2017	150,380	+1.81%
2023	170,872	+2.15%

According to 2023 census, Jaranwala had a population of 170,872. According to the 2017 Census of Pakistan, the population of the Jaranwala MC (Municipal Committee) is 150,380.

Languages

Languages of Jaranwala MC (2023 Census)
1. Punjabi (91.9%)
2. Urdu (7.10%)
3. Pashto (0.40%)
4. Other (0.60%)

== Education ==
Jaranwala has several schools:-

- Government Post Graduate College Jaranwala
- Govt Post Graduate College for Women Jaranwala
- Government High School Jaranwala
- Government Islamia High School Jaranwala
- Govt Girls High School MC 1 Jaranwala
- Govt Girls High School MC 2 Cinema Choke Jaranwala
- Centre of Excellence Jaranwala
- Punjab Group of Colleges Jaranwala Campus
- Commerce College Jaranwala
- Ripah College
- Mian Nazir Hussain Model Secondary School
- AW Grammar school
- Al Raza Grammar school
- Al-Ijaz high school Jaranwala
- The Educators school system (city Campus or New City campus Jaranwala)
- Dare Arqam School System
- The Spirit school system campus
- The Smart school system campus
- Al-Noor Pre-Cadet School Jaranwala
- Sir Syed College Jaranwala
- Faran Public School Jaranwala

== Industry ==
The industrial area of Khurrianwala is part of the Jaranwala Tehsil. Other main industries include:

- Rafhan Maize Products Plant
- Crescent Jute Products Ltd Established in 1965, this was largest jute mill of Pakistan. It has ceased its operations.
- Aslam Textile Mills
- Hussain Sugar Mills
- Lyallpur Chemicals & Fertilizers Limited, Jaranwala
- Shakarganj Food Products Limited

=== Agriculture ===
Jaranwala produces crops including rice, wheat, sugarcane, vegetables, and fruits. Its grain market is one of the busiest markets in Punjab. It is also the biggest consumer of fertilizers by volume in Pakistan.

== Transportation ==
Jaranwala is 10 kilometres (6.2 mi) from the M3 motorway interchange. There are daily bus services from and to Lahore and Faisalabad. There are many trains coming from Lahore on the Shorkot–Sheikhupura Branch Line. The nearest airport is the Faisalabad International Airport, which is approximately 50 kilometres (31 mi) from the city.

=== Main roads ===
There are seven main roads from Jaranwala to other cities.

- Lahore-Jaranwala Road
- Faisalabad-Jaranwala Road
- Jaranwala-Nankana Road
- Jaranwala-Satiana Road
- Jaranwala-Shahkot Road
- Jaranwala-Khurrianwala Road
- Jaranwala-Syedwala Road

== Notable people ==
- Bhagat Singh, freedom fighter in British India
- Mian Abdul Bari- Pakistan Movement
- Shabana Akhtar- Female Olympian in Athletic. Created history when she became the first Pakistani woman to compete at the Olympics when she took part in the women's long jump at the 1996 Atlanta Olympics.
- Nand Lal, Subcontinental freedom fighter, politician and member of the Constituent Assembly of British India from East Punjab
- Munawar Shakeel, Punjabi poet.

== Gallery ==
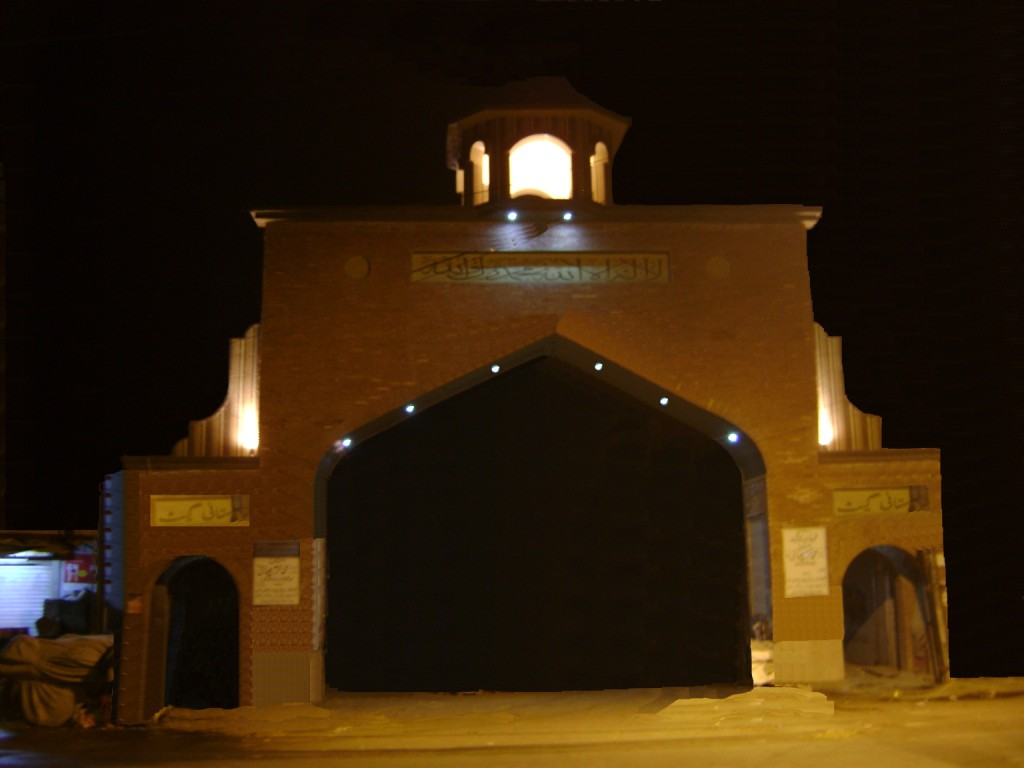
Pakistani Gate

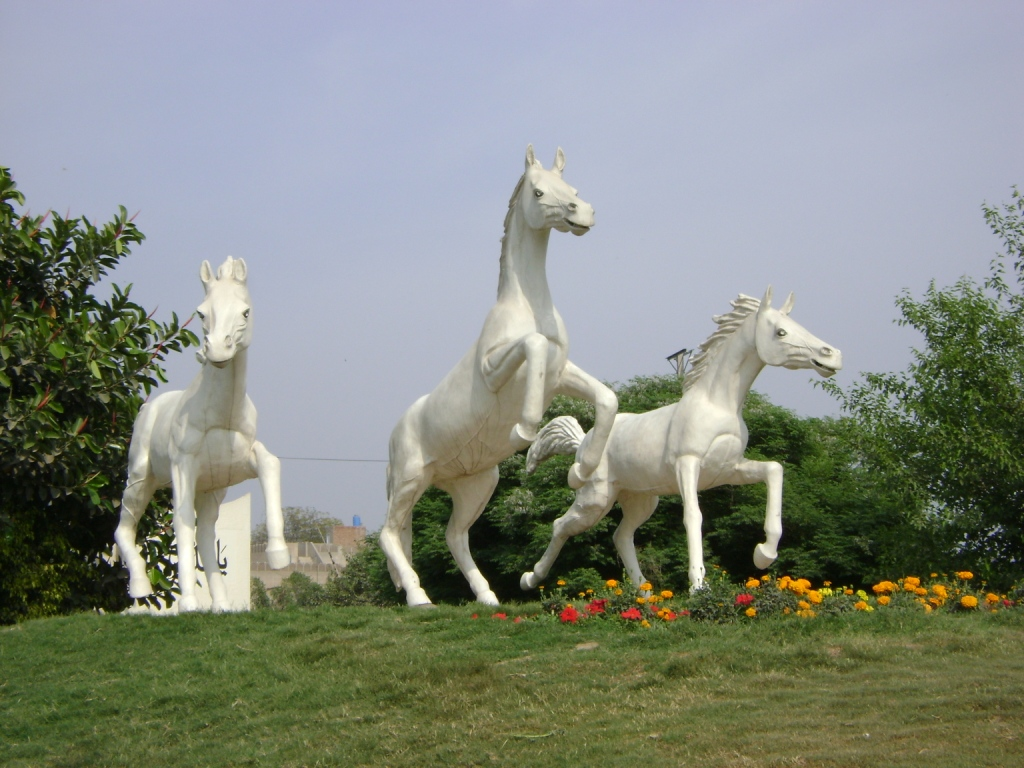
Gate of Jaranwala (Lahore Morr Jaranwala)

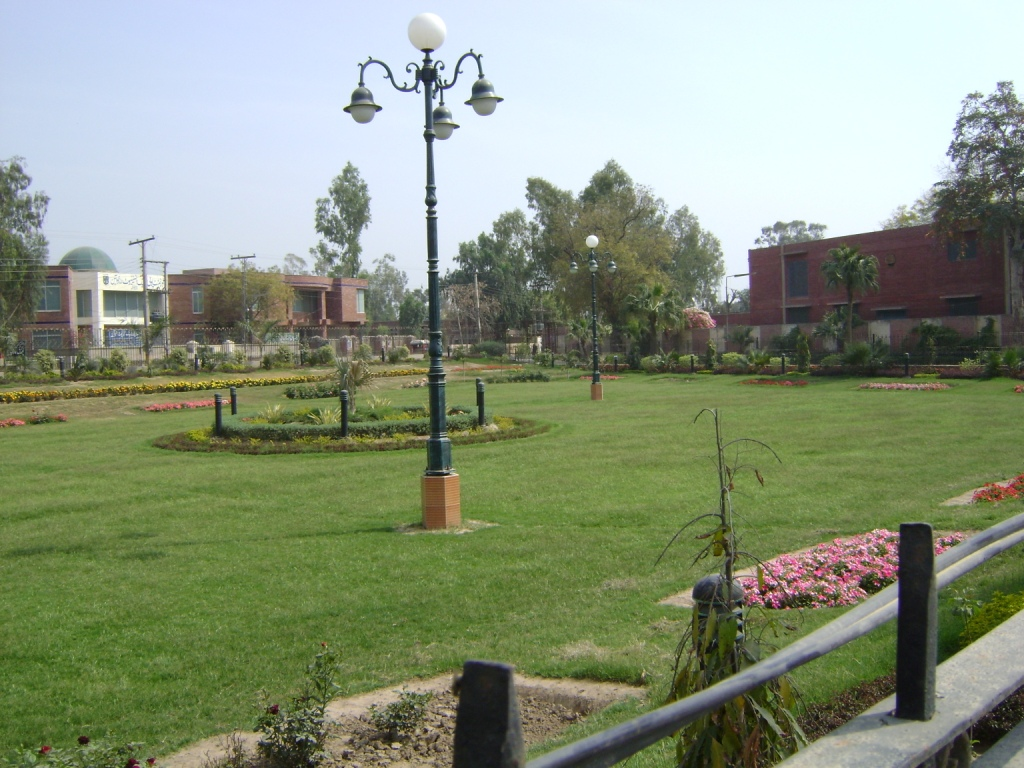
Committee Bagh

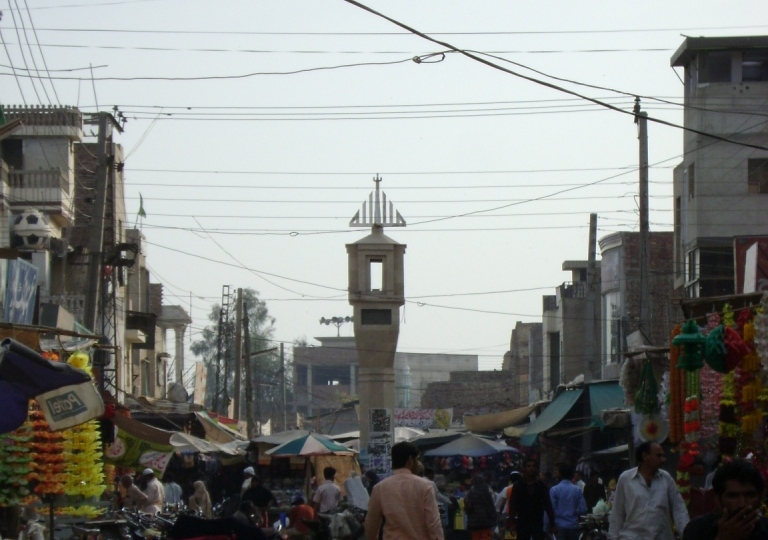
Char Bati Chowk

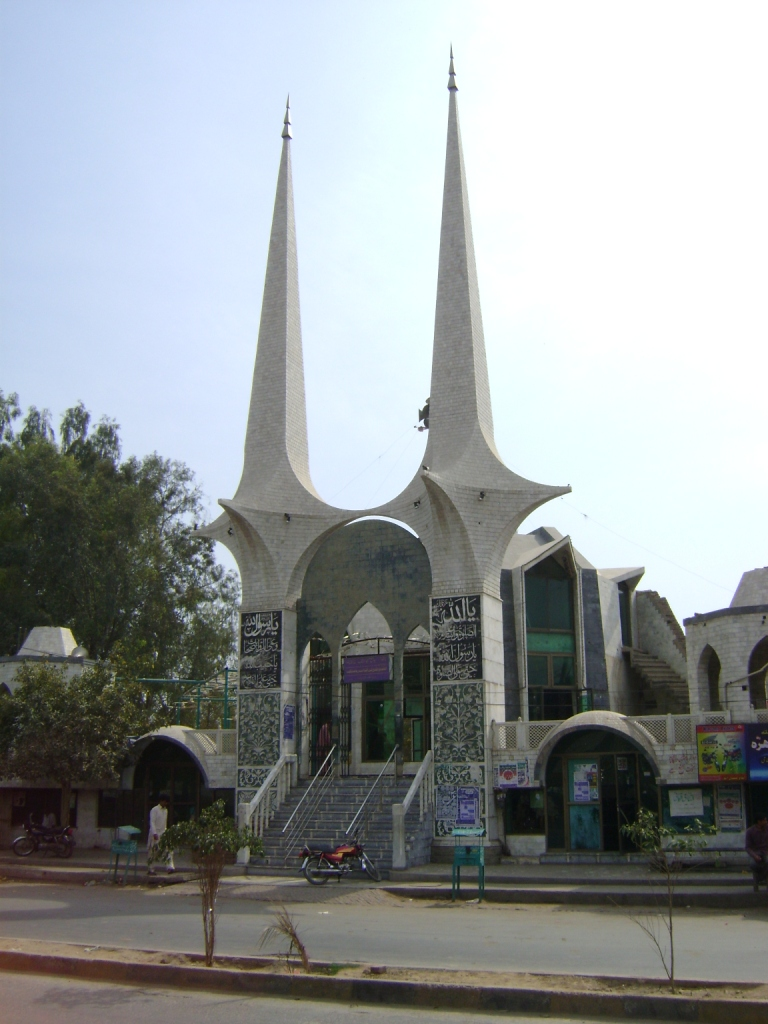
Mahtab Masjid

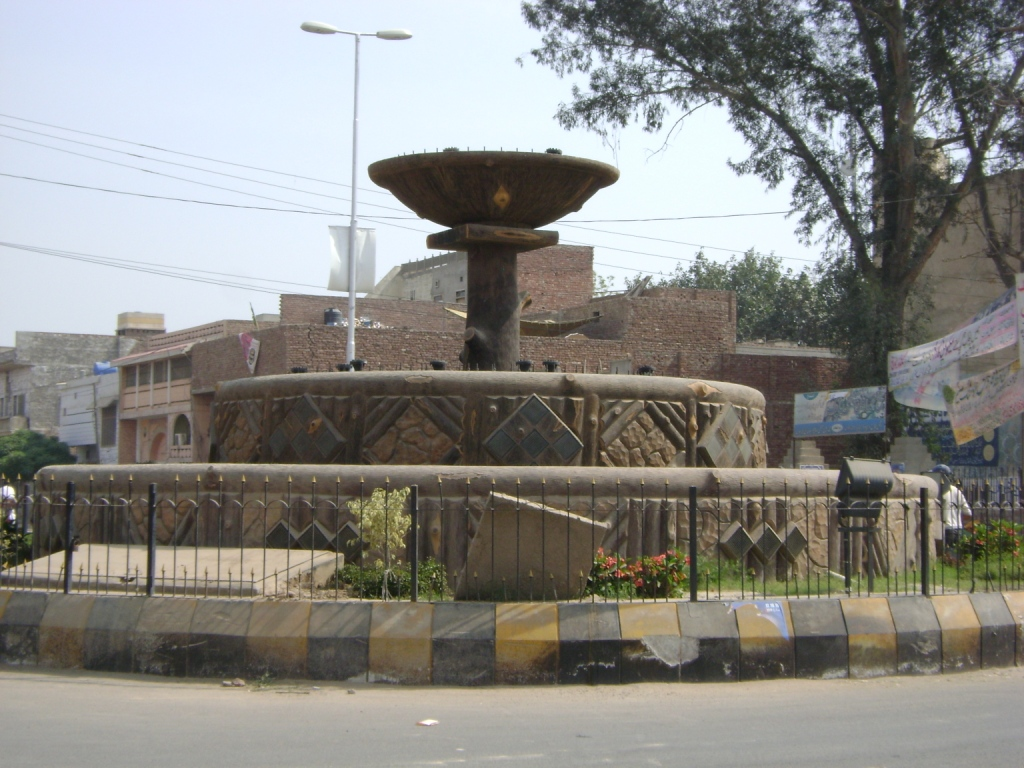
Sabri Chowk

== See also ==
- Jaranwala railway station
- Jaranwala church arsons
