= Jaranwala Tehsil =

Tehsil municipal administration area of Faisalabad, Pakistan

Jaranwala Tehsil تحصیل جڑانوالہ
- Tehsil
- Country: Pakistan
- Region: (Punjab, Pakistan) Punjab
- District: Faisalabad
- Capital: Jaranwala
- Towns: 2
- Union councils: 57

Area
  - Tehsil: 1,770.04 km^{2} (683.42 sq mi)

Population (2017)
  - Tehsil: 1,492,276
  - Urban: 226,256
  - Rural: 1,266,020
- Time zone: UTC+5 (PST)
- Postal code: 0092 431 xxxx

Jaranwala (Punjabi and Urdu: تحصیل جڑانوالہ) is a subdivision (Tehsil) of Faisalabad District in of central Punjab, Pakistan. The industrial area Khurrianwala, is located in Jaranwala, and Makuana. Jaranwala is subdivided into 57 union councils.

== Govt public high school 96RB ==
- Govt primary and Secondary School for Boys ( Chak 57 R.B )
- Govt primary School for Girls ( Chak 57 R.B )
- Govt High School Jaranwala (one of the oldest and biggest school in Punjab province)
- Govt Islamia High School Jaranwala
- Govt Girls High School MC 1 Jaranwala
- Govt Girls High School MC 2 Cinema choke Jaranwala
- Govt. High School For Boys (Chak 353 G.B)
- Govt. Girls High School (Chak 353 G.B)
- Govt Girls Higher Secondary School (Chak 94 GB Shankar Tehsil Jaranwala)
- Govt High School For Boys (Chak 376 G.B)
- Govt Boys Center of Excellence Secondary School (Jaranwala Town)
- Govt Primary School for girls and boys (Chak 238 GB II Kamuana)
- Govt High School 583 gb
- Govt Girls High School 109 RB RODA
- Govt Girls Elementary School 109 RB
- Govt Primary School 109 RB RODA
- Govt Higher Secondary school Awagat
- Govt Higher Secondary school Khurrianwala
- Govt Girls Higher Secondary school Khurrianwala
- Govt Higher Secondary school Satiana
- Govt Girls Higher Secondary school 65 GB
- Govt High School 107 RB
- Govt Girls Elementary School 107 RB
- Govt Primary School 106 RB
- Govt Girls Primary School 106 RB
- Govt Primary School 108 RB
- Govt Girls Primary School 108 RB
- Govt High School 229 RB Makkuana
- Govt Girls Community Model Elementary School 229 RB Makkuana
- Govt Primary School 107 RB West
- Govt Girls Primary School 107 RB West
- Govt Girls High School 108 GB
- Govt High School 108 GB
- Govt Girls High School 105 GB
- Govt High School 105 GB
- Govt Girls Elementary School 106 GB
- Govt Elementary School 106 GB
- Govt Girls Elementary School 107 GB
- Govt Elementary School 107 GB

== Demographics ==
According to the 2017 Census of Pakistan, Jaranwala Tehsil has a population of 1,492,276 and has 228,790 households. Its natives speak the Jatki dialect of Punjabi, while others speak other dialects, such as Majhi and Doabi.
