= Politics of Muzaffargarh =

Overview of the political system of Muzaffargarh, Punjab, Pakistan

Politics of Muzaffargarh مظفرگڑھ کی سیاست
- Polity type: Local, provincial and federal politics

The Politics of Muzaffargarh (Urdu: مظفرگڑھ کی سیاست) takes place at the municipal, provincial and federal levels of the government. ؐMuzaffargarh is a diverse city, home to multiple ethnicities, languages, cultures, and religions. The city is governed by one Municipal Corporation, six Municipal Committees, thirteen Town Committees, and five Tehsil Councils, as outlined in the Punjab Local Government Act of 2019. On the national stage, Muzaffargarh holds significant importance in both provincial and national politics.

== Political Families ==
The Khars, Nawabs, Hinjras, Dastis, Qureshis, Jatois, Gurmani، Gopangs, Chandias, Bukharis, Laghari and Sials families are most infuencial on politics of Muzaffargarh.

=== Bukharis ===
- Syeda Zehra Batool
- Syed Basit Sultan Bukhari
- Syed Haroon Ahmed Sultan Bokhari
- Muhammad Raza Hussain Bukhari

=== Chandias ===
- Azhar Abbas Chandia
- Muhammad Ajmal Khan Chandia

=== Dastis ===
Dasti is a Baloch tribe. People of this tribe also found in Muzaffargarh along with Punjab, Pakistan and Sindh.

- Abdul Hamid Khan Dasti
- Amjad Hameed Khan Dasti
- Tehmina Dasti daughter of Sardar Amjad Dasti
- Abdul Hayi Dasti
- Jamshed Dasti

=== Gopangs ===
- Sardar Aamir Talal Khan Gopang

=== Gurmanis ===
- Mushtaq Ahmed Gurmani
- Muhammad Zeeshan Gurmani

=== Hanjras ===
- Malik Sultan Mehmood Hanjra
- Malik Ghulam Qasim Hanjra

=== Jatois ===
- Abdul Qayyum Khan Jatoi

=== Khars ===
Khar is a sub-clan of the Kharal tribe. People of this tribe also found in Muzaffargarh along with Punjab and Sindh province.

- Ghulam Murtaza Raheem Khar
- Ghulam Mustafa Khar, Former Governor of Punjab and former Chief Minister of Punjab
- Ghulam Noor Rabbani Khar, Former Member of National Assembly of Pakistan
- Hina Rabbani Khar, Daughter of Ghulam Noor Rabbani Khar, Former Minister of State for Foreign Affairs
- Malik Ghulam Raza Rabbani Khar
- Malik Ghulam Arbi Khar, former Member of National Assembly of Pakistan
- Safina Saima Khar, Wife of Malik Ghulam Arbi Khar

=== Lagharis ===
- Khurrum Sohail Khan Laghari

=== Nawabs ===
Nawabzada Nasrullah Khan was prominent political figure in Pakistan and head of Nawab family. Following member of Nawab family are / were active in politics.

- Nawabzada Nasrullah Khan
- Nawabzada Mansoor Ahmed Khan
- Nawabzada Iftikhar Ahmed Khan Babar

=== Qureshi ===
- Mian Alamdar Abbas Qureshi
- Mohsin Ali Qureshi
- Muhammad Imran Qureshi
- Shabbir Ali Qureshi

=== Sials ===
- Mehr Irshad Ahmed Sial

== 2013 General Elections ==
=== Members of the 1National Assembly (2013-2018) ===
Constituency	Political party	Member	Assumed office	Ref.
NA-176 (Muzaffargarh-I)	Pakistan Muslim League (N)	Sultan Mehmood	1 June 2013	
NA-177 (Muzaffargarh-II)	Pakistan Peoples Party	Ghulam Noor Rabbani Khar Was elected in by-election after seat become vacant.	16 September 2013	
NA-178 (Muzaffargarh-III)	Independent	Jamshed Dasti	3 June 2013	
NA-179 (Muzaffargarh-IV)				
NA-180 (Muzaffargarh-V)	Pakistan Muslim League (N)	Sardar Ashiq Hussain	1 June 2013	

=== Members of the Provincial Assembly of the Punjab (2013-2018) ===
Constituency	Constituency name	Member	Political party
PP-251	PP-251 (Muzaffargarh-I)	Malik Ahmad Yar Hunjra	Pakistan Muslim League (N)
PP-252	PP-252 (Muzaffargarh-II)	Muhammad Zeeshan Gurmani	Pakistan Muslim League (N)
PP-253	PP-253 (Muzaffargarh-III)	Ghulam Murtaza Raheem Khar	Pakistan Muslim League (N)
PP-254	PP-254 (Muzaffargarh-IV)	Hammad Nawaz Khan	Pakistan Muslim League (N)
PP-255	PP-255 (Muzaffargarh-V)	Mian Alamdar Abbas Qureshi	Pakistan Muslim League (N)
PP-256	PP-256 (Muzaffargarh-VI)	Muhammad Imran Qureshi	Pakistan Muslim League (N)
PP-257	PP-257 (Muzaffargarh-VII)	Malik Ahmad Karim Qaswar Langrial	Pakistan Muslim League (N)
PP-258	PP-258 (Muzaffargarh-VIII)	Syed Haroon Ahmed Sultan Bokhari	Pakistan Muslim League (N)
PP-259	PP-259 (Muzaffargarh-IX)	None	
PP-260	PP-260 (Muzaffargarh-X)	Syed Muhammad Sibtain Raza	Pakistan Muslim League (N)
PP-261	PP-261 (Muzaffargarh-XI)	Sardar Aamir Talal Khan Gopang	Pakistan Muslim League (N)

== 2018 General Elections ==
=== Members of the National Assembly (2018-2023) ===
Constituency	Political party	Member	Assumed office	Ref.
NA-181 (Muzaffargarh-I)	Pakistan Tehreek-e-Insaf	Muhammad Shabir Ali	13 August 2018	
NA-182 (Muzaffargarh-II)	Pakistan Peoples Party	Mehr Irshad Ahmed Sial	13 August 2018	
NA-183 (Muzaffargarh-III)	Pakistan Peoples Party	Malik Ghulam Raza Rabbani Khar	13 August 2018	
NA-184 (Muzaffargarh-IV)	Pakistan Peoples Party	Iftikhar Ahmed Khan Babar	13 August 2018	
NA-185 (Muzaffargarh-V)	Pakistan Tehreek-e-Insaf	Syed Basit Sultan Bukhari	13 August 2018	
NA-186 (Muzaffargarh-VI)	Pakistan Tehreek-e-Insaf	Sardar Aamir Talal Khan Gopang	13 August 2018	

=== Members of the Provincial Assembly of the Punjab (2018-2023) ===
Constituency No.	Constituency name	Party	Member	Assumed office
268	Muzaffargarh-I	Pakistan Muslim League (N)	Malik Ghulam Qasim Hanjra	15 August 2018
269	Muzaffargarh-II	Pakistan Muslim League (N)	Azhar Abbas Chandia	15 August 2018
270	Muzaffargarh-III	Pakistan Tehreek-e-Insaf	Abdul Hayi Dasti	15 August 2018
271	Muzaffargarh-IV	Pakistan Tehreek-e-Insaf	Nawabzada Mansoor Ahmed Khan	15 August 2018
272	Muzaffargarh-V	Pakistan Tehreek-e-Insaf	Zehra Batool	24 October 2018
273	Muzaffargarh-VI	Pakistan Tehreek-e-Insaf	Syed Muhammad Sibtain Raza	15 August 2018
274	Muzaffargarh-VII	Pakistan Tehreek-e-Insaf	Muhammad Raza Hussain Bukhari	15 August 2018
275	Muzaffargarh-VIII	Pakistan Tehreek-e-Insaf	Khurrum Sohail Khan Laghari	15 August 2018
276	Muzaffargarh-IX	Pakistan Tehreek-e-Insaf	Muhammad Aoon Hamid	15 August 2018
277	Muzaffargarh-X	Pakistan Tehreek-e-Insaf	Mian Alamdar Abbas Qureshi	15 August 2018
278	Muzaffargarh-XI	Pakistan Tehreek-e-Insaf	Niaz Hussain Khan	15 August 2018
279	Muzaffargarh-XII	Pakistan Tehreek-e-Insaf	Muhammad Ashraf Khan Rind	15 August 2018

== 2024 General Elections ==
=== Members of the National Assembly (2024-2029) ===
Constituency	Political party	Member	Assumed office	Ref.
NA-175 Muzaffargarh-I	Independent	Jamshed Dasti		
NA-176 Muzaffargarh-II		Iftikhar Ahmed Khan Babar		
NA-177 Muzaffargarh-III				
NA-178 Muzaffargarh-IV	PML(N)	Sardar Aamir Talal Khan Gopang		

=== Members of the Provincial Assembly of the Punjab (2024-2029) ===
Constituency No.	Constituency name	Party	Member	Assumed office
268	Muzaffargarh-I	Pakistan Muslim League (N)	Muhammad Ajmal Khan Chandia	
269	PP-269 Muzaffargarh-II	Pakistan Muslim League (N)	Mian Alamdar Abbas Qureshi	
270	Muzaffargarh-III	Ind	Zahid Ismail Bhutta	
271	Muzaffargarh-IV	Pakistan Muslim League (N)	Aon Hameed Dogar	
272	Muzaffargarh-V	Ind	Rana Manan Sajid	
273	Muzaffargarh-VI	Ind	Daud Khan Jatoi	
274	Muzaffargarh-VII	Pakistan Muslim League (N)	Sibtain Raza	
275	Muzaffargarh-VIII	Pakistan Muslim League (N)	Nawab Khan Gopang	

== List of politicians ==
- Abdul Hamid Khan Dasti
- Abdul Hayi Dasti
- Abdul Qayyum Khan Jatoi
- Amjad Hameed Khan Dasti
- Azhar Abbas Chandia
- Ghulam Murtaza Raheem Khar
- Ghulam Mustafa Khar, former Governor of Punjab and former Chief Minister of Punjab
- Ghulam Noor Rabbani Khar, politician
- Hammad Nawaz Khan
- Hina Rabbani Khar, former Foreign Minister and the first female foreign minister
- Nawabzada Iftikhar Ahmed Khan Babar - PPPP MNA from NA-184 Muzaffargarh-IV
- Jamshed Dasti founder Awami Raj Party
- Khurrum Sohail Khan Laghari
- Liaqat Baloch
- Mian Imtiaz Aleem Qureshi Hashmi
- Muhammad Imran Qureshi Hashmi
- Mian Muzaffar Mahdi Qureshi Hashmi (MLA)Mian Muzaffar Mehdi Qureshi Hashmi (MLA)
- Mian Alamdar Abbas Qureshi
- Malik Ahmad Karim Qaswar Langrial
- Malik Ghulam Arbi Khar
- Malik Ghulam Qasim Hanjra
- Malik Ghulam Raza Rabbani Khar
- Mehr Irshad Ahmed Sial
- Muhammad Ajmal Khan Chandia
- Muhammad Aoon Hamid
- Muhammad Ashraf Khan Rind
- Muhammad Raza Hussain Bukhari
- Mohsin Ali Qureshi
- Mushtaq Ahmed Gurmani
- Niaz Hussain Khan
- Nawabzada Mansoor Ahmed Khan
- Nawabzada Nasrullah Khan, A prominent political figure in Pakistan
- Rana Muhammad Afzal
- Sardar Abad Dogar, Ex Tehsil Nazim
- Shabbir Ali Qureshi
- Safina Saima Khar
- Sardar Ashiq Hussain, politician
- Sardar Aamir Talal Khan Gopang
- Sultan Mehmood, politician
- Syed Basit Sultan Bukhari
- Syed Muhammad Sibtain Raza
- Tehmina Dasti
- Zehra Batool

== Constituencies of Muzaffargarh ==
=== Provincial Assembly ===
==== General elections 2008 and 2013 ====
- PP-251 (Muzaffargarh-I)
- PP-252 (Muzaffargarh-II)
- PP-253 (Muzaffargarh-III)
- PP-254 (Muzaffargarh-IV)
- PP-255 (Muzaffargarh-V)
- PP-256 (Muzaffargarh-VI)
- PP-257 (Muzaffargarh-VII)
- PP-258 (Muzaffargarh-VIII)
- PP-259 (Muzaffargarh-IX)
- PP-260 (Muzaffargarh-X)
- PP-261 (Muzaffargarh-XI)

==== General elections 2018 ====
- Constituency PP-268 (Muzaffargarh-I)
- Constituency PP-269 (Muzaffargarh-II)
- Constituency PP-270 (Muzaffargarh-III)
- Constituency PP-271 (Muzaffargarh-IV)
- Constituency PP-272 (Muzaffargarh-V)
- Constituency PP-273 (Muzaffargarh-VI)
- Constituency PP-274 (Muzaffargarh-VII)
- Constituency PP-275 (Muzaffargarh-VIII)
- Constituency PP-276 (Muzaffargarh-IX)
- Constituency PP-277 (Muzaffargarh-X)
- Constituency PP-278 (Muzaffargarh-XI)
- Constituency PP-279 (Muzaffargarh-XII)

=== National Assembly ===
==== 3RD NATIONAL ASSEMBLY OF PAKISTANFROM 1962-1964 ====
- NW-59 (Muzaffargarh-cum-D.G. Khan) - Mr. Ghulam Mustafa
- NW-58 (MuzaffargarhI) - Mr. Nasrullah KhanKhangarh, The. And Distt.

==== General Election 2018 ====
- NA-176 (Muzaffargarh-I)
- NA-177 (Muzaffargarh-II)
- NA-178 (Muzaffargarh-III)
- NA-181 (Muzaffargarh-I)
- NA-182 (Muzaffargarh-II)
- NA-183 (Muzaffargarh-III)
- NA-184 (Muzaffargarh-IV)
- NA-185 (Muzaffargarh-V)
- NA-186 (Muzaffargarh-VI)

== See also ==
- List of Pakistani political families
