= List of people from Muzaffargarh =

This is a list of notable people from Muzaffargarh city and Muzaffargarh District.

== Scholars ==
- Uday Bhanu Hans, State poet of Haryana
- Fazal Ali Qureshi
- Hafiz Riaz Hussain Najafi
- Syed Safdar Hussain Najafi

== Artist ==
- Pathanay Khan, Singer
- Tauqeer Nasir, Actor

== Sports ==
- Azhar Hussain, wrestler
- Milkha Singh, Indian track and field sprinter

== Rulers ==
- Nawab Muzaffar Khan, founder of Muzaffargarh
- Tahir Khan Nahar Chief of vast terrioty at Seet pur, Muzaffargarh,

== Politicians ==
- Abdul Hamid Khan Dasti
- Abdul Qayyum Khan Jatoi
- Amjad Hameed Khan Dasti
- Ghulam Murtaza Raheem Khar
- Ghulam Mustafa Khar, former Governor of Punjab and former Chief Minister of Punjab
- Ghulam Noor Rabbani Khar, politician
- Hammad Nawaz Khan
- Hina Rabbani Khar, former Foreign Minister and the first female foreign minister
- Nawabzada Iftakhar Ahmed Khan Babar- PPPP MNA from NA-184 Muzaffargarh-IV
- Jamshed Dasti, politician
- Liaqat Baloch, politician
- Malik Ahmad Karim Qaswar Langrial
- Mohsin Ali Qureshi
- Mushtaq Ahmed Gurmani, former governor of West Pakistan
- Nawabzada Nasrullah Khan, A prominent political figure in Pakistan
- Shabbir Ali Qureshi
- Safina Saima Khar
- Sardar Ashiq Hussain, politician
- Sultan Mehmood, politician
- Tehmina Dasti

=== Members of the 15th National Assembly of Pakistan ===
- Muhammad Shabbir Ali - PTI MNA from NA-181 Muzaffargarh-I
- Mahar Irshad Ahmad Khan - PPPP MNA from NA-182 Muzaffargarh-II
- Malik Ghulam Raza Rabbani Khar PPPP MNA from NA-183 Muzaffargarh-III
- Sardar Aamir Talal Khan Gopang - PTI MNA From NA-186 Muzaffargarh-VI
- Syed Basit Sultan Bukhari - PTI MNA from NA-185 Muzaffargarh-V

=== Members of the 17th Provincial Assembly of the Punjab ===
- Malik Ghulam Qasim Hanjra - PMLN - 268 - Muzaffargarh-I
- Azhar Abbas Chandia - PMLN - 269 - Muzaffargarh-II
- Abdul Hayi Dasti - PTI - 270 - Muzaffargarh-III
- Nawabzada Mansoor Ahmed Khan - PTI - 271 - Muzaffargarh-IV
- Zehra Batool - PTI - 272 - Muzaffargarh-V
- Syed Muhammad Sibtain Raza - PTI- 273 - Muzaffargarh-VI
- Muhammad Raza Hussain Bukhari - PTI - 274 - Muzaffargarh-VII
- Khurrum Sohail Khan Laghari - PTI - 275 - Muzaffargarh-VIII
- Muhammad Aoon Hamid - PTI - 276 - Muzaffargarh-IX
- Mian Alamdar Abbas Qureshi - PTI - 277 - Muzaffargarh-X
- Niaz Hussain Khan - PTI - 278 - Muzaffargarh-XI
- Muhammad Ashraf Khan Rind - PTI - 279 - Muzaffargarh-XII

== Others ==
- Sardar Kaure Khan Jatoi, leading personality for his social services
- Dewan Prem Chand, Indian Army officer
- Afrasiab Mehdi Hashmi, Pakistani diplomat and author
- Mukhtar Mai, human rights activist
- Mahendra Lal Wadhwa, Indian freedom fighter
- Zohra Shah - killed for mistakenly releasing her masters’ parrots.
