= Dera Ghazi Khan Division =

Coordinates: 30°28′N 70°24′E

Dera Ghazi Khan Division ڈیرہ غازی خان ڈویژن
- Division
- Country: Pakistan
- Province: (Punjab, Pakistan) Punjab
- Capital: Dera Ghazi Khan
- Established: 1st July 1982

Area
  - Division: 38,778 km^{2} (14,972 sq mi)

Population (2023)
  - Division: 12,892,465
  - Density: 332.47/km^{2} (861.1/sq mi)
  - Urban: 2,771,711 (21.50%)
  - Rural: 10,120,754

Literacy
  - Literacy rate: Total: (48.00%); Male: (56.48%); Female: (39.20%)
- Website: dgkhandivision.punjab.gov.pk

Dera Ghazi Khan Division is an administrative division of the Punjab Province, Pakistan. The division was established in 1982.

== History ==
During British rule, All the districts that later formed Dera Ghazi Khan Division, collectively formed a district of Multan Division. Dera Ghazi Khan was made into a separate division in 1982. The division system was abolished in 2000 but restored in 2008 after the restoration of democracy in the country.

== List of the Districts ==
District	Capital	Area (km²)	Pop. (2023)	Density (ppl/km²) (2023)	Lit. rate (2023)
Taunsa	Taunsa	8,108	1,045,460	240	...
Kot Addu	Kot Addu	3,471	1,486,758	390	...
Layyah	Layyah	6,289	2,102,386	334.5	61.83%
Dera Ghazi Khan	Dera Ghazi Khan	3,814	3,393,705	285.8	46.78%
Muzaffargarh	Muzaffargarh	4,778	5,015,325	607.5	47.99%
Rajanpur	Rajanpur	12,319	2,381,049	193.3	36.09%

== List of the Tehsils ==
Tehsil	Area (km²)	Pop. (2023)	Density (ppl/km²) (2023)	Lit. rate (2023)	Districts
Dera Ghazi Khan	2,012	1,443,409	717.40	47.25%	Dera Ghazi Khan District
Kot Chutta	1,802	904,836	502.13	38.61%	Dera Ghazi Khan District
Muhammadpur	...	...	...	...	Jampur District
Jampur	2,322	1,012,039	435.85	38.07%	Jampur District
Dajal	...	...	...	...	Jampur District
Jampur Tribal Area	...	...	...	...	Jampur District
Chowk Sarwar Shaheed	1,785	414,578	232.26	55.50%	Kot Addu District
Kot Addu	1,686	1,072,180	635.93	58.19%	Kot Addu District
Karor Lal Esan	1,823	684,729	375.61	62.43%	Layyah District
Chaubara	2,754	299,082	108.60	58.42%	Layyah District
Layyah	1,712	1,118,575	653.37	62.34%	Layyah District
Jatoi	1,010	862,046	853.51	40.67%	Muzaffargarh District
Alipur	1,391	760,526	546.75	39.15%	Muzaffargarh District
Muzaffargarh	2,377	1,905,995	801.85	46.84%	Muzaffargarh District
Rojhan	2,905	474,077	163.19	20.98%	Rajanpur District
Rajanpur	2,078	853,192	410.58	41.38%	Rajanpur District
De-Excluded Area Rajanpur	5,013	41,741	113.13	8.6%	Rajanpur District
Koh-e-Suleman	5,339	248,683	46.58	36.04%	Taunsa District
Taunsa	2,769	796,777	287.75	57.96%	Taunsa District
Vehowa	...	...	...	...	Taunsa District

== Demographics ==
Historical population
Year	Pop.	±% p.a.
1951	N/A	—
1961	N/A	—
1972	N/A	—
1981	N/A	—
1998	6,503,590	—
2017	11,014,398	+2.81%
2023	12,892,465	+2.66%

=== Population ===
The population of Dera Ghazi Khan division was 12,892,465 in 2023 census which was roughly equal to the country of Bolivia or the US state of Illinois.

== Constituencies ==
Provincial Assembly Constituency	National Assembly Constituency	District
PP-268 Muzaffargarh-I	NA-175 Muzaffargarh-I	Muzaffargarh
PP-269 Muzaffargarh-II	NA-175 Muzaffargarh-I	Muzaffargarh
PP-270 Muzaffargarh-III	NA-176 Muzaffargarh-II	Muzaffargarh
PP-271 Muzaffargarh-IV	NA-176 Muzaffargarh-II	Muzaffargarh
PP-272 Muzaffargarh-V	NA-177 Muzaffargarh-III	Muzaffargarh
PP-273 Muzaffargarh-VI	NA-177 Muzaffargarh-III	Muzaffargarh
PP-274 Muzaffargarh-VII	NA-178 Muzaffargarh-IV	Muzaffargarh
PP-275 Muzaffargarh-VIII	NA-178 Muzaffargarh-IV	Muzaffargarh
PP-276 Kot Addu-I	NA-179 Kot Addu-I	Kot Addu
PP-278 Kot Addu-III	NA-179 Kot Addu-I	Kot Addu
PP-277 Kot Addu-II	NA-180 Kot Addu-II	Kot Addu
PP-279 Layyah-I	NA-181 Layyah-I	Layyah
PP-280 Layyah-II	NA-181 Layyah-I	Layyah
PP-281 Layyah-III	NA-181 Layyah-I	Layyah
PP-282 Layyah-IV	NA-182 Layyah-II	Layyah
PP-283 Layyah-V	NA-182 Layyah-II	Layyah
PP-284 Taunsa-I	NA-183 Taunsa	Taunsa
PP-285 Taunsa-II	NA-183 Taunsa	Taunsa
PP-286 Dera Ghazi Khan-I	NA-184 Dera Ghazi Khan-I	Dera Ghazi Khan
PP-287 Dera Ghazi Khan-II	NA-184 Dera Ghazi Khan-I	Dera Ghazi Khan
PP-288 Dera Ghazi Khan-III	NA-185 Dera Ghazi Khan-II	Dera Ghazi Khan
PP-289 Dera Ghazi Khan-IV	NA-185 Dera Ghazi Khan-II	Dera Ghazi Khan
PP-290 Dera Ghazi Khan-V	NA-186 Dera Ghazi Khan-III	Dera Ghazi Khan
PP-291 Dera Ghazi Khan-VI	NA-186 Dera Ghazi Khan-III	Dera Ghazi Khan
PP-292 Rajanpur-I	NA-187 Rajanpur-I	Rajanpur
PP-293 Rajanpur-II	NA-187 Rajanpur-I	Rajanpur
PP-294 Rajanpur-III	NA-188 Rajanpur-II	Rajanpur
PP-295 Rajanpur-IV	NA-188 Rajanpur-II	Rajanpur
PP-296 Rajanpur-V	NA-189 Rajanpur-III	Rajanpur
PP-297 Rajanpur-VI	NA-189 Rajanpur-III	Rajanpur

== See also ==
- Dera Ghazi Khan
- Louis Dane - In 1876 he was posted to the Punjab as assistant commissioner in Dera Ghazi Khan
- Mustafa Zaidi - served as assistant commissioner of Dera Ghazi Khan
- Andrew Jukes (missionary) He was sent to Baloch mission at Dera Ghazi Khan, where he stayed until 1906
- Robert Groves Sandeman - in 1866 he was appointed district officer of Dera Ghazi Khan
