= Muhammad Ajmal Khan Chandia =

Pakistani politician (born 1981)

Member of the Provincial Assembly of the Punjab
- Incumbent
- Assumed office 24 February 2024
- Constituency: PP-268 Muzaffargarh-I

Personal details
- Born: January 1, 1981 (age 45) Muzaffargarh, Punjab, Pakistan
- Party: PMLN (2024-present)
- Other political affiliations: Awami Raj Party (2018-2024)

Muhammad Ajmal Khan Chandia is a Pakistani politician who is a member of the Provincial Assembly of the Punjabelected in 2024 Pakistani general election from PP-268 Muzaffargarh-I. He is also a cricket player.

== Political career ==
Ajmal belongs to a political family. His brother Muhammad Akram Khan Chandia was Chairman Municipal Committee Muzaffargarh.

=== 2018 election ===
In the 2018 Pakistani general election he contested as a member of the Awami Raj Party and lost.

=== 2024 election ===
in the 2024 Pakistani general election he stood as a candidate from the Pakistan Muslim League (N) and won.
