= Muhammad Ahsan Ali =

Pakistani politician

Muhammad Ahsan Ali Qureshi

Member of the Provincial Assembly of the Punjab
- Incumbent
- Assumed office 24 February 2024
- President: Asif Ali Zardari
- Prime Minister: Shehbaz Sharif
- Constituency: PP-278 Kot Addu-III

Personal details
- Born: Kot Addu, Pakistan
- Party: PTI (2024-present)
- Parent: Mohsin Ali Qureshi (father)

Muhammad Ahsan Ali is a Pakistani politician who has been a Member of the Provincial Assembly of the Punjab since 2024.

== Political career ==
He was elected to the Provincial Assembly of the Punjab as a Pakistan Tehreek-e-Insaf-backed independent candidate from constituency PP-278 Kot Addu-III in the 2024 Pakistani general election.
