= NA-178 Muzaffargarh-IV =

Constituency of the National Assembly of Pakistan

- Constituency for the National Assembly of Pakistan
- Region: Jatoi Tehsil (partly) and Alipur Tehsil of Muzaffargarh District
- Electorate: 428,612

Current constituency
- Party: Pakistan Muslim League (N)
- Member: Sardar Aamir Talal Khan Gopang
- Created from: NA-180 Muzaffargarh-V

NA-178 Muzaffargarh-IV (این اے-178، مُظفّرگڑھ-4) is a constituency for the National Assembly of Pakistan.

== Election 2002 ==
General elections were held on 10 October 2002. Abdul Qayyum Khan Jatoi of PPP won by 69,653 votes.

General election 2002: NA-180 Muzaffargarh-V
Party	Candidate	Votes	%	±%
PPP	Abdul Qayyum Khan Jatoi	69,653	51.11	
PML(Q)	Sardar Ashiq Hussain Khan Gopang	65,871	48.34	
MMA	Muhammad Shafi Khan	746	0.55	
Turnout		138,968	53.98	
Total valid votes		136,270	98.06	
Rejected ballots		2,698	1.94	
Majority		3,782	2.77	
Registered electors		257,432		

== Election 2008 ==
General elections were held on 18 February 2008. Abdul Qayyum Khan Jatoi of PPP won by 68,270 votes.

General election 2008: NA-180 Muzaffargarh-V
Party	Candidate	Votes	%	±%
PPP	Abdul Qayyum Khan Jatoi	68,270	50.50	
PML(Q)	Sardar Ashiq Hussain Khan Gopang	63,144	46.71	
Others	Others (six candidates)	4,498	2.79	
Turnout		139,843	54.32	
Total valid votes		135,912	97.19	
Rejected ballots		3,931	2.81	
Majority		5,126	3.79	
Registered electors		257,481		
PPP hold				

== Election 2013 ==
General elections were held on 11 May 2013. Sardar Aashiq Khan Gopang of Independent won by 72,044 votes and became the member of National Assembly.

General election 2013: NA-180 Muzaffargarh-V
Party	Candidate	Votes	%	±%
Independent	Sardar Ashiq Hussain Khan Gopang	72,044	39.54	
PML(N)	Syed Muhammad Abdullah Shah	57,158	31.37	
PPP	Abdul Qayyum Khan Jatoi	41,548	22.80	
Others	Others (nine candidates)	11,546	6.29	
Turnout		187,918	63.45	
Total valid votes		182,206	96.96	
Rejected ballots		5,712	3.04	
Majority		14,886	8.17	
Registered electors		296,167		
Independent gain from PPP				

== Election 2018 ==
General elections were held on 25 July 2018. Pakistan Tehreek-e-Insaf candidate Amir Talal Gopang elected member national assembly from NA-186 Muzaffargarh-VI

General election 2018: NA-186 Muzaffargarh-VI
Party	Candidate	Votes	%	±%
PTI	Sardar Aamir Talal Khan Gopang	63,564	33.16	
PPP	Daud Khan Jatoi	53,690	28.00	
Independent	Sardar Khizir Hayat	44,723	23.33	
PML(N)	Syed Haroon Ahmed Sultan Bokhari	19,333	10.08	
TLP	Muhammad Shafi Khan	9,680	5.05	
Jamiat Ulema-e-Pakistan	Ghous Bakhsh Faridi	727	0.38	
Turnout		198,484	60.54	
Total valid votes		191,717	96.59	
Rejected ballots		6,767	3.41	
Majority		9,866	5.15	
Registered electors		327,873		

== Election 2024 ==
General elections were held on 8 February 2024. Sardar Aamir Talal Khan Gopang won the election with 114,678 votes.

General election 2024: NA-178 Muzaffargarh-IV
Party	Candidate	Votes	%	±%
PML(N)	Sardar Aamir Talal Khan Gopang	114,678	50.94	▲40.86
PTI	Abdul Qayyum Khan Jatoi (Note: Filed nomination papers as PTI candidate but ECP allowed him to run as an Independent)	88,404	39.27	▲6.11
Others	Others (eight candidates)	22,044	9.79	
Turnout		233,059	54.38	▼6.16
Total valid votes		225,126	96.70	
Rejected ballots		7,933	3.30	
Majority		26,274	11.67	
Registered electors		428,612		
PML(N) gain from PTI				

== See also ==
- NA-177 Muzaffargarh-III
- NA-179 Kot Addu-I
