= Daud Khan Jatoi =

Pakistani politician

Sardar Dawood Khan Jatoi

Member of the Provincial Assembly of the Punjab
- Incumbent
- Assumed office 24 February 2024
- Constituency: PP-273 Muzaffargarh-VI

Personal details
- Born: Muzaffargarh, Punjab, Pakistan
- Party: PTI (2024-present)
- Parent: Abdul Qayyum Khan Jatoi (father)

Sardar Dawood Khan Jatoi is a Pakistani politician who is a member of the Provincial Assembly of the Punjab elected in the 2024 Punjab provincial election from PP-270 Muzaffargarh-III. He is the Son of Ex federal minister Sardar Abdul Qayyum jatoi. He first contested in 2018 for the Seat of National assembly but was unsuccessful.

== Political career ==
=== 2024 election ===
He contested the 2024 Pakistani general election as an independent candidate supported by the PTI and was elected.
