= Sardar Ashiq Hussain =

Pakistani politician

Sardar Ashiq Hussain Gopang (Urdu: سردار عاشق حسین گوپانگ) is a Pakistani politician who was a member of the National Assembly of Pakistan, from June 2013 to May 2018. He was a member of the Provincial Assembly of the Punjab from 1985 to 1993 and again from 1997 to 1999. He belongs to Tehsil Ali Pur, District Muzaffar Garh, Punjab. Currently, his son Sardar Amir Talal Khan Gopang is Member of National Assembly of Pakistan from ticket of Pakistan Muslim League (PMLN).

== Political career ==
He was elected to the Provincial Assembly of the Punjab from Constituency PP-194 (Muzaffargarh) in the 1985 Pakistani general election.

He was re-elected to the Provincial Assembly of the Punjab as a candidate of Islami Jamhoori Ittehad (IJI) from Constituency PP-207 (Muzaffargarh-I) in the 1988 Pakistani general election. He received 23,023 votes and defeated Roshan Ali, a candidate of Pakistan Peoples Party (PPP).

He was re-elected to the Provincial Assembly of the Punjab as a candidate of IJI from Constituency PP-207 (Muzaffargarh-I) in the 1990 Pakistani general election. He received 28,499 votes and defeated Haji Rasool Bakhsh, a candidate of Jamiat Ulema-e-Pakistan (Noorani). In the same election, he ran for the seat of the Provincial Assembly of the Punjab as an independent candidate from Constituency PP-208 (Muzaffargarh-II) but was unsuccessful. He received 25,914 votes and lost the seat to Sardar Khan Muhammad Khan Jatoi, a candidate of IJI.

He ran for the seat of the Provincial Assembly of the Punjab as a candidate of IJM from Constituency PP-207 (Muzaffargarh-I) and from Constituency PP-208 (Muzaffargarh-II) in the 1993 Pakistani general election but was unsuccessful. He received 24,776 from Constituency PP-207 (Muzaffargarh-I) and lost the seat to Rasool Baksh Khan Jatoi, a candidate of Pakistan Muslim League (N) (PML-N). He received 3,446 votes from Constituency PP-208 (Muzaffargarh-II) and lost the seat to Sardar Khan Muhammad Khan Jatoi, a candidate of PML-N.

He was re-elected to the Provincial Assembly of the Punjab as a candidate of PML-N from Constituency PP-207 (Muzaffargarh-I) in the 1997 Pakistani general election. He received 38,842 and defeated an independent candidate, Rasool Baksh Khan Jatoi.

He ran for the seat of the National Assembly of Pakistan as a candidate of Pakistan Muslim League (Q) (PML-Q) from Constituency NA-180 (Muzaffargarh-V) in the 2002 Pakistani general election but was unsuccessful. He received 65,871 votes and lost the seat to Abdul Qayyum Khan Jatoi.

He ran for the seat of the National Assembly as a candidate of PML-Q from Constituency NA-180 (Muzaffargarh-V) in the 2008 Pakistani general election but was unsuccessful. He received 63,144 votes and lost the seat to Abdul Qayyum Khan Jatoi. In the same election, he ran for the seat of the Provincial Assembly of the Punjab as an independent candidate from Constituency PP-261 (Muzaffargarh-XI) but was unsuccessful. He received 345 votes and lost the seat to Sardar Aamir Talal Khan Gopang.

He was elected to the National Assembly as an independent candidate from Constituency NA-180 (Muzaffargarh-V) in the 2013 Pakistani general election. He received 72,044 votes and defeated Syed Muhammad Abdullah Shah, a candidate of PML-N. He joined PML-N in May 2013.

In May 2018, he quit PML-N and joined Pakistan Tehreek-e-Insaf (PTI).
