= Union Councils in Muzaffargarh District =

District in Punjab, Pakistan

Muzaffargarh District ضلع مُظفّر گڑھ
- Tehsil
- Country: Pakistan
- Region: (Punjab, Pakistan) Punjab
- District: Muzaffargarh
- Towns: 1
- Union councils: 23

Population (2017)
  - Tehsil: 1,624,472
  - Urban: 239,994
  - Rural: 1,384,478
- Time zone: UTC+5 (PST)
  - Summer (DST): UTC+6 (PDT)

== Union Councils ==
1. AHMAD MOHANA
2. ALLUDAY WALI
3. BASIRA
4. BASTI KHARAK
5. BERAHIM WALI
6. CHAK FARAZI
7. DANREEN
8. GAIRAY WAHIN
9. GANGA
10. GHAZANFAR GARH
11. GULL WALA
12. JAGAT PUR
13. KARAM DAD QURESHI
14. KHANPUR NORTH
15. KHANGARH
16. LUTKERAN
17. M. GARH CITY-1
18. M. GARH CITY-2
19. M. GARH CITY-3
20. M. GARH CITY-4
21. MAHRA EAST
22. MANAK PUR
23. MURAD ABAD
24. NOHAN WALI
25. PATTAL MUNDA
26. RANG PUR
27. ROHILLAN WALI
28. SHAH JAMAL
29. SHARIF CHAJRA
30. TALIRI
31. THATHA QURESHI
32. UMAR PUR SOUTH
33. USMAN KORIA
34. UTRA SANDILA
35. WAN PITAFI
36. Hassan pur tarund
