= Moazam Ali Khan Jatoi =

Pakistani politician

Muhammad Moazam Ali Khan Jatoi

Member of the National Assembly of Pakistan
- Incumbent
- Assumed office 29 February 2024
- Constituency: NA-177 Muzaffargarh-III
- In office 2008–2013
- Constituency: NA-177 (Muzaffargarh-IV)

Member of the Provincial Assembly of the Punjab
- In office 21 July 2022 – 14 January 2023
- Constituency: PP-272 Muzaffargarh-V

Personal details
- Born: 8 October 1981 (age 44)
- Party: PTI (2018-present)
- Other political affiliations: PPP (2008-2013)

Muhammad Moazam Ali Khan Jatoi (Urdu: محمد معظم علی خان جتوئی; born 8 October 1981) is a Pakistani politician who has been a member of the National Assembly of Pakistan since 28 February 2024 and previously served in this position from 2008 to 2013. He had previously been a member of the Provincial Assembly of Punjab from July 2022 till January 2023.

== Early life ==
He was born on 23 August 1996.

== Political career ==
He was elected to the National Assembly of Pakistan from Constituency NA-179 (Muzaffargarh-IV) as a candidate of Pakistan Peoples Party (PPP) in the 2008 Pakistani general election. He was appointed minister of State for food. He received 79,643 votes and defeated Syed Basit Sultan Bukhari. In April 2012, he was inducted into the federal cabinet of Prime Minister Yousaf Raza Gillani and was appointed Minister of State for Food Security and Research. In June 2012, he was inducted into the federal cabinet of Prime Minister Raja Pervaiz Ashraf and was re-appointed Minister of State for National Food Security and Research where he continued to serve until April 2013.

He ran for the seat of the National Assembly from Constituency NA-179 (Muzaffargarh-IV) as a candidate of PPP in the 2013 Pakistani general election but was unsuccessful. He received 73,199 votes and lost the seat to Syed Basit Sultan Bukhari, a candidate of the PML(N).

He ran for the seat of the National Assembly from NA-185 Muzaffargarh-V as a candidate of the Pakistan Tehreek-e-Insaf (PTI) in the 2018 Pakistani general election but was unsuccessful. He received 73,185 votes and lost to Syed Basit Sultan Bukhari, an independent candidate.

He was elected to the Provincial Assembly of Punjab from PP-272 (Muzaffargarh-V) as a candidate of the PTI in the 2022 Punjab provincial by-elections. He received 46,069 votes and defeated Zehra Basit Bukhari, a candidate of the PML(N).

He was elected to the National Assembly from NA-177 Muzaffargarh-III as a PTI-endorsed independent candidate in the 2024 Pakistani general election. He received 114,057 votes and drafted Syeda Shehr Bano Bukhari, a candidate of PML(N).
