= Syed Basit Sultan Bukhari =

Pakistani politician (born 1969)

- سید باسط سلطان بخاری

federal minister for Kashmir affairs
- In office 15 July 2022 – 13 August 2023
- President: Arif Alvi
- Prime Minister: Shehbaz Sharif

Member of the National Assembly of Pakistan
- In office 13 August 2018 – 10 August 2023
- Constituency: NA-185 (Muzaffargarh-V)
- In office 1 June 2013 – April 2018
- Constituency: NA-179 (Muzaffargarh-IV)
- In office 2002–2007
- Constituency: NA-179 (Muzaffargarh-IV)

Member of the Provincial Assembly of the Punjab
- In office December 2010 – march 2013
- Constituency: PP-259 (Muzaffargarh-IX)

Member of the Provincial Assembly of the Punjab
- In office February 20, 1997 – 12 October 1999
- Constituency: PP-259 (Muzaffargarh-IX)

Minister of State for Water Resources
- In office 19 august 2017 – 11 January 2018
- President: Mamnoon Hussain
- Prime Minister: Shahid Khaqan Abbasi

Personal details
- Born: May 28, 1966 (age 60) Muzaffargarh, Punjab, Pakistan
- Party: PMLN (2023-present)
- Other political affiliations: IPP (2022-2023); PTI (2018-2022); PMLN (2013-2018); PPP (2008-2013); PML(Q) (2001-2008); PMLN (1997-1999); PPP (1993-1996)
- Relations: Syed Haroon Ahmed Sultan Bokhari (brother)
- Parent: Zehra Batool (mother)

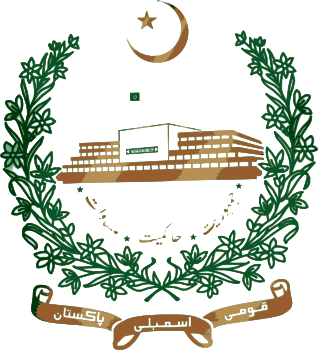
Emblem of National Assembly of Pakistan

Makhdoomzada Syed Basit Sultan Bukhari (Urdu: سید باسط سلطان بخاری; born 28 May 1966) is a Pakistani politician who had been a member of the National Assembly of Pakistan from August 2018 till August 2023 and federal minister . Previously he was a member of the National Assembly from 2002 to 2007 and again from June 2013 to April 2018.

== Early life ==
He was born on 28 May 1966.

== Political career ==
He was elected member provincial assembly as the candidate of PMLN in 1997 general elections Later He was elected to the National Assembly of Pakistan as a candidate of Pakistan Muslim League (Q) (PML-Q) from Constituency NA-179 (Muzaffargarh-IV) in the 2002 Pakistani general election. He received 63,778 votes and defeated Abdul Qayyum Khan Jatoi.

He ran for the seat of the National Assembly as a candidate of PML-Q from Constituency NA-179 (Muzaffargarh-IV) in the 2008 Pakistani general election, but was unsuccessful. He received 60,637 votes and lost the seat to Muhammad Moazam Ali Khan Jatoi. In the same election, he ran for the seat of the Provincial Assembly of the Punjab as an independent candidate from Constituency PP-258 (Muzaffargarh-VIII) but was unsuccessful. He received 1,163 votes and lost the seat to Abdul Qayyum Khan Jatoi. later in 2010 he was elected Member of the Provincial Assembly he received 39,484 votes and defeated sami ullah khan laghari

He was re-elected to the National Assembly as a candidate of Pakistan Muslim League (N) (PML-N) from Constituency NA-179 (Muzaffargarh) in the 2013 Pakistani general election. He received 110,197 votes and defeated Muhammad Moazam Ali Khan Jatoi. later in august 2017 He was elected minister of state for Water Resources

In April 2018, he quit PML-N and resigned from the National Assembly. He joined Pakistan Tehreek-e-Insaf (PTI) in May 2018.

He was re-elected to the National Assembly as an independent candidate from Constituency NA-185 (Muzaffargarh-V) in the 2018 Pakistani general election. Following his successful election, he announced to re-join PTI. Later in July 2022 he was elected federal minister for Kashmir affairs

=== 2002 ===
Basit Bukhari contested the elections on PML-Q ticket and he won the elections and was elected member National Assembly after winning the election

2002 General Election: NA-179 (Muzaffargarh)
Party	Candidate	Votes	%	±%
PML-Q	Basit Bukhari	85,934	64.21	
PPP	Abdul Qayuom Jatoi	38,976	31.08	
Majority		48,000	12.13	
Turnout		160,00	72.40	
PML-Q gain from PPP (politician)				

== Election 2013 ==
General elections were held on 11 May 2013. Syed Basit Sultan Bukhari of PML-N won by 110,197 votes and became the member of National Assembly.

General election 2013: NA-179 Muzaffargarh-IV
Party	Candidate	Votes	%	±%
PML(N)	Makhdoomzada Syed Basit Ahmad Sultan Bokhari	110,197	53.75	
PPP	Muhammad Moazam Ali Khan Jatoi	73,199	35.71	
PTI	Makhdoom Jamil Ahmad Hussain Bokhari	9,476	4.62	
Others	Others (eleven candidates)	12,136	5.92	
Turnout		212,544	62.19	
Total valid votes		205,008	96.45	
Rejected ballots		7,536	3.55	
Majority		36,998	18.04	
Registered electors		341,765		
PML(N) gain from PPP				

== Election 2018 ==
General elections were held on 25 July 2018.

General election 2018: NA-185 Muzaffargarh-V
Party	Candidate	Votes	%	±%
Independent	Syed Basit Sultan Bukhari	94,672	48.11	
PTI	Moazam Ali Khan Jatoi	73,185	37.19	
ARP	Jamshed Dasti	9,319	4.74	
TLP	Muhammad Masood Saeedi	8,285	4.21	
Independent	Rao Atif All Khan	5,574	2.83	
Independent	Sayeda Zahra Basit Bukhari	3,840	1.95	
Independent	Azra Parveen	1,526	0.78	
Independent	Muhammad Zafar Ullah Khan Laghari	396	0.20	
Turnout		204,477	58.23	
Total valid votes		196,797	96.24	
Rejected ballots		7,680	3.76	
Majority		21,487	10.92	
Registered electors		351,181		

=== 2010 ===
Basit Bukhari contested the elections as an independent candidate and he won the elections and was elected member provincial Assembly after winning the election

2010 bye Election: PP-259 (Muzaffargarh)
Party	Candidate	Votes	%	±%
independent	Basit Bukhari	39,484	64.21	
PPP	Sami ullah Laghari	29,560	31.08	
Majority		9,000	12.13	

=== 1997 ===
Basit Bukhari contested the elections on PML-N ticket and he won the elections and was elected member provincial Assembly after winning the election

1997 General Election: PP-259 (Muzaffargarh)
Party	Candidate	Votes	%	±%
Pakistan Muslim league (N)	Basit Bukhari	21,589	11.21	
Pakistan people’s Party	haji iqbal leghari	19,888	10.08	
Majority		2,000	12.13	
Turnout		42,00	72.40	
PML-N gain from PPP (politician)				

== More reading ==
- List of members of the 15th National Assembly of Pakistan
