= NA-178 (Muzaffargarh-III) =

Constituency of the National Assembly of Pakistan

- Former constituency for the National Assembly of Pakistan
- Region: Muzaffargarh District

Former constituency
- Abolished: 2018
- Replaced by: NA-182 (Muzaffargarh-II); NA-184 (Muzaffargarh-IV)

NA-178 (Muzaffargarh-III) (Urdu: این اے-۱۷۸، مُظفّرگڑھ-۳) was a constituency for the National Assembly of Pakistan.

== Area ==
The constituency consisted of following area

- (a)Muzaffargarh Municipal Committee
- (b) Khangarh Town Committee.
- (c) Muzaffargarh Qanungo Halqa excluding the following Patwar Circles:—
  - (i) Rakh Khan Pur
  - (ii) Khan Pur Shumali
- (d) The following Patwar Circles of Muradabad Qanungo Habqa•—
  - (i) Ali Pur Janubi
  - (ii) Khangarh Janubi
  - (iii) Thatha Siyalan
- (e) The following Qanungo Halqa of Muzaffargarh Tehsil
  - (i) Shah Jamal
  - (ii) Meharpur
  - (iii) Khanguh

of Muzaffargarh District.

== Election 2002 ==
General elections were held on 10 Oct 2002. Muhammad Shahid Jamil Qureshi of PML-Q won by 60,386 votes.

General election 2002: NA-178 Muzaffargarh-III
Party	Candidate	Votes	%	±%
PML(Q)	Muhammad Shahid Jamil Qureshi	60,386	48.92	
PDP	Sultan Ahmad Khan	56,728	45.95	
MMA	Mehar Tanveer Ahmad Jangla	2,339	1.90	
Others	Others (seven candidates)	3,998	3.23	
Turnout		127,307	46.48	
Total valid votes		123,451	96.97	
Rejected ballots		3,856	3.03	
Majority		3,658	2.97	
Registered electors		273,899		

== Election 2008 ==
General elections were held on 18 Feb 2008. Jamshed Ahmad Khan Dasti of PPP won by 57,946 votes.

General election 2008: NA-178 Muzaffargarh-III
Party	Candidate	Votes	%	±%
PPP	Jamshaid Ahmad Dasti	57,946	42.44	
PML(Q)	Nawab Zada Iftikhar Ahmad Khan Babar	42,485	31.12	
PDP	Nawabzada Mansoor Ahmad Khan	30,582	22.40	
PML(N)	lhasn Kareem Qureshi	3,089	2.26	
Others	Others (two candidates)	2,434	1.78	
Turnout		140,817	49.66	
Total valid votes		136,536	96.96	
Rejected ballots		4,281	3.04	
Majority		15,461	11.32	
Registered electors		283,548		

== By-Election 2010 ==
By-Election 2010: NA-178 Muzaffargarh-III
Party	Candidate	Votes	%	±%
PPP	Jamshaid Ahmad Dasti	53,817	44.50	
PDP	Nawabzada Iftikhar Ahmad Khan Babar	50,102	41.43	
Independent	Malik Ghulam Mustafa Khar	6,162	5.10	
Independent	Khawaja Taj Rasool Shahjamali	5,186	4.29	
Independent	Sajjad Hussain Qureshi	3,612	2.99	
Others	Others (thirteen candidates)	2,060	1.69	
Turnout		122,161	43.09	
Total valid votes		120,939	99.00	
Rejected ballots		1,222	1.00	
Majority		3,715	3.07	
Registered electors		283,523		

== Election 2013 ==
General elections were held on 11 May 2013. Jamshed Ahmad Khan Dasti an independent candidate won by 79,417 votes and became the member of National Assembly.

General election 2013: NA-178 Muzaffargarh-III
Party	Candidate	Votes	%	±%
Independent	Jamshaid Ahmad Dasti	79,417	37.95	
PML(N)	Muhammad Abad	63,228	30.22	
PTI	Muhammad Sajid Naeem Qureshi	33,212	15.87	
PPP	Nawabzada Iftikhar Ahmad Khan	26,048	12.45	
Others	Others (fifteen candidates)	7,356	3.51	
Turnout		216,214	61.84	
Total valid votes		209,261	96.78	
Rejected ballots		6,953	3.22	
Majority		16,189	7.73	
Registered electors		349,646		
