= Mahendra Lal Wadhwa =

Indian freedom fighter

Mahendra Lal Wadhwa (October 2, 1900 – August 1988) was an Indian freedom fighter from the town of Muzaffargarh. He fought the British Rule in India for an independent country, for which he was subsequently imprisoned many times. He was awarded the Tamrapatra in 1972, an award for outstanding contribution to freedom fighting by the Indian government. After the partition where he lost all his land, he went to live in Rohtak, Haryana and then New Delhi.

Mahendra Lal Wadhwa died in August 1988 in Delhi, leaving behind his wife and children.
