= Khurrum Sohail Khan Laghari =

Pakistani politician

Member of the Provincial Assembly of the Punjab
- In office 15 August 2018 – 14 January 2023
- Constituency: PP-275 Muzaffargarh-VIII

Personal details
- Born: 24 January 1970 (age 56) Muzaffargarh, Punjab, Pakistan
- Party: IPP (2023-present)
- Other political affiliations: PMLN (2022-2023); PTI (2018-2022)

Khurrum Sohail Khan Laghari is a Pakistani politician who had been a member of the Provincial Assembly of the Punjab from August 2018 till January 2023.

== Political career ==
He was elected to the Provincial Assembly of the Punjab as an independent candidate from Constituency PP-275 (Muzaffargarh-VIII) in the 2018 Pakistani general election.

He joined Pakistan Tehreek-e-Insaf (PTI) following his election.

On 11 September 2018, he was inducted into the provincial Punjab cabinet of Chief Minister Usman Buzdar and was appointed special assistant to the Chief Minister on food.
