= Zahid Ismail Bhutta =

Pakistani politician

Member of the Provincial Assembly of the Punjab
- Incumbent
- Assumed office 24 February 2024
- Constituency: PP-270 Muzaffargarh-III

Personal details
- Party: IPP (2024-present)

Zahid Ismail Bhutta is a Pakistani politician who is a member of the Provincial Assembly of the Punjab elected in 2024 Pakistani general election from PP-270 Muzaffargarh-III.

== Political career ==
=== 2024 election ===
In the 2024 Pakistani general election he contested as an independent candidate supported by PTI and won. He got 33,453 votes. Later he joined IPP.
