= Khar (tribe) =

Punjabi Muslim clan in the Kharal tribe

- کھر
- Jāti: Muslim Jat
- Religions: Islam
- Languages: Punjabi
- Country: Pakistan
- Region: Punjab
- Ethnicity: Punjabi
- Related groups: Kharal

The Khar (Punjabi: کھر) is a Punjabi Muslim clan of the larger Kharal tribe primarily found in southern Punjab, particularly in the Muzaffargarh District.

== Etymology ==
Multiple oral traditions and legends exist regarding how the name Kharal was shortened to Khar over time.

== See also ==
- Kharal
- Muzaffargarh District
- Punjabi people
- Jat Muslim
