= Mian Alamdar Abbas Qureshi =

Pakistani politician

Member of the Provincial Assembly of the Punjab
- Incumbent
- Assumed office 18 February 2024
- Constituency: PP-269 Muzaffargarh-II
- In office 15 August 2018 – 14 January 2023
- Constituency: PP-277 Muzaffargarh-X
- In office 29 May 2013 – 31 May 2018
- Constituency: PP-255 Muzaffargarh-V

Personal details
- Born: 1 January 1963 (age 63) Muzaffargarh, Punjab, Pakistan
- Party: PPP (2023-present)
- Other political affiliations: PTI (2018-2023); PMLN (2013-2018)

Mian Alamdar Abbas Qureshi (born 1 January 1963) is a Pakistani politician who is a sitting member of Punjab Assembly since February 2024. Previously he was a member of the Provincial Assembly of the Punjab from August 2013 to 2018 and 2018 to 2023.

== Early life and education ==
He was born on 1 January 1963 in Muzaffargarh.

He has the degree of Master of Arts which he obtained in 1984 from Forman Christian College.

== Political career ==
He was elected to the Provincial Assembly of the Punjab as an independent candidate from Constituency PP-255 (Muzaffargarh-V) in the 2013 Pakistani general election. He joined Pakistan Muslim League (N) in May 2013.

He was re-elected to Provincial Assembly of the Punjab as an independent candidate from Constituency PP-277 (Muzaffargarh-X) in the 2018 Pakistani general election.

In August 2018, he joined Pakistan Tehreek-e-Insaf (PTI).

He was re-elected to the Provincial Assembly of the Punjab as a candidate of PPP from Constituency PP-269 Muzaffargarh-II in the 2024 Pakistani general election. However later he resigned on 22 March 2024.
