= PP-277 Kot Addu-II =

Constituency of the Punjabi Provincial Legislature, Pakistan

- Constituency for the Provincial Assembly of Punjab
- Region: Kot Addu Tehsil (partly) including Sinawan town of Kot Addu District

Current constituency
- Created from: PP-252 Muzaffargarh-II (2002-2018); PP-278 Muzaffargarh-XI (2018-2023)

PP-277 Kot Addu-II (پی پی-277، کوٹ ادو-2) is a Constituency of Provincial Assembly of Punjab.

== General elections 2024 ==
Provincial election 2024: PP-277 Kot Addu-II
| Party | Candidate | Votes | % | ±% |
|---|---|---|---|---|
| Independent | Nadia Khar (Note: Filed nomination papers as PTI candidate but ECP allowed him to run as an Independent) | 56,354 | 42.16 | |
| Independent | Muhammad Zeeshan Gurmani | 47,363 | 35.44 | |
| IPP | Niaz Hussain Khan | 14,603 | 10.93 | |
| JUI (F) | Taj Muhammad | 3,928 | 2.94 | |
| TLP | Muhammad Asif | 2,687 | 2.01 | |
| Independent | Muhammad Uzair Hussain | 2,532 | 1.89 | |
| Others | Others (twenty six candidates) | 6,193 | 4.63 | |
| Turnout | | 137,704 | 51.60 | |
| Total valid votes | | 133,660 | 97.06 | |
| Rejected ballots | | 4,044 | 2.94 | |
| Majority | | 8,991 | 6.72 | |
| Registered electors | | 266,874 | | |
| hold | | | | |

== General elections 2018 ==
Provincial election 2018: PP-278 Muzaffargarh-XI
| Party | Candidate | Votes | % | ±% |
|---|---|---|---|---|
| PTI | Niaz Hussain Khan | 28,341 | 28.10 | |
| Independent | Muhammad Zeeshan Gurmani | 23,040 | 22.84 | |
| PPP | Malik Bilal Ahmad Khar | 15,466 | 15.33 | |
| Independent | Khalil Ur Rehman Khan Gurmani | 11,444 | 11.35 | |
| Independent | Muhammad Akmal Khan Rao | 11,344 | 11.25 | |
| TLP | Malik Abdul Ahad | 6,097 | 6.04 | |
| ARP | Mian Amir Sultan Goraya | 1,487 | 1.47 | |
| Others | Others (eight candidates) | 3,657 | 3.62 | |
| Turnout | | 104,083 | 61.95 | |
| Total valid votes | | 100,876 | 96.92 | |
| Rejected ballots | | 3,207 | 3.08 | |
| Majority | | 5,301 | 5.26 | |
| Registered electors | | 168,014 | | |

== General elections 2013 ==
Provincial election 2013: PP-252 Muzaffargarh-II
| Party | Candidate | Votes | % | ±% |
|---|---|---|---|---|
| Independent | Muhammad Zishan Gurmani | 20,408 | 19.26 | |
| PPP | Malik Bilal Ahmad Khar | 17,475 | 16.49 | |
| Independent | Niaz Hussain Khan Gishkoory | 16,815 | 15.87 | |
| Independent | Doctor Sajid Mehmood Ashraf | 13,333 | 12.58 | |
| PML(N) | Tariq Ahmad Gurmani | 11,095 | 10.47 | |
| Independent | Mian Aamir Sultan Goraya Advocate | 7,195 | 6.79 | |
| PTI | Mian Shahid Mustafa Qureshi | 4,632 | 4.37 | |
| PML(Q) | Malik Muhammad Mudassar Abbas Khar | 4,102 | 3.87 | |
| JUI (F) | Muhammad Iqbal Haneef | 2,847 | 2.69 | |
| Independent | Qadir Mehmood Sinawan | 2,806 | 2.65 | |
| Independent | Fazal Kareem | 1,119 | 1.06 | |
| Others | Others (sixteen candidates) | 4,143 | 3.91 | |
| Turnout | | 109,794 | 61.90 | |
| Total valid votes | | 105,970 | 96.52 | |
| Rejected ballots | | 3,824 | 3.48 | |
| Majority | | 2,933 | 2.77 | |
| Registered electors | | 177,386 | | |

== General elections 2008 ==
| Contesting candidates | Party affiliation | Votes polled |

== See also ==
- PP-276 Kot Addu-I
- PP-278 Kot Addu-III
