= Muhammad Imran Qureshi =

Pakistani politician

Member of the Provincial Assembly of the Punjab
- In office 29 May 2013 – 31 May 2018

Personal details
- Born: 24 June 1965 (age 61) Muzaffargarh
- Party: Pakistan Muslim League (Nawaz)

Muhammad Imran Qureshi is a Pakistani politician who was a Member of the Provincial Assembly of the Punjab, from May 2013 to May 2018.

== Early life and education ==
He was born on 24 June 1965 in village Thatta Quershian in Muzaffargarh.

He has the degree of Bachelor of Laws which he received in 1989 from Bahauddin Zakariya University.

== Political career ==
He was elected to the Provincial Assembly of the Punjab from Constituency PP-256 (Muzaffargarh-VI) in the 2008 Pakistani general election.

He was elected to the Provincial Assembly of the Punjab as a candidate of Pakistan Muslim League (Nawaz) from Constituency PP-256 (Muzaffargarh-VI) in the 2013 Pakistani general election.
