= Zehra Batool =

Pakistani politician

Provincial Assembly of Punjab provincial minister for religious affairs
- In office 19 October 2018 – 20 May 2022
- Constituency: PP-272 Muzaffargarh-V

Personal details
- Born: 17 August 1955 (age 70) Jatoi, West Punjab, Pakistan
- Party: AP (2025-present)
- Other political affiliations: PPP (2023-2025); IPP (2022-2023); PTI (2018-2022)
- Children: Syed Haroon Ahmed Sultan Bokhari (son); Syed Basit Sultan Bukhari (son)

Zehra Batool is a Pakistani politician and who was a member of the Provincial Assembly of Punjab from 2018 to 2022.

== Political career ==
Batool was elected to the Provincial Assembly of Punjab from the Constituency PP-272 (Muzaffargarh-V) in the 2018 Pakistani by-elections held on October 14, 2018, on PTI ticket.

This seat was vacated by her son Syed Basit Sultan Bukhari, who won both national and provincial assemblies seats. She was appointed minister for religious affairs by chief minister usman buzdar on 25 December 2021 after 2 months she Resigned on 7 February 2022

She was deseated due to vote against party policy for Chief Minister of Punjab election on 16 April 2022.

== Early life ==
She was born on August 17, 1955, at Jatoi Tehsil, Muzaffargarh District. She is daughter of Mr Khalil Ahmed. She is wife of Mr Abdullah Shah Bukhari.
