= PP-278 Kot Addu-III =

Constituency of the Punjabi Provincial Legislature, Pakistan

- Constituency for the Provincial Assembly of Punjab
- Region: Kot Addu Tehsil (partly) including Kot Addu city of Kot Addu District

Current constituency
- Created from: PP-252 Muzaffargarh-II (2002-2018); PP-279 Muzaffargarh-XII (2018-2023)

PP-278 Kot Addu-III (پی پی-278، کوٹ ادو-3) is a Constituency of Provincial Assembly of Punjab.

== General elections 2024 ==
Provincial election 2024: PP-278 Kot Addu-III
Party	Candidate	Votes	%	±%
Independent	Muhammad Ahsan Ali (Note: Filed nomination papers as PTI candidate but ECP allowed him to run as an Independent)	60,519	41.61	
PML(N)	Malik Ahmad Yar Hunjra	53,312	36.66	
PPP	Muhammad Asif Khan	6,403	4.40	
Independent	Umar Farooq	5,662	3.89	
Independent	Muhammad Ashraf Khan Rind	4,989	3.43	
Independent	Syed Muhammad Shahbaz Ghous	3,695	2.54	
TLP	Akhtar Hussain	3,187	2.19	
Independent	Muhammad Younis Khan	2,137	1.47	
Others	Others (eighteen candidates)	5,530	3.81	
Turnout		150,603	54.17	
Total valid votes		145,434	96.57	
Rejected ballots		5,169	3.43	
Majority		7,207	4.95	
Registered electors		278,017		
hold				

== General elections 2018 ==
Provincial election 2018: PP-279 Muzaffargarh-XII
Party	Candidate	Votes	%	±%
PTI	Muhammad Ashraf Khan Rind	42,606	42.68	
PML(N)	Malik Ahmad Yar Hunjra	24,729	24.77	
PPP	Muhammad Amjad Abbas	10,657	10.68	
MMA	Muhammad Arshad Siddiqui	7,250	7.26	
Independent	Malik Shakeel Ahmad Koria	5,029	5.04	
Independent	Tahir Mehmood	3,142	3.15	
TLP	Muhammad Yar Mehboob Khar	2,575	2.58	
Independent	Syed Fiyyaz Hussain Shah	1,775	1.78	
Independent	Rana Abdul Aziz Khan	1,575	1.58	
Others	Others (two candidates)	492	0.50	
Turnout		102,817	62.49	
Total valid votes		99,830	97.10	
Rejected ballots		2,987	2.90	
Majority		17,877	17.91	
Registered electors		164,539		

== General elections 2013 ==
Provincial election 2013: PP-252 Muzaffargarh-II
Party	Candidate	Votes	%	±%
Independent	Muhammad Zishan Gurmani	20,408	19.26	
PPP	Malik Bilal Ahmad Khar	17,475	16.49	
Independent	Niaz Hussain Khan Gishkoory	16,815	15.87	
Independent	Doctor Sajid Mehmood Ashraf	13,333	12.58	
PML(N)	Tariq Ahmad Gurmani	11,095	10.47	
Independent	Mian Aamir Sultan Goraya Advocate	7,195	6.79	
PTI	Mian Shahid Mustafa Qureshi	4,632	4.37	
PML(Q)	Malik Muhammad Mudassar Abbas Khar	4,102	3.87	
JUI (F)	Muhammad Iqbal Haneef	2,847	2.69	
Independent	Qadir Mehmood Sinawan	2,806	2.65	
Independent	Fazal Kareem	1,119	1.06	
Others	Others (sixteen candidates)	4,143	3.91	
Turnout		109,794	61.90	
Total valid votes		105,970	96.52	
Rejected ballots		3,824	3.48	
Majority		2,933	2.77	
Registered electors		177,386		

== General elections 2008 ==
Contesting candidates	Party affiliation	Votes polled	Status	Ref
			Winner	

== See also ==
- PP-277 Kot Addu-II
- PP-279 Layyah-I
