= PP-271 Muzaffargarh-IV =

Constituency of the Punjabi Provincial Legislature, Pakistan

- Constituency for the Provincial Assembly of Punjab
- Region: Muzaffargarh Tehsil (partly) of Muzaffargarh District

Current constituency
- Created from: PP-257 Muzaffargarh-VII (2002-2018); PP-276 Muzaffargarh-IX (2018-2023)

PP-271 Muzaffargarh-IV (پی پی-271، مظفرگڑھ-4) is a Constituency of Provincial Assembly of Punjab.

== General elections 2024 ==
Provincial election 2024: PP-271 Muzaffargarh-IV
Party	Candidate	Votes	%	±%
PML(N)	Muhammad Anon Hamid	29,206	25.86	
Independent	Mian Muhamad Imran (Note: Filed nomination papers as PTI candidate but ECP allowed him to run as an Independent)	27,434	24.29	
PPP	Muhammad Jameel Ahmad Shah	24,513	21.70	
TLP	Abdul Rasheed Sheikh	14,669	12.99	
Independent	Sabir Hussain Shah	4,072	3.61	
Independent	Malik Muhammad Ajmal	3,376	2.99	
JI	Hafiz Ahmad Mehmood	2,726	2.41	
Others	Others (sixteen candidates)	6,566	6.15	
Turnout		118,540	54.08	
Total valid votes		112,958	95.29	
Rejected ballots		5,582	4.71	
Majority		1,772	1.57	
Registered electors		219,194		
hold				

== General elections 2018 ==
Provincial election 2018: PP-276 Muzaffargarh-IX
Party	Candidate	Votes	%	±%
PTI	Muhammad Aown Hameed	32,154	33.81	
PPP	Muhammad Jamil Anmad Shah	24,885	26.17	
Independent	Malik Ahmed Kareem Qaswer Langrial	20,170	21.21	
TLP	Muhammad Shahzad Iqbal	7,231	7.60	
ARP	Jamshaid Ahmad Dasti	6,489	6.82	
MMA	Shair Ali	1,660	1.75	
Independent	Muhammad Abdullah Fahad	1,289	1.36	
Others	Others (nine candidates)	1,223	1.29	
Turnout		99,702	59.98	
Total valid votes		95,101	95.39	
Rejected ballots		4,601	4.61	
Majority		7,269	7.64	
Registered electors		166,215		

== General elections 2013 ==
Provincial election 2013: PP-257 Muzaffargarh-VII
Party	Candidate	Votes	%	±%
PML(N)	Malik Ahmad Karim Qaswar Langrial	33,138	39.90	
JUI (F)	Mian Khalid Mustafa Makwal	22,239	26.77	
PPP	Jam Mazhar Hussain Advocate	7,620	9.17	
Independent	Mumtaz Hussain	5,458	6.57	
Independent	Mian Imran Dhanotar	4,993	6.01	
PTI	Nawabzada Muhammad Ahmad Khan Babar	2,705	3.26	
Pakistan Human Rights Party	Waseem Hussan Langrial	2,444	2.94	
JI	Malik Muhammad Ramzan Rohadi	1,777	2.14	
Others	Others (eighteen candidates)	2,685	3.23	
Turnout		88,113	61.20	
Total valid votes		83,059	94.26	
Rejected ballots		5,054	5.74	
Majority		10,899	13.13	
Registered electors		143,987		

== General elections 2008 ==
Contesting candidates	Party affiliation	Votes polled

== See also ==
- PP-270 Muzaffargarh-III
- PP-272 Muzaffargarh-V
