= Sardar Aamir Talal Khan Gopang =

Pakistani politician

Member of the National Assembly of Pakistan
- Incumbent
- Assumed office 29 February 2024
- Constituency: NA-178 Muzaffargarh-IV
- In office 13 August 2018 – 10 August 2023
- Constituency: NA-186 (Muzaffargarh-VI)

Member of the Provincial Assembly of the Punjab
- In office 20 February 2008 – 31 May 2018

Personal details
- Born: Muzaffargarh, Punjab, Pakistan
- Party: PMLN (2013-2018; 2023-present)
- Other political affiliations: PTI (2018-2022); PML(Q) (2008-2013)

Sardar Aamir Talal Khan Gopang (Urdu: سردار عامر طلال خان گوپنگ) is a Pakistani politician who has been a member of the National Assembly of Pakistan since February 2024 and previously served in this position from August 2018 till August 2023. Previously he was a Member of the Provincial Assembly of the Punjab, from May 2013 to May 2018.

== Early life ==
He was born in 1970.

== Political career ==
He was elected to the Provincial Assembly of the Punjab as a candidate of PML-Q from Constituency PP-261 (Muzaffargarh-XI) in the 2008 Pakistani general election.

He was re-elected to the Provincial Assembly of the Punjab as an independent candidate from Constituency PP-261 (Muzaffargarh-XI) in the 2013 Pakistani general election. He joined Pakistan Muslim League (N) (PML-N) in May 2013.

In December 2013, he was appointed as Parliamentary Secretary for special education.

In May 2018, he quit PML-N and joined Pakistan Tehreek-e-Insaf (PTI).

He was elected to the National Assembly of Pakistan as a candidate of PTI from Constituency NA-186 (Muzaffargarh-VI) in the 2018 Pakistani general election.

He was elected to the National Assembly as a candidate of PML(N) from NA-178 Muzaffargarh-IV in the 2024 Pakistani general election. He received 114,678 votes and defeated Abdul Qayyum Khan Jatoi, a PTI-endorsed independent.

== More Reading ==
- List of members of the 15th National Assembly of Pakistan
