= Muhammad Aoon Hamid =

Pakistani politician

Member of the Provincial Assembly of the Punjab
- In office 15 August 2018 – 14 January 2023
- Constituency: PP-276 Muzaffargarh-IX

Personal details
- Born: 25 September 1978 (age 47)
- Party: IPP (2023-present)
- Other political affiliations: PTI (2018-2023)
- Relatives: Irfan Dogar (cousin)

Muhammad Aoon Hamid Dogar is a Pakistani politician who had been a member of the Provincial Assembly of the Punjab from August 2018 till January 2023.

== Political career ==
He was elected to the Provincial Assembly of the Punjab as a candidate of the Pakistan Tehreek-e-Insaf (PTI) from PP-276 Muzaffargarh-IX in the 2018 Punjab provincial election.

On 18 May 2023, he left the PTI due to the 2023 Pakistani protests.
