= Abdul Qayyum Khan Jatoi =

Pakistani politician

Sardar Abdul Qayyum Khan Jatoi

Member of the National Assembly of Pakistan Minister defence production
- In office 2002–2013
- Constituency: NA-180 (Muzaffargarh-V)

Personal details
- Party: PTI (2018-present)
- Other political affiliations: PPP (1990-2018)
- Children: Daud Khan Jatoi (son) Abdul mateen khan jatoi (son)

Abdul Qayyum Khan Jatoi is a Pakistani politician who had been a member of the National Assembly of Pakistan from 2002 to 2013.

He is the chief of Jatoi Tribe

== Political career ==
He joined Pakistan Peoples Party (PPP) in 1990s.

He was elected to the National Assembly of Pakistan from Constituency NA-180 (Muzaffargarh-V) as a candidate of PPP in 2002 Pakistani general election. He received 69,653 votes and defeated Sardar Ashiq Hussain. In the same election, he ran for the seat of the National Assembly from Constituency NA-179 (Muzaffargarh-IV) as a candidate of PPP but was unsuccessful. He received 38,589 votes and lost the seat to Syed Basit Sultan Bukhari.

In 2005, he became district nazim Muzaffargarh.

He was re-elected to the National Assembly from Constituency NA-180 (Muzaffargarh-V) as a candidate of PPP in 2008 Pakistani general election. He received 68,270 votes and defeated Sardar Ashiq Hussai. In the same election, he was elected to the Provincial Assembly of the Punjab from Constituency PP-258 (Muzaffargarh-VIII) as a candidate of PPP. He received 26,756 votes and defeated by Aoun Raza Gopang. He vacated the Punjab Assembly seat. In November 2008, he was inducted into the federal cabinet of Prime Minister Yousaf Raza Gillani and was made Federal Minister for Defence Production. He served as Minister for Defence Production until his resignation in 2010.

He ran for the seat of the National Assembly from Constituency NA-180 (Muzaffargarh-V) as a candidate of PPP in 2013 Pakistani general election but was unsuccessful. He received 41,548 votes and lost the seat to Sardar Ashiq Hussain.

In June 2018, he quit PPP.
