= NA-177 Muzaffargarh-III =

Constituency of the National Assembly of Pakistan

- Constituency for the National Assembly of Pakistan
- Region: Jatoi Tehsil (partly) including Jatoi city of Muzaffargarh District
- Electorate: 433,535

Current constituency
- Party: Sunni Ittehad Council
- Member: Moazam Ali Khan Jatoi
- Created from: NA-179 Muzaffargarh-IV

NA-177 Muzaffargarh-III (این اے-177، مُظفّرگڑھ-3) is a constituency for the National Assembly of Pakistan.

== Election 2002 ==
General elections were held on 10 October 2002. Syed Basit Sultan Bukhari of PML-Q won by 63,778 votes.

General election 2002: NA-179 Muzaffargarh-IV
Party	Candidate	Votes	%	±%
PML(Q)	Makhdoomzada Syed Basit Ahmad Sultan Bokhari	63,778	45.60	
PPP	Abdul Qayyum Khan Jatoi	38,589	27.59	
PDP	Abrar Ahmad Khan	27,227	19.47	
PML(N)	Makhdoom Jamil Ahmad Hussain Bokhari	9,942	7.11	
PAT	Mian Muhammad Shoaib Ashiq Daha	323	0.23	
Turnout		142,870	55.08	
Total valid votes		139,859	97.89	
Rejected ballots		3,011	2.11	
Majority		25,189	18.01	
Registered electors		259,395		

== Election 2008 ==
General elections were held on 18 February 2008. Muhammad Moazam Ali Khan Jatoi of PPP won by 79,643 votes.

General election 2008: NA-179 Muzaffargarh-IV
Party	Candidate	Votes	%	±%
PPP	Muhammad Moazam Ali Khan Jatoi	79,643	54.37	
PML(Q)	Makhdoomzada Syed Basit Ahmad Sultan Bokhari	60,637	41.39	
Others	Others (four candidates)	6,210	4.24	
Turnout		149,218	56.48	
Total valid votes		146,490	98.17	
Rejected ballots		2,728	1.83	
Majority		19,006	12.98	
Registered electors		264,185		
PPP gain from PML(Q)				

== Election 2013 ==
General elections were held on 11 May 2013. Syed Basit Sultan Bukhari of PML-N won by 110,197 votes and became the member of National Assembly.

General election 2013: NA-179 Muzaffargarh-IV
Party	Candidate	Votes	%	±%
PML(N)	Makhdoomzada Syed Basit Ahmad Sultan Bokhari	110,197	53.75	
PPP	Muhammad Moazam Ali Khan Jatoi	73,199	35.71	
PTI	Makhdoom Jamil Ahmad Hussain Bokhari	9,476	4.62	
Others	Others (eleven candidates)	12,136	5.92	
Turnout		212,544	62.19	
Total valid votes		205,008	96.45	
Rejected ballots		7,536	3.55	
Majority		36,998	18.04	
Registered electors		341,765		
PML(N) gain from PPP				

== Election 2018 ==
General elections were held on 25 July 2018.

General election 2018: NA-185 Muzaffargarh-V
Party	Candidate	Votes	%	±%
Independent	Syed Basit Sultan Bukhari	94,672	48.11	
PTI	Moazam Ali Khan Jatoi	73,185	37.19	
ARP	Jamshed Dasti	9,319	4.74	
TLP	Muhammad Masood Saeedi	8,285	4.21	
Independent	Rao Atif All Khan	5,574	2.83	
Independent	Sayeda Zahra Basit Bukhari	3,840	1.95	
Independent	Azra Parveen	1,526	0.78	
Independent	Muhammad Zafar Ullah Khan Laghari	396	0.20	
Turnout		204,477	58.23	
Total valid votes		196,797	96.24	
Rejected ballots		7,680	3.76	
Majority		21,487	10.92	
Registered electors		351,181		

== Election 2024 ==
General elections were held on 8 February 2024. Moazam Ali Khan Jatoi won the election with 114,057 votes.

General election 2024: NA-177 Muzaffargarh-III
Party	Candidate	Votes	%	±%
PTI	Moazam Ali Khan Jatoi (Note: Filed nomination papers as PTI candidate but ECP allowed him to run as an Independent)	114,057	50.90	▲13.71
PML(N)	Syeda Shehr Bano Bukhari	98,333	30.50	
TLP	Rao Atif Ali Khan	15,682	7.00	▲2.79
PPP	Zafar Ullah Khan Leghari	5,806	2.59	
JUI (F)	Syed Haroon Ahmed Sultan Bokhari	4,405	1.97	
Others	Others (eighteen candidates)	15,794	7.05	
Turnout		232,890	53.72	▼4.51
Total valid votes		224,077	96.22	
Rejected ballots		8,813	3.78	
Majority		16,057	20.41	
Registered electors		433,535		

== See also ==
- NA-176 Muzaffargarh-II
- NA-178 Muzaffargarh-IV
