= Muhammad Zeeshan Gurmani =

Pakistani politician

Member of the Provincial Assembly of the Punjab
- In office 29 May 2013 – 31 May 2018

Personal details
- Born: 1970 (age 55–56)
- Party: IPP (2025-present)
- Other political affiliations: PMLN (2013-2025)

Muhammad Zeeshan Gurmani is a Pakistani politician who was a Member of the Provincial Assembly of the Punjab, from May 2013 to May 2018.

== Early life ==
He was born in 1970.

== Political career ==
He was elected to the Provincial Assembly of the Punjab as an independent candidate from Constituency PP-252 (Muzaffargarh-II) in the 2013 Pakistani general election. He joined Pakistan Muslim League (N) in May 2013.

In April 2018, he announced to quit PML-N.
