= PP-274 Muzaffargarh-VII =

Constituency of the Punjabi Provincial Legislature, Pakistan

- Constituency for the Provincial Assembly of Punjab
- Region: Jatoi Tehsil (partly) and Alipur Tehsil (partly) including Alipur town in Muzaffargarh District

Current constituency
- Created from: PP-260 Muzaffargarh-X (2002-2018); PP-273 Muzaffargarh-VI (2018-2023) (2018-2023)

PP-274 Muzaffargarh-VII (پی پی-274، مظفرگڑھ-7) is a Constituency of Provincial Assembly of Punjab.

== General elections 2024 ==
Provincial election 2024: PP-274 Muzaffargarh-VII
Party	Candidate	Votes	%	±%
PML(N)	Syed Muhammad Sibitan Raza	44,818	42.08	
Independent	Shahzad Rasool Khan (Note: Filed nomination papers as PTI candidate but ECP allowed him to run as an Independent)	37,836	35.53	
PPP	Malik Abdul Aziz	7,581	7.12	
Independent	Syeda Zehra Basit Bukhari	4,378	4.11	
TLP	Baqir Hussain	4,245	3.99	
Others	Others (nine candidates)	7,641	7.17	
Turnout		110,334	54.06	
Total valid votes		106,499	96.52	
Rejected ballots		3,835	3.48	
Majority		6,982	6.55	
Registered electors		204,085		
hold				

== General elections 2018 ==
Provincial election 2018: PP-273 Muzaffargarh-VI
Party	Candidate	Votes	%	±%
PTI	Muhammad Sabtain Raza	36,369	34.39	
Independent	Rasool Bakhsh Khan	24,572	23.23	
Independent	Malik Abdul Aziz	22,249	21.04	
PML(N)	Shahid Rasool	14,944	14.13	
TLP	Muhammad Shafi Khan	5,162	4.88	
MMA	Asif Sheeraz Khan	1,506	1.42	
Others	Others (five candidates)	968	0.92	
Turnout		109,274	60.23	
Total valid votes		105,770	96.79	
Rejected ballots		3,504	3.21	
Majority		11,797	11.16	
Registered electors		181,439		

== General elections 2013 ==
Provincial election 2013: PP-260 Muzaffargarh-X
Party	Candidate	Votes	%	±%
Independent	Muhammad Sibtain Raza	29,713	35.98	
PPP	Shahzad Rasool Khan	22,945	27.78	
PML(N)	Ghulam Hussain Arshad	20,139	24.39	
MDM	Anus Bin Malik	3,676	4.45	
PTI	Malik Muhammad Amer	3,487	4.22	
Independent	Zulfiqar Ali Malik	1,167	1.41	
Others	Others (six candidates)	1,458	1.77	
Turnout		85,076	61.04	
Total valid votes		82,585	97.07	
Rejected ballots		2,491	2.93	
Majority		6,768	8.20	
Registered electors		139,368		

== General elections 2008 ==
Contesting candidates	Party affiliation	Votes polled

== See also ==
- PP-273 Muzaffargarh-VI
- PP-275 Muzaffargarh-VIII
