= Hammad Nawaz Khan =

Pakistani politician

Member of the Provincial Assembly of the Punjab
- In office 29 May 2013 – 31 May 2018

Personal details
- Born: 6 August 1964 (age 62) Muzaffargarh, Punjab, Pakistan
- Party: PMLN

Hammad Nawaz Khan is a Pakistani politician who was a Member of the Provincial Assembly of the Punjab, from May 2013 to May 2018.

== Early life and education ==
He was born on 6 August 1964 in Muzaffargarh.

He has received Intermediate level education.

== Political career ==
He was elected to the Provincial Assembly of the Punjab as a candidate of Pakistan Muslim League (Nawaz) from Constituency PP-254 (Muzaffargarh-IV) in the 2013 Pakistani general election.
