= PP-272 Muzaffargarh-V =

Constituency of the Punjabi Provincial Legislature, Pakistan

- Constituency for the Provincial Assembly of Punjab
- Region: Muzaffargarh Tehsil (partly) and Jatoi Tehsil (partly) including Shehasultan town in Muzaffargarh District

Current constituency
- Created from: PP-259 Muzaffargarh-IX (2002-2018); PP-272 Muzaffargarh-V (2018-)

PP-272 Muzaffargarh-V (پی پی-272، مظفرگڑھ-5) is a Constituency of Provincial Assembly of Punjab.

== General elections 2024 ==
Provincial election 2024: PP-272 Muzaffargarh-V
Party	Candidate	Votes	%	±%
Independent	Rana Abdul Mannan Sajid (Note: Filed nomination papers as PTI candidate but ECP allowed him to run as an Independent)	33,474	32.48	
PML(N)	Syed Basit Sultan Bukhari	29,988	29.10	
TLP	Muhammad Abdullah Fahd	15,613	15.15	
JUI (F)	Syed Haroon Ahmed Sultan Bokhari	10,151	9.85	
PPP	Mian Saleem Asghar	8,410	8.16	
Others	Others (twenty two candidates)	5,422	5.26	
Turnout		107,156	50.95	
Total valid votes		103,058	96.18	
Rejected ballots		4,098	3.82	
Majority		3,486	3.38	
Registered electors		210,309		
hold				

== General elections 2018 ==
Provincial election 2018: PP-272 Muzaffargarh-V
Party	Candidate	Votes	%	±%
Independent	Makhdoomzada Syed Basit Ahmad Sultan Bokhari	23,649	26.37	
PTI	Muhammad Zia Ullah Khan	18,227	20.33	
MMA	Muhammad Abdullah Fahad	17,091	19.06	
PML(N)	Syed Haroon Ahmad Sultan	15,984	17.82	
ARP	Shahzad Furqan	9,327	10.40	
TLP	Abdul Jabbar	3,065	3.42	
Independent	Muhammad Moazam Ali Khan Jatoi	1,116	1.24	
Others	Others (five candidates)	1,221	1.36	
Turnout		94,556	56.88	
Total valid votes		89,680	94.84	
Rejected ballots		4,876	5.16	
Majority		5,422	6.04	
Registered electors		166,247		

== General elections 2013 ==
Provincial election 2013: PP-259 Muzaffargarh-IX
Party	Candidate	Votes	%	±%
PML(N)	Sardar Khan Muhammad	46,027	47.56	
PPP	Sardar Sami Ullah Khan Lagari	40,785	42.14	
JUI (F)	Muhammad Yahaya Abbasi	4,584	4.74	
PTI	Muhammad Jaffar	3,624	3.74	
Others	Others (eleven candidates)	1,763	1.82	
Turnout		100,033	64.77	
Total valid votes		96,783	96.75	
Rejected ballots		3,250	3.25	
Majority		5,242	5.42	
Registered electors		154,452		

== See also ==
- PP-271 Muzaffargarh-IV
- PP-273 Muzaffargarh-VI
