= Mohsin Ali Qureshi =

Pakistani politician

Muhammad Mohsin Ali Qureshi

Member of the National Assembly of Pakistan
- In office 2008–2013
- Constituency: NA-176 (Muzaffargarh-I)

Personal details
- Born: 1948
- Died: 2014 (aged 65–66)
- Children: Shabbir Ali Qureshi (son)

Mian Muhammad Mohsin Ali Qureshi (1948-2014) was a Pakistani politician who had been a member of the National Assembly of Pakistan from 2008 to 2013.

== Political career ==
Benazir Bhutto offered him party ticket of Pakistan Peoples Party (PPP) to contest the 2002 Pakistani general election however he could not contest the polls due to graduation bar.

After doing graduation, he was elected to the National Assembly of Pakistan from Constituency NA-176 (Muzaffargarh-I) as a candidate of PPP in the 2008 Pakistani general election. He received 50,826 votes and defeated Malik Ghulam Qasim Hinjra, a candidate of Pakistan Muslim League (Q) (PML-Q).

In the same election, he ran for the seat of the Provincial Assembly of the Punjab from Constituency PP-251 (Muzaffargarh-I) as an independent candidate but was unsuccessful. He received 168 votes and lost the seat to Malik Ahmad Yar Hunjra.

In 2009, he suffered a brain hemorrhage. He remained in coma for five years before dying in 2014.
