= Niaz Hussain Khan =

Pakistani politician

Member of the Provincial Assembly of the Punjab
- In office 15 August 2018 – 14 January 2023
- Constituency: PP-278 Muzaffargarh-XI

Personal details
- Party: JUI (F) (2025-present)
- Other political affiliations: IPP (2023-2025); PTI (2018-2023)

Niaz Hussain Khan is a Pakistani politician who had been a member of the Provincial Assembly of the Punjab from August 2018 till January 2023.

== Political career ==
He was elected to the Provincial Assembly of the Punjab as a candidate of the Pakistan Tehreek-e-Insaf (PTI) from PP-278 Muzaffargarh-XI in the 2018 Punjab provincial election.

On 18 May 2023, he left the PTI due to the 2023 Pakistani protests.
