= Muhammad Ashraf Khan Rind =

Pakistani politician

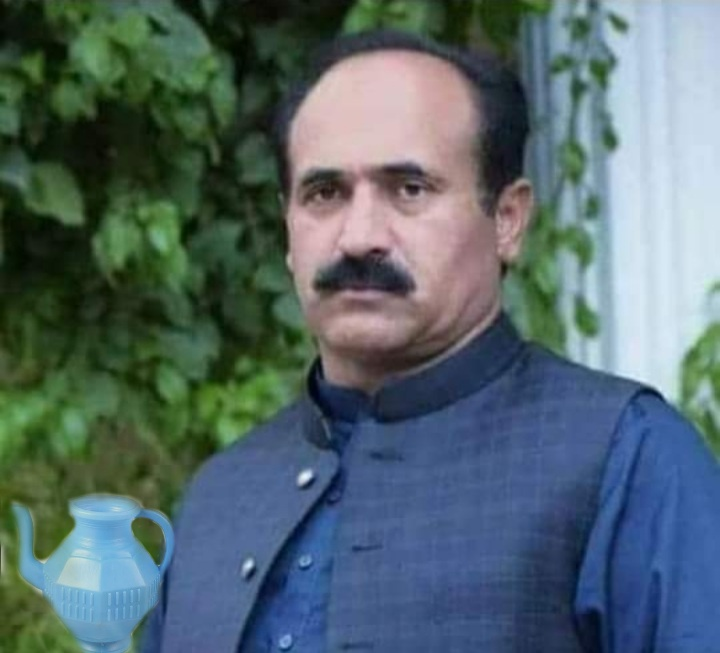

Member of the Provincial Assembly of the Punjab
- In office 15 August 2018 – 14 January 2023
- Constituency: PP-279 Muzaffargarh-XII

Personal details
- Party: PTI

Muhammad Ashraf Khan Rind is a Pakistani politician who had been a member of the Provincial Assembly of the Punjab from August 2018 till January 2023.

== Political career ==
He was elected to the Provincial Assembly of the Punjab as a candidate of the Pakistan Tehreek-e-Insaf (PTI) from PP-279 Muzaffargarh-XII in the 2018 Punjab provincial election.

On 18 May 2023, he left the PTI due to the 2023 Pakistani protests.
