= Shabbir Ali Qureshi =

Pakistani politician

Shabir Ali Qureshi
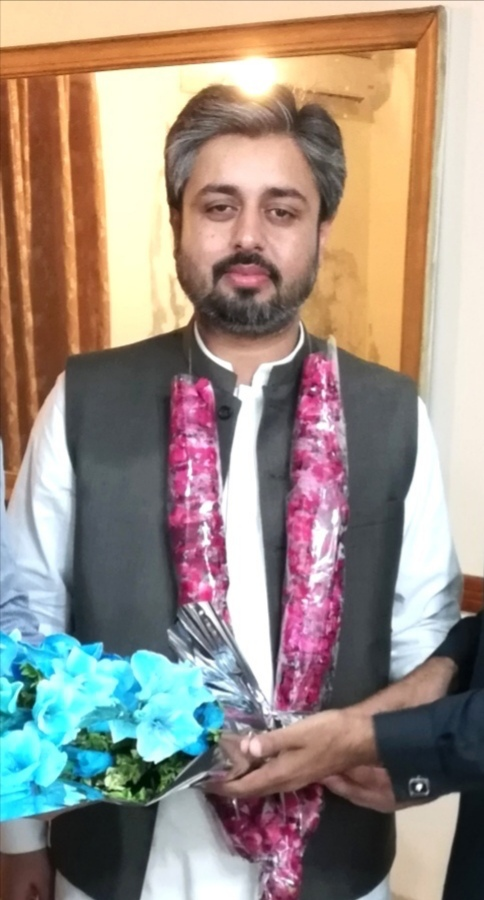

Minister of State for Housing and Works
- In office 2018–2022
- President: Arif Alvi
- Prime Minister: Imran Khan

Member of the National Assembly of Pakistan
- Incumbent
- Assumed office 29 February 2024
- Constituency: NA-179 Kot Addu-I
- In office 13 August 2018 – 10 August 2023
- Constituency: NA-181 (Muzaffargarh-I)

Personal details
- Born: Kot Addu, Pakistan, Punjab, Pakistan
- Party: PTI (2018-present)
- Parent: Mohsin Ali Qureshi (father)

Mian Muhammad Shabbir Ali Qureshi is a Pakistani politician and the founder of District Kot Addu. He formerly served as the Minister of State for Housing and Works, holding office from 4 October 2018 till April 2022. He has been a Member of the National Assembly of Pakistan since February 2024 and previously served in this position from August 2018 until January 2023. He is the son of Mohsin Ali Qureshi, a politician who was also elected as a member of the National Assembly twice from the same constituency.

== Personal life ==
Shabir Ali Qureshi was born in Kot Addu. He is the son of Mohsin Ali Qureshi. He has a sibling, Ahsan Ali Qureshi, who is a Member of the Provincial Assembly of the Punjab.

== Political career ==
He was elected to the National Assembly of Pakistan from Constituency NA-181 (Muzaffargarh-I) as an independent candidate in the 2018 Pakistani general election.

Following his successful election, he announced to joined Pakistan Tehreek-e-Insaf (PTI) in August 2018.

On 11 September 2018, he was inducted into the federal cabinet of Prime Minister Imran Khan. On 4 October 2018, he was appointed as Minister of State for Housing and Works.

He was elected to the National Assembly from NA-179 Kot Addu-I as a PTI-endorsed independent candidate in the 2024 Pakistani general election. He received 104,329 votes and defeated Malik Ghulam Qasim Hanjra, a candidate of Pakistan Muslim League (N) (PML(N)).
