= Syed Muhammad Sibtain Raza =

Pakistani politician

Member of the Provincial Assembly of the Punjab
- In office 21 July 2022 – 14 January 2023
- Constituency: PP-273 Muzaffargarh-VI
- In office 15 August 2018 – 29 May 2022
- Constituency: PP-273 Muzaffargarh-VI
- In office 1 June 2013 – 31 May 2018
- Constituency: PP-260 (Muzaffargarh-X)

Personal details
- Born: 28 April 1973 (age 53)
- Party: IPP (2025-present)
- Other political affiliations: PMLN (2022-2025); PTI (2018-2023)

Syed Muhammad Sibtain Raza is a Pakistani politician who had been a Member of the Provincial Assembly of the Punjab, from July 2018 till January 2023. He was also a Member of the Provincial Assembly of Punjab from August 2018 till May 2022 and from June 2013 till May 2018.

== Early life and education ==
He was born on 28 April 1973.

He has done graduation in law.

== Political career ==
He was elected to the Provincial Assembly of the Punjab as an independent candidate from Constituency PP-260 (Muzaffargarh-X) in 2013 Pakistani general election. He joined Pakistan Muslim League (N) in May 2013.

In May 2018, he announced to quit PML-N and join Pakistan Tehreek-e-Insaf (PTI).

He was re-elected to Provincial Assembly of the Punjab as a candidate of PTI from Constituency PP-273 (Muzaffargarh-VI) in 2018 Pakistani general election. He was appointed Parliamentary Secretary for Higher Education Punjab soon after taking oath as MPA and still holds office. He de-seated due to vote against party policy for Chief Minister of Punjab election on 16 April 2022.
