= Mehr Irshad Ahmed Sial =

Pakistani politician

Mehr Irshad Ahmed Khan Sial

Special Assistant to the Prime Minister on Inter Provincial Coordination
- In office 2022–2023

Member of the National Assembly of Pakistan
- In office 13 August 2018 – 10 August 2023
- Constituency: NA-182 (Muzaffargarh-II)

Personal details
- Born: January 1, 1967 (age 59) Muzaffargarh, Pakistan
- Party: PPPP (1990-2025)

Mehr Irshad Ahmed Khan Sial (born January 1, 1967) is a Pakistani politician who had been a member of the National Assembly of Pakistan from August 2018 till August 2023 . During his tenure he also held the position of Special Assistant to the PM on Inter Provincial Coordination. He was born on January 1, 1967, at Muzzaffargarh.

== Political career ==
He was elected to Provincial Assembly of the Punjab as candidate of PPP from PP 254 Muzaffargarh in the 2008 Pakistan general elections. He was elected to the National Assembly of Pakistan from Constituency NA-182 (Muzaffargarh-II) as a candidate of Pakistan Peoples Party in the 2018 Pakistani general election.
