= Ghulam Murtaza Raheem Khar =

Pakistani politician

Member of the Provincial Assembly of the Punjab
- In office 29 May 2013 – 31 May 2018

Personal details
- Born: 19 September 1977 (age 49) Muzaffargarh, Punjab, Pakistan
- Party: Pakistan Tehreek-e-Insaf (since 2018)
- Other political affiliations: Pakistan Muslim League (N) (2013-2018); Pakistan Muslim League (Q) (2002-2013)

Malik Ghulam Murtaza Raheem Khar is a Pakistani politician who was a Member of the Provincial Assembly of the Punjab, from May 2013 to May 2018.

== Early life and education ==
He was born on 19 September 1977 in Muzaffargarh and belongs to landlord Khar family.

He graduated in 1997 from University of the Punjab and has a BA degree.

== Political career ==
He was elected to the Provincial Assembly of the Punjab as an independent candidate from Constituency PP-253 (Muzaffargarh-III) in the 2013 Pakistani general election. He joined Pakistan Muslim League (N) in May 2013.
