= Malik Ghulam Arbi Khar =

Pakistani politician

Member of the National Assembly of Pakistan

Personal details
- Born: August 13, 1944
- Died: 4 March 2013 (aged 68)
- Spouse: Safina Saima Khar

Malik Ghulam Arbi Khar (Urdu: ملک غلام عربی کھر; 13 August 1944- 4 March 2013) was a Pakistani politician who was a member of the National Assembly of Pakistan

He was first elected to National Assembly of Pakistan in the 1993 Pakistani general election.
