= PP-273 Muzaffargarh-VI =

Constituency of the Punjabi Provincial Legislature, Pakistan

- Constituency for the Provincial Assembly of Punjab
- Region: Jatoi Tehsil (partly) including Jatoi city in Muzaffargarh District

Current constituency
- Created: 2018
- Member: vacant
- Created from: PP-258 Muzaffargarh-VIII (2002-2018); PP-275 Muzaffargarh-VIII (2018-2023)

PP-273 Muzaffargarh-VI (پی پی-273، مظفرگڑھ-6) is a Constituency of Provincial Assembly of Punjab.

== General elections 2024 ==
Provincial election 2024: PP-273 Muzaffargarh-VI
Party	Candidate	Votes	%	±%
Independent	Daud Khan Jatoi (Note: Filed nomination papers as PTI candidate but ECP allowed him to run as an Independent)	54,907	45.41	
PML(N)	Allah Wasaya Urf Chunnu Khan	38,638	31.95	
Independent	Muhammad Jaffar	6,382	5.28	
TLP	Muhammad Asif Saleem	6,233	5.16	
JUI (F)	Muhammad Yahya Abbasi	5,517	4.56	
PPP	Khan Muhammad	4,589	3.80	
Others	Others (seventeen candidates)	4,654	3.84	
Turnout		125,585	56.26	
Total valid votes		120,920	96.29	
Rejected ballots		4,665	3.71	
Majority		16,269	13.46	
Registered electors		223,226		
hold				

== General elections 2018 ==
Provincial election 2018: PP-276 Muzaffargarh-VIII
Party	Candidate	Votes	%	±%
Independent	Khurrum Sohail Khan Laghari	48,957	46.40	
Independent	Abdul Qayyum Khan Jatoi	33,954	32.18	
Independent	Azra Parveen	11,027	10.45	
MMA	Liaqat Ali	3,419	3.24	
TLP	Abdul Hai	2,256	2.14	
Independent	Sardar Sami Ullah Khan	1,764	1.67	
PML(N)	Syed Haroon Ahmad Sultan	1,159	1.10	
Others	Others (six candidates)	2,968	2.81	
Turnout		109,518	59.22	
Total valid votes		105,504	96.34	
Rejected ballots		4,014	3.66	
Majority		15,003	14.22	
Registered electors		184,934		

== General elections 2013 ==
Provincial election 2013: PP-258 Muzaffargarh-VIII
Party	Candidate	Votes	%	±%
PML(N)	Syed Haroon Ahmed Sultan Bokhari	46,419	54.96	
PPP	Malik Abdul Aziz	24,986	29.58	
JUI (F)	Rao Atif Ali Khan	7,147	8.46	
PTI	Syed Muhammad Raham Ali Bokhari	3,660	4.33	
Others	Others (eight candidates)	2,253	2.67	
Turnout		87,217	60.13	
Total valid votes		84,465	96.84	
Rejected ballots		2,752	3.16	
Majority		21,433	25.38	
Registered electors		145,042		

== General elections 2008 ==
Contesting candidates	Party affiliation	Votes polled

== See also ==
- PP-272 Muzaffargarh-V
- PP-274 Muzaffargarh-VII
