= Safina Saima Khar =

Pakistani politician

Safina Saima Khar is a Pakistani politician who served as a member of the Provincial Assembly of the Punjab from 2008 to 2013 on the reserved seat for women on the ticket of Pakistan Peoples Party.

== Family ==
She was married to a former member of the National Assembly Malik Ghulam Arbi Khar, a prominent member of a landlord family in Muzaffargarh. She has two children.
