= Ghulam Noor Rabbani Khar =

Pakistani politician (1947–2022)

Ghulam Rabbani Khar
- غلام ربانی کھر

Member of the National Assembly of Pakistan
- In office 2013–2018
- In office 1997–1999
- In office 1990–1993

Personal details
- Born: 31 December 1947 Muzaffargarh, Pakistan
- Died: 24 January 2022 (aged 74)
- Party: Pakistan Peoples Party
- Children: Hina Rabbani Khar; Raza Rabbani Khar
- Relatives: Ghulam Mustafa Khar (brother); Aaminah Haq (niece)

Malik Ghulam Noor Rabbani Khar (Urdu: ملک غلام نور ربانی کھر; 1947 – 24 January 2022) was a Pakistani politician who was a member of the National Assembly of Pakistan from September 2013 to May 2018.

== Political career ==
Rabbani Khar was elected as the member of the National Assembly for the first time from two constituencies, NA-137 and NA-138, in 1990 Pakistani general election.

He was re-elected to the National Assembly for the second time in 1997 Pakistani general election.

Rabbani Khar was the father of Hina Rabbani Khar and the younger brother of Ghulam Mustafa Khar.

He couldn't run in the 2002 Pakistani general election because he did not have an undergraduate degree to his name.

Rabbani Khar contested the seat of National Assembly on a ticket of Pakistan Peoples Party from NA-177 (Muzaffargarh) in 2013 Pakistani general election, but was unsuccessful.

He was re-elected as the member of the National Assembly on a ticket of Pakistan Peoples Party from NA-177 (Muzaffargarh) in by-election held in September 2013. The seat had become vacant after Jamshed Dasti who won it in 2013 election vacated it in order to retain the seat he won in his home constituency NA-178 (Muzaffargarh-III).

Rabbani Khar died on 24 January 2022 at the age of 74.
