= PP-270 Muzaffargarh-III =

Constituency of the Punjabi Provincial Legislature, Pakistan

- Constituency for the Provincial Assembly of Punjab
- Region: Muzaffargarh Tehsil (partly) including Khangarh town of Muzaffargarh District

Current constituency
- Created from: PP-256 Muzaffargarh-VI (2002-2018); PP-271 Muzaffargarh-IV (2018-2023) (2018-2023)

PP-270 Muzaffargarh-III (پی پی-270، مظفرگڑھ-3) is a Constituency of Provincial Assembly of Punjab.

== General elections 2024 ==
Provincial election 2024: PP-270 Muzaffargarh-III
Party	Candidate	Votes	%	±%
Independent	Zahid Ismail Bhutta (Note: Filed nomination papers as PTI Candidate but ECP allowed him to run as an independent)	28,439	24.97	
PML(N)	Mian Imtiaz Aleem Qureshi	24,427	21.45	
PPP	Adnan Khalid	22,253	19.54	
Independent	Nawabazada Mansoor Ahmed Khan	13,660	15.60	
Independent	Akhtar Ali Baloch	8,204	7.20	
TLP	Saeed Ahmad Zaffar	5,306	4.66	
Independent	Matloob Hussain	2,036	1.79	
Others	Others (eleven candidates)	5,451	4.79	
Turnout		118,912	52.41	
Total valid votes		113,876	95.76	
Rejected ballots		5,036	4.24	
Majority		4,012	3.52	
Registered electors		226,905		
hold				

== General elections 2018 ==
Provincial election 2018: PP-271 Muzaffargarh-IV
Party	Candidate	Votes	%	±%
PTI	Nawabzada Mansoor Ahmad Khan	26,051	24.95	
ARP	Muhammad Aamir Karamat	18,554	17.77	
PPP	Akhtar Ali Balouch	17,462	16.72	
Independent	Muhammad Imran	16,167	15.48	
Independent	Muhammad Ismail	15,192	14.55	
PML(N)	Abdul Wahab	4,062	3.89	
MMA	Abdul Rasheed Sheikh	3,529	3.38	
Independent	Aamir Abdullah	1,348	1.29	
Others	Others (seven candidates)	2,055	1.97	
Turnout		109,588	57.98	
Total valid votes		104,420	95.28	
Rejected ballots		5,168	4.72	
Majority		7,497	7.18	
Registered electors		189,026		

== General elections 2013 ==
Provincial election 2013: PP-256 Muzaffargarh-VI
Party	Candidate	Votes	%	±%
Independent	Muhammad Imran Qureshi	30,118	31.39	
PML(N)	Muhammad Amir Karamat	27,435	28.59	
PTI	Nawabzada Mansoor Ahmed Khan	25,168	26.23	
PPP	Al Haj Mian Sajjad Hussain Qureshi	5,842	6.09	
MWM	Syed Muhammad Abass Raza	2,672	2.78	
Independent	Muhammad Akram Baloch	1,335	1.39	
Others	Others (ten candidates)	3,380	3.52	
Turnout		99,526	64.17	
Total valid votes		95,950	96.41	
Rejected ballots		3,576	3.59	
Majority		2,683	2.80	
Registered electors		155,108		

== General elections 2008 ==
Contesting candidates	Party affiliation	Votes polled

== See also ==
- PP-269 Muzaffargarh-II
- PP-271 Muzaffargarh-IV
