= PP-275 Muzaffargarh-VIII =

Constituency of the Punjabi Provincial Legislature, Pakistan

- Constituency for the Provincial Assembly of Punjab
- Region: Alipur Tehsil (partly) including Khairpur Sadat town of Muzaffargarh District

Current constituency
- Created from: PP-261 Muzaffargarh-XI (2002-2018); PP-274 Muzaffargarh-VII (2018-2023)

PP-275 Muzaffargarh-VIII (پی پی-275، مظفرگڑھ-8) is a Constituency of Provincial Assembly of Punjab.

== General elections 2024 ==
Provincial election 2024: PP-275 Muzaffargarh-VIII
Party	Candidate	Votes	%	±%
PML(N)	Muhammad Nawab Khan Gopang	58,278	49.39	
Independent	Amna Qaim (Note: Filed nomination papers as PTI candidate but ECP allowed him to run as an Independent)	42,347	39.08	
TLP	Hafiz Zafar Hussain Zafar Fareedi	4,333	3.67	
PPP	Fareeha Batool	3,905	3.31	
Others	Others (six candidates)	5,363	4.55	
Turnout		123,125	54.84	
Total valid votes		117,992	95.83	
Rejected ballots		5,133	4.17	
Majority		12,165	10.31	
Registered electors		224,527		
hold				

== General elections 2018 ==
Provincial election 2018: PP-274 Muzaffargarh-VII
Party	Candidate	Votes	%	±%
PTI	Muhammad Raza Hussian Bukhari	27,858	32.36	
Independent	Muhammad Nawab Khan Gopang	26,181	30.41	
Independent	Muhammad Qaim Shah	25,583	29.72	
PML(N)	Muhammad Abdullah	5,900	6.85	
Independent	Syed Haroon Ahmad Sultan	570	0.66	
Turnout		89,171	60.90	
Total valid votes		86,092	96.55	
Rejected ballots		3,079	3.45	
Majority		1,677	1.95	
Registered electors		146,434		

== General elections 2013 ==
Provincial election 2013: PP-261 Muzaffargarh-XI
Party	Candidate	Votes	%	±%
Independent	Aamir Talal Khan	41,925	50.01	
PML(N)	Syed Muhammad Qaim Ali Shah Shamsi	26,804	31.97	
PPP	Rasool Bux Khan	9,704	11.57	
MDM	Ashiq Hussain	2,415	2.88	
PTI	Ghulam Yasin	1,415	1.69	
Others	Others (four candidates)	1,576	1.88	
Turnout		86,841	66.79	
Total valid votes		83,839	96.54	
Rejected ballots		3,002	3.46	
Majority		15,121	18.04	
Registered electors		130,024		

== General elections 2008 ==
Contesting candidates	Party affiliation	Votes polled

== See also ==
- PP-274 Muzaffargarh-VII
- PP-276 Kot Addu-I
