= Alipur Tehsil =

Alipur Tehsil تحصِيل على پُور
- Tehsil
- Country: Pakistan
- Region: Punjab, Pakistan
- District: Muzaffargarh
- Capital: Alipur
- Towns: 1
- Union councils: 14

Area
  - Tehsil: 1,391 km^{2} (537 sq mi)

Population (2023)
  - Tehsil: 760,526
  - Density: 546.7/km^{2} (1,416/sq mi)
  - Urban: 177,893 (23.39%)
  - Rural: 582,633 (76.61%)

Literacy (2023)
  - Literacy rate: Total: (39.15%); Male: (47.23%); Female: (30.69%)
- Time zone: UTC+5 (PST)
  - Summer (DST): UTC+6 (PDT)
- Postal code: 34450
- Area code: 066
- Website: www.Alipurpk.com

Alipur (Urdu: تحصِيل على پُور), is a tehsil (an administrative subdivision) of Muzaffargarh District that falls in DG Khan Division, in the Punjab province of Pakistan. Its capital is Alipur City. Alipur was a Panwar Rajput state till 1701. Later this territory came under the control of the newly established nawabs of Muzaffargarh.

== Administration ==
The tehsil of Alipur is administratively subdivided into 20 Union Councils, these are:

- Damar wala Janobi ڈمر والا جنوبی
- Alipur Merani علی پور میرانی
- Alipur Urban علی پور اربن
- Ali Wali على والی
- Bait Mullanwali بیٹ ملاں والی
- Bazwala باز والا
- ٖLatti لتی
- Fatehpur Janubi فتح پور جنوبی
- Ghalwanگھلواں
- Khair pur Sadat خیر پور سادات
- Khangarh Doma خانگڑھ دوئمہ
- Basti Disi بستی ڈیسی
- Mission Kot Bhowa مسن کوٹ
- Muradpur Janubi مراد پور جنوبی
- Gabbar Arrain گبرآرائیں
- Seet pur سیت پور
- Sultanpur سلطان پور
- Yakaywali یاکیوالی
- Banda Shah بندے شاہ
- Basti Badani Khair pur sadaatبستی بڈانی خیرپورسادت

== Demographics ==
=== Population ===
Historical population
| Year | Pop. | ±% p.a. |
|---|---|---|
| 1951 | 115,374 | — |
| 1961 | 131,354 | +1.31% |
| 1972 | 173,656 | +2.57% |
| 1981 | 231,376 | +3.24% |
| 1998 | 398,053 | +3.24% |
| 2017 | 640,384 | +2.53% |
| 2023 | 760,526 | +2.91% |

As of the 2023 census, Alipur tehsil has population of 760,526. Out of which, Urban population is 177,893 which is nearly 23.39% and rural population is 582,633.

As of the 2023 census, Alipur Tehsil has a total literacy rate of 39.15%, with male literacy at 47.23% and female literacy at 30.69%.
