= PP-276 Kot Addu-I =

Constituency of the Punjabi Provincial Legislature, Pakistan

- Constituency for the Provincial Assembly of Punjab
- Region: Chowk Sarwar Shaheed Tehsil and Kot Addu Tehsil (partly) of Kot Addu District

Current constituency
- Created from: PP-251 Muzaffargarh-I (2002-2018); PP-268 Muzaffargarh-I (2018-2023)

PP-276 Kot Addu-I (پی پی-276، کوٹ ادو-1) is a Constituency of Provincial Assembly of Punjab.

== General elections 2024 ==
Provincial election 2024: PP-276 Kot Addu-I
| Party | Candidate | Votes | % | ±% |
|---|---|---|---|---|
| Independent | Rana Aourang Zaib (Note: Filed nomination papers as PTI candidate but ECP allowed him to run as an Independent) | 47,225 | 34.87 | |
| PML(N) | Amjad Pervaz | 37,760 | 27.88 | |
| TLP | Syed Muhammad Jafar Muzammil | 24,564 | 18.14 | |
| Independent | Ghulam Murtaza Raheem | 17,553 | 12.96 | |
| PPP | Razia Manzoor | 2,014 | 1.49 | |
| Others | Others (twenty four candidates) | 6,314 | 4.66 | |
| Turnout | | 140,146 | 59.02 | |
| Total valid votes | | 135,430 | 96.63 | |
| Rejected ballots | | 4,716 | 3.37 | |
| Majority | | 9,465 | 6.99 | |
| Registered electors | | 237,435 | | |
| hold | | | | |

== General elections 2018 ==
Provincial election 2018: PP-268 Muzaffargarh-I
| Party | Candidate | Votes | % | ±% |
|---|---|---|---|---|
| PML(N) | Malik Ghulam Qasim Hinjra | 30,492 | 31.05 | |
| Independent | Rana Aurang Zaib | 29,278 | 29.81 | |
| Independent | Syed Muhammad Jafir Muzamil | 21,358 | 21.75 | |
| PTI | Tariq Mehmood | 7,249 | 7.38 | |
| TLP | Abid Manzoor | 5,675 | 5.78 | |
| Independent | Muhammad Aslam Khan | 2,605 | 2.65 | |
| Others | Others (five candidates) | 1,547 | 1.58 | |
| Turnout | | 101,547 | 62.65 | |
| Total valid votes | | 98,204 | 96.71 | |
| Rejected ballots | | 3,343 | 3.29 | |
| Majority | | 1,214 | 1.24 | |
| Registered electors | | 162,078 | | |

== General elections 2013 ==
Provincial election 2013: PP-251 Muzaffargarh-I
| Party | Candidate | Votes | % | ±% |
|---|---|---|---|---|
| PML(N) | Ahmad Yar | 33,502 | 33.91 | |
| PTI | Muhammad Ashraf Khan Rind | 30,952 | 31.33 | |
| JUI (F) | Muhammad Arashad Siddqui | 16,141 | 16.34 | |
| Independent | Muhammad Yousaf | 9,432 | 9.55 | |
| PPP | Muhammad Amjad Abbas | 4,474 | 4.53 | |
| MWM | Shoukat Ali | 1,561 | 1.58 | |
| Others | Others (thirteen candidates) | 2,743 | 2.78 | |
| Turnout | | 102,783 | 63.93 | |
| Total valid votes | | 98,805 | 96.13 | |
| Rejected ballots | | 3,978 | 3.87 | |
| Majority | | 2,550 | 2.58 | |
| Registered electors | | 160,772 | | |

== General elections 2008 ==
| Contesting candidates | Party affiliation | Votes polled | Status | Ref |
|---|---|---|---|---|
| Malik Ahmed Yar Hinjra | Pakistan Muslim League-N | | Winner | |

== See also ==
- PP-275 Muzaffargarh-VIII
- PP-277 Kot Addu-II
