= Syed Haroon Ahmed Sultan Bokhari =

Pakistani politician

Member of the Provincial Assembly of the Punjab
- In office 18 October 2002 – 31 May 2018

Personal details
- Born: 2 February 1968 (age 58) Multan, Punjab, Pakistan
- Party: JUI (F) (2024-present)
- Other political affiliations: PPP (2023-2024); PTI (2018-2022); PMLN (2013-2018); PPP (2008-2013); PML(Q) (2001-2008); PMLN (1997-1999); PPP (1993-1996)

Syed Haroon Ahmed Sultan Bokhari is a Pakistani politician who was a Member of the Provincial Assembly of the Punjab, from 2002 to May 2018.

== Early life and education ==
He was born on 2 February 1968 in Multan.

He has a degree of Master of Business Administration which he obtained in 2002 from University of Liverpool.

== Political career ==
He was elected to the Provincial Assembly of the Punjab as a candidate of Pakistan Muslim League (Q) from Constituency PP-258 (Muzaffargarh-VIII) in the 2002 Pakistani general election. He remained Provincial Minister of Punjab for Livestock and Dairy Development from 2003 to 2007.

He was re-elected to the Provincial Assembly of the Punjab as an independent candidate from Constituency PP-258 (Muzaffargarh-VIII) in the 2008 Pakistani general election.

He was re-elected to the Provincial Assembly of the Punjab as a candidate of Pakistan Muslim League (Nawaz) from Constituency PP-258 (Muzaffargarh-VIII) in the 2013 Pakistani general election.

In June 2013, he was inducted into the provincial cabinet of Chief Minister Shahbaz Sharif and was made Provincial Minister of Punjab for Auqaf and Religious Affairs. He remained Minister for Auqaf and Religious Affairs until the cabinet reshuffle in November 2016 when he was made Provincial Minister of Punjab for Social Welfare and Bait-ul-Maal. In December 2016, his ministerial portfolio was changed to Housing, Urban Development and Public Health Engineering.

On 1 May 2023, he joined the Pakistan People's Party (PPP).

In January 2024; he left the PPP and joined the Jamiat Ulema-e-Islam (F) (JUI(F)).
