= Muzaffargarh District =

District in Punjab, Pakistan

Muzaffargarh District ضِلع مُظفّرگڑھ
- District of Punjab
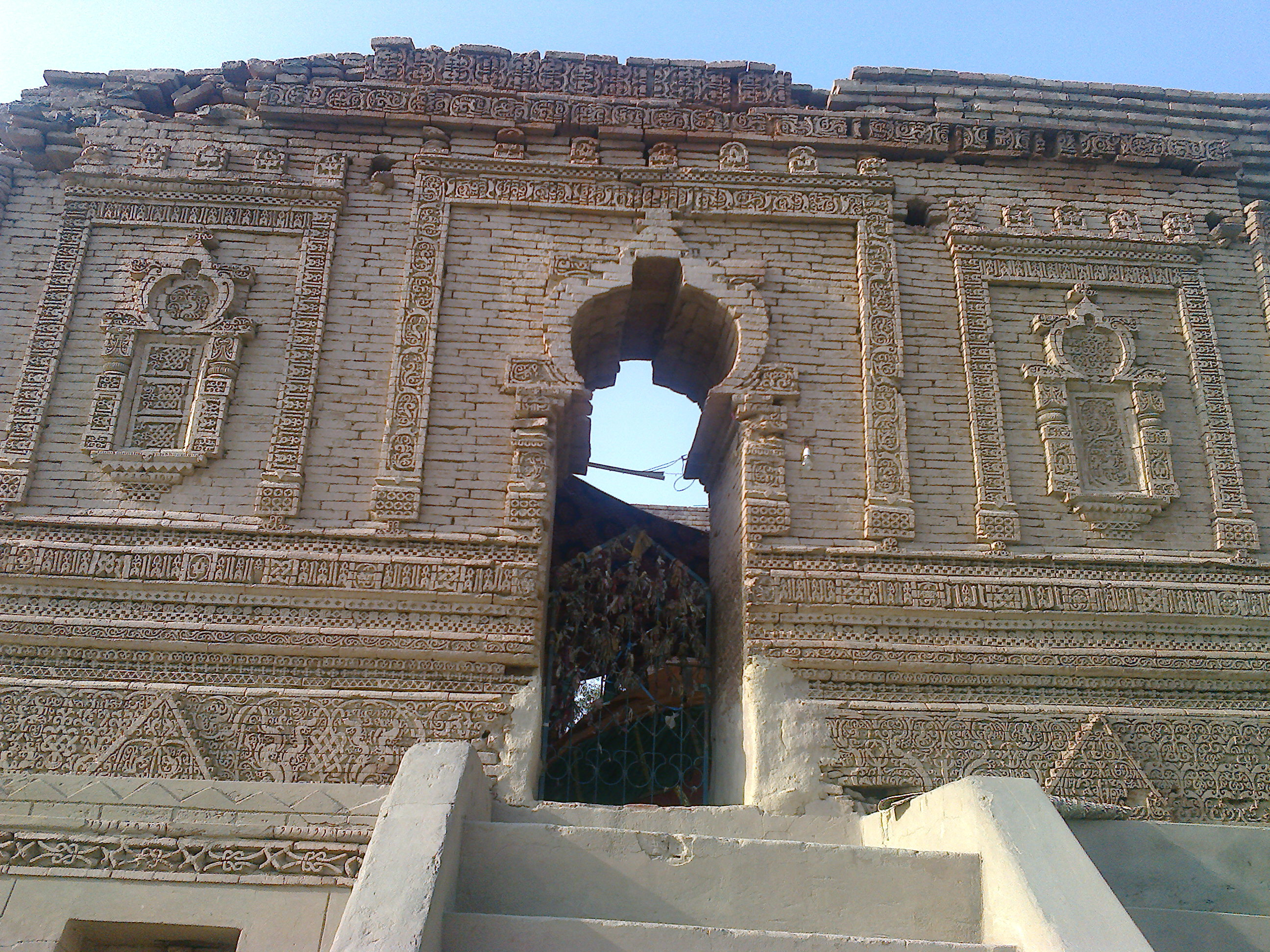
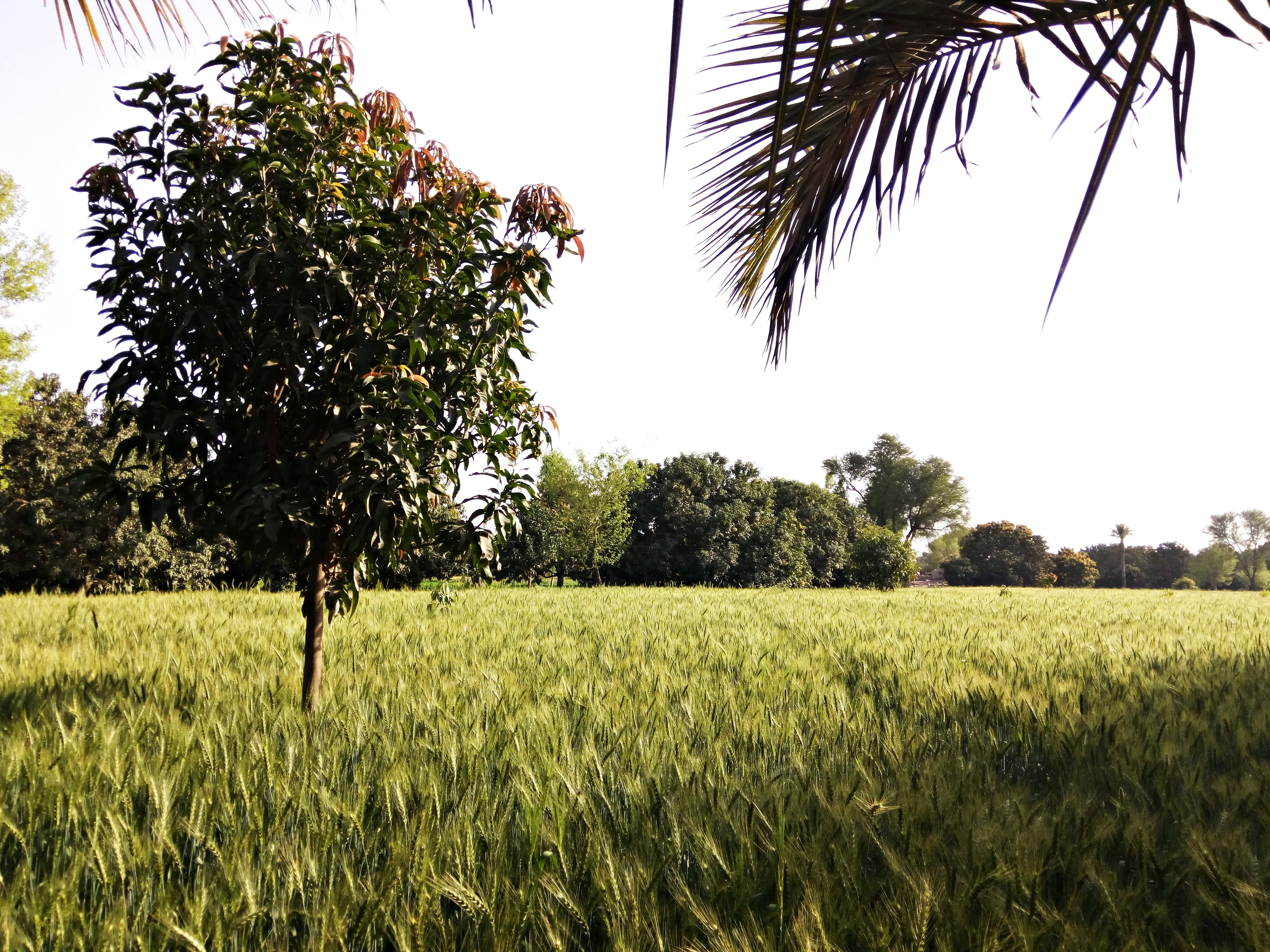
- Top: Tomb of Sheikh Sadan; Bottom: Fields in Muzaffargarh district

- District Government logo

- Map of Muzaffargarh District highlighted in red
- Coordinates: 30°4′10″N 71°11′39″E
- Country: Pakistan
- Province: (Punjab, Pakistan) Punjab
- Division: Dera Ghazi Khan
- Headquarters: Muzaffargarh

Government
  - Type: District Government
  - Deputy Commissioner: Mian Usman Ali
  - District Police Officer: Syed Hasnain Haider
  - District Health Officer: Allah Bux Khan

Area
  - District of Punjab: 4,778 km^{2} (1,845 sq mi)

Population (2023)
  - District of Punjab: 3,528,567
  - Density: 738.5/km^{2} (1,913/sq mi)
  - Urban: 662,975 (18.79%)
  - Rural: 2,865,592 (81.21%)

Literacy
  - Literacy rate: Total: (43.74%); Male: (51.38%); Female: (35.74%)
- Time zone: UTC+5 (PST)
- Number of Tehsils: 3
- Website: muzaffargarh.punjab.gov.pk

Muzaffargarh District (Note: Urdu: ضِلع مُظفّرگڑھ) is a district of the Punjab province of Pakistan. Its capital is Muzaffargarh city. It lies on the bank of the Chenab River.

== Geography and climate ==
Muzaffargarh

Climate chart (precipitation, max. and min. temperature)
J	F	M	A	M	J	J	A	S	O	N	D
7.2 21 5	9.5 23 8	20 29 14	23 36 20	60 40 24	92 42 29	131 39 29	73 38 28	41 37 25	1.7 35 18	2.3 29 11	6.9 23 6
- █ Average max. and min. temperatures in °C
- █ Precipitation totals in mm
- Source: World Meteorological Organization
Imperial conversion
J	F	M	A	M	J	J	A	S	O	N	D
0.3 70 40	0.4 74 46	0.8 83 56	0.9 96 67	2.4 105 76	3.6 108 83	5.2 103 84	2.9 100 82	1.6 99 77	0.1 94 65	0.1 83 52	0.3 73 42
- █ Average max. and min. temperatures in °F
- █ Precipitation totals in inches

Muzaffargarh spreads over an area of 8,249 km2 and forms a strip between the Chenab River on its east and Indus River on its west, which pass along the Eastern and Western boundaries respectively of the district and a triangle at Alipur tehsil of the district. The district is bounded on the north by district Layyah, on the south by Bahawalpur and Rahimyar Khan districts across the river Chenab.

Districts Multan and Khanewal are on the eastern side of district Muzaffargarh, across the river Chenab. District Jhang touches it on the northeast. Dera Gahzi Khan and Rajanpur districts lie on the western side across the river Indus. It is one of oldest districts of Punjab. According to the 1998 census of Pakistan, the population of the district was 2,635,903, of which 12.75% were urban. Muzaffargarh is one of oldest established districts of Punjab.

2010 floods

Muzaffargarh was especially hard hit by the 2010 Pakistan floods, given its position between the Chenab and Indus rivers It is spread over an area of 8,249 km^{2}. Muzaffargarh District lies in the strip between the rivers Chenab and Indus.

The city of Muzaffargarh is located in south-west of Punjab province at almost the exact centre of Pakistan. The closest major city is Multan. The area around the city is a flat, alluvial plain and is ideal for agriculture, with many citrus and mango farms. There are many canals that cut across the Muzaffargarh District providing water from nearby farms. This makes the land very fertile. However usually land close to the Chenab are usually flooded in the monsoon season.

Climate

Muzaffargarh features a semi arid climate with very hot summers and mild winters. The city witnesses some of the most extreme weather in the country. The highest recorded temperature is approximately 54 °C (129 °F), and the lowest recorded temperature is approximately −1 °C (30 °F). The average rainfall is roughly 427 millimetres (16.8 in). Dust storms are a common occurrence within the city.

The district's towns include Basti Malik Wala, Taliri, Mauza Bahadur Dawana, Dawana Bahadur Peer Rajan Bukhsh, Khangarh and Hayat Nagar.

== History ==
Muzaffargarh (lit. 'Fort of Muzaffar') was founded by the Saddozai Nawab of Multan, Muzaffar Khan Sadozai, in 1794. Muzaffargarh district was annexed by the British from its former Sikh rulers after the Second Anglo-Sikh War of 1848–1849. In 1861 it became a separate Muzaffargarh District. After the independence of Pakistan in 1947, the minority Hindus and Sikhs migrated to India while the Muslim refugees from India settled in the Muzaffargarh District. Muslim refugees from East Punjab, Haryana, Jammu and Kashmir started arriving and crossed the border into Pakistan; many were given land in Muzaffargarh District to settle.

== Administration ==
The district is administratively divided into the following three tehsils (subdivisions), which contain a total of 93 Union Councils:

Tehsil	Area (km²)	Pop. (2023)	Density (ppl/km²) (2023)	Literacy rate (2023)	Union Councils
Alipur	1,391	760,526	546.75	39.15%	14
Jatoi	1,010	862,046	853.51	40.67%	16
Muzaffargarh	2,377	1,905,995	801.85	46.84%	35
Total	4,778	3,528,567	738.50	43.74%	65

== Demographics ==
=== Population ===
Historical population
Year	Pop.	±% p.a.
1951	446,038	—
1961	532,015	+1.78%
1972	756,221	+3.25%
1981	1,048,243	+3.69%
1998	1,827,465	+3.32%
2017	2,981,048	+2.61%
2023	3,528,567	+2.85%

As of the 2023 census, present Muzaffargarh district has 552,926 households and a population of 3,528,567. The district has a sex ratio of 104.18 males to 100 females and a literacy rate of 43.74%: 51.38% for males and 35.74% for females. 1,185,064 (33.60% of the surveyed population) are under 10 years of age. 662,975 (18.79%) live in urban areas.

=== Religion ===
Religion in contemporary Muzaffargarh District
Religious group	1941		2017		2023	
Religious group	Pop.	%	Pop.	%	Pop.	%
Islam	360,868	86.29%	2,977,231	99.87%	3,515,344	99.68%
Hinduism (Note: 1931-1941: Including Ad-Dharmis)	53,458	12.78%	332	0.01%	288	0.01%
Sikhism	3,280	0.78%	—N/a	—N/a	65	~0%
Christianity	162	0.04%	2,565	0.09%	10,122	0.29%
Ahmadi	—N/a	—N/a	845	0.03%	734	0.02%
Others	426	0.1%	75	~0%	89	~0%
Total Population	418,194	100%	2,981,048	100%	3,526,642	100%
Note: 1941 census data is for Muzaffargarh and Alipur tehsils of erstwhile Muzaffargarh District, which roughly corresponds to contemporary Muzaffargarh district. District and tehsil borders have changed since 1941.

Religious groups in Muzaffargarh District (British Punjab province era)
Religious group	1881		1891		1901		1911		1921		1931		1941	
Religious group	Pop.	%	Pop.	%	Pop.	%	Pop.	%	Pop.	%	Pop.	%	Pop.	%
Islam	292,476	86.38%	327,727	86%	350,177	86.32%	494,915	86.91%	493,369	86.79%	513,265	86.79%	616,074	86.42%
Hinduism	43,297	12.79%	50,625	13.28%	52,221	12.87%	68,158	11.97%	69,878	12.29%	72,577	12.27%	90,643	12.72%
Sikhism	2,788	0.82%	2,715	0.71%	3,225	0.8%	6,322	1.11%	4,869	0.86%	5,287	0.89%	5,882	0.83%
Christianity	33	0.01%	27	0.01%	33	0.01%	60	0.01%	356	0.06%	246	0.04%	227	0.03%
Jainism	11	0%	1	0%	0	0%	1	0%	6	0%	0	0%	0	0%
Zoroastrianism	0	0%	0	0%	0	0%	4	0%	0	0%	0	0%	0	0%
Buddhism	0	0%	0	0%	0	0%	1	0%	0	0%	0	0%	23	0%
Judaism	—N/a	—N/a	0	0%	0	0%	0	0%	0	0%	0	0%	0	0%
Others	0	0%	0	0%	0	0%	0	0%	0	0%	0	0%	0	0%
Total population	338,605	100%	381,095	100%	405,656	100%	569,461	100%	568,478	100%	591,375	100%	712,849	100%
Note: British Punjab province era district borders are not an exact match in the present-day due to various bifurcations to district borders — which since created new districts — throughout the historic Punjab Province region during the post-independence era that have taken into account population increases.

Religion in the Tehsils of Muzaffargarh District (1921)
Tehsil	Islam		Hinduism		Sikhism		Christianity		Jainism		Others (Note: Including Buddhism, Zoroastrianism, Judaism, Tribals, others, or not stated)		Total	
Tehsil	Pop.	%	Pop.	%	Pop.	%	Pop.	%	Pop.	%	Pop.	%	Pop.	%
Muzaffargarh Tehsil	154,990	86.79%	22,629	12.67%	655	0.37%	300	0.17%	5	0%	0	0%	178,579	100%
Alipur Tehsil	126,350	86.12%	18,672	12.73%	1,681	1.15%	7	0%	1	0%	0	0%	146,711	100%
Sanawan Tehsil	96,325	88.4%	11,317	10.39%	1,279	1.17%	49	0.04%	0	0%	0	0%	108,970	100%
Leiah Tehsil	115,704	86.21%	17,260	12.86%	1,254	0.93%	0	0%	0	0%	0	0%	134,218	100%
Note: British Punjab province era tehsil borders are not an exact match in the present-day due to various bifurcations to tehsil borders — which since created new tehsils — throughout the historic Punjab Province region during the post-independence era that have taken into account population increases.

Religion in the Tehsils of Muzaffargarh District (1941)
Tehsil	Islam		Hinduism		Sikhism		Christianity		Jainism		Others (Note: Including Anglo-Indian Christians, British Christians, Buddhism, Zoroastrianism, Judaism, Tribals, others, or not stated)		Total	
Tehsil	Pop.	%	Pop.	%	Pop.	%	Pop.	%	Pop.	%	Pop.	%	Pop.	%
Muzaffargarh Tehsil	192,516	86.96%	27,714	12.52%	962	0.43%	161	0.07%	0	0%	23	0.01%	221,376	100%
Alipur Tehsil	168,352	85.54%	26,144	13.28%	2,318	1.18%	1	0%	0	0%	3	0%	196,818	100%
Kot Adu Tehsil	117,005	87.59%	14,803	11.08%	1,720	1.29%	52	0.04%	0	0%	5	0%	133,585	100%
Leiah Tehsil	138,201	85.8%	21,982	13.65%	882	0.55%	4	0%	0	0%	1	0%	161,070	100%
Note1: British Punjab province era tehsil borders are not an exact match in the present-day due to various bifurcations to tehsil borders — which since created new tehsils — throughout the historic Punjab Province during the post-independence era that have taken into account population increases. Note2: Tehsil religious breakdown figures for Christianity only includes local Christians, labeled as "Indian Christians" on census. Does not include Anglo-Indian Christians or British Christians, who were classified under "Other" category.

=== Language ===
Languages of Muzaffargarh district (2023)
1. Saraiki (93.40%)
2. Punjabi (3.65%)
3. Urdu (2.50%)
4. Others (0.45%)

At the time of the 2023 census, 93.40% of the population spoke Saraiki, 3.65% Urdu and 2.50% Punjabi as their first language.

=== Ethnicity ===
The most famous tribes and races are as under; Khar (offshoot of Kharal tribe), Khokhar, Dasti, Qureshi, Jatoi, Hinjra, Langrial, Thahim, Gopang, Bukhari, Gilani, Rajput, Jat and Arain. The major ethnic group are the Saraiki-speaking Jat forming the majority, with Saraiki-speaking Gujjar, Baloch, Rajputs and Pathan groups in minority.

== Education ==
Although Muzaffargarh is one of the oldest and largest districts of Pakistan by area and population, it still has only a single campus of Virtual University of Pakistan. The literacy rate is among the lowest in the country. District Muzaffargarh has a total of 1,072 male and 1,009 female public sector schools.

== Notable people ==
- Milkha Singh, Indian track and field athlete
- Dasti family, a political family
  - Abdul Hamid Khan Dasti
  - Jamshed Dasti
  - Amjad Hameed Khan Dasti
- Khar family, feudal lords and politicians
  - Ghulam Mustafa Khar
  - Ghulam Murtaza Raheem Khar
  - Ghulam Noor Rabbani Khar
  - Malik Ghulam Arbi Khar
  - Safina Saima Khar
