= Jamshed Dasti =

Pakistani politician (born 1972)

- جمشید دستی

Member of the National Assembly of Pakistan
- In office 3 June 2013 – 31 May 2018
- Constituency: NA-178 Muzaffargarh-III
- In office 4 June 2010 – 17 March 2013
- Constituency: NA-178 Muzaffargarh-III
- In office 23 April 2008 – 25 March 2010
- Constituency: NA-178 Muzaffargarh-III

Personal details
- Born: 15 February 1972 (age 54)
- Party: PTI (2023-present)
- Other political affiliations: Awami Raj Party (2016–2023); IND (2013–2018); PMLN (2013); PPP (2008–2012)

Jamshed Dasti (Urdu: جمشید دستی; born 15 February 1972) is a Pakistani politician who had been a member of the National Assembly of Pakistan between 2008 and 2018 and won elections in 2023 for the National Assembly of Pakistan from NA-175 as an independent candidate with the support of the PTI. He was disqualified by the Election Commission of Pakistan as a member of the National Assembly due to a fake degree on 15 July 2025.

== Early life ==
He was born on 15 February 1972.

== Political career ==
Dasti is known to have changed political parties frequently. He has been affiliated with the Pakistan People's Party (PPP), Pakistan Muslim League (N) and most recently in PTI.

He was elected to the National Assembly of Pakistan on a PPP ticket from NA-178 Muazaffargarh-III in the 2008 Pakistani general election.

In 2010, he resigned from the National Assembly for possessing a fake BA degree after which the Supreme Court of Pakistan ordered him to present his graduation degree.

He was re-elected to the National Assembly from Constituency NA-178 in a by-election held in 2010. In 2012, he quit PPP.

In April 2013 Dasti was sentenced to 3 years in prison and 5,000 Rupees fine for presenting a fake graduation degree during the 2008 election. Following the court verdict he was arrested from outside the courtroom. On foreseeing the court verdict he announced his decision of not contesting in the general elections of 2013 a day earlier the court announced the verdict.

On 10 April 2013, the Multan bench of Lahore High Court heard Dasti's appeal and overturned his conviction of 3 years and 5000 Rs fine hence paving the way for him to contest the elections. In 2013, he joined the PML (N).

He was re-elected to the National Assembly of Pakistan as an independent candidate from NA-177 Muazaffargarh-II and NA-178 Muazaffargarh-III in the 2013 Pakistani general election.

He formed his own party, the Awami Raj Party, in 2016.

In the 2018 Pakistani general election he ran from NA-182 Muzaffargarh-II, NA-184 Muzaffargarh-IV, and NA-185 Muzaffargarh-V as a candidate of the Awami Raj Party. He received 50,618, 40,390 votes, and 9,319 votes and lost to Mehr Irshad Ahmed Sial and Iftikhar Ahmed Khan Babar, both PPP candidates, and Syed Basit Sultan Bukhari, an independent, respectively.

On 22 March 2023, Dasti joined and merged his party with the Pakistan Tehreek-e-Insaf (PTI).

He contested the 2024 Pakistani general election from NA-175 Muzaffargarh-I as a PTI-backed independent candidate. He received 113,391 votes and defeated Mehr Irshad Ahmed Sial, a candidate of PPP. Election Commission of Pakistan disqualified him due to his fake degree on 15 July 2025. So his seat becomes vacant.

== Controversies ==
He was nominated as accused in a murder case in 2015.

In June 2017, Dasati was arrested while he was returning to Muzzafargarh from Islamabad, for allegedly opening a water canal forcibly in Muzzaffargarh, to irrigate the farming lands. His bail request was approved by an Anti-Terrorism Court a few days later.
