= Muzaffargarh =

Muzaffargarh مظفر گڑھ
- City
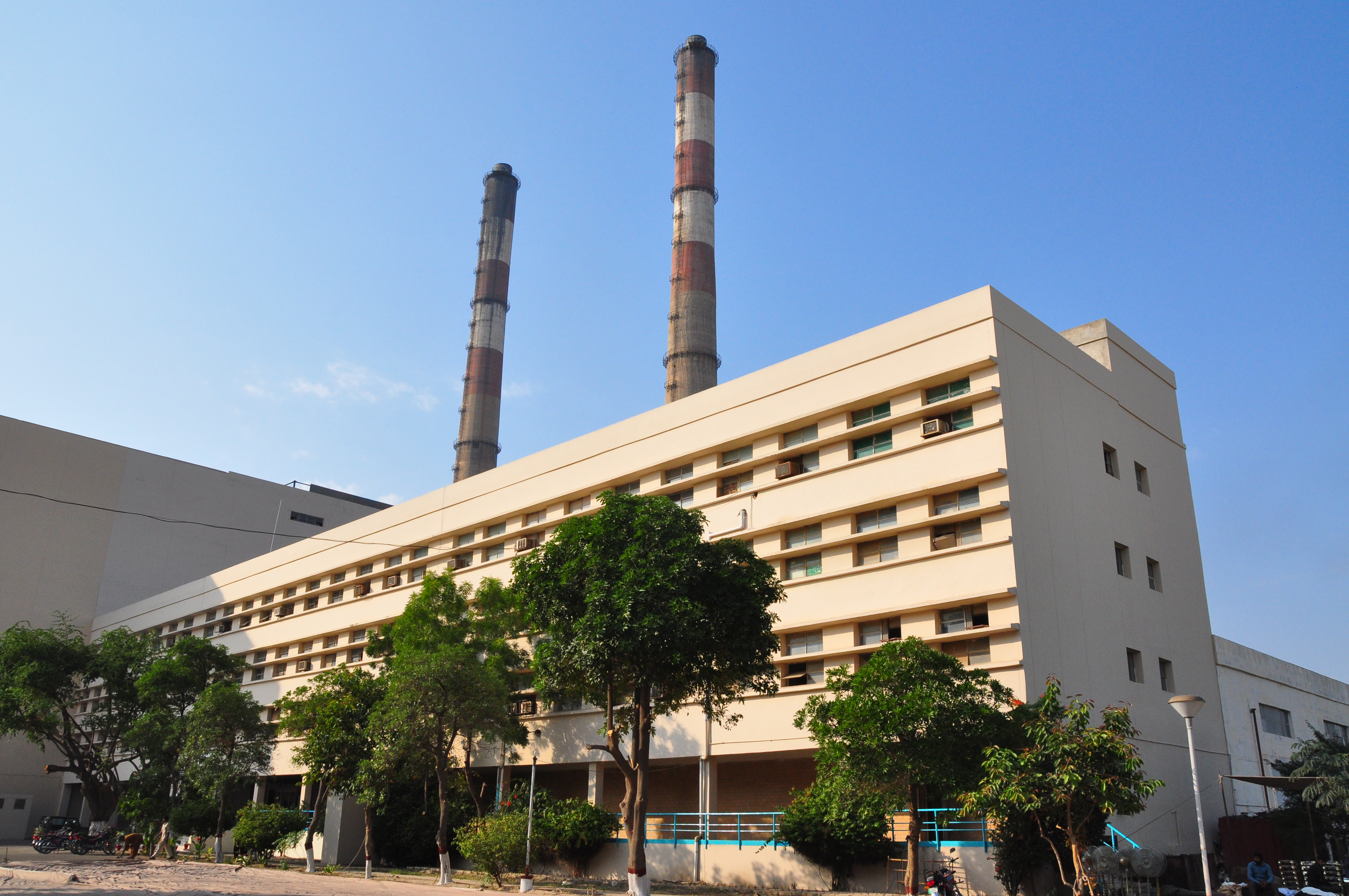
- Muzaffargarh Thermal Power Station

- Location Muzaffargarh (Pakistan)
- Coordinates: 30°04′27″N 71°11′26″E
- Country: Pakistan
- Province: Punjab
- Division: Dera Ghazi Khan
- District: Muzaffargarh
- Founder: Muzaffar Khan

Government
  - Type: Municipal Corporation
  - Mayor: N/A

Area
  - Metro: 8,435 km^{2} (3,257 sq mi)
- Elevation: 123 m (404 ft)

Population (2023 census)
  - City: 235,541
  - Rank: 41st in Pakistan
- Time zone: UTC+5 (PST)
  - Summer (DST): UTC+6 (PDT)
- Postal code: 24200
- Area code: 066

Muzaffargarh (Note: Urdu: مظفر گڑھ, lit. 'Fort of Muzaffar') is a city in Muzaffargarh District of the Punjab province of Pakistan. Located on the bank of the Chenab River, it is the capital of the Muzaffargarh District. It is the 41st most populous city of Pakistan.

== History ==
The Muzaffargarh region was an agricultural and forested area during the Indus Valley civilization. Then came the Vedic period, which was characterized by the introduction of Indo-Aryan culture into the Punjab province. Over time, several other civilizations came to power in the ancient town and surrounding district: the Kambojas, the Daradas, the Kekayas, the Madras, the Pauravas, the Yaudheyas, the Malavas and the Kurus.

After the fall of the Achaemenid Empire in 331 BCE, Alexander the Great marched into the present-day Punjab province with an army of 50,000 men. The Muzaffargarh region was, during different time periods, also ruled by the Maurya Empire, the Indo-Greek kingdom, the Kushan Empire, the Gupta Empire, the White Huns, the Kushano-Hephthalites, and the Turk and Hindu Shahi kingdoms.

In 997 CE, Sultan Mahmud Ghaznavi took over the Ghaznavid Empire, and in 1005, conquered the Shahis in Kabul, which granted him power over the Punjab region. The Delhi Sultanate and later the Mughal Empire also ruled the region. The location of the present-day town became predominantly Muslim during this time because of the arrival of missionary Sufis whose dargahs still persist in the area.

After the decline of the Mughal Empire, the Sikhs conquered the Muzaffargarh District. Later, in 1848, the British Raj assumed control of the area.

Foundation as a town

In 1794, the town of Muzaffargarh was founded by Muzaffar Khan Sadozai, who was the Durrani dynasty's governor of Multan at the time. The meaning of the word is "Fort of Muzaffar" because the "historic district" lies within the walls of a fort built by the governor. In 1864, it became the capital of the Muzaffargarh District.

The place was also referred to as Kala Pani (Black Water), as it is located between two rivers: the Indus and the Chenab. It was linked to the surrounding lands by bridges during the British era.

Independence 1947

During the independence movement of Pakistan, the Muslim population supported the Muslim League and the Pakistani Movement. In 1947, after Pakistan gained independence, the minority Hindus and Sikhs migrated to India while the Muslim refugees from India settled in Muzaffargarh.

== Demographics ==
Population

Historical population

Year	Pop.	±% p.a.
1951	11,271	—
1961	14,474	+2.53%
1972	24,736	+4.99%
1981	53,192	+8.88%

Year	Pop.	±% p.a.
1998	123,404	+5.07%
2017	209,604	+2.83%
2023	235,541	+1.96%

According to 2023 census, Muzaffargarh had a population of 235,541.

Languages

Languages of Muzaffargarh MC (2023)
1. Saraiki (73.1%)
2. Urdu (21.8%)
3. Punjabi (4.40%)
4. Others (1.10%)

== Geography and climate ==
Muzaffargarh

Climate chart (precipitation, max. and min. temperature)
J	F	M	A	M	J	J	A	S	O	N	D
7.2 21 5	9.5 23 8	20 29 14	13 36 20	9.8 40 24	52 42 29	101 39 29	73 38 28	31 37 25	1.7 35 18	2.3 29 11	6.9 23 6
- █ Average max. and min. temperatures in °C
- █ Precipitation totals in mm
- Source: World Meteorological Organization
Imperial conversion
J	F	M	A	M	J	J	A	S	O	N	D
0.3 70 40	0.4 74 46	0.8 83 56	0.5 96 67	0.4 105 76	2.1 108 83	4 103 84	2.9 100 82	1.2 99 77	0.1 94 65	0.1 83 52	0.3 73 42
- █ Average max. and min. temperatures in °F
- █ Precipitation totals in inches

Muzaffargarh spreads over an area of 8,249 km^{2} (3,185 sq mi) and forms a strip between the Chenab River to the east and Indus River to the west. Muzaffargarh is 123 metres (404 ft) above sea level. Muzaffargarh was hit especially hard by the 2010 Pakistan floods, given its position between the Chenab and Indus rivers. Muzaffargarh is located at almost the exact geographical center of Pakistan. The closest major city is Multan. The area around the city is a flat alluvial plain and is ideal for agriculture, with many citrus and mango farms. There are also canals that cut across the Muzaffargarh District, providing water to farms. During the monsoon season, the land close to the Chenab is usually flooded.

Climate

Muzaffargarh features a semi arid climate with very hot and humid summers and mild winters. The city has experienced some of the most extreme weather in Pakistan. The highest recorded temperature was approximately 54 °C (129 °F), and the lowest recorded temperature was approximately −1 °C (30 °F). The average rainfall is roughly 279 millimetres (11.0 in), concentrated during the monsoon. Dust storms are a common occurrence within the city.

== Cultural heritage sites ==
- Tomb of Tahir Khan Nahar
- Tomb of Sheikh Sadan Shaheed

== Transportation ==
Muzaffargarh has connections with other cities by several means of transportation.

=== Road ===
The town is linked to the rest of the district by paved roads that stretch for 983.69 km (611.24 mi). Buses to Multan leave frequently, because of their close proximity to each other. There are also buses that travel to more distant destinations. The N-70 National Highway connects the city to other parts of Pakistan. This highway allows for direct travel to, Islamabad, Faisalabad, Karachi, Lahore, and Bahawalpur.

=== Railways ===
Muzaffargarh is connected by rail with all parts of Pakistan, as it lies on the branch track between Multan, Mianwali, and Attock. The main Peshawar-Karachi railway line passes through Multan District.

=== Canals ===
There are two irrigation canals in Muzaffargarh named Muzaffargarh Canal and Ganesh Wah Canal.

The city is home to the Muzaffargarh Thermal Power Station, a major power generation facility owned and operated by Northern Power Generation Company Limited (GENCO-III). The plant has several oil-fired units that were commissioned in the 1990s.

Over the years, there have been numerous plans to modernize the facility, including proposals to convert the plant to run on coal to reduce costs. As part of a broader privatization effort, the government approved the sale of the power station in early 2025.

Additionally, in the mid-2010s, Muzaffargarh was selected as a potential site for a new nuclear power complex. However, recent strategic plans published by the Pakistan Atomic Energy Commission have focused on expanding existing nuclear sites at Chashma and Karachi, and the Muzaffargarh nuclear project is no longer mentioned in active government energy planning.

== Notable places ==
Fayyaz Park is situated in the center of the city, and located near Katchehry Chowk beside the National Bank Main City branch. The site of the park was previously the residence of the Deputy Commissioner. The park was named after ex-Deputy Commissioner Muzaffargarh Fayyaz Bashir. Recently, the park has been upgraded and made ready for families to walk and spend their time together.

Nawab Muzaffar Khan Park
- Taliri Park
- نواب مظفرخان پارک
- Interactive map of Nawab Muzaffar Khan Park
- Location: Muzaffargarh
- Coordinates: 30°03′53″N 71°12′41″E
- Area: 12.8 ha
- Status: Open / Active
- Parking: Yes

Nawab Muzaffar Khan Park is named after the founder of Muzaffargarh, Nawab Muzaffar Khan. It was formally known as Taliri Park, but was renamed in 2021 after Nawab Muzaffar Khan after historical research showed that he had planted exotic trees there upon his return from the Hajj. This park covers 12.8 ha.

== Notable people ==
- Muzaffar Khan Sadozai, founder of Muzaffargarh
- Sardar Kaure Khan Jatoi, leading personality for his social services
- Mushtaq Ahmed Gurmani, former governor of West Pakistan
- Abdul Hamid Khan Dasti, former Chief Minister of Punjab
- Nawabzada Nasrullah Khan, A prominent political figure in Pakistan
- Hina Rabbani Khar, former Foreign Minister
- Ghulam Mustafa Khar, former Governor and former Chief Minister of Punjab
- Ghulam Noor Rabbani Khar, politician
- Sultan Mehmood, politician
- Jamshed Dasti, politician
- Azhar Hussain, wrestler

== See also ==
- Politics of Muzaffargarh
