= NA-179 Kot Addu-I =

Constituency of the National Assembly of Pakistan

- Constituency for the National Assembly of Pakistan
- Region: Chowk Sarwar Shaheed Tehsil and Kot Addu Tehsil (partly) including Kot Addu city of Kot Addu District

Current constituency
- Created: 2018
- Party: Pakistan Tehreek-e-Insaf
- Member: Shabbir Ali Qureshi
- Created from: NA-176 (Muzaffargarh-I)

NA-179 Kot Addu-I (این اے-179، کوٹ ادو-1) is a constituency for the National Assembly of Pakistan. It mainly consists of the city of Kot Addu and the towns of Dera Din Panah and Chowk Sarwar Shaheed of Kot Addu District, areas which were previously in the old NA-176 before the 2018 delimitations.

== Election 2018 ==
General elections are scheduled to be held on 25 July 2018. Independent candidate Shabbir Ali Qureshi was elected to the National Assembly of Pakistan from this constituency.

General election 2018: NA-181 Muzaffargarh-I
Party	Candidate	Votes	%	±%
Independent	Shabbir Ali Qureshi	64,154	32.33	
Independent	Sultan Mehmood	54,484	27.46	
PTI	Ghulam Mustafa Khar	48,975	24.68	
PPP	Ihsan Ul Haq Ahsan	19,620	9.89	
Independent	Muhammad Ashraf Khan Rind	3,845	1.94	
Independent	Muhammad Sajjad Shahid	3,397	1.71	
AAT	Benazir Fatima	1,330	0.67	
Independent	Ahmad Yar	1,069	0.54	
Independent	Farooq Ur Rehman	753	0.38	
Independent	Khalida Perveen	616	0.31	
PNML	Iftikhar Ali	202	0.1	
Turnout		204,841	62.72	
Total valid votes		198,445	96.88	
Rejected ballots		6,396	3.12	
Majority		9,670	4.87	
Registered electors		326,617		

== Election 2024 ==
General elections were held on 8 February 2024. Shabbir Ali Qureshi won the election with 104,329 votes.

General election 2024: NA-179 Kot Addu-I
Party	Candidate	Votes	%	±%
PTI	Shabbir Ali Qureshi (Note: Filed nomination papers as PTI candidate but ECP allowed him to run as an Independent)	104,329	48.46	▲23.78
PML(N)	Malik Ghulam Qasim Hanjra	83,581	38.82	
TLP	Syed Muhammad Sarwar Shah	11,836	5.50	
Others	Others (twenty candidates)	15,538	7.22	
Turnout		221,998	57.46	▼5.26
Total valid votes		215,284	96.98	
Rejected ballots		6,714	3.02	
Majority		20,748	9.64	▲4.77
Registered electors		386,326		

== See also ==
- NA-178 Muzaffargarh-IV
- NA-180 Kot Addu-II
