= Dasti =

Dasti may refer to:

== People ==
- Abdul Hamid Khan Dasti (1918–2012), Pakistani politician
- Abdul Hayi Dasti (fl. from 2018), Pakistani politician
- Amjad Hameed Khan Dasti (1918–2012), Pakistani politician
- Jamshed Dasti (born 1978), Pakistani politician
- Tehmina Dasti (fl. from 2002), Pakistani politician

== Places ==
- Dasti, Iran, or Dashti
- Dashti County Iran
- Dashti, Hormozgan
