= PP-269 Muzaffargarh-II (2002–2018) =

Constituency of the Punjabi Provincial Legislature, Pakistan

- Former constituency for the Provincial Assembly of Punjab
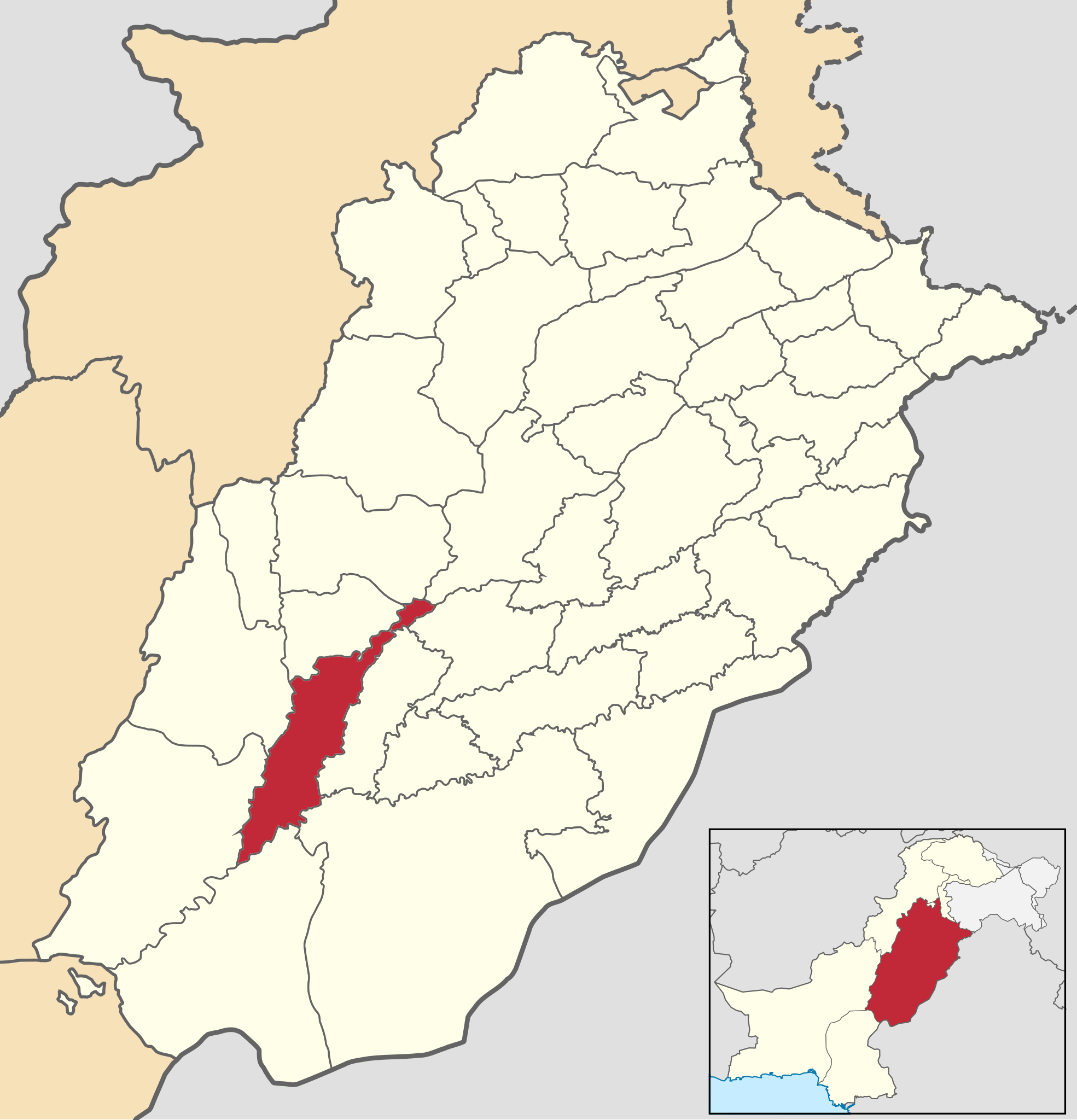
- Region: Kot Addu Tehsil (partly) and Muzaffargarh Tehsil (partly) in Muzaffargarh District

Former constituency
- Abolished: 2023
- Created from: PP-253 Muzaffargarh-III (2002-2018); PP-269 Muzaffargarh-II (2018-2023)
- Replaced by: PP-268 Muzaffargarh-I

PP-269 Muzaffargarh-II (پی پی-269، مظفرگڑھ-2) was a Constituency of Provincial Assembly of Punjab. It was abolished in 2023 after Muzaffargarh lost 1 seat after delimitations followed by 2023 Census.

== General elections 2018 ==
Provincial election 2018: PP-269 Muzaffargarh-II
Party	Candidate	Votes	%	±%
PML(N)	Azhar Abbas	28,310	27.28	
PTI	Ghulam Murtaza Raheem	24,035	23.16	
PPP	Mahar Irshad Ahmad Khan	19,357	18.65	
ARP	Nasir Abbas	17,123	16.50	
TLP	Mazhar Abbas	6,463	6.23	
Independent	Ghulam Muhammad khan	2,207	2.13	
MMA	Muhammad Afzal	1,618	1.56	
Independent	Allah Ditta	1,612	1.55	
Others	Others (nine candidates)	3,057	2.94	
Turnout		107,629	62.80	
Total valid votes		103,782	96.43	
Rejected ballots		3,847	3.57	
Majority		4,275	4.12	
Registered electors		171,385		

== General elections 2013 ==
Contesting candidates	Party affiliation	Votes polled

== General elections 2008 ==
Contesting candidates	Party affiliation	Votes polled

== See also ==
- PP-267 Rahim Yar Khan-XIII
- PP-269 Kot Addu-I
