= NA-177 (Muzaffargarh-II) =

Constituency of the National Assembly of Pakistan

Constituency NA-177 (Muzaffargarh-II)
- Former constituency for the National Assembly of Pakistan
- Region: Muzaffargarh District

Former constituency
- Created: 2002
- Abolished: 2018
- Replaced by: NA-181 (Muzaffargarh-I); NA-182 (Muzaffargarh-II); NA-183 (Muzaffargarh-III)

Constituency NA-177 (Muzaffargarh-II) (Urdu: این اے-۱۷۷، مُظفّرگڑھ-۲) is a constituency for the National Assembly of Pakistan. It comprised mainly areas of Muzaffargarh Tehsil and Kot Addu Tehsil. After the 2018 delimitations, this constituency, along with its neighboring NA-176, were broken up into three constituencies - NA-181, NA-182 (which also includes city of Muzaffargarh from old NA-178), and NA-183.

== Election 2002 ==
General elections were held on 10 October 2002. Hina Rabbani Khar of PML-Q won by 46,752 votes.

General election 2002: NA-177 Muzaffargarh-II
Party	Candidate	Votes	%	±%
PML(Q)	Hina Rabbani Khar	46,752	34.29	
Independent	Khalid Anmad Gurmani	46,409	34.04	
PPP	Rana Muhammad Naseem Akhtar	20,773	15.24	
Independent	Malik Muhammad Shahnawaz Khar	13,046	9.57	
PML(N)	Malik Muhammad Basit Khar	4,473	3.28	
MMA	Arshad Mehmood Leghari	3,530	2.59	
Independent	Malik Zahoor Hussain Haans	1,345	0.99	
Turnout		141,094	55.26	
Total valid votes		136,328	96.62	
Rejected ballots		4,766	3.38	
Majority		343	0.25	
Registered electors		255,321		

== Election 2008 ==
General elections were held on 18 February 2008. Hina Rabbani Khar of PPP won by 84,916 votes.

General election 2008: NA-177 Muzaffargarh-II
Party	Candidate	Votes	%	±%
PPP	Hina Rabbani Khar	84,916	60.02	
PML(Q)	Khalid Ahmad Gurmani	50,834	35.93	
PML(N)	Malik Muhammad Basit Khar	5,721	4.05	
Turnout		147,104	57.06	
Total valid votes		141,471	96.17	
Rejected ballots		5,633	3.83	
Majority		34,082	24.09	
Registered electors		257,818		

== Election 2013 ==
General elections were held on 11 May 2013.

General election 2013: NA-177 Muzaffargarh-II
Party	Candidate	Votes	%	±%
Independent	Jamshaid Ahmad Dasti	103,327	46.56	
PPP	Ghulam Rabani Khar	49,822	22.45	
PML(N)	Khalid Anmad Gurmani	22,719	10.24	
Independent	Malik Muhammad Rafique Khar	14,634	6.59	
PTI	Mian Zulfiqar Ali Qureshi	13,757	6.20	
MDM	Taj Muhammad Saqib	8,948	4.03	
Independent	Muhammad Ali Raza Khar	3,204	1.44	
Others	Others (twelve candidates)	5,508	2.49	
Turnout		230,060	64.44	
Total valid votes		221,919	96.46	
Rejected ballots		8,141	3.54	
Majority		53,505	24.11	
Registered electors		357,013		

== By-Election 2013 ==
Mr. Ghulam Rabbani Khar of PPP won the seat in By-election and became the member of National Assembly.

By-Election 2013: NA-177 Muzaffargarh-II
Party	Candidate	Votes	%	±%
PPP	Ghulam Rabani Khar	69,903	37.69	
Independent	Muhammad Javaid Khan Dasti	60,805	32.79	
Independent	Muhammad Saood Gurmani	31,130	16.79	
Independent	Muhammad Iqbal Khan Patafi	18,456	9.95	
PTI	Mian Shahid Mustafa Qureshi	2,269	1.22	
Others	Others (sixteen candidates)	2,885	1.56	
Turnout		189,568	53.10	
Total valid votes		185,448	97.83	
Rejected ballots		4,120	2.17	
Majority		9,098	4.90	
Registered electors		357,013		
