= PP-268 Muzaffargarh-I =

Constituency of the Punjabi Provincial Legislature, Pakistan

- Constituency for the Provincial Assembly of Punjab
- Region: Muzaffargarh Tehsil (partly) including Muzaffargarh city in Muzaffargarh District

Current constituency
- Created from: PP-254 Muzaffargarh-IV (2002-2018); PP-269 Muzaffargarh-II and PP-270 Muzaffargarh-III (2018-2023)

PP-268 Muzaffargarh-I (پی پی-268، مظفرگڑھ-1) is a Constituency of Provincial Assembly of Punjab.

== General elections 2024 ==
Provincial election 2024: PP-268 Muzaffargarh-I
Party	Candidate	Votes	%	±%
PML(N)	Muhammad Ajmal Khan	27,914	21.85	
Independent	Muhammad Younis (Note: Filed nomination papers as PTI candidate but ECP allowed him to run as an Independent)	26,562	20.79	
PPP	Mahar Abdul Hussain Taragar	21,858	17.11	
IPP	Abdul Hayi Dasti	18,335	14.35	
Independent	Nasir Abbas	12,836	10.05	
TLP	Munir Ahmad Khan Bhutta	5,956	4.66	
JUI (F)	Mehboob Ur Rehman	3,825	2.99	
Independent	Muhammad Usman Farooq	2,754	2.16	
Others	Others (twenty three candidates)	7,708	6.04	
Turnout		136,032	55.71	
Total valid votes		127,748	93.91	
Rejected ballots		8,284	6.09	
Majority		1,352	1.06	
Registered electors		244,189		
hold				

== General elections 2018 ==
Provincial election 2018: PP-270 Muzaffargarh-III
Party	Candidate	Votes	%	±%
Independent	Abdul Hayi Dasti	17,717	18.88	
ARP	Muhammad Ajmal Khan	17,700	18.87	
PML(N)	Hammad Nawaz Khan	16,375	17.45	
PPP	Ezan Shah	14,419	15.37	
PTI	Mehnaz Saeed	10,258	10.93	
Independent	Muti Ur Rahman	7,632	8.14	
Independent	Sohail Alam	3,048	3.25	
MMA	Umar Daraz	2,397	2.56	
TLP	Sheikh Nawazish Hussain	1,494	1.59	
Independent	Usman Haider	1,012	1.08	
Others	Others (sixteen candidates)	1,767	1.88	
Turnout		96,570	59.15	
Total valid votes		93,819	97.15	
Rejected ballots		2,751	2.85	
Majority		17	0.01	
Registered electors		163,268		

== General elections 2013 ==
2013 By-elections: PP-254 Muzaffargarh-IV
Party	Candidate	Votes	%	±%
PML(N)	Hammad Nawaz Khan	23,182	31.84	
PTI	Abdul Haye Dasti	17,063	23.43	
PPP	Irshad Ahmed Khan	16,602	22.80	
Independent	Nasir Abbas	13,305	18.27	
Independent	Muhammad Hussain Munna	1,221	1.68	
Others	Others (twenty one candidates)	1,444	1.98	
Turnout		74,362	43.76	
Total valid votes		72,817	97.92	
Rejected ballots		1,545	2.08	
Majority		6,119	8.41	
Registered electors		169,942		

== General elections 2008 ==
Contesting candidates	Party affiliation	Votes polled
Hammad Nawaz Khan	Pakistan Muslim League (N)	

== See also ==
- PP-267 Rahim Yar Khan-XIII
- PP-269 Muzaffargarh-II
