= NA-176 Muzaffargarh-II =

Constituency of the National Assembly of Pakistan

- Constituency for the National Assembly of Pakistan
- Region: Muzaffargarh Tehsil (partly) of Muzaffargarh District
- Electorate: 446,099

Current constituency
- Created: 2018
- Party: Pakistan People's Party
- Member: Iftikhar Ahmed Khan Babar
- Created from: NA-176 (Muzaffargarh-I); NA-178 (Muzaffargarh-III)

NA-176 Muzaffargarh-II (این اے-176، مُظفّرگڑھ-2) is a constituency for the National Assembly of Pakistan.

== Election 2018 ==
General elections are scheduled to be held on 25 July 2018.

General election 2018: NA-184 Muzaffargarh-IV
Party	Candidate	Votes	%	±%
PPP	Iftikhar Ahmed Khan Babar	54,879	27.59	
Independent	Malik Ahmad Karim Qaswar Langrial	41,753	20.99	
ARP	Jamshed Dasti	40,390	20.30	
PTI	Sayeda Zahra Basit Bukhari	35,086	17.64	
TLP	Ghulam Abbas	11,523	5.79	
PML(N)	Syed Haroon Ahmed Sultan Bokhari	5,735	2.88	
Amun Taraqqi Party	Malik Anayat Ullah Khokhar	1,790	0.90	
MMA	Muhammad Shahid	1,683	0.85	
Independent	Syed Basit Sultan Bukhari	1,346	0.68	
TLI	Azeem Qamar	1,167	0.59	
Independent	Amjad Ali	1,103	0.55	
Independent	Muhammad Aoon Hamid	878	0.44	
Independent	Mohammad Ghayoor	853	0.43	
Independent	Nawabzada Bilal Ahmed Khan	395	0.20	
Independent	Nawabzada Mansoor Ahmed Khan	354	0.18	
Turnout		208,315	58.64	
Total valid votes		198,935	95.50	
Rejected ballots		9,380	4.50	
Majority		13,126	6.60	
Registered electors		355,241		

== Election 2024 ==
General elections were held on 8 February 2024. Iftikhar Ahmed Khan Babar won the election with 53,944 votes.

General election 2024: NA-176 Muzaffargarh-II
Party	Candidate	Votes	%	±%
PPP	Iftikhar Ahmed Khan Babar	53,944	23.64	▼3.95
PML(N)	Syed Basit Sultan Bukhari	43,711	19.15	▲16.27
Independent	Nazia Dasti	35,475	15.55	
Independent	Malik Ahmad Karim Qaswar Langrial	32,246	14.13	▼6.86
PTI	Nawabzada Ahmed Khan Babar (Note: Filed nomination papers as PTI candidate but ECP allowed him to run as an Independent)	31,130	13.64	▼4.00
Others	Others (sixteen candidates)	31,698	14.14	
Turnout		237,784	53.30	▼5.34
Total valid votes		224,208	94.29	
Rejected ballots		9,580	5.71	
Majority		10,233	4.48	▼2.12
Registered electors		446,099		
PPP hold				

== See also ==
- NA-175 Muzaffargarh-I
- NA-177 Muzaffargarh-III
