= Pakistan Democratic Party =

Political party in Pakistan

Pakistan Democratic Party پاکستان جمہوری پارٹی
- Abbreviation: PDP
- Chairman: Nawabzada Mansoor Ahmed Khan
- Secretary-General: Nawaz Gondal
- Vice President: Basharat Mirza
- Senior Leader: Arshad Chaudhary
- Founder: Nawabzada Nasrullah Khan
- Founded: June 1967
- Dissolved: 2012
- Merged into: Pakistan Tehreek-e-Insaf
- National affiliation: ARD

Election symbol
- Umbrella

The Pakistan Democratic Party (PDP) was a political party in Pakistan, founded by Nawabzada Nasrullah Khan in June 1967. Nawbzada Nasrullah Khan led the party until his death in 2003. After Nawab's death, the party's leadership was later taken by his son Nawabzada Mansoor Ahmed Khan; the party later merged with Imran Khan's Pakistan Tehreek-e-Insaf in 2012. It was a major rival during Pakistan's former president, Pervez Musharraf's presidency due to its affiliation with Alliance for Restoration of Democracy (ARD) led by its chief Nawbzada Nasrullah Khan along with PML-N and PPP which was created to campaign for Pakistan’s return to civilian rule after the 1999 military coup led by General Musharraf and was reported to include over a dozen political parties.

== Electoral history ==
At the legislative elections held on 20 October 2002, the party won 0.29% of the popular vote.

=== National Assembly elections ===
National Assembly
Election	Votes	%	Seats	+/–
1970	737,958	2.24%	1 / 313	▲1
1988	80,473	0.40%	1 / 237	▲1
1990	51,645	0.24%	0 / 237	▼1
1997	47,153	0.24%	0 / 237	Steady
2002	83,976	0.29%	0 / 342	Steady
2008	64, 505	0.19%	0 / 342	Steady

== Leadership ==
- Muhammad Arshad Chaudhry
- Nawaz Gondal, secretary general
- Nawabzada Mansoor Ahmed Khan, chairman of the party
- Basharat Mirza, vice-president
- Asghar Khan, Chairman of the Manifesto Committee (1969-70)
