= Chowk Sarwar Shaheed =

Chowk Sarwar Shaheed چوک سرور شہید
- Town
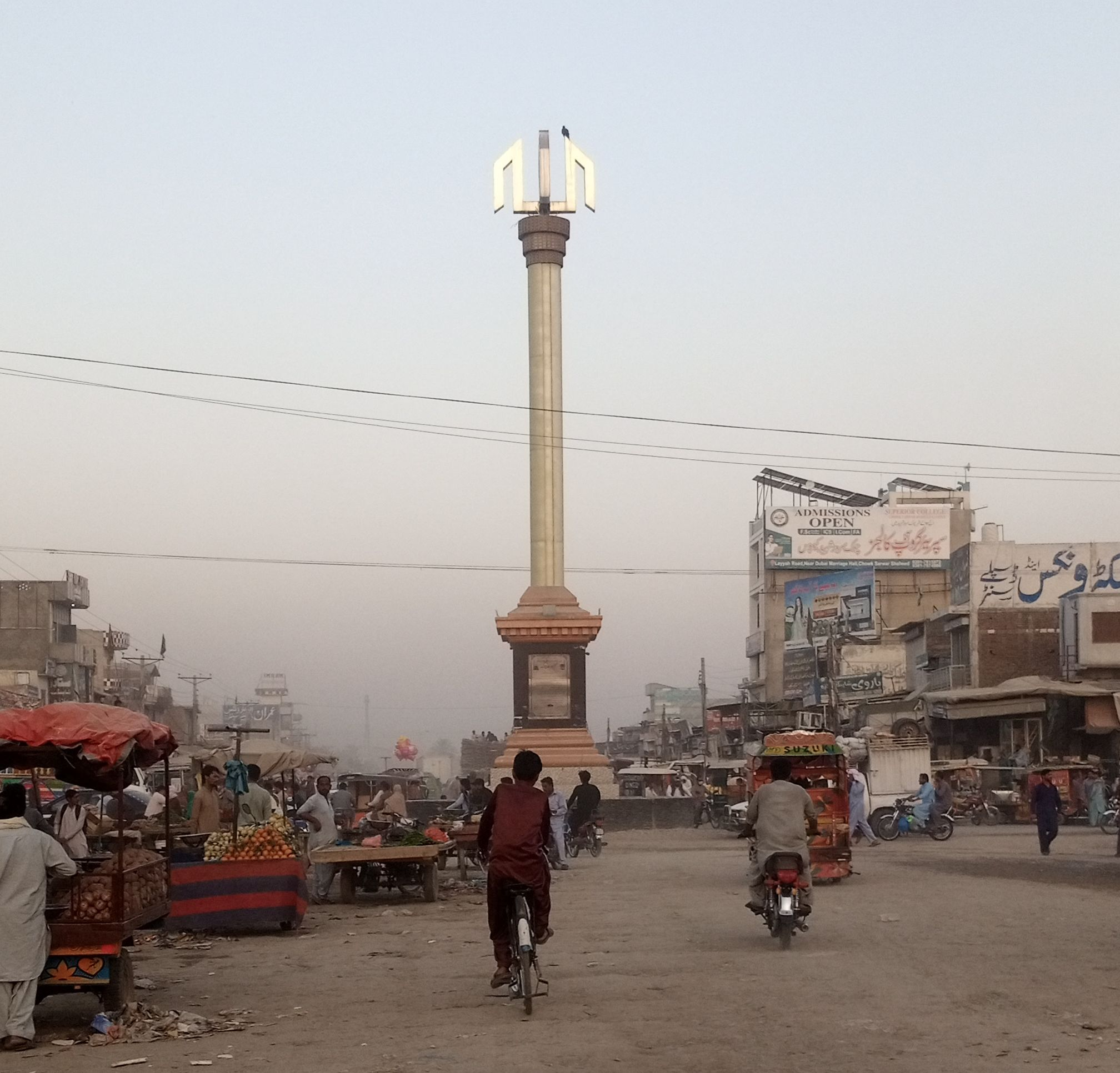
- Chowk Sarwar

- Location in Pakistan Chowk Sarwar Shaheed (Pakistan)
- Coordinates: 30.5808929°N 71.2356828°E
- Country: Pakistan
- Province: (Punjab, Pakistan) Punjab
- District: Kot Addu
- Towns: 1
- Union councils: -

Population (2023)
  - Total: 63,421
- Time zone: UTC+5 (PST)
  - Summer (DST): UTC+6 (PDT)
- Postal code: 34030
- Area code: 66
- Website: http://tehsilchowkmunda.blogspot.com

Chowk Sarwar Shaheed (Urdu: چوک سرور شہید), previously known as Chowk Munda, is a town and headquarter of Chowk Sarwar Shaheed Tehsil, in Kot Addu District of Punjab, Pakistan.

== History ==
=== Beginning ===
This region was once a deserted place with a very small human populace. The inhabitants survived on wild fruits and animals. However, with the introduction of a canal system, the area has become well-settled. In the past, there were no crows to be seen here, but now, the area has bloomed into gardens where birds are chirping, and the human population is also increasing.

=== Location ===
Chowk Azam is situated about forty kilometers to the north of this city, and Muzaffargarh District is located about seventy kilometers to the south. Additionally, the city Rangpur is located thirty kilometers away to the east, which is the same region mentioned by Syed Waris Shah in his book, Heer. On the western side, thirty kilometers away, lies an old city called Daira Deen Panah. This town has a unique historical position due to its location almost in the middle of these four cities.

=== During Mughal rule ===
During the Mughal era, forts and outposts were constructed throughout the country for defensive purposes. In this town, a fort was also erected, but due to the passage of time, only remnants of it remain today on the west side of the city and the south side of the middle school. The surrounding area was waterless at that time.

=== Hindu rule ===
In 1840, a Hindu ruler named Dewan Sawan mal had the opportunity to govern this region for about nine years, until 1849.

=== British rule ===
When the British colonized India, they introduced new reforms and administered the system in this area as well.

=== Name ===
This town, previously known as Chowk Munda, was often the subject of ridicule due to its seemingly arbitrary name. The city of Khuni Chowk, located to the north, was renamed to Chowk Azam. The people living in the city had a strong desire for a more meaningful name for their city, as they felt embarrassed when visiting relatives in other areas. Someone asked about munda, which means "baby" in Punjabi, and wondered if he was still young.

In 1983, during the time of General Zia-ul-Haq, the DC of Muzaffargarh suggested renaming the town to Chowk Sarwar Shaheed, which was liked by the people. The name honored Captain Sarwar Shaheed the first son of Pakistan to be martyred on the Kashmir front in 1948. The government awarded him the country's highest honor Nishan e Haider in recognition of his services. The people were pleased with the new name, which honored a martyr, and thus Chowk Munda became Chowk Sarwar Shaheed.

== Demographics ==
=== Population ===
Historical population
Year	Pop.	±% p.a.
1951	...	—
1961	...	—
1972	...	—
1981	...	—
1998	26,355	—
2017	56,117	+4.06%
2023	63,421	+2.06%

As of the 2023 census, Chowk Sarwar Shaheed has population of 63,421.

Languages

Languages of Chowk Sarwar Shaheed city (2023 Census)
1. Punjabi (68.5%)
2. Saraiki (22.7%)
3. Pashto (5.20%)
4. Urdu (2.70%)
5. Others (0.90%)
