= Malik Ghulam Qasim Hanjra =

Pakistani politician

Member of the Provincial Assembly of the Punjab
- In office 15 August 2018 – 14 January 2023
- Constituency: PP-268 Muzaffargarh-I

Personal details
- Party: PMLN
- Relatives: Malik Ahmad Yar Hunjra (brother); Sultan Mehmood Hanjra (uncle)

Malik Ghulam Qasim Hanjra is a Pakistani politician who had been a member of the Provincial Assembly of the Punjab from August 2018 till January 2023.

== Political career ==
He was elected to the Provincial Assembly of the Punjab as a candidate of Pakistan Muslim League (N) from Constituency PP-268 (Muzaffargarh-I) in the 2018 Pakistani general election. He has been Chairman of Municipal Committee Dera Din Panah (2015 to 2018).

He is brother of Malik Ahmad Yar Hunjra (Former minister in Punjab). His uncle Malik Sultan Mehmood Hanjra (former MNA) is a well known politician.
