= NA-180 Kot Addu-II =

Constituency of the National Assembly of Pakistan

- Constituency for the National Assembly of Pakistan
- Region: Kot Addu Tehsil (partly) including Sanawan Town of Kot Addu District

Current constituency
- Created: 2018
- Party: Pakistan Tehreek-e-Insaf
- Member: Mian Fayyaz Hussain Chhajrra
- Created from: NA-177 (Muzaffargarh-II)

NA-180 Kot Addu-II (این اے-180، کوٹ ادو-2) is a newly-created constituency for the National Assembly of Pakistan. It mainly consists of Kot Addu Tehsil of Kot Addu District.

== Area ==
- Rung Pur
- Muradabad
- Sanawan
- Gujrat
- Mehmood Kot

== Election 2018 ==
General elections were held on 25 July 2018.

General election 2018: NA-183 Muzaffargarh-III
Party	Candidate	Votes	%	±%
PPP	Raza Rabbani Khar	54,960	26.86	
Independent	Mian Fayyaz Hussain Chhajrra	39,962	19.53	
PTI	Malik Muhammad Rafeeq Khar	36,439	17.81	
TLP	Allah Bachaya	35,174	17.19	
Independent	Tariq Ahmad Gormani	16,677	8.15	
Independent	Zulfiqar Ali Dasti	8,031	3.92	
PML(N)	Muhammad Arif Khan Baloch	3,067	1.50	
Independent	Husnain Raza	2,560	1.25	
Independent	Imtiaz Hussain	2,153	1.05	
Independent	Sadam Hussain	1,494	0.73	
Independent	Muhammad Ali Raza Khar	1,220	0.60	
MMA	Arshad lqbal	996	0.49	
Independent	Amjad Noor Muhammad Khan	901	0.44	
Independent	Muhammad Saud	476	0.23	
Independent	Muhammad Zeeshan Gurmani	370	0.18	
Independent	Sajid Mehmood Ashraf	147	0.07	
Turnout		212,319	63.32	
Total valid votes		204,627	96.38	
Rejected ballots		7,692	3.62	
Majority		14,998	7.33	
Registered electors		335,326		

== Election 2024 ==
General elections were held on 8 February 2024. Mian Fayyaz Hussain Chhajrra won the election with 96,275 votes.

General election 2024: NA-180 Kot Addu-II
Party	Candidate	Votes	%	±%
PTI	Mian Fayyaz Hussain Chhajrra (Note: Filed nomination papers as PTI candidate but ECP allowed him to run as an Independent)	96,275	48.42	▲30.61
PPP	Raza Rabbani Khar	49,515	24.90	▼1.96
TLP	Allah Bachaya	18,960	9.54	▼7.65
PML(N)	Abdul Khaliq Khar	15,648	7.87	▲6.37
Others	Others (twenty-three candidates)	18,420	9.26	
Turnout		205,646	51.93	▼11.39
Total valid votes		198,818	96.68	
Rejected ballots		6,828	3.32	
Majority		46,760	23.52	
Registered electors		396,000		

== See also ==
- NA-179 Kot Addu-I
- NA-181 Layyah-I
