= Mian Fayyaz Hussain Chhajrra =

Member of the National Assembly of Pakistan from Kot Addu (2024–2029)

- میاں فیاض حسین چھجڑا

Member of the National Assembly of Pakistan
- Incumbent
- Assumed office 29 February 2024
- Constituency: NA-180 Kot Addu-II

Personal details
- Party: PTI (2024-present)

Mian Fayyaz Hussain Chhajrra (Urdu: میاں فیاض حسین چھجڑا) is a Pakistani politician who has been a member of the National Assembly of Pakistan since February 2024.

== Political career ==
Chhajrra contested the 2018 Pakistani general election from NA-183 Muzaffargarh-III as an independent candidate, but was unsuccessful. He received 39,962 votes and was defeated by Raza Rabbani Khar, a candidate of Pakistan People's Party (PPP).

He won the 2024 Pakistani general election from NA-180 Kot Addu-II as an independent candidate endorsed by the Pakistan Tehreek-e-Insaf (PTI). He received 96,275 votes while runner up Raza Rabbani Khar, a candidate of PPP, received 49,515 votes.
