= NA-175 Muzaffargarh-I =

Constituency of the National Assembly of Pakistan

- Constituency for the National Assembly of Pakistan
- Region: Muzaffargarh Tehsil (partly) including Muzaffargarh city of Muzaffargarh District
- Electorate: 461,054

Current constituency
- Created: 2018
- Member: Vacant
- Created from: NA-176 (Muzaffargarh-I); NA-177 Muzaffargarh-II; NA-178 (Muzaffargarh-III)

NA-175 Muzaffargarh-I (این اے-175، مُظفّرگڑھ-1) is a newly created constituency for the National Assembly of Pakistan. It mainly consists of the city of Muzaffargarh along with a majority of the areas of Muzaffargarh Tehsil.

== Area ==
- Muzaffargarh City
- Basira
- karamdad Qureshi

== Election 2018 ==
General elections were held on 25 July 2018.

General election 2018: NA-182 Muzaffargarh-II
Party	Candidate	Votes	%	±%
PPP	Mehr Irshad Ahmed Sial	53,094	26.84	
ARP	Jamshed Dasti	50,618	25.59	
PML(N)	Hammad Nawaz Khan	47,676	24.1	
PTI	Tehmina Dasti	33,942	17.16	
TLP	Syed Chiragh All Gilani	6,620	3.35	
Independent	Amaan Ullah	1,238	0.63	
Independent	Muhammad Hussain	1,139	0.58	
Independent	Rana Mushtaq Ahmad	954	0.48	
Independent	Muhammad Yousaf	861	0.44	
Independent	Muhammad Yaseen	690	0.35	
Independent	Imtiaz Hussain	267	0.14	
Independent	Mehnaz Saeed	259	0.13	
Independent	Nawab Zada Muhammad Ahmed Khan Babar	167	0.08	
Independent	Muhammad Naeem Akhtar	158	0.08	
Independent	Qayoom Nawaz Khan	78	0.04	
Independent	Sardar Khasif Fareed Khan	73	0.04	
Turnout		204,324	61.06	
Total valid votes		197,834	96.82	
Rejected ballots		6,490	3.18	
Majority		2,476	1.25	
Registered electors		334,653		

== Election 2024 ==
General elections were held on 8 February 2024. Jamshed Dasti won the election with 113,391 votes.

General election 2024: NA-175 Muzaffargarh-I
Party	Candidate	Votes	%	±%
PTI	Jamshed Dasti (Note: Filed nomination papers as PTI candidate but ECP allowed him to run as an Independent)	113,391	42.47	▲25.31
PPP	Mehr Irshad Ahmed Sial	72,058	26.99	▲0.15
PML(N)	Hammad Nawaz Khan	47,426	17.76	▼6.34
Others	Others (twenty-four candidates)	34,102	12.77	
Turnout		277,221	60.13	▼0.93
Total valid votes		266,977	96.30	
Rejected ballots		10,244	3.70	
Majority		41,333	15.48	
Registered electors		461,054		

== See also ==
- NA-174 Rahim Yar Khan-VI
- NA-176 Muzaffargarh-II
