= Uday Bhanu Hans =

Hindi poet (1926–2019)

Uday Bhanu
- Born: 2 August 1926; Daira Din Panah, Muzaffargarh, Punjab, Pakistan
- Died: 26 February 2019 (aged 92); Hisar
- Resting place: Hisar
- Education: Master of Arts (Hindi)
- Occupations: Poet, Principal
- Writing career
- Pen name: Hans
- Language: Hindi
- Notable awards: Haryana Sahitya Akademi 1966 Rajya Kavi; Haryana Sahitya Akademi 2006 Sur Puruskar; Haryana Sahitya Akademi 2009 Haryana Sahitya Rattan Samman

Uday Bhanu (1926–2019) was a Hindi poet. He born in Daira Din Panah, Muzaffargarh, Punjab, Pakistan. He was bestowed with the title of the state poet of Haryana when Haryana became a state in 1966.

== Publications ==
=== Poetry ===
- Bhedion Ke Dhang
- Hans Muktavali
- Sant Sipahi
- Desan Mein Des Haryana
- Sankh aur Shehnai
- Uday Bhanu Hans Rachanawali 1
- Uday Bhanu Hans Rachanawali 2
- Uday Bhanu Hans Rachanawali 3
- Uday Bhanu Hans Rachanawali 4

=== Books written about him ===
- Uday Bhanu Hans Ki Kavya Sadhna
- Udaybhanu Hans Ke Partinidhi Geet
- Kavya Sarovar Ka Hans

== Awards ==
When Haryana became a separate state in 1966, Uday Bhanu was declared as its state poet of Haryana. He was awarded Sur Puruskar in 2006 and Haryana Sahitya Rattan Samman in 2009 by Haryana Sahitya Akademi. Uday Bhanu Hans Awards are given every year in his honour.

== Personal life ==
Uday Bhanu was born on 2 August 1926 at Daira Din Panah in Muzaffargarh district of Pakistan. His family shifted to Hisar after partition of India in 1947 when he was 22 years old. He completed his Master of Arts in Hindi language and joined as a teacher. Yashpal Sharma was one of his students. He retired as principal of Government College, Hisar and lived in Hisar. He was also the secretary of Chandigarh Sahitya Akademi and a member of advisory committee of Haryana Sahitya Akademi.
