= Nawabzada Nasrullah Khan =

Pakistani politician (1916–2003)

- نواب زاده نصر الله خان

Chairman of Pakistan Democratic Party
- In office June 1967 – 27 September 2003
- Preceded by: position created
- Succeeded by: Nawabzada Mansoor Ahmed Khan

Chairman of Alliance for Restoration of Democracy
- In office unknown – 27 September 2003

Personal details
- Born: 13 November 1916 Muzaffargarh, Punjab, British India
- Died: 27 September 2003 (aged 86) Islamabad, Pakistan
- Party: Pakistan Democratic Party (1967 – 2003)
- Other party: All-Pakistan Awami League (1964 – 1967); National Democratic Front (1963 – 1964); Council Muslim League (1962 – 1963); Pakistan Muslim League (1947 – 1958); All-India Muslim League (1947 – 1947); Majlis-e-Ahrar-e-Islam (1933 – 1947)
- Children: Nawabzada Mansoor Ahmed Khan (son); Nawabzada Iftikhar Ahmed Khan Babar (son)

Nawabzada Nasrullah Khan (Urdu: نواب زاده نصر الله خان) (13 November 1916 – 27 September 2003) was a statesman in British India and later Pakistan. He was also a prominent Urdu poet. He was the only West Pakistani to have served as the leader of the Awami League.

== Early life and education ==
He was born in Khangarh, Muzaffargarh District in Punjab in a prominent land-owning aristocratic family. Following the tradition of the elite of British India, he was educated at Aitchison College in Lahore.

== Political career ==
He started his political career in 1933 by joining the anti-British Majlis-e-Ahrar-e-Islam, soon after it was formed by Syed Ata ullah Shah Bukhari. He was considered to be close to the famous journalist Agha Shorish Kashmiri. He was also elected the Secretary General of All India Majlis-e-Ahrar-e-Islam in 1945. This party held an Indian Nationalist position. Nawabzada Nasrullah Khan, coming from a background with ties to the Indian National Congress and Majlis-e-Ahrar-ul-Islam, opposed the Muslim League and its demand for the partition of India. He was also a protege of Syed Ata ullah Shah Bukhari.

However, he changed course and joined the All-India Muslim League in 1947 after the partition of India and the creation of Pakistan occurred. He won a seat of Provincial Assembly of Punjab in general elections in 1952 and the National Assembly of Pakistan seat in the 1962 general elections.

He ardently participated in the 1953 and 1974 movement to declare Ahmadis as non-Muslims, supporting the Majlis-e-Ahrar-e-Islam and other religious parties; he himself too participated in the protests.

In 1964, he supported Fatima Jinnah in the election against president Ayub Khan.

In 1966, he served as the President of the Awami League party mostly active in former East Pakistan. In June 1967, he founded his own political party named as Pakistan Democratic Party and served its chairman till his death in 2003. He helped form the opposition alliance Democratic Action Committee to remove military dictator President Ayub Khan from power. In 1993, he was elected again to the National Assembly of Pakistan. He was also made the chairperson of the Kashmir Committee. Just before his death, he was the Chairman of Alliance for Restoration of Democracy (ARD) working for the restoration of democracy in Pakistan against General Pervez Musharraf.

== Death and legacy ==
He died on 27 September 2003 after being admitted to a hospital in Islamabad, following a heart attack. He was 86 years old. He is buried in Khangarh, District Muzaffargarh, Punjab, Pakistan. His survivors include five sons and four daughters. Two of his sons have been politicians.

A major Pakistani English-language newspaper comments about him, "Known for his Hukka, dark achkan and distinctive cap, Nawabzada Nasrullah Khan spent all his life in fighting against dictators, military as well as civilian, and struggled to strengthen the parliamentary democracy, bothering little how he would go down in history for targeting all governments."

In its obituary for Nawabzada Nasrullah Khan, Dawn of Pakistan called him a 'Crusading democrat'.

Another major English-language newspaper The Nation ran his obituary in its editorial - titled, 'Death of a veteran'.

== Books ==
Nawabzada Nasrullah Khan authored and was the subject of several books, which include compilations of his speeches, writings, and memoirs reflecting his long career in politics and his advocacy for democracy in Pakistan. Notable works include:

- جمہوریت کی تلاش, In Search of Democracy — a collection of his speeches and writings on parliamentary democracy and civilian supremacy in Pakistan.
- میرے مشاہدات, My Observations — memoirs recounting his experiences during the Pakistan Movement and his role in opposition politics.
- پاکستان میں جمہوریت اور آمریت, Democracy and Dictatorship in Pakistan — a critical commentary on the struggle between democratic forces and military dictatorships.
- نوابزادہ نصراللہ خان: زندگی اور خدمت, Nawabzada Nasrullah Khan: Life and Service — a biographical account compiled by his contemporaries, featuring his letters and articles.

Many of his speeches delivered in the National Assembly and at political rallies have also been compiled and published posthumously, highlighting his lifelong commitment to democratic ideals and constitutionalism.

== Family tree ==
Nawabzada Nasrullah Khan
Nawabzada Nisar Ahmad Khan Babar	Nawabzada Mansoor Ahmad Khan Babar	Nawabzada Iftikhar Ahmad Khan Babar	Nawabzada Abrar Ahmad Khan Babar	Nawabzada Israr Ahmad Khan Babar
