= Daira Din Panah =

Daira Din Panah دائرہ دین پناہ
- Town
- Location within Punjab, Pakistan Location within Pakistan
- Coordinates: 30°07′43″N 71°18′46″E
- Country: Pakistan
- Province: Punjab
- District: Kot Addu
- Time zone: UTC+5 (PST)
- Postal code: 34010

Daira Din Panah (Urdu: دائرہ دین پناہ) locally or commonly called as D. D. Panah (Urdu: ڈی ڈی پناہ) or DDP (Urdu: ڈی ڈی پی) is a union council and town near Kot Addu in the Kot Addu District of Punjab, Pakistan. It has a population of over 16 thousand and is located east of the Indus River. It has a railway station.

== See also ==
- Daira Din Panah Goat
- Daira Din Panah Railway Station
- Kot Addu

== Notable persons ==
- Malik Ahmad Yar Hunjra
- Malik Ghulam Qasim Hanjra
