= Karam Dad Qureshi mosque shooting =

1999 massacre in Punjab, Pakistan

Coordinates: 30.0759°N 70.9603°E

On 4 January 1999, a mass shooting was carried out at a Shia mosque in Karam Dad Qureshi, Punjab, Pakistan, killing 17 people.

== Background ==
Sectarian attacks between majority Sunnis and minority Shias are common in Pakistan. In September 1996, 22 people were killed in a mass shooting at a Sunni mosque in Multan, Punjab.

== Attack ==
At 6:25am on 4 January 1999, four men arrived by car at a Shia mosque in Karam Dad Qureshi, a village in Muzaffargarh Tehsil, Muzaffargarh District, in the Punjab province of Pakistan. As one stood by the entrance to the mosque and the driver stayed in the car, the other two entered the building, carrying guns, as worshippers were studying the Quran after morning prayers. They fired at the worshippers, killing 17 of them.

== Reaction ==
No group claimed responsibility for the massacre. Several members of the hardline Sunni group, Sipah-e-Sahaba Pakistan, were arrested.
