= NA-176 (Muzaffargarh-I) =

Constituency of the National Assembly of Pakistan

- Former constituency for the National Assembly of Pakistan
- Region: Muzaffargarh District

Former constituency
- Created: 2002
- Abolished: 2018
- Replaced by: NA-181 (Muzaffargarh-I); NA-182 (Muzaffargarh-II); NA-183 (Muzaffargarh-III); NA-184 (Muzaffargarh-IV)

NA-176 (Muzaffargarh-I) (Urdu: این اے-۱۷۶، مُظفّرگڑھ-۱) was a constituency for the National Assembly of Pakistan. It comprised mainly areas of Muzaffargarh Tehsil and Kot Addu Tehsil. After the 2018 delimitations, this constituency, along with its neighboring NA-177, were broken up into three constituencies - NA-181, NA-182 (which also includes city of Muzaffargarh from old NA-178), and NA-183.

== Election 2002 ==
General elections were held on 10 October 2002. Mrs Khalida Mohsin Ali Qurishi of PPP won by 58,947 votes.

General election 2002: NA-176 Muzaffargarh-I
Party	Candidate	Votes	%	±%
PPP	Khalida Mohsin Ali Qurishi	58,947	45.25	
PML(Q)	Malik Ghulam Qasim Hinjra	55,612	42.69	
MMA	Dr. Ghulam Qadir	11,557	8.87	
Independent	Malik Ahmad Yar Hanjra	2,823	2.17	
Others	Others (three candidates)	1,331	1.02	
Turnout		134,472	51.77	
Total valid votes		130,270	96.88	
Rejected ballots		4,202	3.12	
Majority		3,335	2.56	
Registered electors		259,766		

== Election 2008 ==
General elections were held on 18 February 2008. Muhammad Mohsin Ali Qureshi of PPP won by 50,826 votes.

General election 2008: NA-176 Muzaffargarh-I
Party	Candidate	Votes	%	±%
PPP	Muhammad Mohsin Ali Qureshi	50,826	35.73	
PML(Q)	Malik Ghulam Qasim Hinjra	46,745	32.86	
PML(N)	Mian Muhammad Arshad Abbas Qureshi	42,225	29.69	
Others	Others (four candidates)	2,450	1.72	
Turnout		146,828	53.38	
Total valid votes		142,246	96.88	
Rejected ballots		4,582	3.12	
Majority		4,081	2.87	
Registered electors		275,075		

== Election 2013 ==
General elections were held on 11 May 2013. Malik Sultan Mehmood Hanjra of PML-N won by 88,322 votes and became the member of National Assembly.

General election 2013: NA-176 Muzaffargarh-I
Party	Candidate	Votes	%	±%
PML(N)	Malik Sultan Mehmood	88,322	42.89	
PML(F)	Malik Ghulam Mustafa Khar	74,840	36.35	
PPP	Muhammad Arshad Abbas Qureshi	17,183	8.35	
PTI	Maher Naveed Ahmad Kherha	10,840	5.26	
Independent	Ghulam Murtaza Raheem	4,074	1.98	
Independent	Muhammad Shabir Ali	2,950	1.43	
Others	Others (thirteen candidates)	7,706	3.74	
Turnout		215,252	63.64	
Total valid votes		205,915	95.66	
Rejected ballots		9,337	4.34	
Majority		13,482	6.54	
Registered electors		338,237		
