= NA-176 =

NA-176 may refer to:

- NA-176 (Muzaffargarh-I), a former constituency of the National Assembly of Pakistan
- NA-176 (Rahim Yar Khan-II), a constituency of the National Assembly of Pakistan
