= Kot Addu =

Kot Addu کوٹ ادو
- City
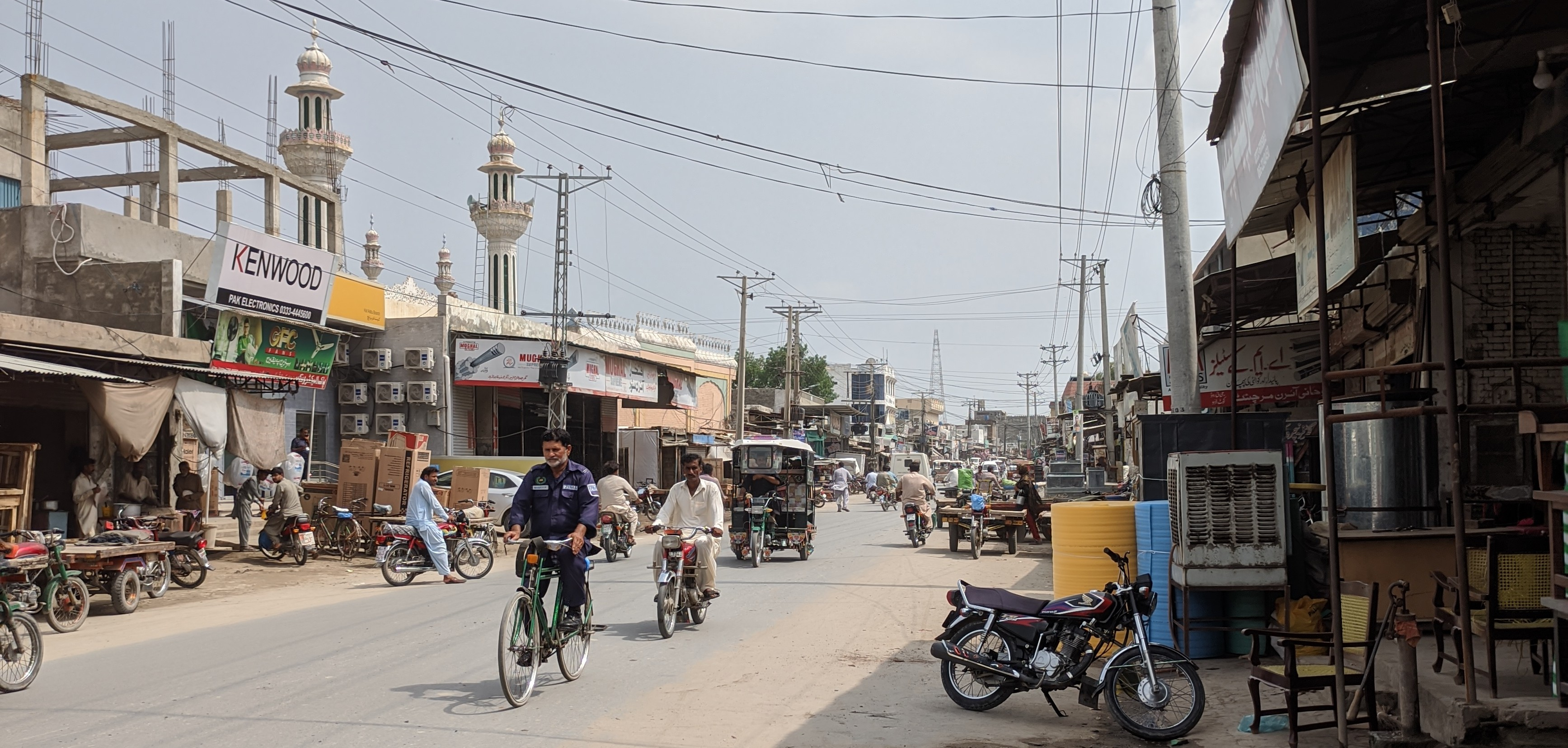
- Karim Daad Qureshi Kot Addu Road (part of G.T. Road)

- Location within Punjab, Pakistan Location within Pakistan
- Coordinates: 30°27′59″N 70°57′56″E
- Country: Pakistan
- Province: Punjab
- District: Kot Addu

Government
  - Type: Municipal Committee
  - Administrator: Mir Rumman Khalil
  - Municipal Officer: Vacant

Population (2026)
  - City: 145,000+
  - Rank: 83rd in Pakistan
- Time zone: UTC+5 (PST)
- Postal code: 34050

Kot Addu (Urdu: کوٹ ادو) is the capital city of newly created Kot Addu District in the Punjab province of Pakistan. The city is subdivided into five Union Councils and has a population of over 142,100, making it the 83rd most populous city in Pakistan. It is located just east of the Indus River, about 68Km from Multan and 20Km from Taunsa Barrage.

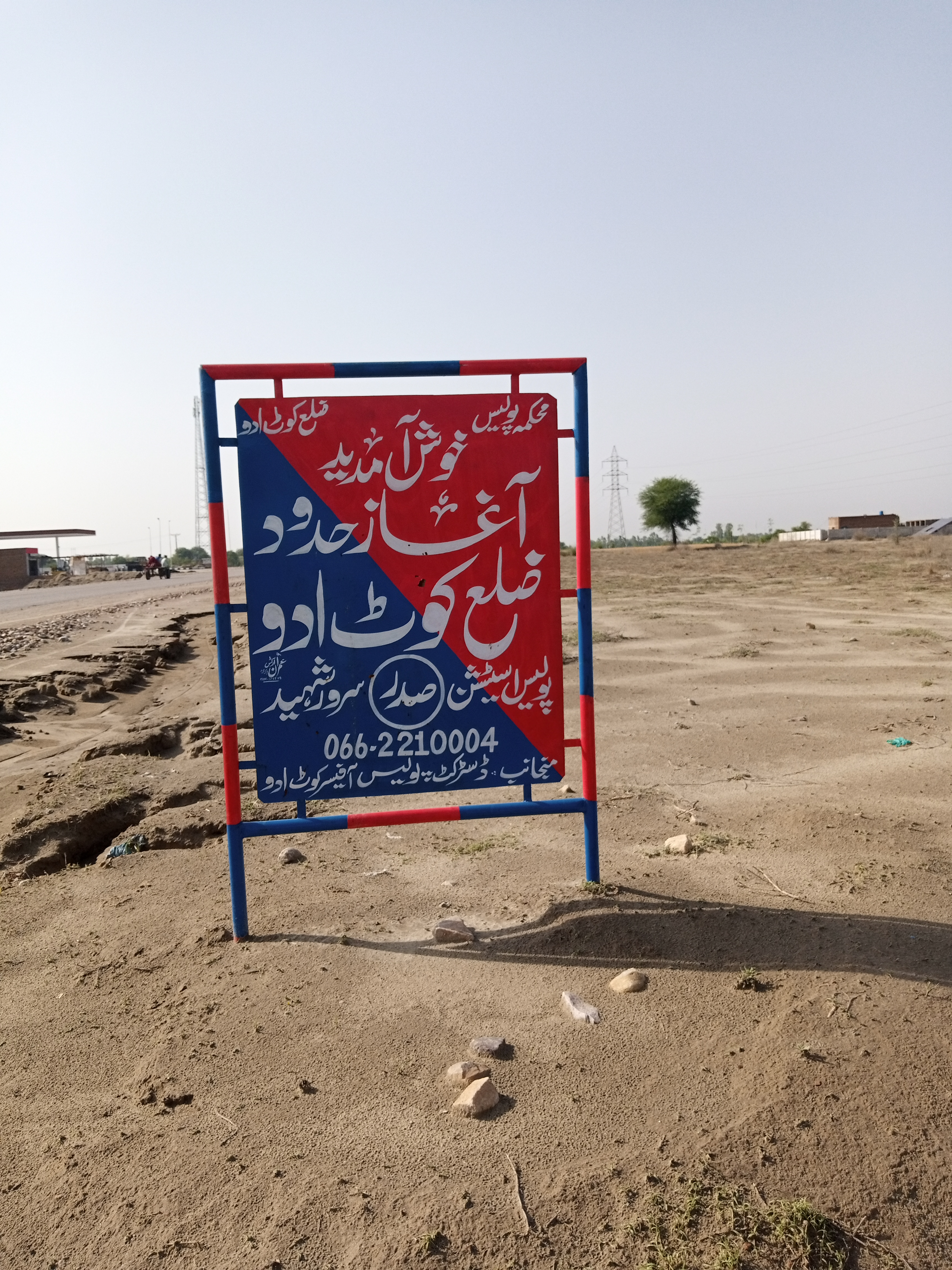
A board representing the boundary of district Kot Addu

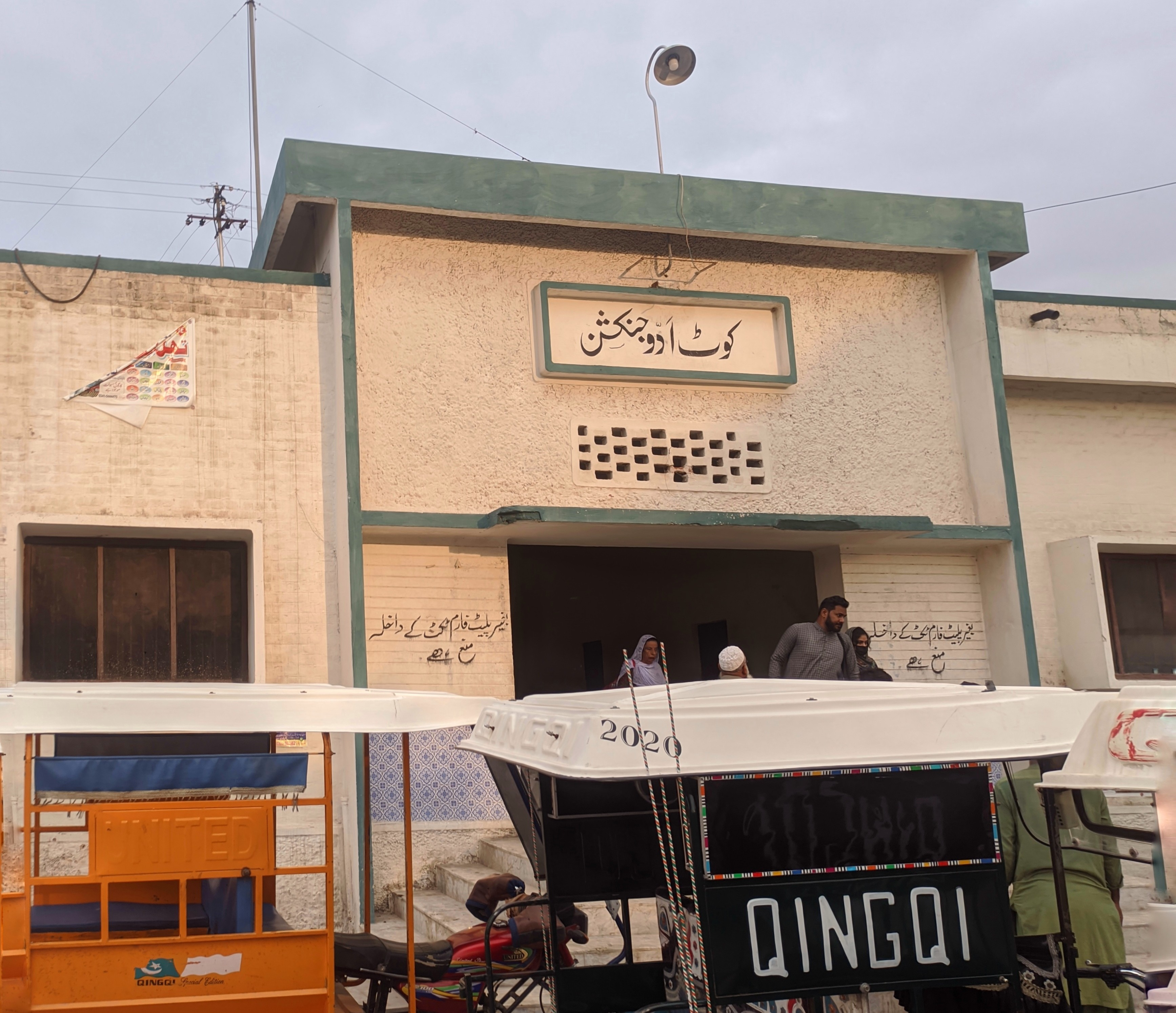
Kot Addu Junction railway station

Kot Addu City attracts a large number of tourists every year, due to the Indus river and public gardens, among other things. The city is served by Kot Addu Junction railway station. The Zip code of Kot Addu is 34050.

== Demographics ==
Population

Historical population
Year	Pop.	±% p.a.
1951	10,507	—
1961	13,107	+2.24%
1972	21,409	+4.56%
1981	37,479	+6.42%
1998	80,720	+4.62%
2017	129,703	+2.53%
2023	142,161	+1.54%

According to 2023 census, Kot Addu had a population of 142,161.

Languages

Languages of Kot Addu MC (2023 Census)
1. Saraiki (69.6%)
2. Urdu (25.8%)
3. Punjabi (3.50%)
4. Others (1.10%)
- Total population
  - 142,161 persons
- Location
  - N 30° 28' 34 E 70° 57' 52
- Total Area
  - 877,989 acres (355,310 ha)
- Area under cultivation
  - 4,24,521

The city contains a total of 33 Union councils, which are listed below.

1. Haider Ghazi
2. Bait Qaimwala
3. BhariHoog
4. Budh
5. Chak No. 547/TDA
6. Chak No. 565/TDA
7. Chak No. 632/TDA
8. Chowk Sarwar Shaheed
9. Daira Din Panah
10. Dogar Kalasra
11. Ghazi Ghatt
12. Hinjrai
13. Ehsanpur
14. Kot Adu No. 2
15. Kot Adu No. 1
16. Kot Adu No. 3
17. Manhan Sharif
18. Mehmood Kot
19. Mirpur Bhagal
20. Pattal Monda
21. Pattal Kot Adu
22. Patti Ghulam Ali
23. Sanawan
24. Shadi Khan Monda
25. Sheikh Umer
26. Thatha Gurmani
27. U.C. 22 Gujrat
28. Wahandur
29. Pirhar
30. cha larr wala
31. NoorShah
32. Basti Sirai
33. Alu Rid

== Location ==
The city of Kot Addu is located in the southern area of Punjab province, almost at the exact center of Pakistan. The area around the city is a flat plain and is ideal for agriculture. There are two main canals (Muzaffar, and T.P. link) and eight sub-canals that cross Kot Addu, providing water from the Indus River. The geographical coordinates of the city, according to Google Maps, are: N 30° 28' 34" Latitude and E 70° 57' 52" longitude. Kot Addu is located at an average elevation of 133 meters above sea level.

== Geography and climate ==
Kot Addu is located almost exactly at the geographical center of Pakistan. The closest major city is Multan. The area around the city is a flat alluvial plain and is ideal for agriculture, with many citrus and mango farms. There are also canals that cut across the Muzaffargarh District, providing water to farms. During the monsoon season, the land close to the Taunsa Barrage is usually flooded.

Kot Addu has an arid climate with very hot summers and mild winters. The city has experienced some of the most extreme weather in Pakistan. The highest recorded temperature was approximately 51 °C (129 °F), and the lowest recorded temperature was approximately −1 °C (30 °F). The average rainfall is roughly 127 millimeters (5.0 inches). Dust storms are a common occurrence within the city.

== Education ==
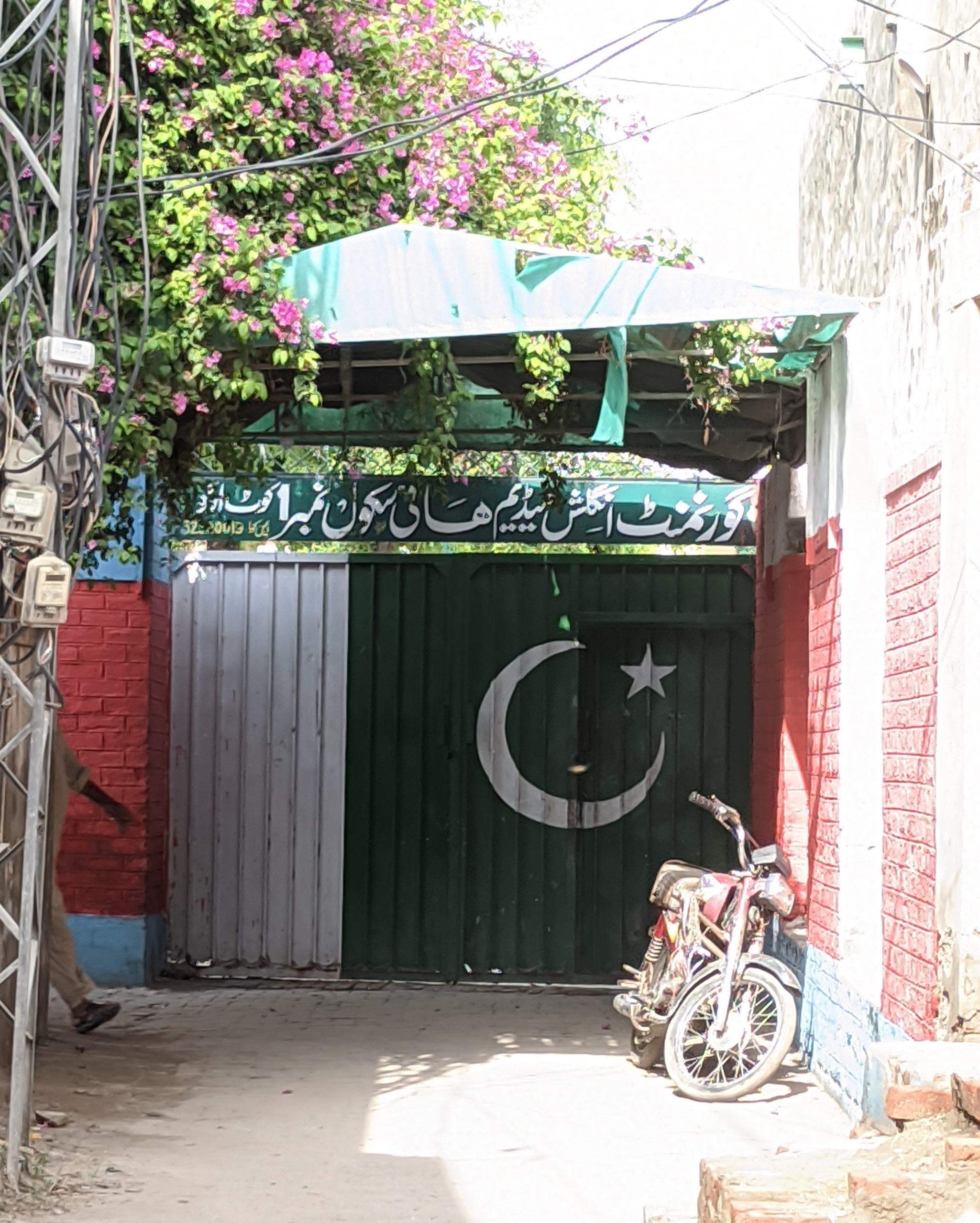
A public high school in Kot Addu.

Like other major cities in Punjab, Kot Addu features a rich educational landscape. In the last few years, the city has observed a surge in the number of educational institutions. Colleges include private commerce and science colleges, schools, academies like Concordia Colleges (a project of Beaconhouse), Punjab Inter Science Academy, and a Cadet College (now: Superior Group Of Colleges). Government degrees are provided for both men and women. Several colleges are affiliated with the Bahuddin Zakrya University (B.Z.U) Multan Pakistan, and Punjab University Lahore Pakistan.

Some of the private educational institutions in the area are: Kot Addu School of Economics and Management Sciences; Punjab Higher Secondary School, Bismillah; Inter Science Academy; Punjab Group of Colleges; My School System; Dar-E-Arqam School; Oxford Grammar School and Professor Academy. A government technical college is also under construction.

=== Schools and colleges ===
- Dar-e-Arqam School Kot Addu Campus
- Punjab Group of Colleges Kot Addu Campus

== Taunsa Barrage ==
Taunsa Barrage is a barrage on the River Indus. It is situated 20 kilometres (12 mi) southeast of Taunsa Sharif and 16 kilometres (9.9 mi) from Kot Addu. This barrage controls water flow in the River Indus for irrigation and flood control purposes. This barrage serves 2.351 million acres (951,400 hectares) besides diverting flows from Indus River to the Chenab River through Taunsa Panjnad (TP) Link Canal. The barrage also serves as an arterial road bridge, a railway bridge, and crossing for gas and oil pipelines, telephone line and extra high voltage (EHV) transmission lines. Watch more here.

2010 Floods

In 2011, the rehabilitation of the Taunsa Barrage was blamed for devastation of the Muzaffargarh district during the 2010 Pakistan floods. Critics blamed the rehabilitation of the barrage, alleging that it failed to raise its height and strengthen protective embankments, used dysfunctional computer control system of the hoist gates and ignored hill-torrent management.

== Industry ==
Kot Addu is a prominent commercial and industrial city in the Punjab province. It is connected by road and rail with Lahore, Karachi, Multan, Islamabad, Quetta, and Faisalabad; and also by air from Multan Airport to all Pakistani airports.

=== Main industries ===
- Pak Arab Oil Refinery (PARCO)
- Water And Power Development Authority (WAPDA)

==== Power stations ====
- Kot Adu Power Company (KAPCO)
- LalpirThermal Power Station

==== Sugar mills ====
- Sheikhoo Sugar Mill
- Fatima Sugar Mill

Flour Mills

- Gillani Flour Mill Ltd
- Shoaib Qasim Floor Mill

Besides these, cotton factories, foundries, cotton, woolen, and silk textile mills, flour, and oil mills are also located in this region. This area is famous for its handicrafts (Kundra work), and cottage industries.

Numerous cottage industries are present in the region. The area has cotton factories, foundries, cotton, wool and silk textile mills, as well as flour and oil mills. This area is known for its handicrafts (Kundra work), and cottage industries.

=== Information technology ===
As information technology has become increasingly important, Kot Addu has adopted this change. The first professional information technology center was introduced in 2002, named I.TECH, which then also opened a branch in Dubai in 2006, U.A.E. It mainly focuses on web designing and development. There are many other institutions contributing towards education in information technology. In November, 2009, the Government of Pakistan also opened LAL-MEER technical college in the Union of Kot Addu.

== Health centres ==
There is one government civil hospital and several private hospitals in the city, beside much small government and private hospitals in the union councils. Following is the Tehsil-Level Hospital (THQ hospital) in the city:

- THQ Hospital Kot Addu

== Agriculture ==
Kot Addu is an important agricultural area. The total area of tehsil Kot Addu is 877,989 acres (355,310 ha), of which 4,24,521 acres are under cultivation. The main crops of the area include corn, cotton, rice, sugarcane, tobacco, wheat, and vegetables like Bajra, moong, mash and masoor. Oil seeds, such as mustard and sunflower seeds, are also grown in the district.

Mangoes, citrus, guavas, and pomegranates are Kot Addu's most important fruit crops. Minor fruit crops include dates, jaman, pears, falsa and bananas are also grown.

One other local fruit is called a bare (berry). It is one of the main fruits grown in this region. Due to flooding, the crops are now rare, especially cotton and wheat products affected by this flooding. Now a majority of the agricultural lands are covered by sugarcane. People either sell this sugarcane to sugar mills or produce jaggery from sugarcane.

== Notable people ==
- Inayat Hussain Bhatti - film industry
- Mushtaq Ahmed Gurmani - former Governor of West Pakistan
- Malik Ahmad Yar Hunjra - Member of the Provincial Assembly of the Punjab
- Pathanay Khan - poet, pride of performance
- Ghulam Mustafa Khar - former Governor and Chief Minister of Punjab
- Hina Rabbani Khar - former Foreign Minister of Pakistan
- Sultan Mehmood - former Minister
- Mian Shabbir Ali Qureshi - former Federal Minister
- Muhammad Ashraf Khan Rind - Member of Provincial Assembly of the Punjab
- Milkha Singh - Indian athlete also known as the "Flying Sikh"

== See also ==
- Kot Addu Tehsil
