= Manhan Sharif =

Manhan Sharif is one of the 28 union councils of Kot Addu, Muzaffargarh District, Pakistan.

== Main crops ==
- Corn
- Rice
- Sugarcane
- Cotton

== Location ==
It is located in the southwest of Kot Addu city.

== Water resources ==
This area is irrigated by a canal named Nala Sardar, which is a distributary of Muzaffargarh canal.

== Products ==
The people of this area Produce Jaggery from sugarcane and also grow wheat and rice at industrial level.

== Nearby industries ==
- Kot Addu Power Company (Kapco) (7 km)
- Fatima Sugar Mill (35 km)
- Sheikho Sugar Mills (38 km)
- Pak Arab Refinery Limited (50 km)
- Lal-peer Thermal Power Station
