= PP-269 Muzaffargarh-II =

Constituency of the Punjabi Provincial Legislature, Pakistan

- Constituency for the Provincial Assembly of Punjab
- Region: Muzaffargarh Tehsil (partly) of Muzaffargarh District

Current constituency
- Created from: PP-255 Muzaffargarh-V (2002-2018); PP-277 Muzaffargarh-X (2018-2023)

PP-269 Muzaffargarh-II (پی پی-269، مظفرگڑھ-2) is a Constituency of Provincial Assembly of Punjab.

== By-election 2025 ==
By-election 2025: PP-269 Muzaffargarh-II
Party	Candidate	Votes	%	±%
PPP	Mian Alamdar Abbas Qureshi	55,868	49.15	
Independent	Muhammad lqbal Khan	46,320	40.75	
Independent	Abdul Hayi Dasti	9,981	8.78	
Others	Others (fourteen candidates)	1,496	1.32	
Turnout		115,917	50.82	
Total valid votes		113,665	98.06	
Rejected ballots		2,252	1.94	
Majority		9,548	8.40	
Registered electors		228,101		
hold				

== General elections 2024 ==
Provincial election 2024: PP-269 Muzaffargarh-II
Party	Candidate	Votes	%	±%
PPP	Mian Alamdar Abbas Qureshi	34,620	26.72	
Independent	Muhammad lqbal Khan S/0 Muhammad Nawaz Khan	33,112	25.55	
Independent	Rashid Nadeem (Note: Filed nomination papers as PTI candidate but ECP allowed him to run as an Independent)	21,689	18.18	
Independent	Muhammad Imran	12,251	9.45	
PML(N)	Manzoor Ahmad Khan	6,508	5.02	
Independent	Ezan Shah	5,340	4.12	
TLP	Allah Bachaya	4,403	3.40	
Independent	Khadim Hussain Ghori	2,483	1.92	
Others	Others (twenty six candidates)	7,309	5.64	
Turnout		134,475	62.01	
Total valid votes		129,579	96.36	
Rejected ballots		4,896	3.64	
Majority		1,508	1.17	
Registered electors		216,865		
hold				

== General elections 2018 ==
Provincial election 2018: PP-277 Muzaffargarh-X
Party	Candidate	Votes	%	±%
Independent	Mian Alamdar Abbas Qureshi	34,314	32.95	
Independent	Muhammad lqbal Khan	30,798	29.57	
PTI	Nosheen Abbas	16,350	15.70	
TLP	Shoaib Kamran Khan	7,774	7.47	
Independent	Muhammad Habib Ullah Qureshi	4,837	4.65	
Independent	Mian Riaz Hussain Qureshi	3,280	3.15	
PML(N)	Ch. Khalid Mehmood	2,490	2.39	
Independent	Muhammad Rizwan Khalid IND	1,828	1.76	
Independent	Zulfiqar Ali Khan	1,650	1.58	
Others	Others (five candidates)	823	0.80	
Turnout		108,065	64.59	
Total valid votes		104,144	96.37	
Rejected ballots		3,921	3.63	
Majority		3,516	3.38	
Registered electors		167,312		

== General elections 2013 ==
Provincial election 2013: PP-255 Muzaffargarh-V
Party	Candidate	Votes	%	±%
Independent	Mian Alamdar Abbas Quraishi	47,266	45.12	
PML(N)	Malik Muhammad Farooq Khar	22,364	21.35	
Independent	Doctor Sohail Alam Gujjar	8,735	8.34	
PTI	Sardar Muhammad Arshad Khan Qandrani	7,307	6.98	
Independent	Muneer Ahmed Khan Chandia	7,113	6.79	
PPP	Sardar Nawazish Ali Khan	6,046	5.77	
MDM	Rana Muhammad Idrees	2,880	2.75	
Independent	Abdul Sattar	1,068	1.02	
Others	Others (ten candidates)	1,968	1.88	
Turnout		108,254	67.65	
Total valid votes		104,747	96.76	
Rejected ballots		3,507	3.24	
Majority		24,902	23.77	
Registered electors		160,010		

== General elections 2008 ==
Contesting candidates	Party affiliation	Votes polled

== See also ==
- PP-268 Muzaffargarh-I
- PP-270 Muzaffargarh-III
