= Abdul Hayi Dasti =

Pakistani politician

Member of the Provincial Assembly of the Punjab
- In office 15 August 2018 – 14 January 2023
- Constituency: PP-270 Muzaffargarh-III

Personal details
- Party: JUI (F) (2025-present)
- Other political affiliations: IPP (2023-2025); PTI (2018-2023)
- Relatives: Abdul Hamid Khan Dasti (grandfather); Amjad Hamid Khan Dasti (uncle); Tehmina Dasti (cousin)

Abdul Hayi Dasti is a Pakistani politician who had been a member of the Provincial Assembly of the Punjab from August 2018 till January 2023.

== Political career ==
He was elected to the Provincial Assembly of the Punjab as an independent candidate from Constituency PP-270 (Muzaffargarh-III) in the 2018 Pakistani general election.

He joined Pakistan Tehreek-e-Insaf (PTI) following his election.

On 11 September 2018, he was inducted into the provincial Punjab cabinet of Chief Minister Usman Buzdar and was appointed advisor to the Chief Minister on agriculture.

On 18 May 2023, he left the PTI due to the 2023 Pakistani protests.
