= Daira Din Panah Goat =

Breed of goat

Daira Din Panah goat
- Conservation status: FAO (2007): not at risk
- Other names: DDP
- Country of origin: Pakistan
- Distribution: Punjab
- Use: milk

Traits
- Weight: Male: 61.7 kg; Female: 40.9 kg
- Height: Male: 81 cm; Female: 70 cm
- Goat; Capra aegagrus hircus

The Daira Din Panah goat is a breed of domestic goat from the Kot Addu, Layyah and Muzaffargarh districts of the Punjab province of Pakistan. It is used primarily for milk production. The registered population was reported in 2006 as 142,403.
