= Malik Ahmad Karim Qaswar Langrial =

Pakistani politician

Member of the Provincial Assembly of the Punjab
- In office 29 May 2013 – 31 May 2018

Personal details
- Born: 30 October 1971 (age 55) Muzaffargarh, Punjab, Pakistan
- Party: IPP (2025-present)
- Other political affiliations: IND (2018-2025); PMLN (2013); PML(Q) (2002)

Malik Ahmad Karim Qaswar Langrial is a Pakistani politician who was a Member of the Provincial Assembly of the Punjab, from May 2013 to May 2018.

== Early life and education ==
He was born on 30 October 1971 in Muzaffargarh.

He graduated in law from Bahauddin Zakariya University in 1991.

== Political career ==
He was elected to the Provincial Assembly of the Punjab as a candidate of Pakistan Muslim League (Q) (PML-Q) from Constituency PP-257 (Muzaffargarh-VII) in the 2002 Pakistani general election. He received 20643 votes and defeated Nawabzada Muhammad Ahmad Khan.

He was elected to the Provincial Assembly of the Punjab as a candidate of Pakistan Muslim League (Nawaz) from Constituency PP-257 (Muzaffargarh-VII) in the 2013 Pakistani general election.

In December 2013, he was appointed as Parliamentary Secretary for planning & development.

He ran for the seat of the National Assembly of the Pakistan as an independent candidate from Constituency NA-184 (Muzaffargarh-IV) in the 2018 Pakistani general election, but was unsuccessful. He received 41753 votes, and lost the seat to Iftikhar Ahmed Khan Babar, a candidate of Pakistan Peoples Party (PPP).
