= Tehmina Dasti =

Pakistani politician

Member of the National Assembly of Pakistan
- In office 2002–2007

Personal details
- Born: Muzaffargarh
- Other political affiliations: PTI (2018-To date); PML (Q) (2001-2018)
- Parent: Amjad Hameed Khan Dasti (father)
- Relatives: Abdul Hamid Khan Dasti (Grand-father); Abdul Hayi Dasti (cousin)

Tehmina Dasti is a Pakistani politician. She is daughter of Amjad Hameed Khan Dasti and granddaughter of Abdul Hamid Khan Dasti.

== Political career ==
She contested to be a member of the National Assembly of Pakistan from NA-182 (Muzaffargarh-II), in 2018, from PTI and got 33942 votes.

Previously, in 2002, she was elected to one of the seats reserved for women in the National Assembly of Pakistan from 2002-2007.

She also unsuccessfully contested in the 2005 elections for District Nazim Muzaffargarh. Her cousin Abdul Hayi Dasti was elected as MPA Punjab in the 2018 Pakistani general election.
