= Iftikhar Ahmed Khan Babar =

Pakistani politician

Member of the National Assembly of Pakistan
- In office 13 August 2018 – 10 August 2023
- Constituency: NA-184 (Muzaffargarh-IV)

Special Assistant to the Prime Minister on Kashmir Affairs & Gilgit Baltistan

Personal details
- Party: PPP (2013-present)
- Other political affiliations: PML(N) (2008-2013); PML(Q) (2005)
- Parent: Nawabzada Nasrullah Khan (father)
- Relatives: Nawabzada Mansoor Ahmed Khan (brother)

Nawabzada Iftikhar Ahmed Khan Babar is a Pakistani politician who is a member of the National Assembly of Pakistan from February 2024. He is the son of Nawabzada Nasrullah Khan. He has been appointed Special Assistant to PM Shahbaz Sharif. He is the chairman of parliament standing committee on aviation.

== Political career ==
Iftikhar Khan first joined the PML-Q in 2005 and later PML-N after the 2008 elections. Before the 2013 elections, he joined the Pakistan Peoples Party (PPP).

Babar served as divisional president of the PPP for Dera Ghazi Khan.

He was elected to the National Assembly of Pakistan from Constituency NA-184 (Muzaffargarh-IV) as a candidate of the PPP in the 2018 Pakistani general election. He received 54,879 votes and defeated Malik Ahmad Karim Qaswar Langrial. He won 2024 Pakistani general elections and won from constituency NA176. He received 53801 and defeated Basit Sultan Bukhari.

== Family Tree ==
Nawabzada Nasrullah Khan
Nawabzada Mansoor Ahmed Khan	Iftikhar Ahmed Khan Babar
