= Raza Rabbani Khar =

Pakistani politician

Malik Ghulam Mohammad Raza Rabbani Khar

Member of the National Assembly of Pakistan
- In office 13 August 2018 – 10 August 2023
- Constituency: NA-183 (Muzaffargarh-III)

Personal details
- Party: PPP
- Relatives: Hina Rabbani Khar (sister) Ghulam Rabbani Khar (father)

Malik Ghulam Mohammad Raza Rabbani Khar had been the member of the National Assembly of Pakistan from 2018 to 2023. He was elected from Muzaffargarh, South Punjab in the 2018 general elections. He belongs to the well known Khar family. He is the son of Malik Ghulam Rabbani Khar former Minister and Member of National and Provincial Assemblies and brother of Hina Rabbani Khar former Foreign Minister of Pakistan.

== Political career ==
He was elected to the National Assembly of Pakistan from Constituency NA-183 (Muzaffargarh-III) as a candidate of Pakistan Peoples Party in the 2018 Pakistani general election. He is also a Member of the Standing Committees on Energy, CPEC and Cabinet Division.
