= 2009–10 Pakistan federal budget =

Pakistani Federal Budget

2010 Budget of the Islamic Republic of Pakistan federal government
- Emblem of Pakistan
- Submitted: 13 June 2010
- Submitted by: Naveed Qamar
- Submitted to: National Assembly
- Country: Pakistan
- Debt: $51.5 billion (dec 2009)
- Website: http://www.finance.gov.pk/ Ministry of Finance

The Pakistan federal budget of 2009–2010 has been prepared in accordance with the budgeting and accounting classification system that has been approved by the Government of Pakistan as an integral part of the New Accounting Model. This is the first year the federal budget is being prepared using the newly adopted Medium-Term budgetary Framework (MTBF). Under this method macro projections are made over a rolling 3-year budgetary horizon. This year, expenditure ceilings were issued to Ministries on recurrent budget after Cabinet's approval, in line with the Government's stated priorities.

== Overview ==
The Government of Pakistan announced federal budget for fiscal year 2009–2010 having total volume of Rs 2.489 trillion. The following major changes reported by federal government:

- Rs50 billion allocated for the displaced of operation in Malakand Division
- Inflation rate has declined to 14.4 percent and it will further decline to single digit in the next fiscal year
- Rs 1.488 billion has been allocated for courts
- Tax base will be broadened
- Property gains tax will be expanded
- CVT will be continued
- GDP growth expected to be 3.3 percent for 2009–10
- Salaries of armed forces will be raised from 1 July
- Inflation target for 2009–10 will be 9%
- Rs 70 billion for Benazir Income Support Program for 09–10
- Fiscal deficit will be limited to 4.9 percent or Rs 722 billion
- Current expenditure will be curtailed by 15.3 percent
- Carbon surcharge will be introduced in FY10
- Withholding tax on domestic vehicles ended
- Rs 2.2 billion allocated for environment
- Tax target raised to Rs 2.17 trillion
- Rs 23.1 billion for health.
- Duty on wind power plants withdrawn.
- Social protection net being introduced for farmers.
- Agriculture and value addition to be given special attention.
- Use of new technology in agriculture sector to be encouraged.
- Rs 18 billion for PSDP which is 25 percent higher than the previous year
- CVT on property to be increased to 4 percent from 2 percent.
- Petroleum development levy to end in FY10.
- Government raises salaries of government of employees by 15 percent.
- Tax Collection Target has been set at Rs 1377.5 billion
- Current Expenditures are estimated at 1699.19 billion
- Allocation for People's Works Program: Rs 28 billion
- Allocation for Workers’ Welfare Fund: Rs 10.8 billion
- Government and armed forces’ retired employees will receive 15 percent raise in their net pensions from 1 July 2009
- An increase of allowance equivalent to one basic pay, effective from 1 July 2009, has been approved for the military's personnel deputed in the western part of the country. All the members of the armed forces will get the same from 1 January 2010.
- Rs 262 billion are for federal ministries
- Rs 38 billion are for Azad Jammu and Kashmir, FATA and Northern Areas
- Rs 60 billion are for Corporations
- Rs 60 billion are for Water Sector Development
- Rs 47 billion are for Dams Construction/Raising
- Rs 18 billion for Agriculture
- Rs 23.15 billion have been allocated for Health sector
- Rs 32 billion have been allocated for Education with Rs 22.5 billion for Higher Education
- Development Budget allocated for the Provinces: Rs 200 billion
- National Highway Authority will receive Rs 40.2 billion
- Rs 12.7 billion are for Railways
- Rs 70 billion are allocated for Transport and Communication
- Rs 85 billion have been allocated to overcome energy crisis and would be spent on Electricity, Gas and Water Supply projects.
- Rs 2.96 billion have been allocated for environment protection
- Rs 3.6 billion are for National Internship Program
- Rs 450 million for cultural development
- Rs 583 million for Sports
- Rs 300 m allocated for Postal Ministry in PSDP-2009-10
- Communications Division gets Rs. 45971.990 million in PSDP 2009–10, NHA gets Rs 45706.090
- Govt allocates Rs. 50.000 mln for NRB
- Rs. 3265.377 mln earmarked for 132 projects of Science & Technological Research Division
- Govt. allocates Rs 16709.980 mln for Food Agriculture Division
- Tax on imports raises to 4% from 2%.
- Rs 12 billion allocated for Mangla dam
- Govt to set up export houses.
- Excise duty on cellular down to 19 percent
- Excise duty on CKD reduces by 5 percent
- SIM activation charges have been reduced from Rs 500 to Rs 250
- The funds for the science and technology being doubled
- Rs 10 billion fund allocated for SMEs
- Govt to spend Rs 4 billion on Benazir Tractor Scheme for small cultivators in next two years
- Rs 47 billion allocated for water resources management under PSDP
- The govt not to increase tax on industry
- 600 filtration plants being set up
- sales tax abolished on wheel chairs
- Wind energy projects to be set up in and around Gharo
- Amount for wedding assistance raised from Rs 5000 to Rs 70000
- The limit of health insurance will be Rs 25000 annually
- The retired govt employees and army personnel to receive new raised pension from 1 July
- Rs 60 billion allocated for water
- Rs 12 billion for Pakistan Railways
- Rs 250 levied as custom duty on mobile sets.
- Rs 40 billion allocation for export investment fund.
- Rs 166 billion for construction of dams
- Small and medium-sized dams will be built

== Main allocations ==
The provincial share in federal revenue receipts is estimated at Rs 655 billion during 2009–10, which is 15.3 percent higher than the budget estimates for 2008–09. The capital receipts (net) for 2009–10 have been estimated at Rs 191 billion, against Rs 221 billion budget estimates of 2008–09.

The external receipts in 2009–10 are estimated at Rs 510 billion, which shows an increase of 70 percent over the budget estimates of 2008–09. The overall expenditure during 2009–10 has been estimated at Rs 2482 billion, of which the current expenditure is Rs 1699 billion, and development expenditure at Rs 803 billion.

Current expenditure shows an increase of 3.5 percent over the revised estimates of 2008–09, while development expenditure will increase by 68.1 percent in 2009–10 over the revised estimates of 2008–09. The share of current expenditure in total budgetary outlay for 2009–10 is 68.5 percent, as compared to 79 percent in the revised estimates for 2008–09.

The expenditure on General Public Services (inclusive of debt servicing transfer payments and superannuation allowance) is estimated at Rs 1189 billion, which is 70 percent of the current expenditure. The size of Public Sector Development Program (PSDP) for 2009–10 is Rs 646 billion, while for other development expenditures an amount of Rs 157 billion has been allocated.

The PSDP shows an increase of 54 percent over the revised estimates 2008–09, which were mercilessly slashed during the current year to meet the budget deficit target agreed with the IMF. The provinces have been allocated an amount of Rs 200 billion for budget estimates 2009–10 in their PSDP.

An amount of Rs 25 billion has been allocated for Earthquake Reconstruction and Rehabilitation Authority (Erra) in the PSDP 2009–10. However, there are no foreign loans expected for this purpose in 2009–10. The budget for fiscal year 2008–09 was estimated a total of 31250 million rupees but the revised estimates gave a zero figure. It is not clear whether this is indicative of the donors' backing out of their commitments.

== Change ==
The government on 18 June withdrew the decision of levying carbon surcharge on Compressed Natural Gas (CNG) by deleting the word "carbon" from the head of the levy. Now "surcharge" will be used for taxing petroleum products from financial year i.e. 2009–10 after severe drubbing from different quarters. Prime Minister Syed Yousuf Raza Gilani agreed on the proposal of 20 percent increase in salaries and pension of government employees. Tax on SMS has been removed.

== See also ==
- Ministry of Commerce (Pakistan)
- List of tariffs in Pakistan
- Ministry of Finance (Pakistan)
- Pakistan Board of Investment
- Trading Corporation of Pakistan
- Rice Export Association of Pakistan
- Economy of the OIC
- Finance Minister of Pakistan
- Finance Secretary of Pakistan
- Economic Coordination Committee
- Planning Commission (Pakistan)
