= Sultan Mehmood =

Pakistani politician

Sultan Mehmood Hanjra
- سلطان محمود

Member of the National Assembly of Pakistan
- In office 1 June 2013 – 31 May 2018
- Constituency: NA-176 (Muzaffargarh-I)

Personal details
- Born: 1 January 1948 (age 78)
- Other political affiliations: Pakistan Muslim League (N)
- Relatives: Malik Ahmad Yar Hunjra (nephew); Malik Ghulam Qasim Hanjra (nephew)

Sultan Mehmood Hanjra (Urdu: سلطان محمود ہنجرا; born 1 January 1948) is a Pakistani politician who had been a member of the National Assembly of Pakistan, from June 2013 to May 2018.

== Early life ==
He was born on 1 January 1948.

== Political career ==
He was elected to the National Assembly of Pakistan as a candidate of Pakistan Muslim League (N) (PML-N) from Constituency NA-176 (Muzaffargarh-I) in the 2013 Pakistan general election. He received 88,322 votes and defeated Ghulam Mustafa Khar.

In 2014, he was disqualified by an election tribunal as a member of the National Assembly. The Supreme Court of Pakistan later suspended the notification of Hanjra's disqualification. In 2016, his National Assembly membership was restored.
