= Khangarh, Punjab =

Khangarh خان گڑھ
- City
- Location within Punjab, Pakistan Location within Pakistan
- Coordinates: 29°54′50″N 71°9′36″E
- Country: Pakistan
- Province: Punjab
- District: Muzaffargarh
- Time zone: UTC+5 (PST)

Khangarh (Urdu: خان گڑھ) is a city in the Muzaffargarh District, which is in the southern part of the province Punjab in Pakistan. It is situated on the west bank of the Chenab River. The city is known for being the hometown of the late Nawabzada Nasrullah Khan.
