= PP-267 Rahim Yar Khan-XIII =

Provincial government constituency in Punjab, Pakistan

- Constituency for the Provincial Assembly of Punjab
- Region: Sadiqabad Tehsil (partly) Ahmedpur Lamma town of Rahim Yar Khan District

Current constituency
- Created from: PP-295 Rahimyar Khan-XI (2002-2018); PP-265 Rahim Yar Khan-XI (2018-2023)

PP-267 Rahim Yar Khan-XIII (پی پی-267، رحیم یار خان-13) is a Constituency of Provincial Assembly of Punjab.

== General elections 2024 ==
Provincial election 2024: PP-267 Rahim Yar Khan-XIII
| Party | Candidate | Votes | % | ±% |
|---|---|---|---|---|
| PPP | Rais Nabeel Ahmed | 46,483 | 43.08 | |
| Independent | Rais Muhammad Hamza (Note: Filed nomination papers as PTI candidate but ECP allowed him to run as an Independent) | 26,785 | 24.83 | |
| PML(N) | Rais Ibrahim Khalil Ahmed | 25,903 | 24.01 | |
| TLP | Muhammad Siddique | 2,466 | 2.29 | |
| Independent | Muhammad Asad Yar | 1,449 | 1.34 | |
| Independent | Muhammad Safdar Khan Laghari | 1,147 | 1.06 | |
| Others | Others (nine candidates) | 3,664 | 3.39 | |
| Turnout | | 111,742 | 50.13 | |
| Total valid votes | | 107,897 | 96.56 | |
| Rejected ballots | | 3,845 | 3.44 | |
| Majority | | 19,698 | 18.25 | |
| Registered electors | | 222,915 | | |
| hold | | | | |

== General elections 2018 ==
Provincial election 2018: PP-265 Rahim Yar Khan-XI
| Party | Candidate | Votes | % | ±% |
|---|---|---|---|---|
| PPP | Rais Nabeel Ahmed | 39,823 | 43.19 | |
| PML(N) | Muhammad Safdar Khan Laghari | 26,856 | 29.13 | |
| PTI | Jam Allah Yar Walana | 18,136 | 19.67 | |
| TLP | Balqees Bibi | 1,518 | 1.65 | |
| Independent | Aoun Muhammad Khan Laghari | 1,505 | 1.63 | |
| AAT | Shoukat Ali | 1,146 | 1.24 | |
| Others | Others (six candidates) | 3,223 | 3.50 | |
| Turnout | | 95,844 | 56.27 | |
| Total valid votes | | 92,207 | 96.21 | |
| Rejected ballots | | 3,637 | 3.79 | |
| Majority | | 12,967 | 14.06 | |
| Registered electors | | 170,340 | | |

== General elections 2013 ==
Provincial election 2013: PP-295 Rahim Yar Khan-XI
| Party | Candidate | Votes | % | ±% |
|---|---|---|---|---|
| PPP | Makhdoom Syed Murtaza Mehmood | 52,318 | 60.91 | |
| Independent | Muhammad Safdar Khan Laghari | 19,814 | 23.07 | |
| PTI | Rao Atta Ur Rehman Khan | 11,564 | 13.46 | |
| Others | Others (seven candidates) | 2,191 | 2.55 | |
| Turnout | | 88,139 | 54.52 | |
| Total valid votes | | 85,887 | 97.44 | |
| Rejected ballots | | 2,252 | 2.56 | |
| Majority | | 32,504 | 37.84 | |
| Registered electors | | 161,650 | | |

== General elections 2008 ==
| Contesting candidates | Party affiliation | Votes polled |

== See also ==
- PP-266 Rahim Yar Khan-XII
- PP-268 Muzaffargarh-I
