= Hina Rabbani Khar =

Pakistani politician

Jinda Hina Rabbani Khar
- حنا ربانی کھر
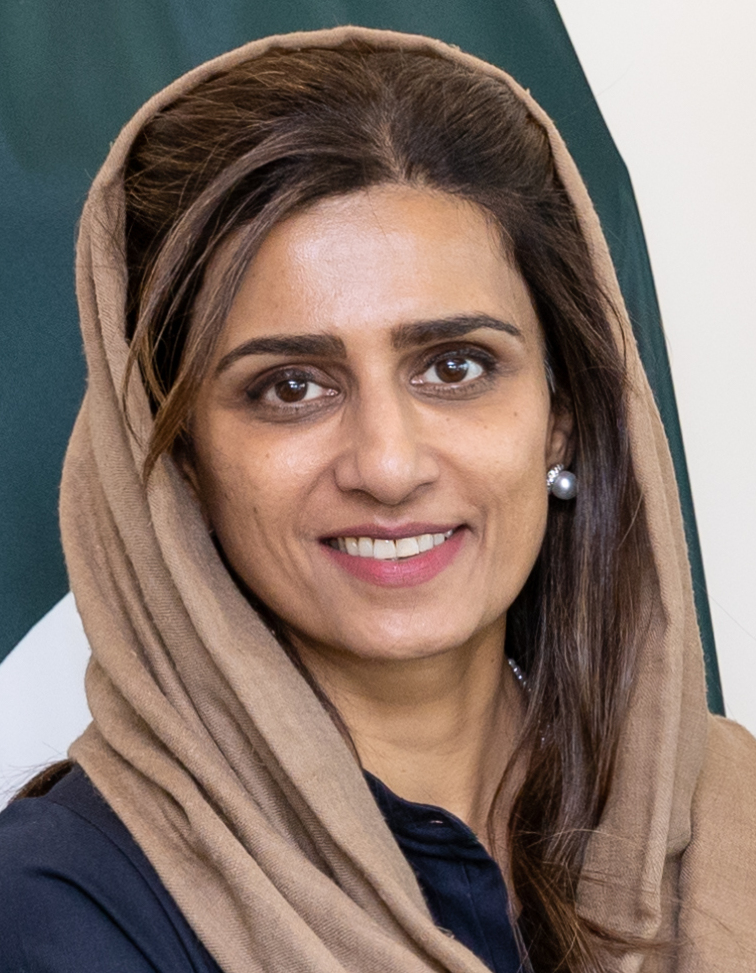
- Khar in 2023

Minister of State for Foreign Affairs
- In office 19 April 2022 – 10 August 2023
- Prime Minister: Shehbaz Sharif
- Minister: Bilawal Bhutto Zardari
- Preceded by: Nawabzada Malik Amad Khan
- In office 11 February 2011 – 19 July 2011
- Prime Minister: Yusuf Raza Gillani
- Preceded by: Nawabzada Malik Amad Khan
- Succeeded by: Nawabzada Malik Amad Khan

Minister of Foreign Affairs
- In office 19 July 2011 – 16 March 2013
- Prime Minister: Yusuf Raza Gillani; Raja Pervez Ashraf
- Preceded by: Shah Mehmood Qureshi
- Succeeded by: Mir Hazar Khan Khoso (Acting); Sartaj Aziz (de facto)

Minister of State for Finance
- In office 24 March 2008 – 11 February 2011
- Prime Minister: Yusuf Raza Gillani
- Preceded by: Ali Nazary
- Succeeded by: Dost Muhammad Mazari

Member of the National Assembly
- Incumbent
- Assumed office 29 February 2024
- Constituency: Reserved seat for women
- In office 13 August 2018 – 10 August 2023
- Constituency: Reserved seat for women
- In office 25 May 2013 – 25 May 2018
- Constituency: Reserved seat for women
- In office 17 March 2008 – 16 March 2013
- Constituency: NA-177 (Muzaffargarh-II)
- In office 16 November 2002 – 15 November 2007
- Constituency: NA-177 (Muzaffargarh-II)

Personal details
- Born: 19 November 1977 (age 48) Multan, Punjab, Pakistan
- Party: PPP (2008-present)
- Other political affiliations: PML(Q) (2002-2008)
- Spouse: Feroze Gulzar (m. 1999)
- Children: 3
- Parent: Ghulam Rabbani Khar (father)
- Relatives: Ghulam Mustafa Khar (uncle)
- Education: Lahore University of Management Sciences; University of Massachusetts

Hina Rabbani Khar (Note: Urdu: حنا ربانی کھر) (born 19 November 1977) is a Pakistani politician who served as Minister of State for Foreign Affairs from 2022 to 2023. She previously served as Foreign Minister of Pakistan from July 2011 to March 2013, the first and only woman to hold the position, and was a member of the National Assembly from 2018 to 2023.

Khar is a member of an influential Punjab feudal family in Muzaffargarh. She studied business at LUMS and University of Massachusetts Amherst before entering politics as a member of the national assembly in 2002, representing the PML-Q and becoming a junior minister responsible for economic policy under the Prime Minister Shaukat Aziz. In 2009, after switching parties and winning re-election with the Pakistan Peoples Party, she became the Minister of State for Finance and Economic Affairs and the same year became the first woman to present the national budget.^{[5]} She was appointed by Prime Minister Yousaf Raza Gillani as the Foreign Minister of Pakistan in July 2011, and served until shortly before the 2013 election, when she retired from active politics. She has continued to push for stronger ties with India.

She remains a member of the Pakistan People's Party, and is a public speaker on foreign policy. As of 2019, she was a Member of the National Assembly of Pakistan on a reserved seat for women.

== Early life and family ==
Hina Rabbani Khar was born on 19 November 1977 in Multan, Punjab, Pakistan into a Khar clan, part of the larger Kharal tribe of Punjabis. Khar is the daughter of the powerful feudal landlord and politician Ghulam Noor Rabbani Khar. Her father was a prominent national politician and served as a member of the National Assembly. She is a niece of Ghulam Mustafa Khar, the former Governor and Chief Minister of Punjab.

=== Education ===
Khar is a graduate of the Lahore University of Management Sciences (LUMS) where she holds a BSc (with honors) in Economics conferred in 1999. She subsequently studied in Isenberg School of Management at University of Massachusetts Amherst, where she earned an MSc in Business Management in 2002.

Khar has retained ties with LUMS since her graduation. In 2012, she delivered a lecture there on "Foreign Policy and Young Democracy", and secured funding for the Abdus Salam Institute of Physics.

== Political career ==
In the 2002 general elections, Khar was elected as a member of the National Assembly, representing the NA-177 (Muzaffargarh-II) constituency in Punjab. Her father, veteran politician Ghulam Noor Rabbani Khar, had represented the constituency previously, but he and most of the members of her family had been disqualified. A new law requiring all parliamentary candidates to hold a university degree meant that he and they could not run that year. With the financial support of her father who addressed rallies on her behalf, she campaigned on a newly founded PML-Q platform against the Pakistan Muslim League, with her face not appearing on her own election posters.

=== Economic and Finance positions ===
Khar came to prominence during the Shaukat Aziz government and was appointed Parliamentary Secretary for Economic Affairs and Statistics in 2003, and being named Minister of State for Economic Affairs the following year, a post she retained until 2007. As minister of state, she worked with international relief funds and charities after the deadly 2005 earthquake in Northern Pakistan, and also worked on proposals for the Turkmenistan–Afghanistan–Pakistan–India pipeline.

In 2007, she made an unsuccessful attempt to renew her alliance with the PML-Q, but the party denied her a ticket platform to campaign for re-election in 2008. She was subsequently invited to join the Pakistan Peoples Party (PPP) and successfully campaigned for her constituency for a second time. The PPP secured a plurality of the votes and formed a left-wing alliance with the Awami National Party, MQM and PML-Q.

==== Minister of State for Finance and Economic Affairs ====
After her 2008 re-election, she was appointed Minister of State for Finance and Economic Affairs in the cabinet of Yousaf Raza Gillani. She worked on the financial budget and economic policies in the absence of the then Finance Minister and on 13 June 2009 she successfully presented the 2010 federal budget in the Parliament and has the distinction of being the first woman politician to present the Pakistani budget in the National Assembly. She also worked on reducing Pakistan's circular debt within the energy sector.

=== Foreign minister ===
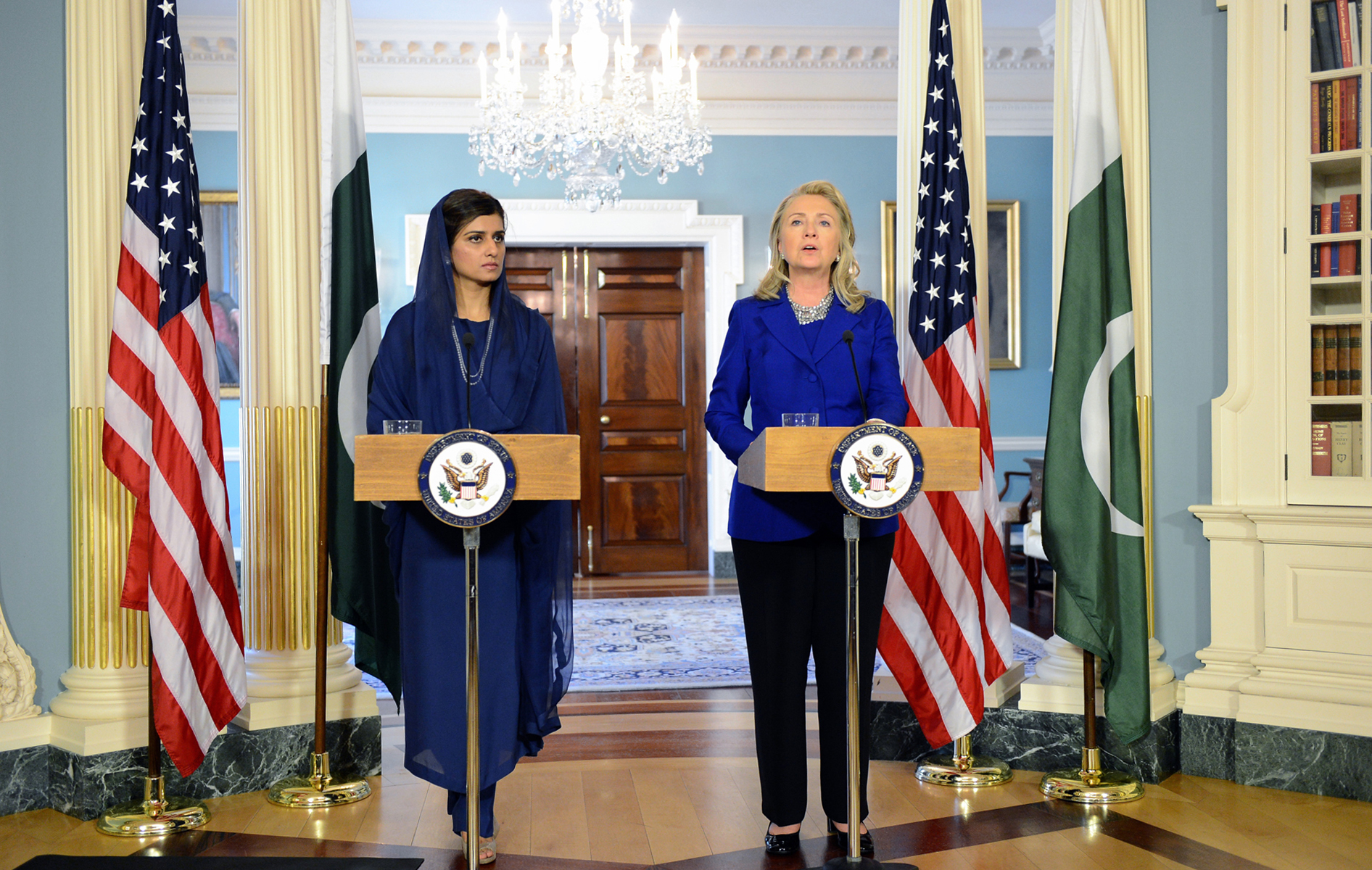
Khar with United States Secretary of State Hillary Clinton

Khar was appointed as Minister of State for Foreign Affairs—the deputy head of the Ministry of Foreign Affairs—on 11 February 2011, as part of Gillani's cabinet reshuffle. Gillani did not reappoint Shah Mehmood Qureshi as Foreign Minister, and that position was left empty. In the absence of any Foreign Minister, she was the acting Minister of Foreign Affairs for five months until her formal appointment as Foreign Minister on 18 July; she was sworn in on 19 July, becoming the youngest and first female Minister of Foreign Affairs. President Asif Ali Zardari, who succeeded Pervez Musharraf in 2008, said the appointment was "a demonstration of the government's commitment to bring women into the mainstream of national life". She was appointed foreign minister during a difficult time in Pakistan: when the country's armed forces were confronting extreme elements in Western Pakistan and anti-American emotions ran high over the Raymond Davis incident.

Shortly after her appointment, Khar visited India and held peace talks with her Indian counterpart, S. M. Krishna. Relations between the two countries had been suspended following the 2008 Mumbai attacks, and did not resume until February 2011, five months before her visit. The Indian media reported extensively on her fashion and appearance, including her Birkin bag, sunglasses, Jimmy Choo stilettos and pearl necklaces. She held talks with leaders of the Hurriyat Conference before meeting Indian government representatives, a decision which was criticised by the Bharatiya Janata Party (BJP), India's biggest political party, which said it was a breach of protocol and demanded an inquiry into the matter. She later led an unsuccessful move to grant India most favoured nation status. In August 2011 she visited China and held talks with Yang Jiechi, the Chinese Foreign Minister. Hindustan Times reported that, in contrast to her reception in India, she was largely ignored by the Chinese media.

The NATO strike which killed 24 Pakistani troops was one of the most notable incidents during her tenure and Foreign Minister Khar stated that the government of Pakistan and defense committees had approved a measure—similar to a parliamentary resolution put forward after bin Laden's May 2011 death—that formally bars NATO and ISAF forces from using Pakistan's supply routes. Pakistan continued to demand a U.S. apology, and on 6 June 2012, Khar argued that "higher principles should take precedence over politically popular considerations", and challenged the U.S. to "live up to its democratic ideals by respecting the will of Pakistan’s elected legislature". On 15 December 2011, when the United States suspended financial aid to Pakistan, Khar warned that their actions would be responsible for losing the war on terror, since Pakistan could not win without U.S. assistance.

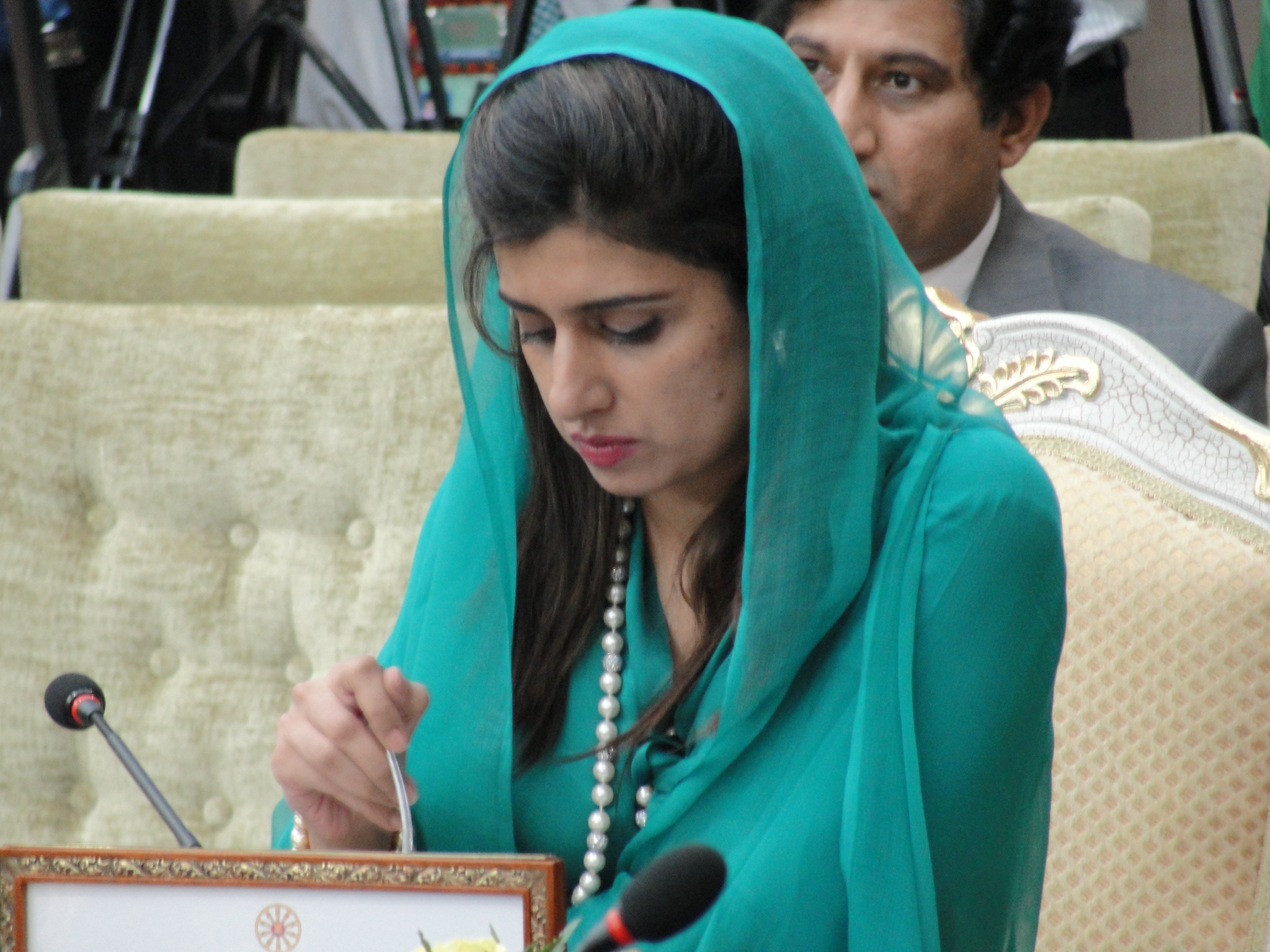
Hina Rabbani Khar – Supreme Court of Pakistan Conference in 2013.

On 21 January 2012, Khar secretly left for Moscow with an agenda of strengthening bilateral relations, with Pakistan's relationship with the United States strained. On this trip invited the Russian leadership to visit Pakistan and to maintain bilateral cooperation and commitment and support for "Afghan-led and Afghan-owned" efforts for peace in the country. On 12 August 2012, while speaking at the 16th Summit of the Non-Aligned Movement in Tehran, Khar maintained that regional stability was imperiled due to the increasing tensions relating to Iran's nuclear program, and a "peaceful resolution of this issue is still possible on the basis of reciprocal confidence-building measures and security assurances against external threats".

During her short visit to Bangladesh on 9 November 2012, Khar was approached by the Foreign Minister of Bangladesh Dipu Moni to sort out post-independence issues between the countries. Khar called for the two countries to move ahead together.

While the election was being scheduled, the PPP completed five-year election term in March 2013, so the government was replaced by a caretaker prime minister and cabinet, in which Khar was not a member, until the election took place. This ended Khar's two-year role as Foreign Minister. In April 2013, Khar announced that she was standing down at the next general election, so that her father, who had previously been ineligible to stand as a candidate, could succeed her. The condition requiring parliamentary candidates to hold a university degree, which had led to Khar replacing her father in 2002, had been lifted since the most recent general election. The PPP came second in the election, losing 74 seats; Khar's father was defeated in his bid to regain his former seat, although he was able to regain the seat in a by-election held later that year.

==== Significance ====
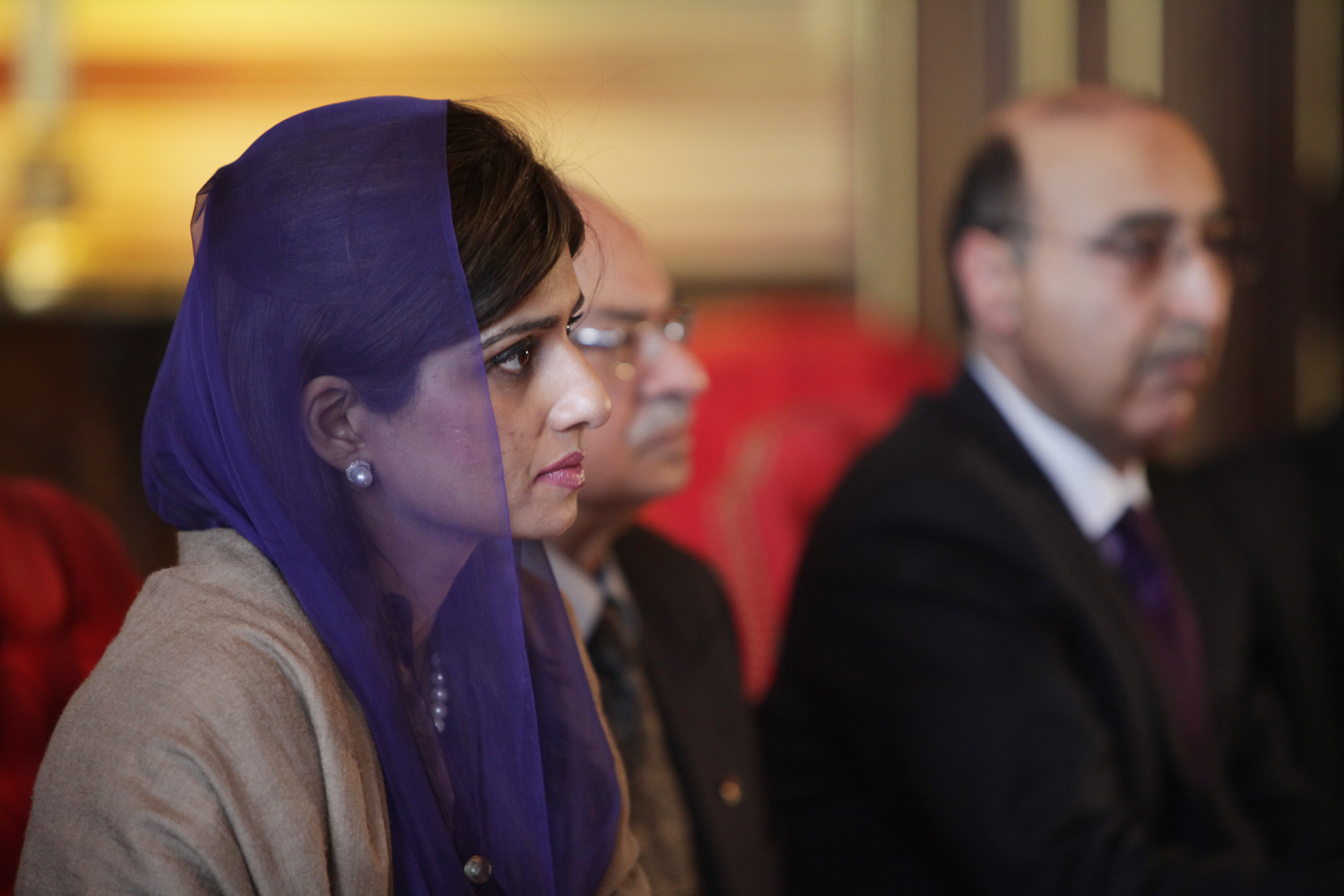
Khar at the Enhanced Strategic Dialogue Review in London.

She is widely credited for her role as the youngest and first ever female Foreign Minister in Pakistan. She assumed her role in July 2011 as the 26th Foreign Minister of Pakistan. During her two-year-long appointment as the country's foreign minister she attracted significant global attention on her status as Pakistan's first woman foreign minister. She was interviewed by Charlie Rose, CBS News and Washington Post among others. She served as a high-ranking member of the Central Executive Committee of the Pakistan Peoples Party from 2008 until 2013, when she retired from politics. She is widely regarded as one of the highest ranking women in Pakistani politics.

=== Post-ministerial career ===
Since standing down, Khar has been an active public speaker. In an interview with Al Jazeera in December 2015, she accused the US government supporting military regimes in Pakistan. She has written op-ed's for Newsweek Pakistan and was interviewed by Mehdi Hasan at the Oxford Union in December 2015. In June 2016, she appeared on Jirga with Saleem Safi, speaking out against Pakistan's aggressive stance in the Kashmir conflict. In an appearance at the Islamabad Literature Festival, she continued her support of a closer Indian-Pakistan relationship.

=== Return to politics in 2018 ===
She was elected on a reserved seat for women in the National Assembly in the 2018 General Election by the Pakistan People's Party. On 19 April 2022 she was inducted in Shehbaz Ministry having the post of Minister of state for foreign affairs.

In a Pakistani memo leaked by the Pentagon, she argues that Pakistan can “no longer try to maintain a middle ground between China and the United States.” It warns that the instinct to preserve Pakistan's partnership with the United States would ultimately sacrifice the full benefits of the country's “real strategic” partnership with China.

== Personal life ==
Khar is married to Feroze Gulzar. She has a son, Ahmed, and two daughters, Annaya and Dina.

Khar is co-owner of a restaurant called the "Polo Lounge". The initial branch opened at the Lahore Polo Ground in 2002. A second Polo Lounge has since opened in Islamabad's Saidpur Village.

Khar has been subjected to criticism with regards to dynastic politics in Pakistan. Coming from a feudal but mostly illiterate family of politicians, she won her first seat in the national assembly from the same constituency her father represented before he was disqualified due to not having a university degree, and the same happened to many other members of the family, who were seasoned politicians. Her father's brother also served as the Governor and CM of Punjab for the same political party. This case was further brought to light when Khar introduced her brother as the new candidate for her family's constituency.

Khar, along 25 other members of her family were booked in a case of forgery in Muzaffargarh where her step-brother stated that the family has used political influence to illegally transfer his property to their name.

== See also ==
- Economy of Pakistan

== Notes ==
Political offices
Preceded by Ali Nazary	Minister of State for Finance and Economic Affairs; 2008–2011	Succeeded by Dost Muhammad Mazari
Preceded by Nawabzada Malik Amad Khan	Minister of State for Foreign Affairs; 2011	Succeeded by Nawabzada Malik Amad Khan
Preceded by Shah Mehmood Qureshi	Minister of Foreign Affairs; 2011–2013	Succeeded by Mir Hazar Khan Khoso; Acting
