= Nawabzada Mansoor Ahmed Khan =

Pakistani politician

Member of the Provincial Assembly of the Punjab
- In office 15 August 2018 – 14 January 2023
- Constituency: PP-271 Muzaffargarh-IV

Personal details
- Born: 10 August 1953 (age 72) Khangarh, Punjab, Pakistan
- Party: PTI (2018-present)
- Parent: Nawabzada Nasrullah Khan (father)
- Relatives: Nawabzada Iftikhar Ahmed Khan Babar (brother)

Nawabzada Mansoor Ahmed Khan (Urdu: نوابزادہ منصور احمد خان) is a Pakistani politician who had been a member of the Provincial Assembly of Punjab from August 2018 till January 2023. He was the Minister of Revenue of Punjab under Pervaiz Elahi.

== Early life and education ==
Nawabzada Mansoor Ahmed Khan was born on August 10, 1953, to Nawabzada Nasrullah Khan at Khangarh, Punjab. He has graduated from College and he is an agriculturist. He has traveled to the UK, Iran, and Saudi Arabia. His father, Nawabzada Nasrullah Khan was a Member of Punjab Legislative Assembly during 1951-55; Member of National Assembly for four terms during 1962-64, 1977, 1988–90 and 1993-96 and also served as Chairman of Kashmir Committee. Mansoor's brother, Iftikhar Ahmed Khan Babar is a member of PPP and is a sitting MNA.

== Political career ==
He served as a member of the Provincial Assembly of Punjab for four consecutive terms during 1988-99. He had served as Minister of Revenue for two terms during 1990-93 and 1993-96.

He was re-elected to the Provincial Assembly of Punjab as a candidate of the Pakistan Tehreek-e-Insaf from PP-271 (Muzaffargarh-IV) in the 2018 Punjab provincial election.

He ran for a seat in the Provincial Assembly from PP-275 Muzaffargarh-VIII as a candidate of the PTI in the 2024 Punjab provincial election, but lost the election.

== Family Tree ==
Nawabzada Nasrullah Khan
Nawabzada Mansoor Ahmed Khan	Iftikhar Ahmed Khan Babar
