= Chowk Sarwar Shaheed Tehsil =

Tehsil in Punjab, Pakistan

Chowk Sarwar Shaheed Tehsil تحصیل چوک سرور شہید Chowk Munda
- Tehsil
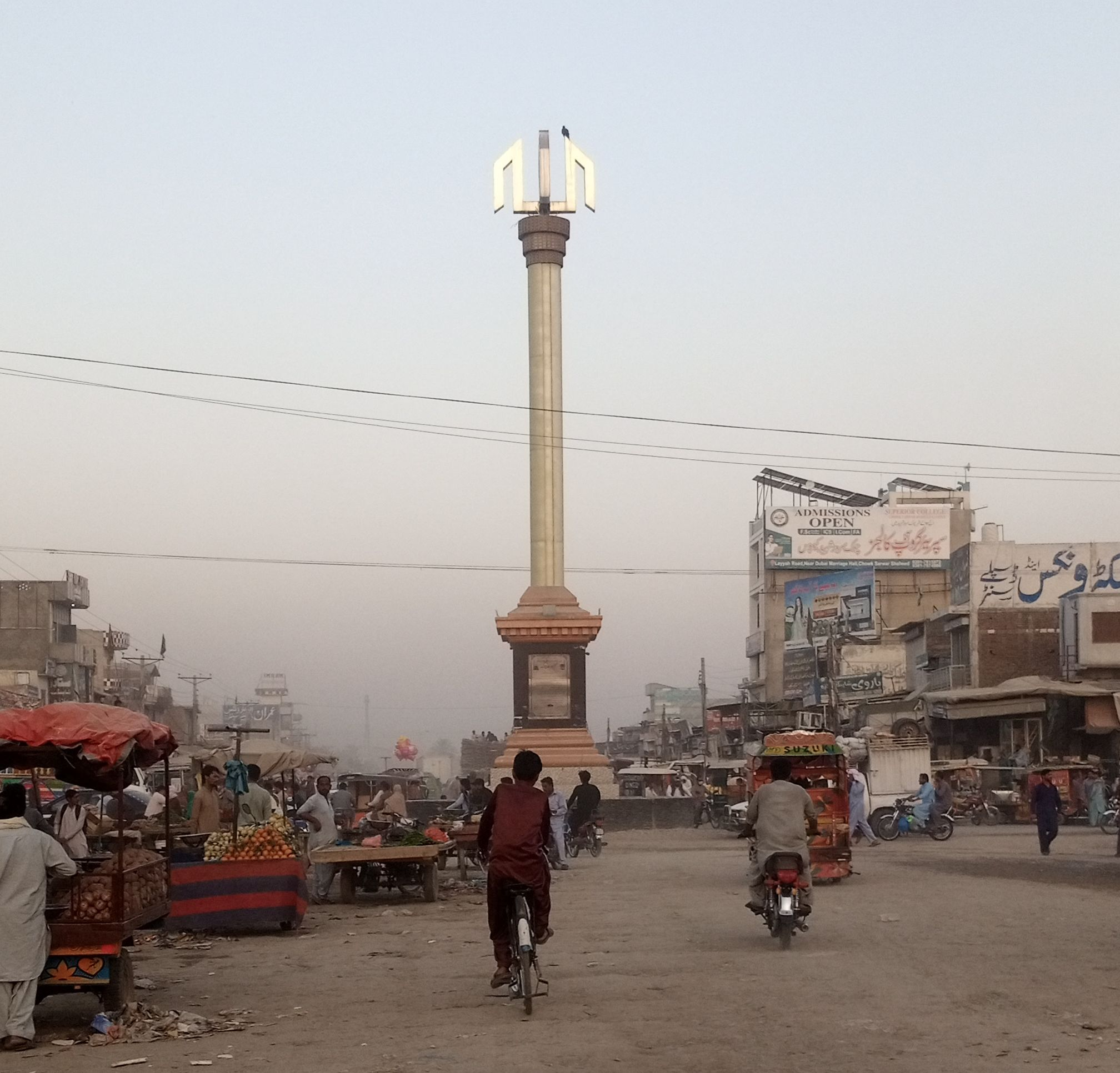
- Chowk Munda

- Location in Pakistan Chowk Sarwar Shaheed Tehsil (Pakistan)
- Coordinates: 30.5808929°N 71.2356828°E
- Country: Pakistan
- Region: (Punjab, Pakistan) Punjab
- District: Kot Addu
- Towns: 1
- Union councils: -

Area
  - Tehsil: 1,785 km^{2} (689 sq mi)

Population (2023)
  - Tehsil: 414,578
  - Density: 232.3/km^{2} (601.5/sq mi)
  - Urban: 63,421 (15.30%)
  - Rural: 351,157 (84.70%)

Literacy (2023)
  - Literacy rate: 55.50%
- Time zone: UTC+5 (PST)
  - Summer (DST): UTC+6 (PDT)
- Postal code: 34030
- Area code: 66
- Website: http://tehsilchowkmunda.blogspot.com

Chowk Sarwar Shaheed (Urdu: تحصیل چوک سرور شہید), previously known as Chowk Munda, is a tehsil in Kot Addu District, Punjab, Pakistan. Chowk Sarwar Shaheed is the headquarters of the tehsil.

== Demographics ==
=== Population ===
Historical population
Year	Pop.	±% p.a.
1951	...	—
1961	...	—
1972	...	—
1981	...	—
1998	...	—
2017	365,714	—
2023	414,578	+2.11%

As of the 2023 census, Chowk Sarwar Shaheed Tehsil had a population of 615,476. Out of which, Urban population is 63,421 which is nearly 15.30% and rural population is 351,157 which is nearly 84.70%.
