= Malik Ahmad Yar Hunjra =

Pakistani politician

- ملک احمد یار ہنجرا

Member of the Provincial Assembly of the Punjab
- In office 2002 – 31 May 2018

Personal details
- Born: 6 March 1960 (age 66) Muzaffargarh District, Punjab, Pakistan
- Party: PMLN (2013-present)
- Other political affiliations: PMLQ (2002-2013)
- Relatives: Malik Ghulam Qasim Hanjra (brother); Sultan Mehmood (uncle)

Malik Ahmad Yar Hunjra (born on 6th March 1960) is a Pakistani politician who was a Member of the Provincial Assembly of the Punjab, from 2002 to May 2018.

== Early life and education ==
He was born on 6 March 1978 in Muzaffargarh District.

He graduated from Government College University where he was enrolled between 1997 and 2000. He obtained the degree of Master of Business Administration in Finance from Quaid-i-Azam University in 2003 and graduated in Law from Bahauddin Zakariya University. He has the degree of Bachelor of Laws. He belongs to a political family of South Punjab whose head is Sultan Mehmood Hunjra.

== Political career ==
He was elected to the Provincial Assembly of the Punjab as a candidate of Pakistan Muslim League (Q) (PML-Q) from Constituency PP-251 (Muzaffargarh-I) in the 2002 Pakistani general election. He received 21,695 votes and defeated Mufti Abdul Jalil, a candidate of Muttahida Majlis-e-Amal (MMA). In the same election, he ran for the seat of the National Assembly of Pakistan as an independent candidate from Constituency NA-176 (Muzaffargarh-I) but was unsuccessful. He received 2,823 votes and lost the seat to Khalida Mohsin Ali Qureshi, a candidate of Pakistan Peoples Party (PPP).

He was re-elected to the Provincial Assembly of the Punjab as a candidate of PML-Q from Constituency PP-251 (Muzaffargarh-I) in the 2008 Pakistani general election. He received 19,913 votes and defeated Malik Muhammad Yousaf Hinjra, a candidate of PPP.

He was re-elected to the Provincial Assembly of the Punjab as a candidate of Pakistan Muslim League (N) from Constituency PP-251 (Muzaffargarh-I) in the 2013 Pakistani general election. He received 33,502 votes and defeated Muhammad Ashraf Khan Rind, a candidate of Pakistan Tehreek-e-Insaf (PTI). In November 2016, he was inducted into the provincial Punjab cabinet of Chief Minister Shehbaz Sharif and was made Provincial Minister of Punjab for Prisons.
