= Amjad Hameed Khan Dasti =

Sardar Amjad Hameed Khan Dasti

Member of the Provincial Assembly of the Punjab
- In office 2002–2007

Personal details
- Born: 6 June 1918 Gurdaspur, British India
- Died: 11 December 2012
- Spouse(s): Zakia Begum, Begum Noor Jahan
- Children: Samina Dasti, Tehmina Dasti, Arfa Amjad, Yasmeen Dasti, Asiya Dasti, Kinza Mehtab
- Parent: Abdul Hamid Khan Dasti (father)

Sardar Amjad Hameed Khan Dasti (1918–2012) was Member Punjab Assembly 2002–2007 (14th Assembly). He was son of Abdul Hamid Khan Dasti.

Sardar Amjad Hameed Khan Dasti, son of Sardar Abdul Hameed Khan Dasti, was born on 7 June 1918 at Gurdaspur, India. He obtained the degree of LL.B. in 1941 from University of the Punjab, Lahore. His political career started as zealous worker of Pakistan Movement and was imprisoned in 1946 in District Jail, Multan for which he was awarded with a Gold Medal.

A practising lawyer and an agriculturist, who served as Vice-Chairman, Municipal Committee and as Member District Board, Muzaffargarh for five years. He represented Pakistan at the regional cooperative Seminars held in India, Singapore and Czechoslovakia. He served as Member Provincial Assembly of the Punjab during 1972-77, 1985–88, 1988–90, 1990–93, 1993–96 and 1997-99.

He was nominated Member, Federal Council/Majlis-e-Shoora during Zia-ul-Haq regime. He had also functioned as Minister for Food and Agriculture and as Minister for Finance. He had returned to Punjab Assembly for the seventh term in General Elections 2002. His father served as Provincial Minister during 1948-58 in every cabinet of the Punjab and West Pakistan; and also functioned as Chief Minister, Punjab before One Unit.
