= Alliance for Restoration of Democracy =

The Alliance for the Restoration of Democracy (ARD) was an alliance of the two then largest political parties in Pakistan – the Pakistan People’s Party and the Pakistan Muslim League (N) formed on 3 December 2000. The two parties had been known to be Pakistan’s mainstream moderate parties, and together represented the majority of Pakistan’s electorate at that time.

The ARD was created to campaign for Pakistan’s return to civilian rule after the 1999 military coup led by General Musharraf and was reported to include over a dozen political parties. The alliance believed that the people of Pakistan deserved nothing less than an opportunity to freely elect leaders that represented their views and ideals.

There had been corruption cases and allegations against both political party leaders, but they continued to remain unproven and widely accepted to be politically motivated. Makhdoom Amin Fahim resigned from the presidency of the ARD on 24 March 2008, and Rao Javed Ali Khan became the acting Chairman of ARD. The ARD was later disbanded because it was never able to mobilize popular support against the Pervez Musharraf government. Later, both major parties of Pakistan, PML (N) and PPP, contested the 2008 Pakistani general election independently.
