= Abdul Hamid Khan Dasti =

Pakistani politician

- عبدالحمید خان دستی
- Sardar Abdul Hamid Khan Dasti in 1949

4th Chief Minister of West Punjab
- In office 21 May 1955 – 14 October 1955
- Governor: Mushtaq Gurmani
- Preceded by: Feroz Khan Noon
- Succeeded by: Position abolished (1955); Malik Meraj Khalid (1972)

Personal details
- Children: Amjad Hamid Khan Dasti (son)

Abdul Hamid Khan Dasti was a Pakistani politician who served as the fourth chief minister of West Punjab from May to October 1955, when the province was merged into West Pakistan.

== Family and personal life ==
Sardar Abdul Hamid Khan Dasti was born in Muzaffargarh in 1895, the second of seven sons of Allah Yaar Khan Dasti and Ghulam Jannat. He and his wife, Amatullah, would go on to have three sons, two daughters, and thirteen grandchildren, some of whom would follow in his footsteps to serve their country in politics. He was a keen traveler and bridge player, who enjoyed poetry and writing. He was an avid reader, and built an extensive personal library. Throughout his life he maintained an active and healthy lifestyle.

== Public and political career ==
Sardar Abdul Hamid Khan Dasti started his professional life as a lawyer in Gurdaspurin 1917. He moved to Muzaffargarh soon after, where he was appointed as Public Prosecutor.

An interest in politics steered him towards the Unionist Party in 1925, which he left in 1945 to join the Muslim League. He was elected as a Member of the Punjab Assembly in 1955 (need source). In May, 1955, he became Chief Minister of the Punjab, a position which he briefly held till October of that year.

As a prominent member of the Muslim League party, Sardar Abdul Hamid Khan Dasti was closely associated with Mr. Muhammad Ali Jinnah, Pakistan's founding father, or Quaid-e-Azam, as well as with Allama Sir Muhammad Iqbal, the national poet, philosopher, scholar and visionary, who happened to be his professor at Government College Lahore. It was at the latter institution where Sardar Dasti obtained an M.A. in Urdu and Persian.

Some of his contemporaries who were prominent in national and provincial politics included Chaudhary Zafrullah, Nawab Mushtaq Gurmani, Jamal Leghari, Ashiq Qureshi, Nawab Muzaffar Khan, Nawab Ameer Muhammad Khan, and Mian Mumtaz Daultana.

The military coup of 1958, which dissolved the assemblies and abrogated the 1956 constitution debarred nearly all of the country's politicians, including Sardar Abdul Hamid Khan Dasti, from taking part in politics. Despite the prohibition, Dasti maintained an active interest in internal party politics.

He was an active supporter of Mohtarama Fatima Jinnah (Mr. Jinnah's sister and Pakistan's First lady), in her national campaign against President Field Marshal Ayub Khan during the 1964 elections. He also campaigned for his son, Sardar Amajd Hamid Khan Dasti when the latter launched his political career in the Muslim League.

== Retirement and death ==
Sardar Abdul Hamid Khan Dasti did not re-enter politics following the restoration of democracy in the early 1970s, and chose to retire instead. He remained a very active patron and supporter of the Dasti clan in Muzaffargarh, mediating disputes, offering advice, and interceding with authorities on behalf of clan members, as well as the larger local community. He also loved tending to his mango orchards, and became somewhat of an expert in mango cultivation.

He died on 11 February 1985.

Political offices
Preceded by Feroz Khan Noon	Chief Minister of Punjab; 1955–1955	Succeeded by Malik Meraj Khalid
