= Kot Addu Tehsil =

Kot Addu Tehsil تحصِيل كوٹ ادُّو
- Tehsil
- Shrine of Hazrat Baba in Noor Shah, Kot Addu
- Country: Pakistan
- Region: (Punjab, Pakistan) Punjab
- District: Kot Addu
- Towns: 6
- Union councils: 32

Area
  - Tehsil: 1,686 km^{2} (651 sq mi)

Population (2023)
  - Tehsil: 1,072,180
  - Density: 635.9/km^{2} (1,647/sq mi)
  - Urban: 220,398 (20.56%)
  - Rural: 851,782 (79.44%)

Literacy (2023)
  - Literacy rate: 58.19%
- Time zone: UTC+5 (PST)
  - Summer (DST): UTC+6 (PDT)

Kot Addu (Urdu: كوٹ ادُّو), is a tehsil located in Kot Addu District, Punjab, Pakistan. The city of Kot-Addu is the headquarters of the tehsil which is administratively subdivided into 32 Union Councils.

== Demographics ==
=== Population ===
Historical population
Year	Pop.	±% p.a.
1951	143,009	—
1961	184,639	+2.59%
1972	313,137	+4.92%
1981	449,493	+4.10%
1998	808,438	+3.51%
2017	981,787	+1.03%
2023	1,072,180	+1.48%

As of the 2023 census, Kot Addu Tehsil has population of 1,072,180.

== See also ==
- Manhhan Sharif
