= Kot Addu District =

District in Punjab, Pakistan

Kot Addu District ضِلع کوٹ ادُو
- District of Punjab
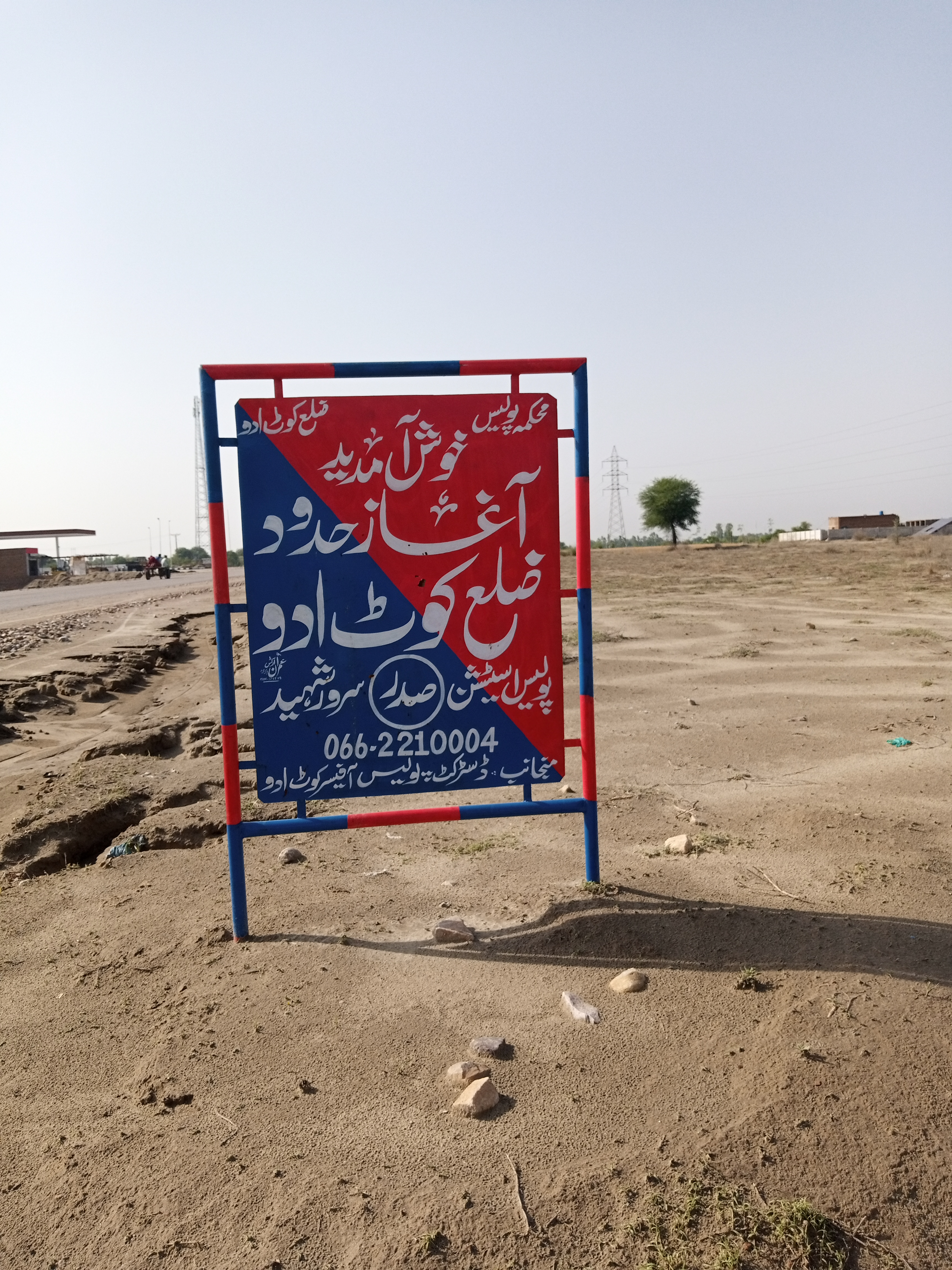
- A board marking the boundary of Kot Addu district

- Country: Pakistan
- Province: Punjab
- Division: Dera Ghazi Khan
- Headquarters: Kot Addu

Government
  - Type: District Administration
  - Deputy Commissioner: Jawad Haidar Shah

Area
  - District of Punjab: 3,471 km^{2} (1,340 sq mi)

Population (2023)
  - District of Punjab: 1,486,758
  - Density: 428.3/km^{2} (1,109/sq mi)
  - Urban: 283,819 (19.20%)
  - Rural: 1,202,939 (80.80%)
- Time zone: UTC+5 (PST)
- Area code: 066
- Number of Tehsils: 2
- Website: https://mckotaddu.lgpunjab.org.pk

Kot Addu District (Note: Urdu: ضِلع کوٹ ادُو) is a district in the Punjab province of Pakistan. The district headquarter is Kot Addu city.

== History ==
Kot Addu was established by Addu Khan, son of the Mirani chieftain Ghazi Khan, in the 15th century. Kot Addu was part of Muzaffargarh District as Kot Addu Tehsil until 2022, after which it was upgraded to district level.

== Administration ==
The district is administratively subdivided into two tehsils.

Tehsil	Area (km^{2})	Pop. (2023)	Density (ppl/km^{2}) (2023)	Literacy rate (2023)	Union Councils
Chowk Sarwar Shaheed	1,785	414,578	232.26	55.50%	
Kot Addu	1,686	1,072,180	635.93	58.19%	32

== Demographics ==
Historical population
Year	Pop.	±% p.a.
1951	143,009	—
1961	184,639	+2.59%
1972	313,137	+4.92%
1981	449,493	+4.10%
1998	808,438	+3.51%
2017	1,347,501	+2.73%
2023	1,486,758	+1.65%

As of the 2023 census, Kot Addu district has 251,512 households and a population of 1,486,758. The district has a sex ratio of 100.85 males to 100 females and a literacy rate of 57.44%: 66.23% for males and 48.47% for females. 432,584 (29.12% of the surveyed population) are under 10 years of age. 283,819 (19.09%) live in urban areas.

Religion in Layyah district (2023)
Religion	Percent
Islam	99.43%
Christianity	0.50%
Other or not stated	0.07%

Religion in contemporary Kot Addu District
Religious group	1941		2017		2023	
Religious group	Pop.	%	Pop.	%	Pop.	%
Islam	117,505	87.96%	1,341,598	99.56%	1,476,968	99.43%
Hinduism (Note: 1941 census: Including Ad-Dharmis)	14,303	10.71%	401	0.03%	428	0.03%
Sikhism	1,720	1.29%	—N/a	—N/a	35	~0%
Christianity	52	0.04%	5,059	0.38%	7,498	0.50%
Ahmadi	—N/a	—N/a	413	0.03%	463	0.03%
Others (Note: Including Jainism, Buddhism, Zoroastrianism, Judaism, or not stated)	5	0%	175	0.01%	90	0.01%
Total Population	133,585	100%	1,347,501	100%	1,485,482	100%
Note: 1941 census data is for Kot Addu tehsil of Muzaffargarh District, which roughly corresponds to contemporary Kot Addu district. District and tehsil borders have changed since 1941.

Languages of Kot Addu district (2023)
1. Saraiki (79.8%)
2. Punjabi (11.6%)
3. Urdu (4.79%)
4. Pashto (2.66%)
5. Others (1.15%)

At the 2023 census, 79.80% of the population spoke Saraiki, 11.60% Punjabi, 4.79% Urdu and 2.66% Pashto as their first language.

== See also ==
- Divisions of Pakistan
  - Divisions of Balochistan
  - Divisions of Khyber Pakhtunkhwa
  - Divisions of Punjab
  - Divisions of Sindh
  - Divisions of Azad Kashmir
  - Divisions of Gilgit-Baltistan
- Districts of Pakistan
  - Districts of Punjab, Pakistan
  - Districts of Sindh
  - Districts of Balochistan, Pakistan
  - Districts of Khyber Pakhtunkhwa
  - Districts of Azad Kashmir
  - Districts of Gilgit-Baltistan
