= Muzaffargarh Tehsil =

Pakistani administrative subdivision

Muzaffargarh Tehsil تحصِيل مظفرگڑھ
- Tehsil
- Country: Pakistan
- Region: Punjab, Pakistan
- District: Muzaffargarh
- Capital: Muzaffargarh
- Towns: 1
- Union councils: 35

Area
  - Tehsil: 2,377 km^{2} (918 sq mi)

Population (2023)
  - Tehsil: 1,905,995
  - Density: 801.8/km^{2} (2,077/sq mi)
  - Urban: 267,702 (14.05%)
  - Rural: 1,638,293 (85.95%)

Literacy (2023)
  - Literacy rate: Total: (46.84%); Male: (54.07%); Female: (39.23%)
- Time zone: UTC+5 (PST)
  - Summer (DST): UTC+6 (PDT)
- Postal code: 34200
- Area code: 066

Muzaffargarh Tehsil (Urdu: تحصِيل مظفرگڑھ), is a tehsil (an administrative subdivision) of Muzaffargarh District that falls in Dera Ghazi Khan Division, in the Punjab province of Pakistan.

== Administration ==
The tehsil of Muzaffargarh is administratively subdivided into 35 Union Councils. These are:

- Ahmed Mohana
- Aludaywall
- Baseera (Muzaffargarh)
- Basti Karak
- Brahimwall, Chak Ferazi
- Darain, Ganga
- Garey Wahin
- Ghazanfargarh
- Gul Wala
- Jaggatpur
- Karamdad Qureshi
- Khangarh
- Khanpur Shumali
- Lutkaran
- M.Garh City No.1
- M.Garh City No.2
- M.Garh City No.3
- Manika Bhutta
- Mehra Sherqi
- Mgarh City No.4
- Minkpur
- Muradabad
- Nohanwali
- Rangpur
- Rohillanwali
- Shah Jamal
- Sharif Chajrah
- Taleeri
- Thatha Qureshi
- Umer pur Janubi
- Usman Koria
- Uttra Sindeela
- Wah Pitafi

== Demographics ==
=== Population ===
Historical population
Year	Pop.	±% p.a.
1951	234,856	—
1961	290,986	+2.17%
1972	420,514	+3.40%
1981	574,892	+3.54%
1998	982,866	+3.20%
2017	1,625,487	+2.68%
2023	1,905,995	+2.69%

As of the 2023 census, Muzaffargarh tehsil has population of 1,905,995. Out of which, Urban population is 267,702 which is nearly 14.05% and rural population is 1,638,293.

As of the 2023 census, Muzaffargarh Tehsil has a total literacy rate of 46.84%, with male literacy at 54.07% and female literacy at 39.23%.
