= Chaubara =

Chaubara or Choubara may refer to:

== India ==
- Chaubara Dera No. 1, a Hindu temple in Khargone district, Madhya Pradesh
- Chaubara Dera No. 2, a Hindu temple in Khargone district, Madhya Pradesh
- Chaubara (watchtower), in Bidar, Karnataka

== Pakistan ==
- Chaubara, Pakistan a city in Punjab, Pakistan
- Chaubara Tehsil, a sub-division in Punjab
- Chajju Da Chaubara, a historic building in Lahore, Punjab
