= NA-181 Layyah-I =

Constituency of the National Assembly of Pakistan

- Constituency for the National Assembly of Pakistan
- Region: Karor Lal Esan Tehsil, Chaubara Tehsil, Thal Desert area and Layyah Tehsil (partly) of Layyah District
- Electorate: 574,258

Current constituency
- Party: Pakistan Tehreek-e-Insaf
- Member: Anbar Majeed Khan Niazi
- Created from: NA-187 Layyah-I

NA-181 Layyah-I (این اے-181، ليہ-1) is a constituency for the National Assembly of Pakistan.

== Election 2002 ==
General elections were held on 10 October 2002. Sardar Bahadur Ahmad Khan of PML-Q won by 86,427 votes.

General election 2002: NA-181 Layyah-I
Party	Candidate	Votes	%	±%
PML(Q)	Sardar Bahadur Ahmed Khan	86,247	56.28	
PML(N)	Faiz Ul Hassan	56,490	36.86	
PPP	Syed Mousa Raza Shah Naqvi	6,154	4.02	
MMA	Muhammad Rab Nawaz Farooqi	4,363	2.84	
Turnout		158,907	57.67	
Total valid votes		153,254	96.44	
Rejected ballots		5,653	3.56	
Majority		29,757	19.42	
Registered electors		275,563		

== Election 2008 ==
General elections were held on 18 February 2008. Sardar Bahadur Ahmad Khan of PML-Q won by 58,797 votes.

General election 2008: NA-181 Layyah-I
Party	Candidate	Votes	%	±%
PML(Q)	Sardar Bahadur Ahmed Khan	58,797	36.04	
PML(N)	Faiz Ul Hassan	56,951	34.90	
PPP	Ch. Altaf Hussain	46,149	28.28	
Others	Others (three candidates)	1,269	0.78	
Turnout		167,407	63.62	
Total valid votes		163,166	97.47	
Rejected ballots		4,241	2.53	
Majority		2,846	1.14	
Registered electors		263,128		
PML(Q) hold				

== Election 2013 ==
General elections were held on 11 May 2013. Faiz Ul Hassan of PML-N won by 119,403 votes and became the member of National Assembly.

General election 2013: NA-181 Layyah-I
Party	Candidate	Votes	%	±%
PML(N)	Faiz Ul Hassan	119,403	52.06	
PPP	Sardar Bahadur Ahmed Khan	81,393	35.48	
PTI	Naiz Muhammad Gujjar	20,699	9.02	
Others	Others (seven candidates)	7,881	3.44	
Turnout		238,975	68.64	
Total valid votes		229,376	95.98	
Rejected ballots		9,599	4.02	
Majority		38,010	16.58	
Registered electors		348,176		
PML(N) gain from PML(Q)				

== Election 2018 ==
General elections were held on 25 July 2018.

General election 2018: NA-187 Layyah-I
Party	Candidate	Votes	%	±%
PTI	Abdul Majeed Khan Niazi	94,477	33.49	
Independent	Sardar Bahadur Ahmed Khan	88,544	31.39	
PML(N)	Faiz Ul Hassan	64,582	22.89	
PPP	Altaf Hussain	20,271	7.19	
Others	Others (six candidates)	14,236	5.05	
Turnout		291,480	63.71	
Total valid votes		282,110	96.79	
Rejected ballots		9,370	3.21	
Majority		5,933	2.10	
Registered electors		457,525		
PTI gain from PML(N)				

== Election 2024 ==
General elections were held on 8 February 2024. Anbar Majeed Khan Niazi won the election with 120,544 votes.

General election 2024: NA-181 Layyah-I
Party	Candidate	Votes	%	±%
PTI	Anbar Majeed Khan Niazi (Note: Filed nomination papers as PTI candidate but ECP allowed her to run as an Independent)	120,544	36.70	▲3.21
PML(N)	Faiz Ul Hassan	95,109	28.95	▲6.06
PPP	Sardar Bahadur Ahmed Khan	70,936	21.60	▲14.41
Others	Others (eleven candidates)	41,892	12.75	
Turnout		340,425	59.28	▼4.43
Total valid votes		328,481	96.49	
Rejected ballots		11,944	3.51	
Majority		25,435	7.74	▲5.64
Registered electors		574,258		

== See also ==
- NA-180 Muzaffargarh-IV
- NA-182 Layyah-II
