= PP-280 Layyah-II =

Constituency of the Punjabi Provincial Legislature, Pakistan

- Constituency for the Provincial Assembly of Punjab
- Region: Karor Lal Esan Tehsil (partly) and Layyah Tehsil (partly) of Layyah District

Current constituency
- Member: vacant
- Created from: PP-263 Layyah-II (2002-2018); PP-281 Layyah-II (2018-2023)

PP-280 Layyah-II (پی پی-280، ليہ-2) is a Constituency of Provincial Assembly of Punjab.

== General elections 2024 ==
Provincial election 2024: PP-280 Layyah-II
| Party | Candidate | Votes | % | ±% |
|---|---|---|---|---|
| Independent | Sardar Shahab-ud-Din Khan (Note: Filed nomination papers as PTI candidate but ECP allowed him to run as an Independent) | 39,087 | 29.65 | |
| PML(N) | Malik Abdul Shakoor Siwag | 26,971 | 20.46 | |
| PPP | Sajjad Ahmad Khan | 22,398 | 16.99 | |
| Independent | Malik Muhammad Akram | 13,997 | 10.62 | |
| Independent | Rai Safdar Abbas Bhatti | 11,021 | 8.36 | |
| Independent | Muahammad Salal Haider | 7,363 | 5.59 | |
| TLP | Muhammad Aurangzaib | 2,592 | 1.97 | |
| Independent | Muhammad Luqman Hafiz | 2,562 | 1.94 | |
| Others | Others (twelve candidates) | 5,836 | 4.42 | |
| Turnout | | 136,907 | 58.98 | |
| Total valid votes | | 131,827 | 96.29 | |
| Rejected ballots | | 5,080 | 3.71 | |
| Majority | | 12,116 | 9.19 | |
| Registered electors | | 232,140 | | |
| hold | | | | |

== General elections 2018 ==
Provincial election 2018: PP-281 Layyah-II
| Party | Candidate | Votes | % | ±% |
|---|---|---|---|---|
| PTI | Shahab Ud Din Khan | 33,203 | 30.91 | |
| PML(N) | Malik Abdul Shakoor | 30,209 | 28.12 | |
| PPP | Malik Riaz Hussain | 17,709 | 16.48 | |
| Independent | Malik Muhammad Akram | 11,839 | 11.02 | |
| MMA | Syed Nayyer Abbas | 6,320 | 5.88 | |
| Independent | Rai Safdar Abbas Bhatti | 4,257 | 3.96 | |
| TLP | Arshad Ali | 2,362 | 2.20 | |
| Others | Others (six candidates) | 1,536 | 1.43 | |
| Turnout | | 111,271 | 62.31 | |
| Total valid votes | | 107,435 | 96.55 | |
| Rejected ballots | | 3,836 | 3.45 | |
| Majority | | 2,994 | 2.79 | |
| Registered electors | | 178,570 | | |

== General elections 2013 ==
Provincial election 2013: PP-263 Layyah-II
| Party | Candidate | Votes | % | ±% |
|---|---|---|---|---|
| PPP | Shahabuddin Khan | 32,572 | 34.78 | |
| PML(N) | Malik Abdul Shakoor | 21,670 | 23.14 | |
| Independent | Rai Safdar Abbas Bhatti | 10,570 | 11.29 | |
| Independent | Qaisar Irshad | 9,257 | 9.89 | |
| PTI | Malik Muhammad Akram | 8,201 | 8.76 | |
| Independent | Syed Ali Shah | 5,807 | 6.20 | |
| Independent | Iqbal Ahmad Khan Shahani | 3,627 | 3.87 | |
| Others | Others (nine candidates) | 1,939 | 2.07 | |
| Turnout | | 98,057 | 67.34 | |
| Total valid votes | | 93,643 | 95.50 | |
| Rejected ballots | | 4,414 | 4.50 | |
| Majority | | 10,902 | 11.64 | |
| Registered electors | | 145,616 | | |

== General elections 2008 ==
| Contesting candidates | Party affiliation | Votes polled |

== See also ==
- PP-279 Layyah-I
- PP-281 Layyah-III
