= PP-279 Layyah-I =

Constituency of the Punjabi Provincial Legislature, Pakistan

- Constituency for the Provincial Assembly of Punjab
- Region: Karor Lal Esan Tehsil (partly) including Karor Lal Esan city and Fateh Pur town in Layyah District

Current constituency
- Member: vacant
- Created from: PP-262 Layyah-I (2002-2018); PP-280 Layyah-I (2018-2023)

PP-279 Layyah-I (پی پی-279، ليہ-1) is a Constituency of Provincial Assembly of Punjab.

== General elections 2024 ==
Provincial election 2024: PP-279 Layyah-I
| Party | Candidate | Votes | % | ±% |
|---|---|---|---|---|
| Independent | Muhammad Athar Maqbool (Note: Filed nomination papers as PTI candidate but ECP allowed him to run as an Independent) | 54,483 | 41.29 | |
| PML(N) | Malik Ahmed Ali Aulakh | 51,760 | 39.22 | |
| Independent | Ghulam Rasool | 8,513 | 6.45 | |
| TLP | Muhammad Akram | 7,733 | 5.86 | |
| JI | Mubashar Naeem Chuhdary | 2,054 | 1.56 | |
| Others | Others (fifteen candidates) | 7,426 | 5.62 | |
| Turnout | | 136,352 | 57.88 | |
| Total valid votes | | 131,969 | 96.79 | |
| Rejected ballots | | 4,383 | 3.21 | |
| Majority | | 2,723 | 2.07 | |
| Registered electors | | 235,589 | | |
| hold | | | | |

== General elections 2018 ==
Provincial election 2018: PP-280 Layyah-I
| Party | Candidate | Votes | % | ±% |
|---|---|---|---|---|
| Independent | Malik Ahmad Ali Aulakh | 37,840 | 31.05 | |
| PTI | Muhammad Athar Maqbool | 32,259 | 26.47 | |
| PPP | Inam Ul Haq | 17,084 | 14.02 | |
| Independent | Ghulam Rasool | 11,950 | 9.81 | |
| Independent | Naiz Muhammad Gujjar | 9,081 | 7.45 | |
| Independent | Malik Abdul Rasheed Samtia | 7,570 | 6.21 | |
| TLP | Muhammad Akram | 2,597 | 2.13 | |
| Independent | Yasir Arfat | 1,364 | 1.12 | |
| MMA | Mubashar Naeem Chaudhary | 1,242 | 1.02 | |
| Others | Others (four candidates) | 880 | 0.72 | |
| Turnout | | 126,048 | 62.50 | |
| Total valid votes | | 121,867 | 96.68 | |
| Rejected ballots | | 4,181 | 3.32 | |
| Majority | | 5,581 | 4.58 | |
| Registered electors | | 201,687 | | |

== General elections 2013 ==
Provincial election 2013: PP-262 Layyah-I
| Party | Candidate | Votes | % | ±% |
|---|---|---|---|---|
| PTI | Abdul Majeed Khan | 35,684 | 35.48 | |
| Independent | Muhammad Athar Maqbool | 27,425 | 27.27 | |
| PML(N) | Ahmed Ali Malik Aulakh | 25,144 | 25.00 | |
| PML(Q) | Chaudhry Altaf Hussain | 10,037 | 9.98 | |
| JI | Mubasher Naeem Chaudhry | 1,659 | 1.65 | |
| Others | Others (seven candidates) | 636 | 0.63 | |
| Turnout | | 104,637 | 67.14 | |
| Total valid votes | | 100,585 | 96.13 | |
| Rejected ballots | | 4,052 | 3.87 | |
| Majority | | 8,259 | 8.21 | |
| Registered electors | | 155,838 | | |

== General elections 2008 ==
| Contesting candidates Peer Mahboob Ul Hassan | Party affiliation | Votes polled |

== See also ==
- PP-278 Kot Addu-III
- PP-280 Layyah-II
