= NA-182 Layyah-II =

Constituency of the National Assembly of Pakistan

- Constituency for the National Assembly of Pakistan
- Region: Layyah Tehsil (partly) including Layyah city of Layyah District
- Electorate: 547,727

Current constituency
- Party: Pakistan Tehreek-e-Insaf
- Member: Malik Awais Jakhar
- Created from: NA-188 Layyah-II

NA-182 Layyah-II (این اے-182، ليّہ-۲) is a constituency for the National Assembly of Pakistan.

== Election 2002 ==
General elections were held on 10 October 2002. Malik Niaz Ahmad Jakhar of PPP won by 74,932 votes.

General election 2002: NA-182 Layyah-II
Party	Candidate	Votes	%	±%
PPP	Niaz Ahmed Jhakkar	74,932	43.05	
PML(Q)	Malik Ghulam Haider Thind	58,087	33.37	
PML(N)	Syed Muhammad Saqlain Shah Bukhari	32,247	18.53	
Others	Others (two candidates)	8,796	5.05	
Turnout		178,405	58.73	
Total valid votes		174,062	97.57	
Rejected ballots		4,343	2.43	
Majority		16,845	9.68	
Registered electors		303,784		

== Election 2008 ==
General elections were held on 18 February 2008. Syed Muhammad Saqlain Shah Bukhari of PML-N won by 75,910 votes.

General election 2008: NA-182 Layyah-II
Party	Candidate	Votes	%	±%
PML(N)	Syed Muhammad Saqlain Shah Bukhari	75,910	44.83	
PML(Q)	Niaz Ahmed Jhakkar	52,108	30.77	
PPP	Syed Faqeer Hussain Shah	41,328	24.40	
Turnout		174,379	58.99	
Total valid votes		169,346	97.11	
Rejected ballots		5,033	2.89	
Majority		23,802	14.06	
Registered electors		295,598		
PML(N) gain from PPP				

== Election 2013 ==
General elections were held on 11 May 2013. Syed Muhammad Saqlain Shah Bukhari of PML-N won by 85,292 votes and became the member of National Assembly.

General election 2013: NA-182 Layyah-II
Party	Candidate	Votes	%	±%
PML(N)	Syed Muhammad Saqlain Shah Bukhari	85,292	33.53	
PPP	Niaz Ahmed Jhakkar	75,127	29.54	
JI	Ch. Asghar Ali Gujjar	43,242	17.00	
PTI	Iftikhar Ali Khitran	32,212	12.66	
Independent	Syed Faqeer Hussain Shah	14,628	5.75	
Others	Others (eight candidates)	3,851	1.52	
Turnout		263,654	67.89	
Total valid votes		254,352	96.47	
Rejected ballots		9,302	3.53	
Majority		10,165	3.99	
Registered electors		388,333		
PML(N) hold				

== Election 2018 ==
General elections were held on 25 July 2018.

General election 2018: NA-188 Layyah-II
Party	Candidate	Votes	%	±%
PTI	Niaz Ahmed Jhakkar	109,854	39.20	
PML(N)	Syed Muhammad Saqlain Shah Bukhari	103,152	36.81	
PPP	Muhammad Ramzan	37,523	13.39	
Independent	Ishfaq Ahmed	14,271	5.09	
TLP	Atiq Ur Rehman Mirani	6,242	2.23	
Independent	Sobia Ramzan	2,709	0.97	
MMA	Maher Muhammad Bilal Kalasra	2,108	0.75	
Independent	Sajjad Ahmed	1,993	0.71	
Independent	Ghulam Abbas	928	0.33	
APML	Muhammad Farrukh Cheema	883	0.32	
Independent	Kalsoom Khaliq	557	0.20	
Turnout		288,384	64.21	
Total valid votes		280,220	97.17	
Rejected ballots		8,164	2.83	
Majority		6,702	2.39	
Registered electors		449,098		
PTI gain from PML(N)				

== Election 2024 ==
General elections were held on 8 February 2024. Malik Awais Jakhar won the election with 141,973 votes.

General election 2024: NA-182 Layyah-II
Party	Candidate	Votes	%	±%
PTI	Malik Awais Jakhar (Note: Filed nomination papers as PTI candidate but ECP allowed him to run as an Independent)	141,973	44.26	▲5.06
PML(N)	Syed Muhammad Saqlain Shah Bukhari	118,686	37.00	▲0.19
PPP	Muhammad Ramzan	21,365	6.66	▼6.73
Independent	Iftikhar Ali Khitran	12,238	3.81	
TLP	Muhammad Yousaf	10,589	3.30	▲1.07
Others	Others (seven candidates)	15,937	4.97	
Turnout		329,965	60.24	▼3.97
Total valid votes		320,788	97.22	
Rejected ballots		9,177	2.78	
Majority		23,287	7.26	▲4.87
Registered electors		547,727		

== See also ==
- NA-181 Layyah-I
- NA-183 Taunsa
