= Jaman Shah =

Town in Layyah District, Punjab, Pakistan

Coordinates: 30°53′N 70°55′E

Jaman Shah is a small town in Layyah District in Punjab, Pakistan. It lies at 30°52'16.5"N 70°56'20.1"E, 12 kilometres (7.5 mi) south of Layyah city. The area consists of a semi-rectangular block of sandy land between the Indus and Chenab rivers in Indus Sagar Doab. It is within the recently established civil division of Dera Ghazi Khan. Here the founder of Jaico Publishing House, Jaman Ali Khan (Gilani) was born to a simple Sayed Muslim family of Arab ancestry which originated from Ha'il.

== History ==
Jaman Shah is named after the Saint Jumman Shah, whose followers named the place after him and whose tomb in located in the town.

== Description ==
The Indus River flows to its Western side. Basti Piply, Basti Jhakar, Basti Jaisal, Basti Chandrain, Basti Jawali, Dari, Basti lali, Moza Khokhar Wala, Basti Bhakri, Basti Kunal, Chah Kikar Wala/ Wandar Wala and Chah Langar Wala/Achlana Wala are some known places there. Thaheem, Sayyed (gillani), Sayyed (Kazmi), Bhatti, Klasra, Jhakar, Achlana, Melowana, Jutt Wandar, Jutt Taheem, Qasai, Roongha, Chanchra are some of the castes belonging to Jaman Shah.

== Education ==
The education system in Jaman Shah is formulated along specific modern, religious, cultural, social, psychological and scientific injunctions. The system is divided into four levels: primary (grades one through five); middle (grades six through eight); high (grades nine and ten, leading to the Secondary School Certificate); intermediate (grades eleven and twelve, leading to a Higher Secondary School Certificate). Student need to travel to Layyah for higher education. The main leading educational institutes are:

- Government Higher Secondary School Jaman Shah for boys.
- Government High School Basti Chandrain for boys
- Government High Jaman Shah School for girls.
- Government High School Basti Sirae for boys.
- Government High School Sheran wala for boys.
- Government Middle School Adda Larian Usman Shah for boys.

There are also other government middle and primary schools. Many private school systems also operate there, including:

- Eman School System
- Toheed Academy
- Mustafai Public School
- Al-Raza Public school
- Sanwal Institute Public school
- Three Star Public school
- Subhan Public school
- The Guardian Public school
- Decent Bahadur Public school
- The Scholar Public School
- Three Star Public High School
- Toheed Public High School
