= Abdul Majeed Khan Niazi =

Pakistani politician

Member of the National Assembly of Pakistan
- In office 13 August 2018 – 20 January 2023
- Constituency: NA-187 (Layyah-I)

Member of the Provincial Assembly of the Punjab
- In office 29 May 2013 – 31 May 2018
- Constituency: PP-262 (Layyah-I)

Personal details
- Born: 23 September 1970 (age 55) Layyah, Punjab, Pakistan
- Party: PTI (2013-present)
- Spouse: Anbar Majeed Khan Niazi (wife)

Abdul Majeed Khan Niazi (Urdu: عبد المجید خان نیازی) is a Pakistani politician who had been a member of the National Assembly of Pakistan from August 2018 till January 2023. Previously he was a Member of the Provincial Assembly of the Punjab, from May 2013 to May 2018.

== Early life ==
He was born on 23 September 1970 to Niazi Pashtun Tribe in Layyah District.

== Political career ==
He was elected to the Provincial Assembly of the Punjab as a candidate of Pakistan Tehreek-e-Insaf (PTI) from PP-262 Layyah-I in the 2013 Punjab provincial election. He received 35,684 votes and defeated an independent candidate, Muhammad Athar Maqbool.

He was elected to the National Assembly of Pakistan as a candidate of PTI from NA-187 Layyah-I in the 2018 Pakistani general election. He received 94,477 votes and defeated Sardar Bahadur Ahmed Khan, an independent candidate.

== More Reading ==
- List of members of the 15th National Assembly of Pakistan
