= Mustansar Hussain Tarar =

Pakistani Author and TV Host (born 1939)

Mustansar Hussain Tarar SI NI
- Born: 1 March 1939 (age 87); Jokalian,Mandi Bahauddin Punjab Province
- Occupations: Novelist, actor, newspaper columnist, travelogue writer, TV Host
- Writing career
- Pen name: مستنصر حسین تارڑ
- Language: Urdu, English, and Punjabi.
- Notable works: Payar Ka Pehla Shehr (پیار کا پہلا شہر), Bahhao (بہاؤ), Niklay Teri Talash Main (نکلے تیری تلاش میں), among others.
- Notable awards: Nishan-e-Imtiaz, Sitara-e-Imtiaz, and Pride of Performance
- Website: mustansarhussaintarar.com

Mustansar Hussain Tarar (Urdu: مستنصر حسين تارڑ; Mustanṣar Ḥusẹ̄n Tāraṙ) S.I. (born 1 March 1939) is a Pakistani author, travel enthusiast, mountaineer, writer, novelist, columnist, TV host and former actor.

== Early life ==
Mustansar Hussain Tarar was born in Jokalian,Mandi Bahauddin on 1 March 1939 into a Tarar Jat family. His father, Rehmat Khan Tarar, operated an agricultural seed store by the name of "Kisan & Company" that flourished and became a major business in that field.

Tarar was educated at Rang Mahal Mission High School and Muslim Model High School, both in Lahore, Pakistan. He pursued higher studies at Government College, Lahore and in London. While abroad, he spent much of his time watching movies, hanging out with friends and reading books. In 1958, he attended the World Youth Festival in Moscow and wrote a book named Fakhta (Urdu. "Dove") based on his experience.

== Career ==
He has written more than 75 books, including novels and travelogues, not mentioning his collection of short stories. His first book was a travelogue of Europe published in 1971 by the title of Niklay Teri Talaash Main (1970), dedicated to his youngest brother, Mobashir Hussain Tarar. This followed a period during which he travelled in seventeen European countries, and spearheaded a new trend of travelogues in Urdu literature. So far he has over forty travelogues ('Safar Nama' in Urdu) to his credit.

He also became a television actor and was, for many years, a host of Pakistan Television Corporation's (PTV) live morning show Subah Bakhair (1988) (Good Morning). He called himself chacha jee (paternal uncle) of all Pakistani children and soon became known by this title.

Shadi Online was a matrimonial show conceived by a private TV channel (Geo TV). It ran for more than 350 episodes and later was turned into an online matrimonial website. Tarar was selected as the host due to the trust of people, especially parents, had in him.

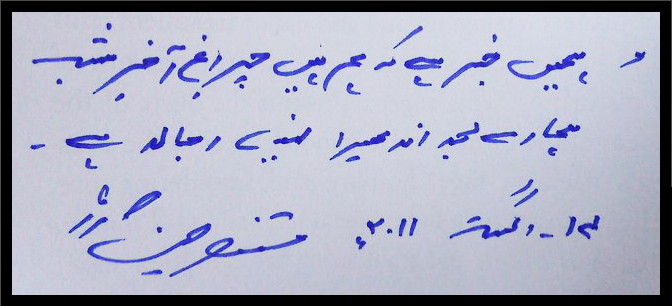
An autograph by Mustansar Hussain

Tarar has been an active mountaineer for many years and has been to the base camp of the K2, the world's second highest mountain, and the Chitti Buoi Glacier.

== Columns as a journalist and books ==
During his long career, he has been a newspaper columnist and a contributor to Pakistani newspapers including Dawn and Daily Aaj, and used to write a weekly column for Akhbar-e-Jahan.

His books include:

- London Se Moscow Tak (لندن سے ماسکو تک)(First travelogue) (1958)
- Mantiqul Tair, Jadeed (منطق الطیر، جدید) (Conference of Birds, Modern) (ISBN 9693531574, Publisher: SMP, Language: Urdu, Category: Novel Year: 2018)
- Andulus Mayn Ajnabi (اندلس میں اجنبی) (Stranger in Spain) (ISBN No:9693515471, Publisher:SMP, Language:URDU, Category: SAFAR NAMA Year: 2009) First published in 1972
- Bahhao (بہاؤ) (Flow)
- Bay Izti Kharab (بے عزتی خراب) (Insulting dishonor) – This phrase is deliberately wrong and commonly used this way in local communities, thus the book name
- Berfeeli Bulandiyan (برفیلی بلندیاں) (Snowy Heights)
- Carvan Sarai (کارواں سرائے) (Caravan Motel)
- Chikh Chuk (چِک چُک) (Remove the curtain)
- Chitral Daastan (چترال داستان) (Tale of Chitral)
- Dais Huwaa Perdais (دیس ہوا پردیس) (Homeland becomes foreign land)
- Deosai (دیوسائی)- First published in 2003
- Dakia aur Jolaha (ڈاکیا اور جولاھا) (Postman and cloth-maker)
- Gadhay Hamaray Bhai Hain (گدھے ہمارے بھائی ہیں) (Donkeys are our brothers)
- Ghar-e-Hira Mein Ek Raat (غارِ حراء میں ایک رات) (A night in the cave 'Hira' near Mecca)
- Guzara Naheen Hota (گزارا نہیں ہوتا) (Hard to get by)
- Gypsy (جِپسی)
- Hazaron Hain Shikway (ہزاروں ھیں شکوے) (Have thousands of complaints)
- Hazaron Raastay (ہزاروں راستے) (Thousands of paths)
- Hunza Dastaan (ہنزہ داستان) (Tale of Hunza)
- K-2 Ki Kahani (کے ٹو کی کہانی) (K2 Story)- First published in 1993
- Kaalaash (کالاش) (Kafiristan)
- Khana Badosh (خانہ بدوش) (Gypsi)- First published in 1983
- Moorat (مورت) (Idol)
- Moscow Ki Sufaid Raatein.(ماسکو کی سفید راتیں) ( White Nights of Moscow)
- Munh Wal Kabbey Shariff Dey (منہ ول کعبے شریف دے) (Face towards Qibla) [Experience of performing HAJJ]- First published in 2006
- Nanga Parbat (نانگاپربت) (book named after the mountain of the same name)
- Nepal Nagri (نیپال نگری) (Land of Nepal)- First published in 1999
- Niklay Teri Talash Main (نکلے تیری تلاش میں) (Out searching for you)- First published in 1970
- Pakhairoo (پکھیرو) (Birds)- A book in the Punjabi language
- Parinday (پرندے) (Birds)
- Parwaz (پرواز) (Flight)
- Payar Ka Pehla Shehr (پیار کا پہلا شہر) (Love's first city)- First published in 1974
- Putli Peking Ki (پُتلی پیکنگ کی) (The Peking Doll)- First published in 2009
- Qilaa Jangi (قلعہ جنگی) (Fortified war)
- Qurbat-e-Marg Main Mohabbat (قربتِ مرگ میں محبت) (Love near death)
- Raakh (راکھ) (Ashes)
- Ratti Gali- First published in 2005
- Safar Shumal Kay (سفر شمال کے) (Journeys of the north)- First published in 1991
- Shamshaal Baimesaal (شمشال بیمثال) (Peerless Shamshaal) First published in 2000
- Shehpar (شہپر) (Wings)
- Shuter Murgh Riasat (شتر مرغ ریاست) (Ostrich State)
- Snow Lake (سنو لیک) First published in 2000
- Sunehri Ullo Ka Shaher (سُنہری اُلو کا شہر) (The city of golden owl)
- Yaak Saraey (یاک سرائے) (Yaak Inn)- First published in 1997
- Khas-o-Khashak Zamane (خس و خاشاک زمانے) (Novel)
- Alaska Highway (آلاسکا ہائے وے) (Travelogue)
- Australia Awargi (آسٹریلیا آوارگی) (Travelogue, 2015)
- 15-Kahaniyan (15 کہانیاں) (Short Stories, 2015)
- Rakaposhi Nagar (راکاپوشی نگر) (Travelogue, 2015)
- America Key Sou Rang (امریکا کے سو رنگ) (Travelogue of America, 2015)
- Aur Sindh Behta Raha (اور سندھ بہتا رہا) (Travelogue of Sindh, 2016)
- Haramosh Naqabil e Faramosh (Travelogue of Haramosh peak, 2017)
- Karvaan Siraye (کاروان سرائے) (2001 )
- Ullu Hamare Bhai Hain (الو ہمارے بھائی ہیں)
- Lahore Awargi (لاہور آوارگی)
- Pyar ka Pehla Punjab (پیار کا پہلا پنجاب)
- Siyah Aankh Mein Tasveer (سیاہ آنکھ میں تصویر)
- Tarar Nama (تارڑ نامہ)

== Drama ==
He is also the author of many famous drama series for PTV.

- Hazaron Raaste (Thousands of Paths)
- Parinda (Bird)
- Shahpar (Wings)
- Sooraj Ke Sath Sath (staying along with the Sun)
- Keilash (Name of a tribe in northern areas of Pakistan)
- Fareb (Deception)
- Sahab Sarkar (The Master)

== Travelogue writer ==
As a mountaineer and a travelogue writer himself, Tarar has long promoted the cause of tourism projects in the Northern Areas of Pakistan.

== Awards and recognition ==
- Nishan-e-Imtiaz (Order of Excellence) - Announced on 14 August 2025, in Literature by the President of Pakistan, to be presented on 23 March 2026.
- Sitara-i-Imtiaz (Star of Excellence) - Awarded in Literature by the President of Pakistan in 2017
- Pride of Performance Award - Awarded in Literature in 1992
- Anjuman Farogh-i-Urdu (Qatar) Award
- Pakistan Academy of Letters PAL nominated him in 2022 for Kamal-e-Fun Award (Lifetime Achievement Award) shared with Ashu Lal Faqeer, but he refused to take the 'half award'.
- Prime Minister's Literary Award in 1999 for his novel Rakh.
- Gold Medal from Moscow State University
- Tarar also remained 'Pakistan's most popular personality' for 2 years consecutively in the 1990s.

== See also ==
- Ashu Lal Faqeer
