= Chowk Azam =

City in Punjab, Pakistan

Chowk Azam چوک اعظم
- City
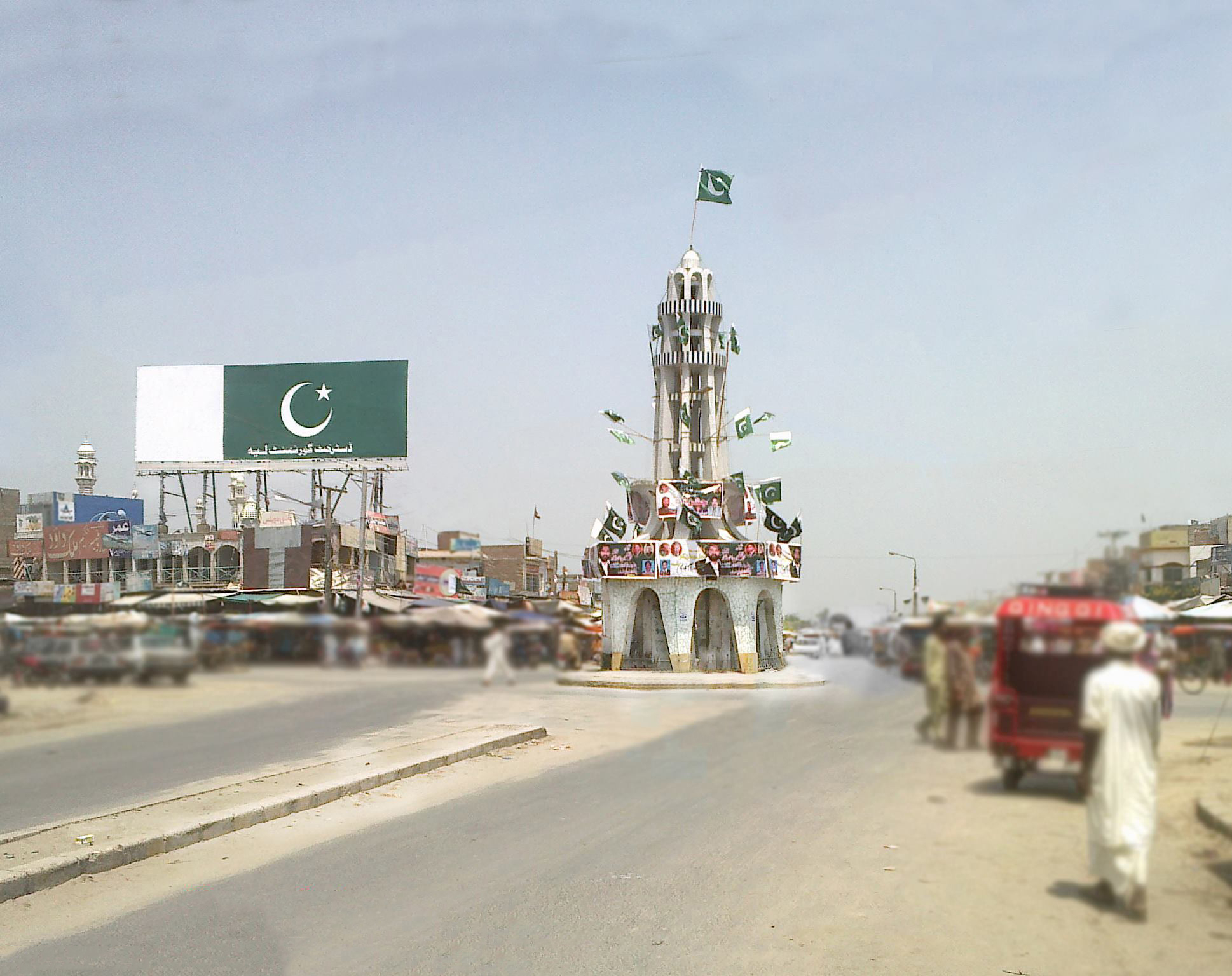
- Chowk Azam Minar

- Location within Punjab, Pakistan Location within Pakistan
- Coordinates: 30.9647672°N 71.2169821°E
- Country: Pakistan
- Province: Punjab
- District: Layyah
- Tehsil: Layyah

Government
  - Type: Municipal Committee
  - Chief Officer: Mr. Iftikhar Bangash

Population (2023)
  - City: 87,376
  - Rank: 149th in Pakistan
- Time zone: UTC+5 (PST)
- Postal code: 31450
- Calling code: 0606

Chowk Azam is a city in Layyah District of Punjab province of Pakistan. It is located 25 kilometres (16 mi) from Layyah city, the headquarters of the Layyah District, on the Mianwali-Multan road and Layyah-Shorkot road. According to the 2023 Census of Pakistan, Chowk Azam has a population of 87,376.

The city has many educational and vocational institutions, including Government Muslim High School, Divisional Public School, Government College for Boys and Government College for Girls. The campus of the Government College University Faisalabad and Bahauddin Zakariya University in Layyah and Government Graduate College in Chowk Azam provide point services for students commuting from Chowk Azam and the vicinity.

Chowk Azam is located at a latitude of 30.9706551 and a longitude of 71.212303.

== Demographics ==
Population

Historical population
Year	Pop.	±%
1998	33,541	—
2017	67,421	+101.0%
2023	87,376	+29.6%

According to the 2023 Census of Pakistan, the population of Chowk Azam stood at 87,376, up from 67,421 recorded during the 2017 Census. The city experienced an annual population growth rate of 4.5% between 2017 and 2023. In terms of gender breakdown in 2023, the population comprised 44,572 males (51%), 42,796 females (49%).
