= Chak 98 ML =

Coordinates: 31°12′N 71°05′E

Chak 98/ML is a village located in Karor Lal Easan Tehsil, Layyah District, in Pakistan's Punjab province. The village is situated on Karor-Fateh Pur road, 12.5 km to the east of Karor Lal Easan city. Administratively, the village is also a union council, namely Union Council Chak 98/ML. The village has the tomb of Baba Gafoor Shah. Cultivated land is being irrigated by Maharan Canal which is to the west of the village. Wheat, cotton, millet, mungbean are the main crops cultivated here. Some farmers have also planted citrus orchards.

- Famous festivals of the village include the annual Mela Baba Ghafoor Shah at the tomb of Baba Ghafoor Shah. Chak 98/ML is a centre for different processions of Eid Milad Un Nabi that gather at Jamia Masjid 98/ML.
- Chak 98 has a big mosque named Jamiya Masjid Madina
- The village is between Fatehpur city & Karor city 13 km from Fatehpur and Karor.
