= Chak 100 ML =

Coordinates: 31°10′11″N 71°06′40″E

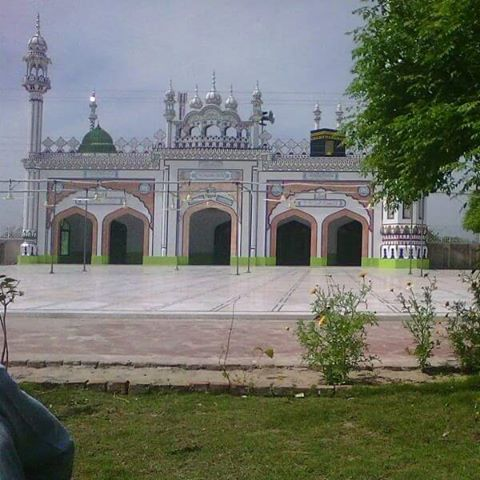
Jamia Masjid Chak 100/ML

Chak 100/ML is a village and union council in Karor Lal Esan Tehsil, Layyah District, Punjab, Pakistan.

It is located 15 km west of Fatehpur, a sub-tehsil of district Layyah. The village is bounded on the north by Chak 99/ML, on the east by Chak 114/ML, on the south by Chak 255/TDA and on the west by Chak 101/ML. Tarkhani Distributary Canal flows on the eastern edge of the village, while Winhar Canal (tail) takes a round about the rest of the village.

== Climate and general soil conditions ==
Summers are extremely hot though winter temperatures are low due to the village's proximity to Kōh-e Sulaymān range. The average temperature is 40 °C in the summer and 10 °C in the winter. The land is comparatively better developed agriculturally than other areas of the district.

Month	Jan	Feb	Mar	Apr	May	Jun	Jul	Aug	Sep	Oct	Nov	Dec	Year
Avg high °C	20	23	28	35	41	43	40	38	38	35	28	23	32
Avg low temperature °C	4	8	12	18	24	29	28	28	24	17	9	4	17
Rainfall in. (Cm)	1.2	1.8	3.4	2.4	1.5	1.5	6.1	4.4	1.6	0.5	0.2	0.8	25.4
Source: weatherbase

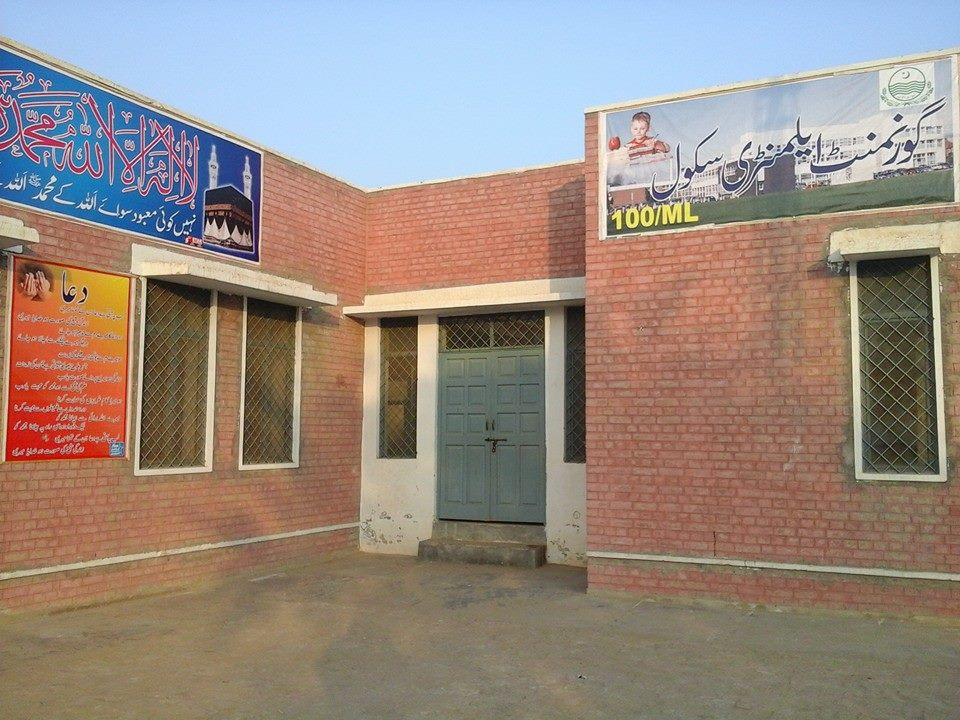
Govt Elementary School Chak 100/ML, Tehsil Karor Lal Eson, Layyah

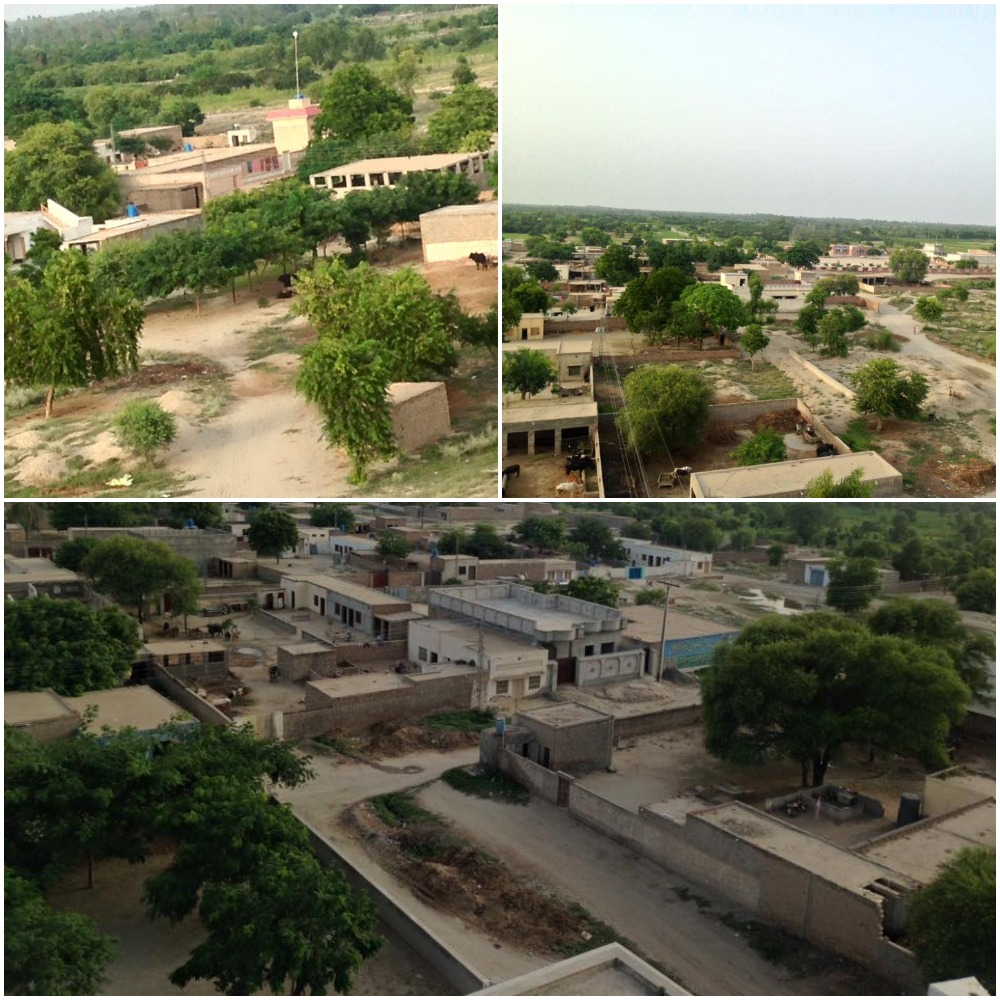
Village life of Chak 100/ML

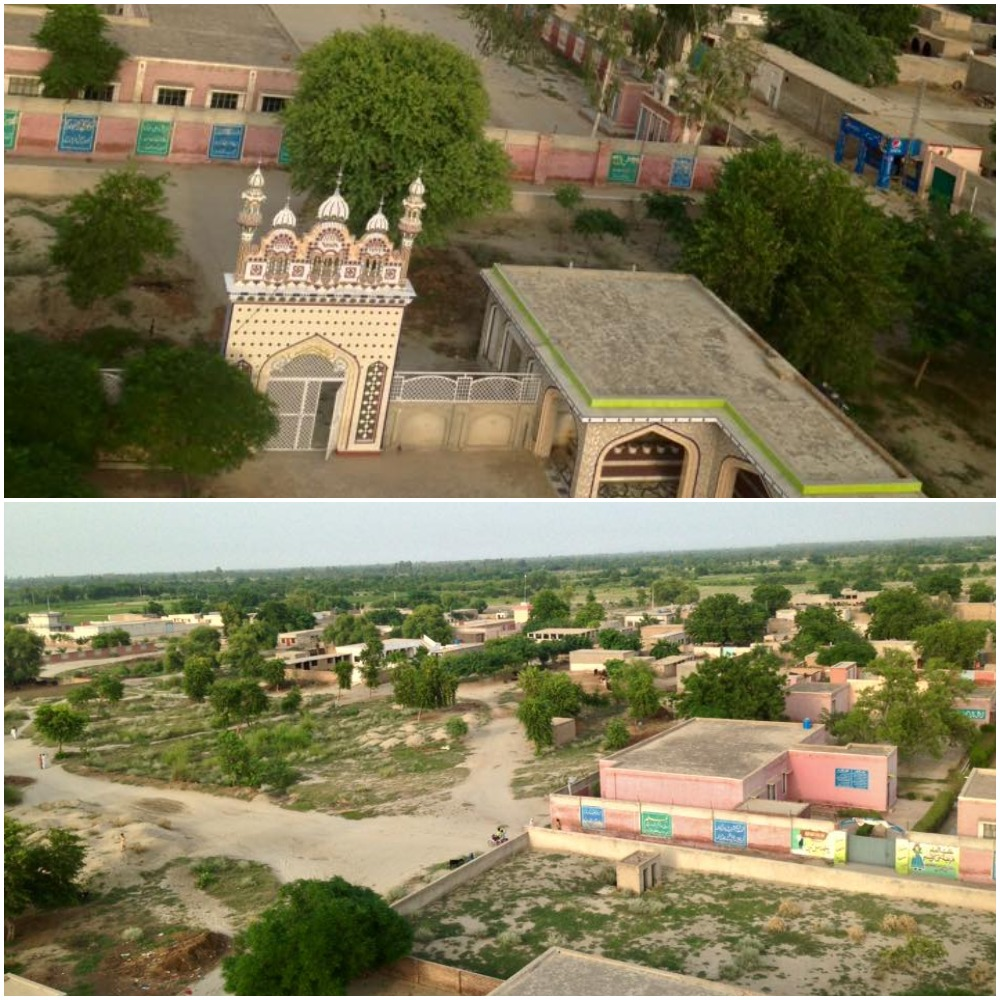
Village Chak 100/ML
