= Sardar Shahab-ud-Din Khan =

Pakistani politician

Member of the Provincial Assembly of the Punjab
- In office 15 August 2018 – 14 January 2023
- Constituency: PP-281 Layyah-II
- In office 1 June 2013 – 31 May 2018
- Constituency: PP-263 (Layyah-II)

Personal details
- Born: 1 May 1968 (age 58) Layyah, Punjab, Pakistan
- Party: PTI (2018-present)
- Other political affiliations: PPP (2013-2018)

Sardar Shahab-ud-Din Khan Seehar is a Pakistani politician and agriculturist from Layyah. He served as a member of the Provincial Assembly of the Punjab from August 2018 to January 2023. He also served as the Provincial Minister of Punjab for Livestock.

== Early life and education ==
He was born on 1 May 1968 in Layyah District.

He has completed graduation.

== Political career ==
He was elected to the Provincial Assembly of the Punjab as a candidate of the Pakistan People's Party (PPP) from PP-263 (Layyah-II) in the 2013 Punjab provincial election.

In April 2018, he left the PPP and joined Pakistan Tehreek-e-Insaf (PTI).

He was re-elected to Provincial Assembly of the Punjab as a candidate of the PTI from PP-281 (Layyah-II) in the 2018 Punjab provincial election.

He ran for a seat in the Provincial Assembly from PP-281 Layyah-II as a candidate of the PTI in the 2024 Punjab provincial election.
