= Laskani Wala =

Town in Punjab, Pakistan

Laskani Wala is a town in Layyah District of Punjab, Pakistan.
