= Muslim High School =

Muslim High School may refer to:

- Government Muslim High School, a high school in Chittagong
- Dhaka Government Muslim High School, a high school in Dhaka
- Muslim Model High School, Lahore, a high school in Lahore
- Preston Muslim Girls High School, a high school in England
