= Bakhri Ahmad Khan =

Location of Layyah District within Punjab, Pakistan

Bakhri Ahmad Khan is a village situated on the bank of the river Indus in Layyah District, Punjab, Pakistan.

It is located at 30.7359°N 70.838°E at an altitude of 141 meters. Many people work in public services. Gurmani Balouch is the main caste of this village.

Bakhri Ahmad Khan is part of union council No. 7, out of the 42 union councils of Layyah tehsil. The name of its mouza is Bait Dabli. The total registered voters are 1,336. The total population is about 2,000 according to GeoNames geographical database.

A major problem of this village is flooding and a lack of proper healthcare facilities.
