= Fazal Hussain Soomra =

Pakistani Politician

Mahr Fazal Hussain Soomra

Member of the Provincial Assembly of the Punjab
- In office 2003–2007
- Constituency: PP-266 (Layyah-V)

Member of the Provincial Assembly of the Punjab
- In office 1993–1996
- Constituency: PP-216 (Layyah)

Special Assistant to the Chief Minister of Punjab
- In office 1994–1996

Parliamentary Secretary for Labour
- In office 1993–1994

Personal details
- Born: Mehr Fazal Hussain Soomra; December 23, 1946 (age 79) Layyah, Punjab, Pakistan
- Party: Pakistan Muslim League (Q)
- Other political affiliations: Pakistan Peoples Party
- Spouse: Married
- Children: 6
- Parent: Mahr Qadir Bakhsh Soomra (father)
- Relatives: Manzoor Hussain Soomra (brother)
- Education: University Law College, Lahore (LL.B.)
- Occupation: Politician
- Profession: Lawyer

Mahr Fazal Hussain Soomra is a Pakistani politician. He was a Member of the Provincial Assembly of Punjab from PP-266 (Layyah-V) in 2002 to 2007 and from PP-216 Layyah in 1993 to 1996.

== Early life ==
He was born on December 23, 1946 at Layyah to Mehr Qadir Bakhsh Soomra. He earned an LL.B. in 1969 from University Law College Lahore.

== Political career ==
He was elected from PP 216 Layyah with 39,682 votes as a candidate of PPP. and Served as Parliamentary Secretary for Labour during 1993-94 and as Special Assistant to Chief Minister during 1994-96. He served as the Naib Zila Nazim from 2001 to 2002. He was re-elected in bye-elections in 2003. He is the brother of Mahr Manzoor Soomra who was a member of National assembly of Punjab.
