= Basti Mundhe =

- Location within Pakistan
- Coordinates: 30.57°N 70.52°E
- Country: Pakistan
- Province: Punjab
- District: Layyah
- Elevation: 134 m (440 ft)
- Time zone: UTC+5 (PST)

Basti Mundhe is a village in Layyah District in the Punjab province, Pakistan.
