= Malik Awais Jakhar =

Pakistani politician (born 1980)

- ملک اویس جکھڑ

Member of the National Assembly of Pakistan
- Incumbent
- Assumed office 29 February 2024
- Constituency: NA-182 Layyah-II

Personal details
- Born: 16 September 1994 (age 31) Layyah Punjab, Pakistan
- Party: PTI (2024-present)
- Parent: Niaz Ahmed Jhakkar (father)

Malik Awais Jakhar (Urdu: ملک اویس جکھڑ), also known as Malik Awais Haider Jakhar or Malik Awais Niaz Jakhar, is a Pakistani politician who has been a member of the National Assembly of Pakistan since February 2024.

== Political career ==
Jakhar was elected to the National Assembly of Pakistan in the 2024 Pakistani general election from NA-182 Layyah-II as an Independent candidate supported by Pakistan Tehreek-e-Insaf (PTI). He received 141,973 votes while runner-up Syed Muhammad Saqlain Shah Bukhari, a candidate of Pakistan Muslim League (N) (PML (N)), received 118,686 votes.
