= Anbar Majeed Khan Niazi =

Member of the National Assembly of Pakistan from Layyah (2024–2029)

- عنبر مجید خان نیازی

Member of the National Assembly of Pakistan
- Incumbent
- Assumed office 29 February 2024
- Constituency: NA-181 Layyah-I

Personal details
- Party: PTI (2024-present)
- Spouse: Abdul Majeed Khan Niazi (husband)

Anbar Majeed Khan Niazi (Urdu: عنبر مجید خان نیازی), is a Pakistani politician who has been a member of the National Assembly of Pakistan since February 2024.

== Political career ==
Niazi was elected to the National Assembly of Pakistan in the 2024 Pakistani general election from NA-181 Layyah-I as an Independent candidate supported by Pakistan Tehreek-e-Insaf (PTI). She received 120,544 votes while runner-up Sahibzada Faizul Hassan, a candidate of Pakistan Muslim League (N) (PML(N)), received 95,109 votes.
