= Chaubara Dera No. 1 =

Coordinates: 21°49′18″N 75°27′16″E

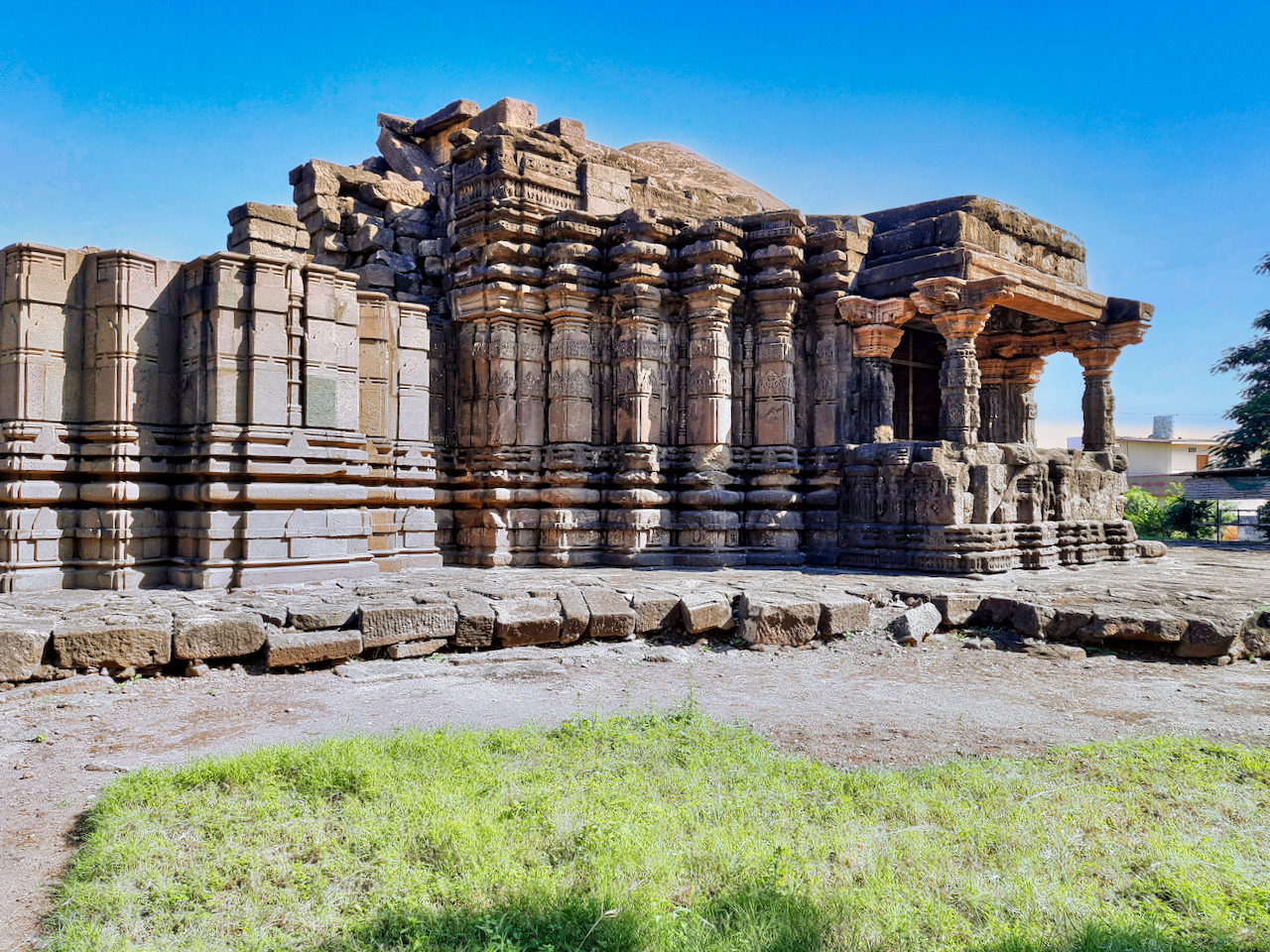

Religion
- Affiliation: Hinduism

Location
- Location: Un, Madhya Pradesh
- Interactive map of Chaubara Dera No. 1

Chaubara Dera No. 1, otherwise simply known as the Chaubara Dera Temple, is a temple in the village of Un, in the Indian state of Madhya Pradesh. It is the largest of a cluster of ruined temples in the village.

The original name of the temple has been lost. The shikhara is completely destroyed, and the main deity within the sanctum has also been lost. Due to a large amount of Shaivite imagery present within the temple, it is assumed that this was probably a Shiva temple.

== History ==
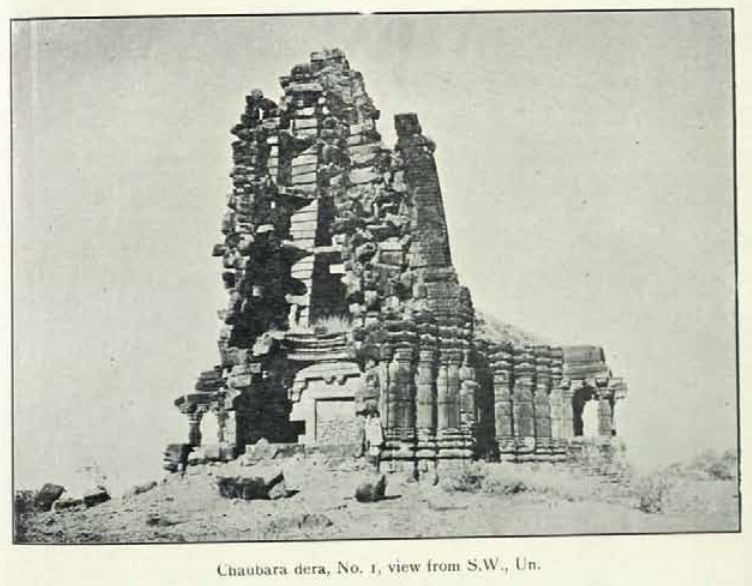
Chaubara Dera No. 1, c. 1920

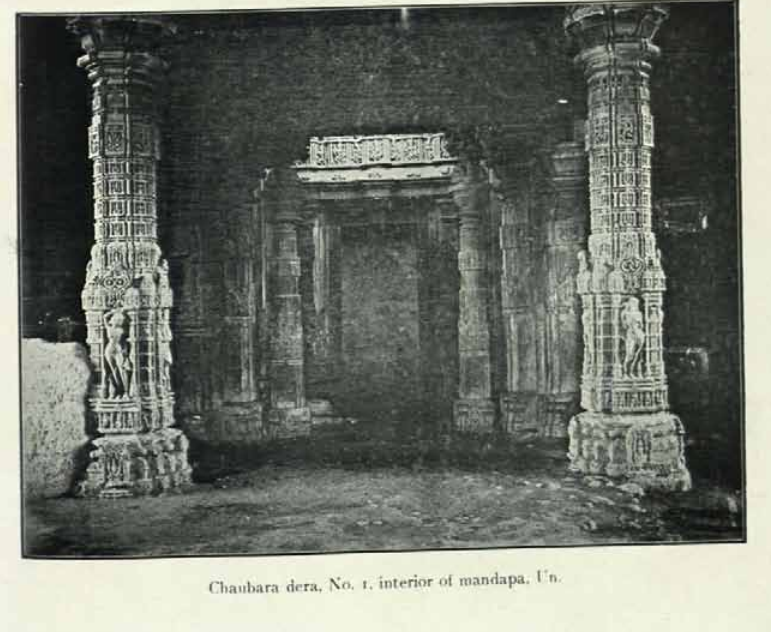
Interior

The date of the temple's construction is not known. Due to the inscription within the temple which mentions Udayaditya (r. 1070–1093 CE), some ascribe its construction to him. However, Adhikari ascribes its construction to Bhoja (r. 1010–1055 CE).

However, from the inscription, it becomes clear that the temple was a center of learning and religious importance during the Paramara period. Subsequently, it was abandoned, albeit remaining well preserved. The main sanctum of this temple was pulled down by a contractor sometime in the early 20th century, for the rubble to be utilized in other constructions.

The group was temples in Un was brought to scholarly attention in the 20th century, with a 1919 report by the Archaeological Survey of India publishing a description as well as photographs of the temples. The locals had named the temple Chaubara Dera (lit. four-sided camp), and it is generally referred to as "Chaubara Dera No. 1" in sources to avoid confusion with another temple nearby with the same name.

== Description ==
Chaubara Dera No. 1 is the largest of a cluster of ruined temples in the village. It is built out of local sandstone in dry masonry. The temple building faces east, with entrance through the main porch on the eastern side. Two smaller porches are provided to the sides. The temple consists of a square mandapa (pillared hall), a rectangular antarala (ante-chamber), and a square garbhagriha (sanctum).

On the same platform is another, smaller temple.

=== Porch ===
The porch is supported by two pillars. These have a square base and lower shaft, with the upper shafts being octagonal. They display geometric and floral patterns.

=== Pillared Hall ===
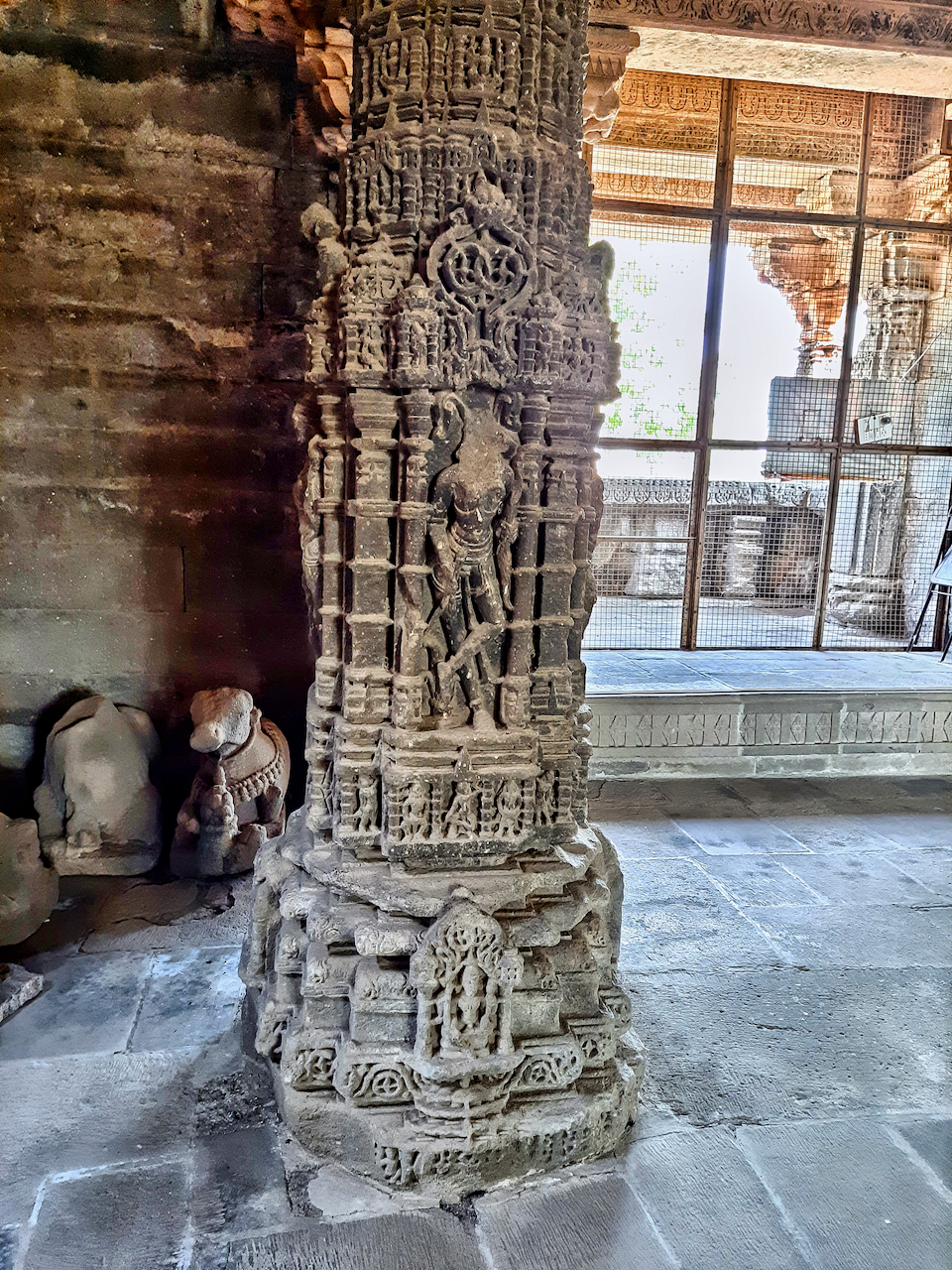
Pillars of the mandapa

The main porch as well as the smaller porches lead into a square mandapa (pillared hall). On the lintel of the door leading from the main porch to the pillared hall, Shiva, along with seven mothers, is represented.

Four pillars of the mandapa support four lintels, which in turn support the domed roof of the hall. The domed roof is elaborately decorated, in a manner similar to the Dilwara Temples. Other adornments to the roof of the hall, apart from the dome, are in the form of small pendentives.

The base and lower portion of the shaft are square, with the upper portions of the shaft being circular. These four pillars are elaborately carved. All four faces of the base of each pillar contain carved images of seated gods and goddesses. Above the base, in the four faces of the lower shaft, are images of apsaras. Further above are six rows, of which five contain the figures of gods and goddesses, while the top row displays dancers and musicians.

=== Ante-chamber ===
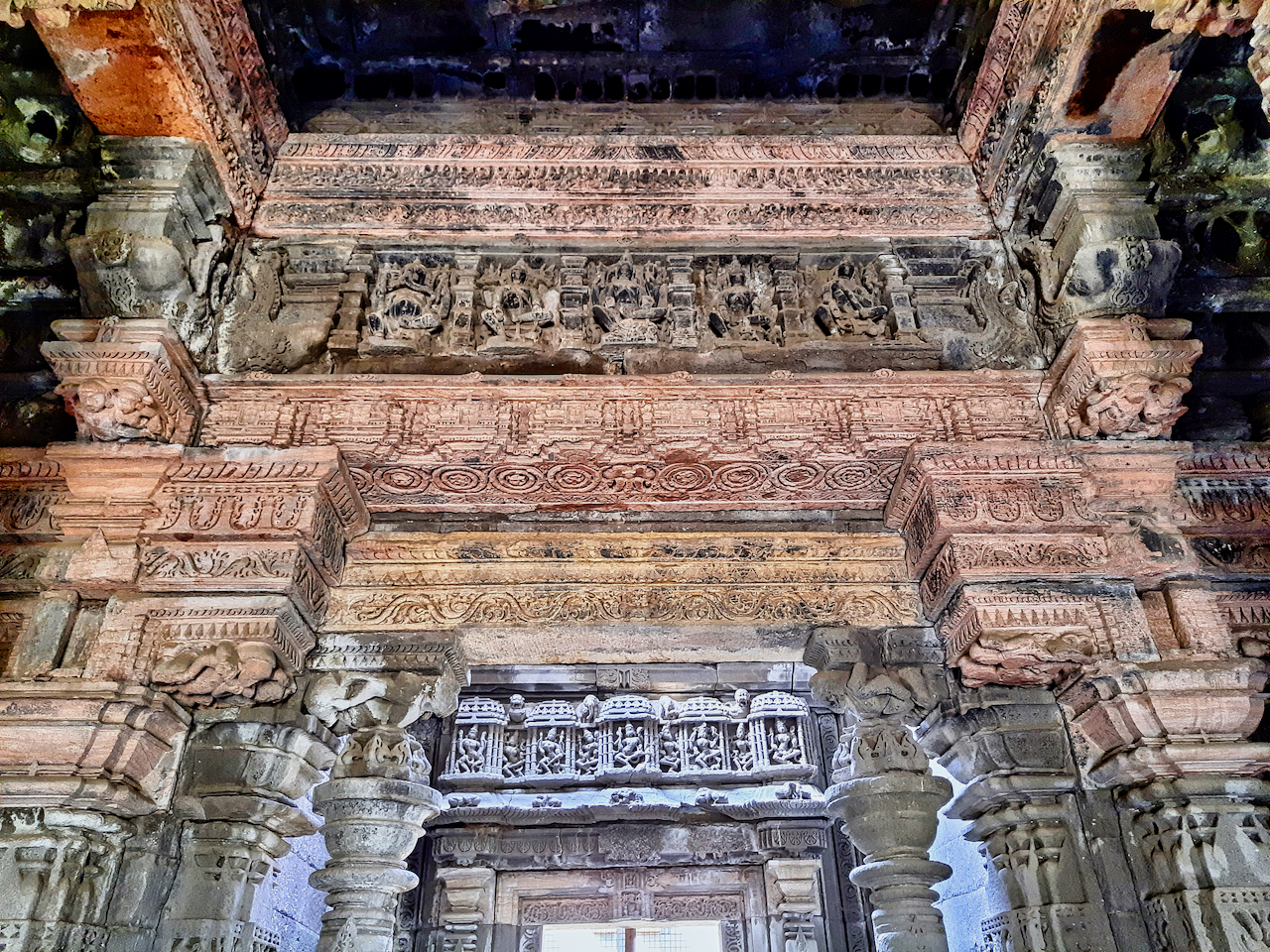
The elaborately carved entrance to the ante-chamber

In the lintel of the entrance of the ante-chamber there are images of Ganesha, Brahma, Shiva, Vishnu, and Saraswati in niches.

==== Inscriptions ====
In the walls of the ante-chamber are three inscriptions. The first of these is an alphabetical chart. The second mentions the Paramara king Udayaditya. The third contains Sanskrit grammatical rules.

=== Sanctum ===
The sanctum has been destroyed. Among the surviving part of the sanctum are some scenes from the Kama Sutra. The main deity present within has been lost.

=== Smaller temple ===
In the northwest corner of the temple, a smaller temple is situated.

== See also ==
- Gvaleshwar temple
- Chaubara Dera No. 2

== Bibliography ==
- Adhikari, Swati Mandal (2001). "The Chaubara Dera Temple at Un in Madhya Pradesh". Proceedings of the Indian History Congress. 62: 986–997. ISSN 2249-1937. JSTOR 44155838.
