= Chak 90 ML =

Coordinates: 31°19′N 71°05′E

Chak 90/ML is a village located in Karor Lal Esan Tehsil, Layyah District, in the province of Punjab, Pakistan. It sits on fertile land on the bank of the Thal Canal built by the British Indian Government during the 1940s. This sandy land of Thal desert was barren before migrants from Hoshiarpur District, now in Indian Punjab, who had been rendered refugees during the partition of India, settled here and used the water from Thal Canal to irrigate their fields. Initially, the land was very fertile in patches where sugarcane, cotton, and wheat were grown successfully and contributed to the country's economy. Some areas consist of sand dunes where in Rabi season Gram crop is grown successfully. One of the major portions of Gram yield is produced from the Thal desert. With the passage of time, schools, roads, and lined watercourses have been developed by the government. A high school for boys was constructed in 1976, while a high school and college for girls were built later on. The village has a Basic Health Unit, Post Office, Veterinary Hospital, and Office of Union Council. It has a population of approximately 3,600, 70% of whom are educated. It has 2,177

- Government secondary boys' school
- Government secondary girls' school
- Government degree college for women
