= Chandiawala =

- Location within Pakistan
- Coordinates: 30.58°N 70.52°E
- Country: Pakistan
- Province: Punjab
- District: Layyah
- Elevation: 138 m (453 ft)
- Time zone: UTC+5 (PST)

Chandiawala is a village of Layyah District in Punjab, Pakistan. It is located at 30°58'0N 70°52'40E at an altitude of 138 metres (456 feet).
