= Faiz Ul Hassan =

Pakistani politician

Sahibzada Faiz Ul Hassan
- صاحبزادہ فیض الحسن

Member of the National Assembly of Pakistan
- In office 1 June 2013 – 31 May 2018
- Constituency: NA-181 (Layyah-I)

Personal details
- Born: January 1, 1952 (age 74)
- Party: PPP (2025-present)
- Other political affiliations: PMLN (2013-2025)

Sahibzada Faiz Ul Hassan (Urdu: صاحبزادہ فیض الحسن; born 1 January 1952) is a Pakistani politician who was a member of the National Assembly of Pakistan from June 2013 to May 2018.

== Political career ==
Faiz Ul Hassan ran for a seat in the National Assembly of Pakistan as a candidate of the Pakistan Muslim League (N) (PML-N) from the Constituency NA-181 (Layyah-I) in the 2002 Pakistani general election but was unsuccessful. He received 56,490 votes and lost the seat to Sardar Bahadur Ahmed Khan.

He ran for the seat of the National Assembly as a candidate of PML-N from Constituency NA-181 (Layyah-I) in the 2008 Pakistani general election but was unsuccessful. He received 56,951 votes and lost the seat to Sardar Bahadur Ahmed Khan.

He was elected to the National Assembly as a candidate of PML-N from Constituency NA-181 (Layyah-I) in the 2013 Pakistani general election. He received 119,403 votes and defeated Sardar Bahadur Ahmed Khan of PPP.

He ran for the seat of the National Assembly as a candidate of PML-N from NA-187 (Layyah-I) but was unsuccessful. He received 64,582 votes and lost the seat to Abdul Majeed Khan.
