= Jokalian =

Coordinates: 32°24′04″N 73°47′13″E

Jokalian is a village in Mandi Bahauddin District in the Punjab province of Pakistan.

== Notable people ==
- Mustansar Hussain Tarar
