= Udhowala =

- Location within Pakistan
- Coordinates: 30.59°N 70.54°E
- Country: Pakistan
- Province: Punjab
- Elevation: 136 m (446 ft)
- Time zone: UTC+5 (PST)

Udhowala is a village in the Layyah District of Punjab, Pakistan. It is located at 30°59'50N 70°54'0E with an altitude of 136 metres (449 feet).
