= Sardar Bahadur Ahmed Khan =

Pakistani politician

Member of the National Assembly of Pakistan
- In office 2002–2013
- Constituency: NA-181 (Layyah-I)

Personal details
- Party: PMLN (2025-present)
- Other political affiliations: PPP (2021-2025); Independent (2018-2021); PTI (2014–2018); PPP (2013–2014); PML-Q (2002–2013)

Sardar Bahadur Ahmed Khan Sehar is a Pakistani politician who had been a member of the National Assembly of Pakistan from 2002 to 2013. He remained a member of the federal cabinet as Minister for Defence Production from 2011 to 2013.

== Political career ==
Khan was elected to the National Assembly of Pakistan from Constituency NA-181 (Layyah-I) as a candidate of Pakistan Muslim League (Q) (PML-Q) in the 2002 Pakistani general election. He secured 86,247 votes and defeated Faiz Ul Hassan, a candidate of Pakistan Muslim League (N) (PML-N).

Khan was re-elected to the National Assembly from Constituency NA-181 (Layyah-I) as a candidate of PML-Q in the 2008 Pakistani general election. He secured 58,797 votes and defeated Faiz Ul Hassan. During his second tenure as Member of the National Assembly, he was inducted into the federal cabinet of Prime Minister Yousaf Raza Gillani and was made federal minister for defence production where he remained from May 2011 to June 2012. He was inducted into the federal cabinet of Prime Minister Raja Pervaiz Ashraf and was made federal minister for defence production where he remained from June 2012 to March 2013.

Khan ran for the seat of National Assembly from NA-181 (Layyah-I) as a candidate of Pakistan Peoples Party (PPP) in the 2013 Pakistani general election but was unsuccessful. He secured 81,393 and lost the seat to Faiz Ul Hassan, a candidate of PML-N.

Khan ran for the seat of National Assembly from NA-187 (Layyah-I) as an independent candidate in the 2018 Pakistani general election but was unsuccessful. He secured 88,544 votes and lost the seat to Abdul Majeed Khan Niazi, a candidate of Pakistan Tehreek-e-Insaf (PTI).
