= Metlawala =

- Location within Pakistan
- Coordinates: 30.57°N 70.51°E
- Country: Pakistan
- Province: Punjab
- Elevation: 137 m (449 ft)
- Time zone: UTC+5 (PST)

Metlawala is a village in Layyah District of the Punjab province of Pakistan. It is located at 30°57'30N 70°51'30E with an altitude of 137 metres (452 feet).
