= Niaz Ahmed Jhakkar =

Pakistani politician (1954–2026)

Member of the National Assembly of Pakistan
- In office 13 August 2018 – 25 January 2023
- Constituency: NA-188 (Layyah-II)
- In office 2002–2007
- Constituency: NA-182 Layyah-II

Personal details
- Born: 18 July 1954 Layyah, West Punjab, Pakistan
- Died: 11 March 2026 (aged 71) Layyah, Punjab, Pakistan
- Party: PTI (2014–2026)
- Other political affiliations: IND (2013–2014); PML(Q) (2008–2013); PPP (2002–2007)
- Children: Malik Awais Jakhar (son)

Niaz Ahmed Jhakkar (Urdu: نیاز احمد جاکھر or Urdu: نیاز احمد جکھڑ; 18 July 1954 – 11 March 2026) was a Pakistani politician who served as a member of the National Assembly of Pakistan from August 2018 till January 2023.

== Political career ==
Jhakkar was elected to the National Assembly of Pakistan from NA-139 Layyah-I as a candidate of the Pakistan People's Party (PPP) in the 1988 Pakistani general election. He received 43,056 votes and defeated Syed Muhammad Khurshid Ahmed Shah Bukhari, a candidate of Pakistan Awami Ittehad.

He contested the 1990 Pakistani general election from NA-139 Layyah-I as a candidate of the Pakistan Democratic Alliance (PDA), but was unsuccessful. He received 43,180 votes and was defeated by Syed Muhammad Khurshid Ahmed Shah Bukhari, a candidate of Islami Jamhoori Ittehad (IJI).

Jhakkar was re-elected to the National Assembly from NA-139 Layyah-I as a candidate of PPP in the 1993 Pakistani general election. He received 64,650 votes and defeated Malik Ghulam Haider Thind, a candidate of the Pakistan Muslim League (N) (PML(N)).

He contested the 1997 Pakistani general election from NA-139 Layyah-I as a candidate of PPP, but was unsuccessful. He received 37,933 votes and was defeated by Malik Ghulam Haider Thind, a candidate of the PML(N).

Jhakkar was re-elected to the National Assembly from NA-182 Layyah-II as a candidate of the Pakistan People's Party (PPP) in the 2002 Pakistani general election. He received 74,932 votes and defeated Malik Ghulam Haider Thind, a candidate of the Pakistan Muslim League (Q) (PML(Q)).

He contested the 2008 Pakistani general election from NA-182 Layyah-II as a candidate of PML(Q), but was unsuccessful. He received votes and was defeated by Syed Muhammad Saqlain Shah Bukhari, a candidate of PML(N).

Jhakkar contested the 2013 Pakistani general election from NA-182 Layyah-II as an independent candidate, but was unsuccessful. He received 74,719 votes and was defeated by Syed Muhammad Saqlain Shah Bukhari, a candidate of the PML(N).

He joined Pakistan Tehreek-e-Insaf (PTI) on 7 December 2014.

Jhakkar was elected to the National Assembly of Pakistan from NA-188 (Layyah-II) as a candidate of PTI in the 2018 Pakistani general election. He received 109,854 votes and defeated Syed Muhammad Saqlain Shah Bukhari, a candidate of the PML(N).

== Death ==
Jhakkar died in his hometown of Layyah, Punjab, on 11 March 2026, at the age of 71.

== See also ==
- List of members of the 15th National Assembly of Pakistan
