= Manzoor Hussain Soomra =

Pakistani Politician

Member of the National Assembly of Pakistan
- In office 1970–1977
- Constituency: NW-90 (Muzaffargarh I)

Personal details
- Born: Mehr Manzoor Hussain Soomra
- Parent: Mahr Qadir Bakhsh Soomra (father)
- Relatives: Fazal Hussain Soomra (brother)
- Occupation: Politician

Mehr Manzoor Hussain Soomra is a Pakistani politician who was member of National Assembly of Pakistan from 1970 to 1977 from NW-90 Muzaffargarh I.
