= Tarar (clan) =

- Jāti: Jat
- Religions: Islam
- Languages: Punjabi
- Country: Pakistan
- Region: Punjab
- Ethnicity: Punjabi
- Related groups: Jats

Tarar is a Jat clan of Punjabis found in the Punjab region of Pakistan.

== Notable people ==
Notable people with this surname include:

- Azam Nazeer Tarar, Senator, Federal Minister for Law and Justice
- Muhammad Rafiq Tarar (born 1929), Pakistani politician, former President of Pakistan
- Mustansar Hussain Tarar (born 1939), Pakistani author and television personality
- Amir Sultan Tarar, the "Colonel Imam", Army general, SSG member, ISI intelligence officer,Father of Taliban
- Mumtaz Ahmed Tarar, Pakistani politician
- Bilal Farooq Tarar, Pakistani politician
- Saira Afzal Tarar, Pakistani politician
- Mamoon Jaffar Tarar, Pakistani politician
