= Maksi Jain temple =

Jain temples in Maksi, Madhya Pradesh

Maksi Jain temples
- Maksi Pārśvanātha
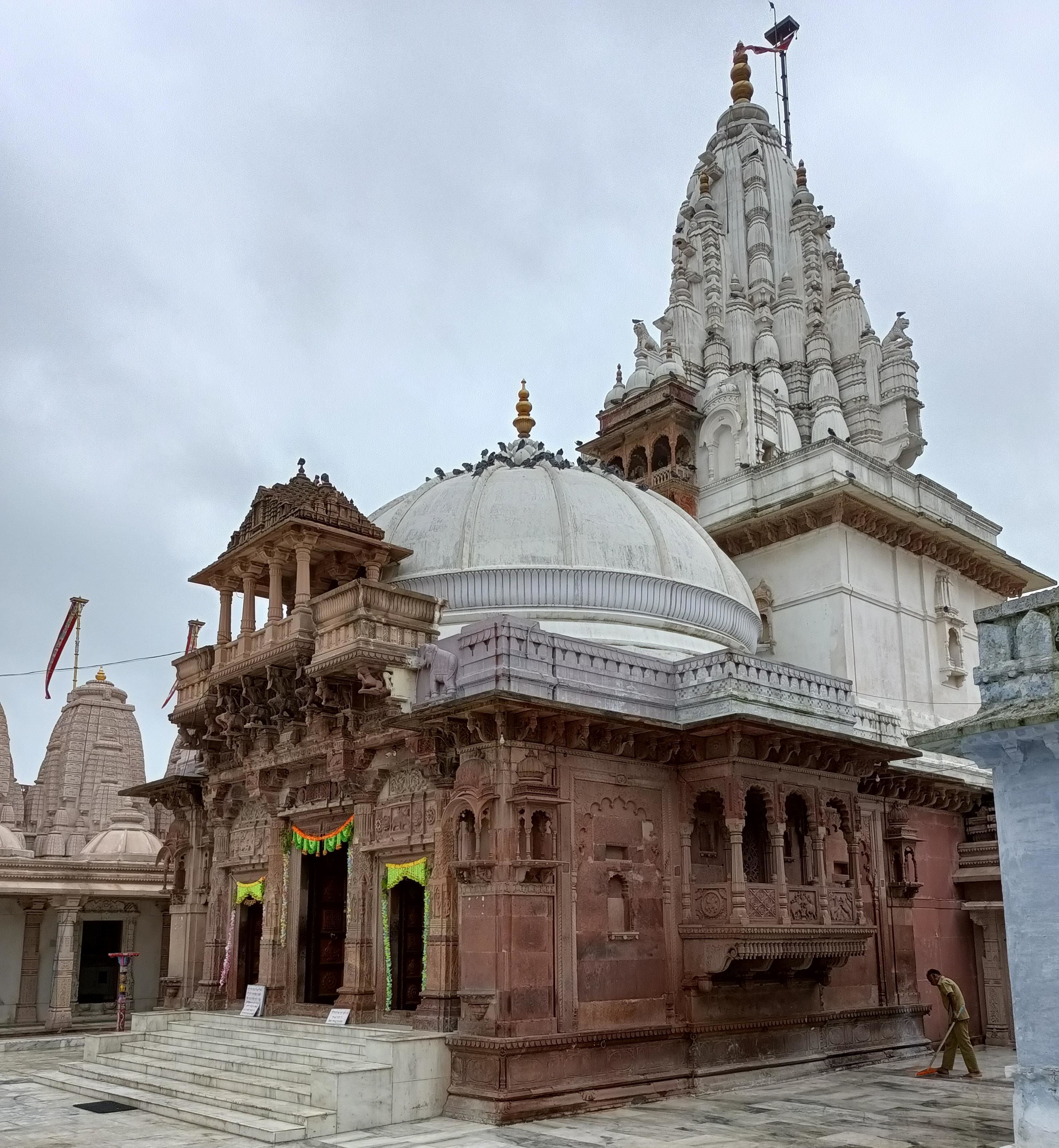
- Maksi Jain temple

- Location within Madhya Pradesh

Religion
- Affiliation: Jainism
- Sect: Digambara and Śvētāmbara
- Deity: Parshvanatha and Suparshvanatha
- Governing body: Shri Digambar Jain Atishaya Kshetra Maksi Parsvanath Maksi; Anandji Kalyanji Trust

Location
- Location: Maksi, Shajapur, Madhya Pradesh
- Coordinates: 23°15′32.6″N 76°08′40″E

Architecture
- Type: Jain temple
- Creator: Paramara dynasty
- Established: 10th century
- Temple: 2

Maksi Jain temple are a group of historic Jain temples in Maksi, Shajapur district, Madhya Pradesh, India. Maksi is an important Jain pilgrimage centre for both Digambara and Śvētāmbara.

== Temple ==
Maksi is an important Jain centre constructed in 10th century during the reign of Paramaras. The Jain temple complex is sacred to both Digambara and Śvētāmbara and comprises two temples. The larger temple called Bada Mandir is dedicated to Parshvanatha and second temple, established in 1842 CE, is dedicated to Suparshvanatha. The complex also enshrines 42 Jain images installed by Jivaraj Papriwal in 1491 CE.

An inscription, dated 1725 CE, records the meeting of Sri Sangha at Avanti (Ujjain) to discuss repairs to the temple by mason — Suba Bahadur and Rupa a mason. Another inscription, dated 1856 CE, on a doorway records construction of shikhara by Jambhan, wife of Sadbhana of Ujjain and Udayachand, son of Pannalal, and Dalalchi offered kalasa for the shikhara and a ceramony was performed by Kalyanavijaya from the lineage of Jaina Acharya Vijayadevendrara Surisvara.

== Festival ==
Maksi as having a famous large Jain temple dedicated to Parshvanatha and records an annual nine-day fair held in April in his honour.

== See also ==
- Pawagiri Jain temple
- Chaubara Dera No. 2
