= Mahar Ijaz Ahmad Achlana =

Pakistani politician

Member of the Provincial Assembly of the Punjab
- In office 15 August 2018 – 14 January 2023
- Constituency: PP-283 Layyah-IV
- In office October 2002 – May 2018

Personal details
- Born: 15 January 1966 (age 60) Layyah District, Punjab, Pakistan
- Party: PMLN (2002-present)

Punjab Assembly Lahore

Mahar Ijaz Ahmad Achlana is a Pakistani politician who is a Member of the Provincial Assembly of the Punjab for four consecutive terms, from October 2002 to january 2023. He is currently serving as the president of the Pakistan Muslim League (N) (PML-N) for the Dera Ghazi Khan Division.

== Early life and education ==
He was born on 15 January 1966 in Layyah District.

He has graduated in Law.

== Political career ==
He was elected to the Provincial Assembly of the Punjab as a candidate of Pakistan Muslim League (N) (PML-N) from Constituency PP-265 (Layyah-IV) in the 2002 Pakistani general election.

He was re-elected to the Provincial Assembly of the Punjab as a candidate of PML-N from Constituency PP-265 (Layyah-IV) in the 2008 Pakistani general election.

He was elected to the Provincial Assembly of the Punjab as a candidate of PML-N from Constituency PP-265 (Layyah-IV) in the 2013 Pakistani general election.

In December 2013, he was appointed Parliamentary Secretary for home.

In November 2016, he was inducted into the provincial Punjab cabinet of Chief Minister Shehbaz Sharif and was made Provincial Minister of Punjab for Disaster Management.

He was re-elected to Provincial Assembly of the Punjab as a candidate of PML-N from Constituency PP-283 (Layyah-IV) in the 2018 Pakistani general election.
