= Ashu Lal Faqeer =

Pakistani Saraiki poet (born c. 1953)

Ashu Lal Faqeer اشو لال فقیر
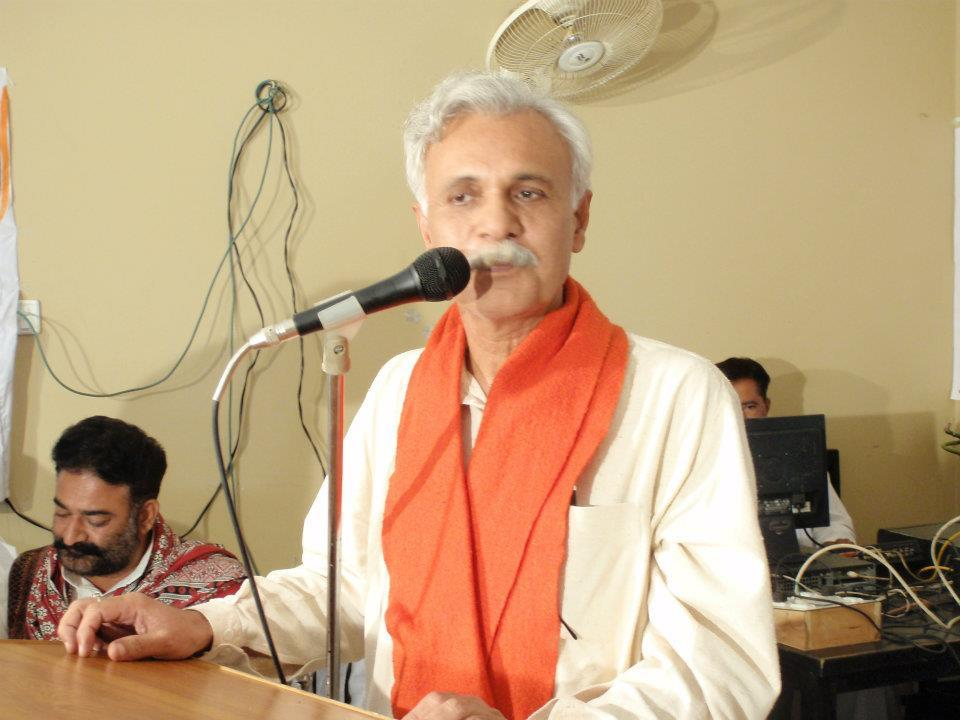
- Faqeer around 2012
- Born: Muhammad Ashraf; 13 April 1959 (age 66) Karor Lal Esan, Layyah District, Pakistan
- Language: Saraiki
- Notable works: Jaal Maloti

Ashu Lal Faqeer (Note: Urdu: اشو لال فقیر) (birth name Muhammad Ashraf; born 13 April 1959) is a Pakistani Saraiki-language poet from Karor Lal Esan. Ashu Lal Faqeer is a qualified medical doctor who completed his MBBS from Quaid-e-Azam Medical College, Bahawalpur.

== Books ==
He has published books of poetry:

- Chairroo Hath Nah Murli (The Shepherd without a Flute) چارو ہتھ نہ مرلی
- Gautam Naal Jhairra (Arguments with Gautam) 1995
- Kaan Wassu Da Pakhi Aey (Crow is Bird of Human Abode) 1997
- Sindh Sagar Naal Hameshaan (Always with River Sindh) 2002
- Jaal Maloti (A Meeting Place)

and two collections of short stories, Abnormal and Bairri (Boat).

== Awards ==
He was awarded Kamal-i-Fun, the top literary award from the Pakistan Academy of Letters, but he refused to accept it and described the Pakistani "deep state" as fascist.

== See also ==
- Shakir Shuja Abadi
