= Pawagiri Jain temple =

Jain temple in the state of Madhya Pradesh

- ग्वालेश्वर मंदिर
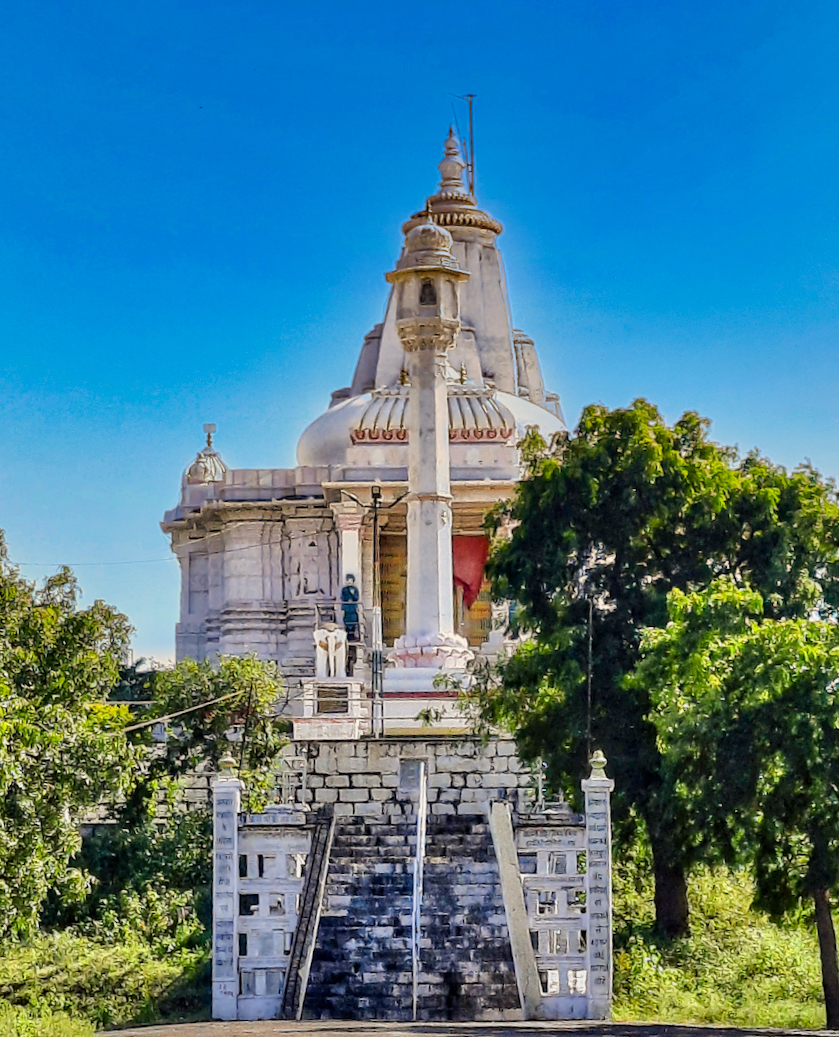
- Gvaleshwar temple

- Location within Madhya Pradesh

Religion
- Affiliation: Jainism
- Sect: Digambara
- Deity: Shantinatha
- Festival: Mahavir Jayanti

Location
- Location: Oon village, Khargone, Madhya Pradesh
- Coordinates: 21°49′14.2″N 75°27′15″E

Architecture
- Style: Nagara architecture
- Established: 13th century

Pawagiri Jain Temple or Gvaleshwar temple is a Jain temple located in Oon village, Khargone district in the state of Madhya Pradesh.

== History ==
The temple was constructed by Jain merchants who migrated from Malwa following the annexation of King Kumarapala of Chaulukya dynasty in 1150 CE. The triratha pedestal of the Tirthankara idol inside the temple bears an inscription dated 1263 CE (V.S. 1321). The temple belongs to the important Hindu and Jain temple group of at Oon during medieval period.

The dated Jain inscriptions are particularly important for establishing the chronology of the religious complex. An inscription associated with the pedestal of a Tirthankara image is dated 1263 CE. A separate inscription associated with the monumental image of Shantinatha has been dated to 1206 CE.

== About temple ==
The temple plan is similar to Chaubara Dera No. 2 another Jain temple in Oon temple complex. The temple features a square maṇḍapa with four doors, three lead to outside and one leads to garbhagriha of the temple. The square mandapa and its four entrances distinguish the plan of the temple, while the sanctuary is approached through one of these openings..

The temple is a siddha kshetras, site of moksha (liberation) for Jain monks. The temple is called Gvaleshwar as gvālas (cow herders) used to take shelter here during storms. The designation "Gvaleshwar" is therefore associated with a local tradition concerning cowherds rather than with the identity of the principal Tirthankara image. The mulnayak is a 12.5 feet (3.8 m) black coloured idol tall of Shantinatha that bears an inscription dated 1206 CE. The monumental Shantinatha is one of the principal surviving medieval Jain sculptures at Oon. The inscription provides important evidence for dating Jain patronage at the site.

This temple is protected by Archaeological Survey of India.

== Architecture ==
Pawagiri Jain temple is constructed with Nagara architecture with plan consists of a sanctuary connected to a square mandapa, the latter having four doorways. The temple's plan has been compared with that of Chaubara Dera 2, another monument at Oon, indicating architectural relationships between the Jain and other medieval temples of the settlement. The surviving sculptural programme is dominated by the large black stone image of Shantinatha in the sanctuary. Together with the other polished Jina images on the principal vedi, it forms the main devotional focus of the temple.

== Inscriptions ==
At least two dated inscriptional references are associated with the Jain remains at Pawagiri. An inscription on the triratha pedestal of a Tirthankara image bears the date V.S. 1321, corresponding to 1263 CE. The monumental 12.5-foot (3.8 m) image of Shantinatha is associated with another inscription dated 1206 CE. These dated records provide a chronological framework for Jain activity at Oon during the 13th century and are particularly valuable because the surviving temple complex contains structures and sculptures belonging to different phases.

== See also ==
- Jain temples of Khajuraho
- Paramara dynasty
- Chaubara Dera No. 2
- Maksi Jain temple
