= Chaubara Tehsil =

Tehsil subdivision in Punjab, Pakistan

Chaubara Tehsil تحصیل چَوبارا
- Tehsil
- Location in Punjab Location in Pakistan
- Coordinates: 30°54′27.1″N 71°30′20.9″E
- Country: Pakistan
- Region: (Punjab, Pakistan) Punjab
- Division: Dera Ghazi Khan
- District: Layyah
- Towns: 1
- Union councils: 14

Area
  - Tehsil: 2,754 km^{2} (1,063 sq mi)

Population (2023 Census of Pakistan)
  - Tehsil: 299,082
  - Density: 108.6/km^{2} (281.3/sq mi)
  - Urban: 57,002 (19.06%)
  - Rural: 242,080 (80.94%)

Literacy (2023)
  - Literacy rate: 58.42%
- Time zone: UTC+5 (PST)

Chaubara (Urdu: چَوبارہ , Punjabi: تحصیل چوبارا) is a tehsil located in Layyah District, in Dera Ghazi Khan Division, Punjab, Pakistan. The market town of Chaubara is the administrative headquarters of the tehsil. Chaubara is the least populated tehsil in Punjab, with a total population of 252,200, according to the 2023 Pakistani census. Of this total population, 80.9% lives in rural areas and 19.1% in urban areas.

It is the largest tehsil in Layyah District, followed by the Layyah and Karor Lal Esan, all of which total a land area of 6,291 square kilometres.

== Union councils ==
Tehsil Chaubara consists of seven union councils i.e. Nawankot, Khaira wala, Jamal Choupre, Sher Garh, Rafique Abad, Aulaq Thal Kalan and Chaubara.

== Demographics ==
=== Population ===
Historical population
Year	Pop.	±% p.a.
1951	16,580	—
1961	35,986	+8.06%
1972	65,371	+5.58%
1981	94,572	+4.19%
1998	161,010	+3.18%
2017	252,540	+2.40%
2023	299,082	+2.86%

As of the 2023 census, Chaubara Tehsil has population of 299,083.

=== Languages ===
Languages of Chaubara Tehsil (2023)
1. Saraiki (62.8%)
2. Punjabi (32.8%)
3. Pashto (2.88%)
4. Urdu (0.43%)
5. Others (1.14%)

At the time of the 2023 census, 62.76% of the population spoke Saraiki, 32.80% Punjabi, 2.88% Pashto and 0.43% Urdu as their first language.

== Occupations ==
The majority of residents are farmers by profession and raise domestic animals for milk and meat. Small ruminants are a basic source of income, and black and white grams are the most cultivated crops in this area. Wheat and cotton are also grown. This area has potential for forest cultivation since underground water provides favourable conditions.

The proposed Phase-II of the Greater Thal Canal is expected to irrigate a large area of land and improve the local production as well as the GDP of Pakistan.

== Weather ==
Weather is relatively hot but nights in the desert of Thal are relatively cold even in summer. Maximum temperature in summer can reach up to 48°C during the day and about 30°C at night. Winter always remains mild except from mid-December till mid-January.

== Desert ==
A part of Thal Desert falls in the region of Chaubara. The Thal Jeep desert rally and camel dance festival are annual events in the region. This region is least developed area in terms of education, health, roads, electricity and clean water in entire Punjab. Over 99% people of Nawankot, Khaira wala and Sher Garh lives below poverty lines.
