= Syed Muhammad Saqlain Shah Bukhari =

Pakistani politician

- سید محمد ثقلین

Member of the National Assembly of Pakistan
- In office 1 June 2013 – 31 May 2018
- Constituency: NA-182 (Layyah-II)

Personal details
- Born: January 1, 1961 (age 65)
- Party: PMLN

Syed Muhammad Saqlain Shah Bukhari (Urdu: سید محمد ثقلین شاہ بخاری; born 1 January 1961) is a Pakistani politician who had been a member of the National Assembly of Pakistan, from June 2013 to May 2018.

== Early life ==
He was born on 1 January 1961.

== Political career ==
He ran for the seat of the National Assembly of Pakistan as a candidate of Pakistan Muslim League (N) (PML-N) from Constituency NA-182 (Layyah-II) in the 2002 Pakistani general election but was unsuccessful. He received 32,247 votes and lost the seat to Malik Niaz Ahmed Jhakkar, a candidate of Pakistan Peoples Party (PPP).

He was elected to the National Assembly as a candidate of PML-N from Constituency NA-182 (Layyah-II) in the 2008 Pakistani general election. He received 75,910 votes and defeated Malik Niaz Ahmed Jhakkar, a candidate of Pakistan Muslim League (Q) (PML-Q).

He was re-elected to the National Assembly as a candidate of PML-N from Constituency NA-182 (Layyah-II) in the 2013 Pakistani general election. He received 85,292 votes and defeated Malik Niaz Ahmed Jhakkar, a candidate of PPP. During his tenure as Member of the National Assembly, he served as Federal Parliamentary Secretary for Planning and Development and Inter Provincial Coordination.

He ran for the seat of the National Assembly of Pakistan as a candidate of Pakistan Muslim League (N) (PML-N) from Constituency NA-188 (Layyah-II) in 2018 Pakistani general election but was unsuccessful. He received 95,910 votes and was defeated by Malik Niaz Ahmed Jhakkar, a candidate of Pakistan Tehreek-e-Insaf (PTI).
