= Sobha Singhwala =

- Location within Pakistan
- Coordinates: 30.57°N 70.51°E
- Country: Pakistan
- Province: Punjab
- Elevation: 136 m (446 ft)
- Time zone: UTC+5 (PST)

Sobha Singhwala is a village in the Layyah District, in Punjab, Pakistan. It is located at 30°57'50N 70°51'40E with an altitude of 136 metres (449 feet).
