= Chaubara, Pakistan =

City in Punjab, Pakistan

Chaubara چَوبارا
- City
- Location of Chaubara Chaubara (Pakistan)
- Coordinates: 30°54′36″N 71°30′20″E
- Country: Pakistan
- Region: (Punjab, Pakistan) Punjab
- Division: Dera Ghazi Khan
- District: Layyah

Government
  - Type: Municipal Committee
  - Chairman: None (Vacant)

Population (2023 Census of Pakistan)
  - Total: 57,002
- Time zone: UTC+5 (PST)

Chaubara (Urdu: چَوبارہ , Punjabi: چوبارا) is a city located in Layyah District, in Dera Ghazi Khan Division, Punjab, Pakistan.

== Demographics ==
Population

Historical population
| Year | Pop. | ±% p.a. |
|---|---|---|
| 2017 | 48,371 | — |
| 2023 | 57,002 | +2.77% |

According to official 2023 census results, the population of Chaubara city is 57,002.

Languages

Languages of Chaubara MC (2023 Census)
1. Saraiki (71.3%)
2. Punjabi (24.1%)
3. Pashto (2.70%)
4. Urdu (1.40%)
5. Others (0.50%)

According to the 2023 census, Saraiki is the predominant language in Chaubara MC, spoken by 71.3% of the population. It is followed by Punjabi, which is spoken by 24.1%, while Pashto (2.70%), Urdu (1.40%), and other languages (0.50%) account for the remaining demographic.
