= Sindh Sagar Doab =

Geographical region between Indus and Jhelum Rivers in Pakistan

Sindh Sagar Doab سندھ ساگر دوآب
- Natural region
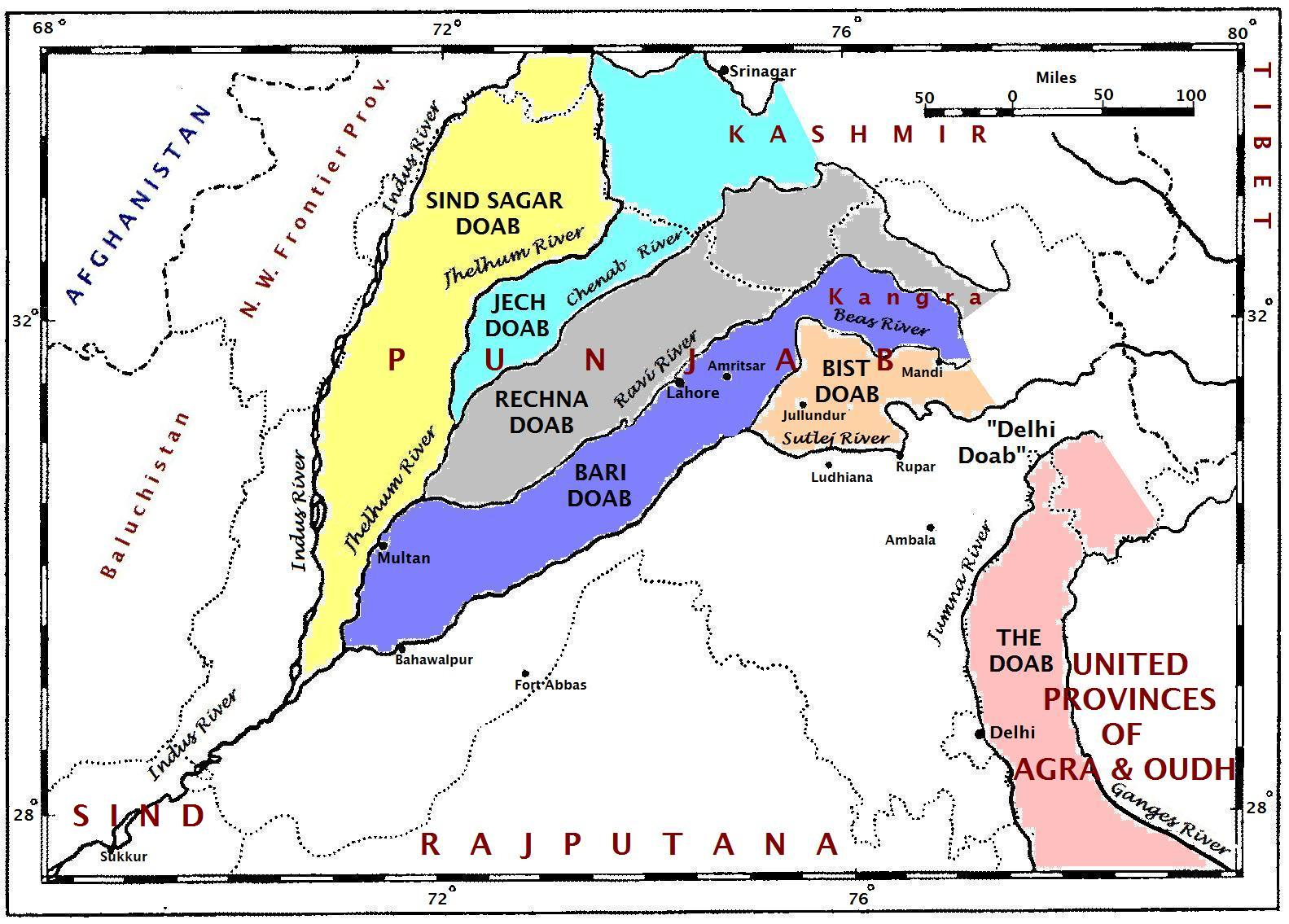
- View of different Doabs of Punjab
- Interactive map of Sindh Sagar Doab
- Country: Pakistan
- Region: Punjab
- Administrative units: Punjab Province; Hazara Division
- Sub-regions: Hazara Hills; Galyat; Pothohar Plateau; Thal Desert

Area
  - Total: 46,190 km^{2} (17,830 sq mi)

Population
  - Total: 18,401,443
  - Density: 398.4/km^{2} (1,032/sq mi)
- Time zone: UTC+5

Sindh Sagar Doab (Punjabi: سندھ ساگر دوآب, romanized: Sind Sāgar Dōāb), sometimes shortened as Sagar Doab, is a Doab or tract of land in the Punjab region, lying between the Indus and Jhelum rivers, in present-day Pakistan. The Doab covers a huge portion of the western areas of the Punjab province and eastern Hazara Division. It is one of the five major Doabs of the Punjab and forms the northwestern portion of the region, covering the Hazara Hills, Galyat, Pothohar Plateau and Thal Desert.

== Geography ==
Compared to the other doabs of Punjab, the Sind Sagar Doab is much more arid. Thus, it is not as conductive to agriculture due to limited rain-fed irrigation and as a result, has a lower population density. However, one notable exception is Rawalpindi, which is densely populated due to its military-importance despite the poor cultivation in the region.

== Districts ==
It covers Attock District, Rawalpindi District, Jhelum District, Chakwal District, Mianwali District, Khushab District, Bhakkar District, Layyah District, Muzaffargarh District and Athara Hazari and Ahmadpur Sial tehsils of Jhang District.

Major areas in this doab include the Kala Chitta Range, Margalla and Murti Hills, Pothohar Plateau, Salt Range and Thal Desert.

Some major cities of this doab are Rawalpindi, Taxila, Attock, Chakwal, Jhelum, Pind Dadan Khan, Talagang, Mianwali, Bhakkar, Layyah, Muzaffargarh, Khushab and Quaidabad.

Of the Punjab doabs, the Sindh Sagar Doab is the largest in land area, but the poorest for agriculture, due to the presence of the Salt Range and Thal Desert.

== Doab ==
The word doab is of Persian origin, signifying the region between two rivers. According to Shaikh Abu'l-Fazl ibn Mubarak, the grand vizier of the Mughal emperor Akbar, and author of the Akbarnama, the names of the doabs were decided by Akbar.

== See also ==
- Rachna Doab
- Chaj Doab
- Bari Doab
