= Chaubara Dera No. 2 =

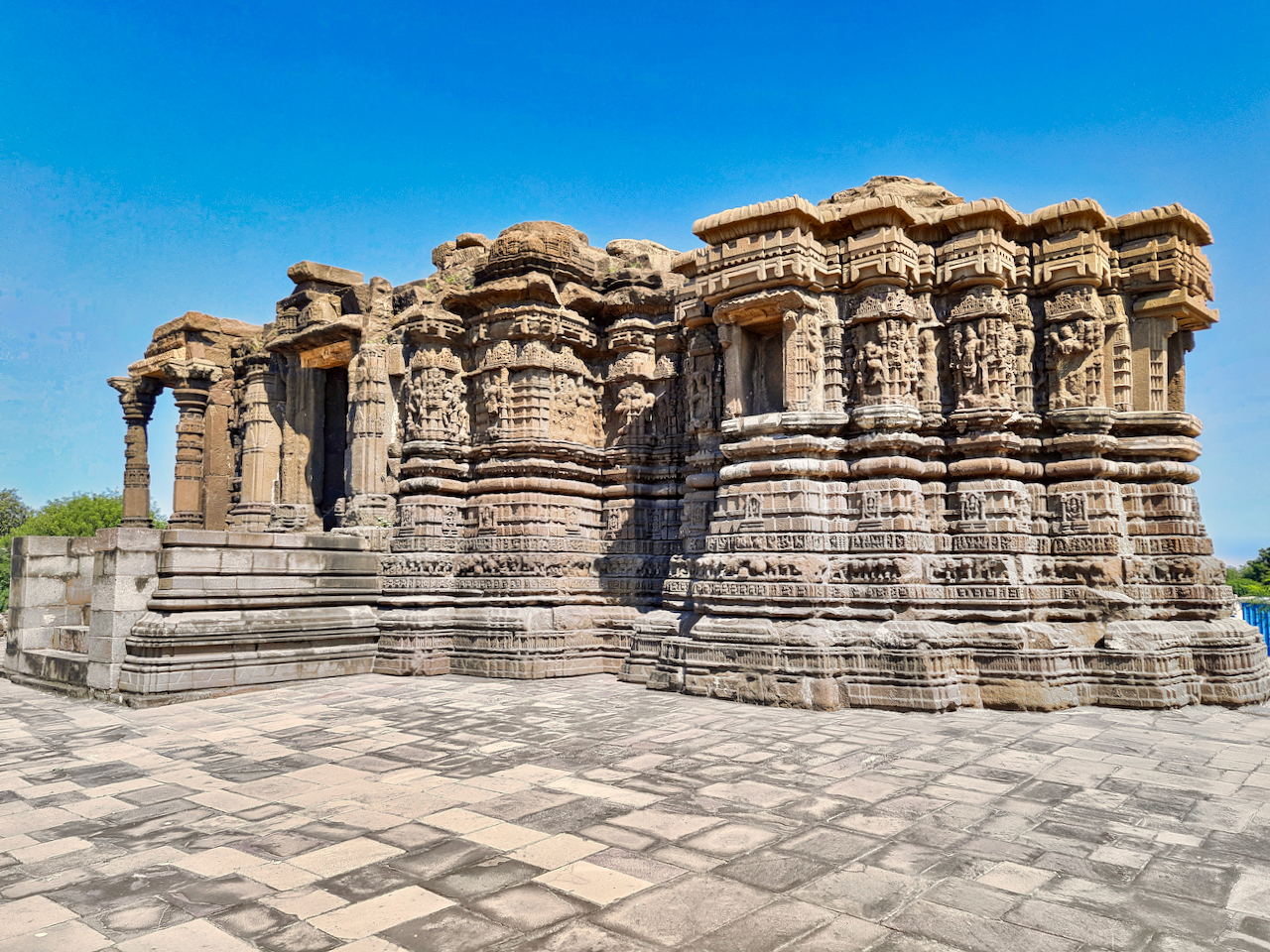
- Chaubara Dera

Religion
- Affiliation: Jainism
- Deity: Shantinatha

Location
- Location: Khargone district, Madhya Pradesh

Architecture
- Established: 1185

Chaubara Dera No. 2 is a temple in the village of Un, in the Indian state of Madhya Pradesh. It is part of a cluster of ruined temples in the village.

== History ==
An inscription on the pedestal of an idol of Shantinatha present within the temple records its date of dedication as the 7th day of the brighter half of the month of Magha in Samvat 1242. This corresponds to 1185 CE.

== Description ==
The mandapa is a square chamber with a round dome, which is supported by 8 pillars.

Two idols from the temple, including the one of Shantinatha have been moved to a museum at Indore.

== See also ==
- Gvaleshwar temple
- Maksi Jain temple
