= Layyah =

Layyah ليّہ Leiah
- City
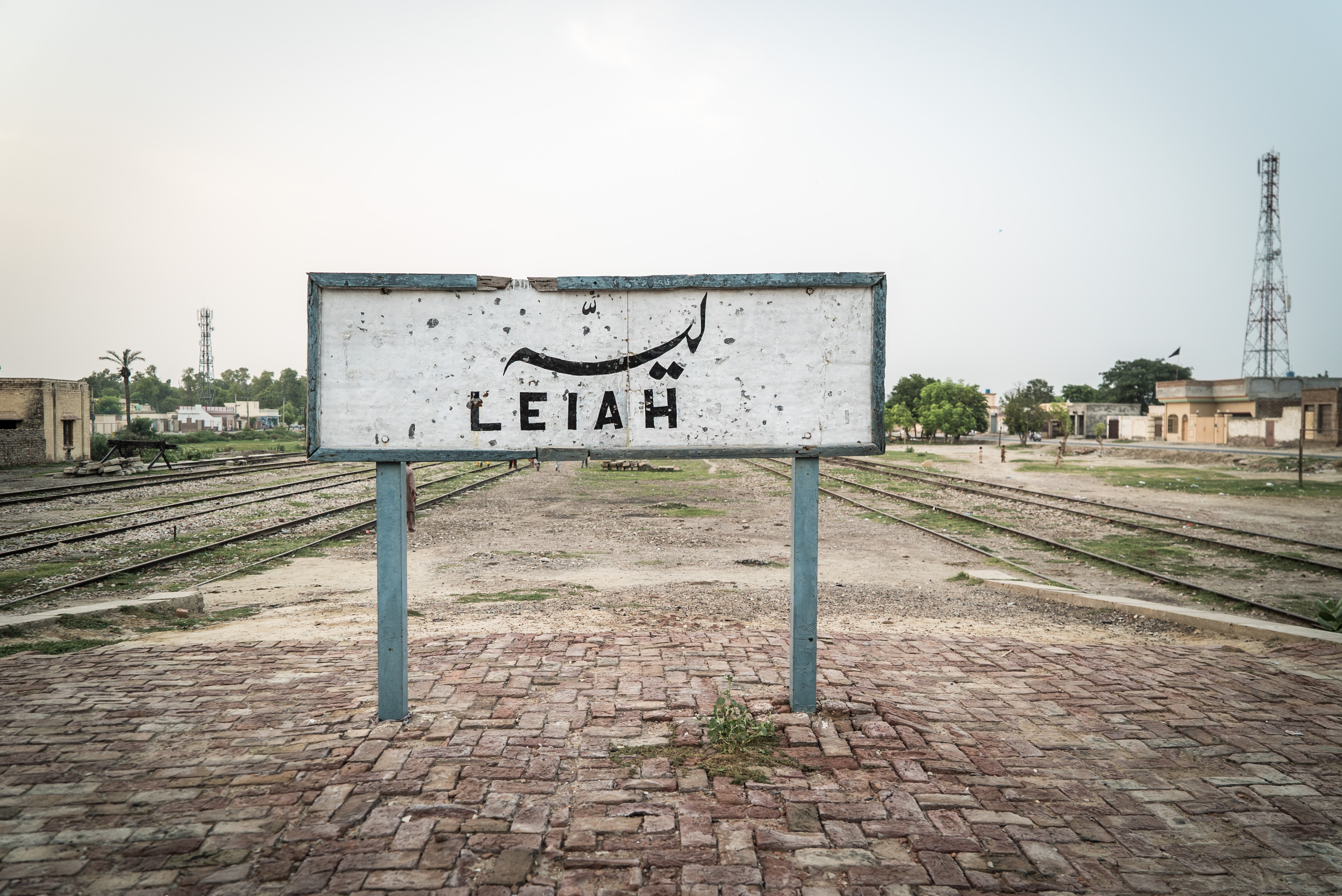
- Layyah Railway Station in c. 2015

- Location within Punjab, Pakistan Location within Pakistan
- Coordinates: 30°57′55″N 70°56′38″E
- Country: Pakistan
- Province: Punjab
- Division: Dera Ghazi Khan
- District: Layyah

Government
  - Type: Municipal Corporation
  - Mayor: N/A

Area
  - Metro: 6,291 km^{2} (2,429 sq mi)
- Elevation: 143 m (469 ft)

Population (2023)
  - City: 151,274
  - Rank: 76th, Pakistan
- Time zone: UTC+5 (PST)
- Postal code: 31200
- Calling code: 0606
- Number of towns: 1
- Number of Union councils: 8
- Website: layyah.punjab.gov.pk

Layyah (Note: Urdu: ليّہ) also spelled as Leiah, is a city in Layyah District of Punjab province of Pakistan. The city is the headquarter of Layyah District and Layyah Tehsil. .

The main languages spoken in the city include Saraiki, Punjabi, and Urdu. It is the 76th most populous city of Pakistan.

== Geography ==
It lies between 30–45 to 31–24 degree north latitudes and 70–44 to 71–50 degree east longitudes. The area consists of a semi-rectangular block of sandy land between the Indus River and the Chenab River in Indus Sagar Doab. Layyah is situated at an average elevation of 143 m above sea level. The total area covered by the district is 6,291 km^{2} with a width from east to west of 88 km and a length from north to south of 72 km.

== History ==
The town was founded around 1550 by Kamal Khan Mirani, a member of Baloch Mirani dynasty and a direct descendant of Ghazi Khan, who laid the foundation of Dera Ghazi Khan. The region was part of Multan Subah of Mughal Empire. Around 1610, the town was taken from the Mirani rulers by the Jaskani Baloch, who held it until 1787. Abdun Nabi Sarai was appointed Governor by Timur Shah Durrani, but three years later, it was included in the Governorship of Muhammad Khan Sadozai, who transferred his seat of Government to Mankera. Pathans also settled the land during the Abdali era of Jahan Khan who was the chief of Durrani forces in the region.

In 1794, Humayun Shah, a rival claimant to the throne of Kabul, was captured near Layyah and brought into the town, where his eyes were gouged out by order of Zaman Shah. Under the Sikh rule, the town once more became the centre of administration for the neighbouring tract, and after the British occupation in 1849, was for a time the headquarters of a Civil Administrative Division. This administrative status of Layyah was short-lived and the British reduced it to the level of Tehsil headquarters, making it a part of Dera Ismail Khan. In 1901, Layyah was transferred to the new District of Mianwali. Later on, it was made part of the District of Muzaffargarh. In 1982, Layyah Tehsil was upgraded to District headquarters comprising three Tehsils: Layyah, Karor and Chaubara. The municipality was created in 1875.

In February 2025, a branch of Pak Tea House, a literary centre, was established in the city.

== Demographics ==
Population

Historical population
| Year | Pop. | ±% p.a. |
|---|---|---|
| 1951 | 14,913 | — |
| 1961 | 19,608 | +2.77% |
| 1972 | 33,549 | +5.00% |
| 1981 | 51,482 | +4.87% |
| 1998 | 72,319 | +2.02% |
| 2017 | 126,055 | +2.97% |
| 2023 | 151,274 | +3.09% |

According to 2023 census, Layyah had a population of 151,274.

Languages

Languages of Layyah MC (2023 Census)
1. Saraiki (67.5%)
2. Urdu (19.8%)
3. Punjabi (11.2%)
4. Others (1.50%)

== Notable people ==
- Lala Harkishen Lal (d. 1937), Indian industrialist and co-founder of Punjab National Bank
- Munir Malik (1934–2012), Pakistani cricketer
- Bahauddin Zakariya, sufi saint
- Mahar Ijaz Ahmad Achlana (b. 1966), Pakistani politician and former member of Provincial Assembly of the Punjab
- Jalat Khan (b. 1999), Pakistani domestic cricketer
- Mehr Abdul Haq (1915–1995), Pakistani philologist
- Mohinder Pratap Chand (1935–2020), Indian writer and poet
- Niaz Ahmed Jhakkar (1958–2026), politician
- Malik Awais Jakhar, politician
- Hassan Nawaz, Pakistani international cricketer

== See also ==
- Chowk Azam
- Fateh Pur
- Karor Lal Esan
