= Muslim Model High School, Lahore =

Coordinates: 31.5760°N 74.3065°E

- Lahore; Pakistan

Information
- School type: Government
- Opened: 1890
- Status: Open
- School board: BISE, Lahore
- Classes offered: Primary, Middle, Matriculation
- Schedule: Day school

Muslim Model High School (Urdu: مسلم ماڈل ہائی اسکول) is a public school situated in Urdu Bazaar, Lahore, Punjab, Pakistan. It is a high school that offers primary education, middle education and matriculation. It is affiliated with Board of Intermediate and Secondary Education, Lahore.

== Notable alumni ==
- Saeed Ahmad, Pakistani cricketer
- Younis Ahmed, Pakistani cricketer
- Amjad Islam Amjad, Pakistani poet
- Muhammad Ilyas, Pakistani cricketer
- Saleem Malik, Pakistani cricketer
- Mudassar Nazar, Pakistani cricketer
- Azmat Rana, Pakistani cricketer
