= Fateh Pur =

Fateh Pur فتح پور
- City
- Location within Pakistan Location within Punjab Fateh Pur (Asia)
- Coordinates: 31°10′41″N 71°12′27″E
- Country: Pakistan
- Province: (Punjab, Pakistan) Punjab
- Division: DG Khan
- District: Layyah

Population (2023)
  - Total: 52,255
  - Rank: 3rd (Layyah District)
- Time zone: UTC+5 (PST)
- Calling code: 0606

Fateh Pur (/fʌˈteɪ.pʊər/; Urdu: فتح پُور; Urdu pronunciation: [fʌ:θeɪ.pʊ:r]) is a city in Layyah district of Punjab, Pakistan. It was established in the 1980s and acquired the sub-tehsil status on January 7, 2007, in Karor Lal Eason Tehsil. Fateh Pur is the third most populous city in the Layyah district.

== Economy ==
The economy of the area depends upon government jobs, some private jobs and agriculture-related businesses.

=== Major crops ===
Common crops grown in Fateh Pur include cotton, sugarcane, wheat and rice. Gardening and fruit production (dates, mangoes, watermelons, melons, and citrus fruit) are also important. Veterinary development is a common feature of the area. Various animals, including buffaloes, cows, goats, sheep, camels and poultry, are used for dairy and meat production.

== Demographics ==
=== Population ===
Historical population
| Year | Pop. | ±% |
|---|---|---|
| 1998 | 15,748 | — |
| 2017 | 44,084 | +179.9% |
| 2023 | 52,255 | +18.5% |

The results of the 2023 Census determined the population of Fateh Pur city population to be 52,255.
