= Layyah Tehsil =

Layyah Tehsil تحصِيل ليّہ
- Tehsil
- Tehsil Municipal Administration logo
- Country: Pakistan
- Region: (Punjab, Pakistan) Punjab
- District: Layyah
- Capital: Layyah
- Towns: 1
- Union councils: 23

Area
  - Tehsil: 1,712 km^{2} (661 sq mi)

Population (2023)
  - Tehsil: 1,118,575
  - Density: 653.4/km^{2} (1,692/sq mi)
  - Urban: 238,650 (21.34%)
  - Rural: 879,925 (78.66%)

Literacy (2023)
  - Literacy rate: 62.34%
- Time zone: UTC+5 (PST)

Layyah (Urdu: تحصِيل ليّہ) is a tehsil (sub division) of Layyah District, Punjab, Pakistan. It is administratively subdivided into 23 Union Councils, three of which form the tehsil and district capital Layyah.

== History ==
The tehsil was created during British rule in India. At the 1891 census, the population was 113,451. This had risen to 122,578 in 1901, when the tehsil was part of Mianwali District. At the 1901 census, it contained 2 towns - the capital Layyah (population 7,546) and Karor Lal Esan (population 3,243) as well as 118 villages. The land revenue and cess in 1903-4 amounted to 1.6 lakh rupees. The tehsil was divided into the Thal and the Kacchi, the former a high sandy tract to the east and the latter a low-lying strip of country along the Indus. The tehsil was subsequently divided and Karor Tehsil now exists as a separate tehsil.

== Demographics ==
=== Population ===
Historical population
| Year | Pop. | ±% p.a. |
|---|---|---|
| 1951 | 96,228 | — |
| 1961 | 145,144 | +4.20% |
| 1972 | 256,448 | +5.31% |
| 1981 | 345,634 | +3.37% |
| 1998 | 591,042 | +3.21% |
| 2017 | 977,088 | +2.68% |
| 2023 | 1,118,575 | +2.28% |

As of the 2023 census, Layyah Tehsil has population of 1,118,575.

Languages of Layyah Tehsil (2023)
1. Saraiki (73.1%)
2. Punjabi (20.6%)
3. Urdu (4.20%)
4. Pashto (1.78%)
5. Others (0.38%)

At the time of the 2023 census, 73.07% of the population spoke Saraiki, 20.57% Punjabi, 4.20% Urdu and 1.78% Pashto as their first language.
