= Karor Lal Esan =

Karor Lal Esan كروڑ لعل عيسن
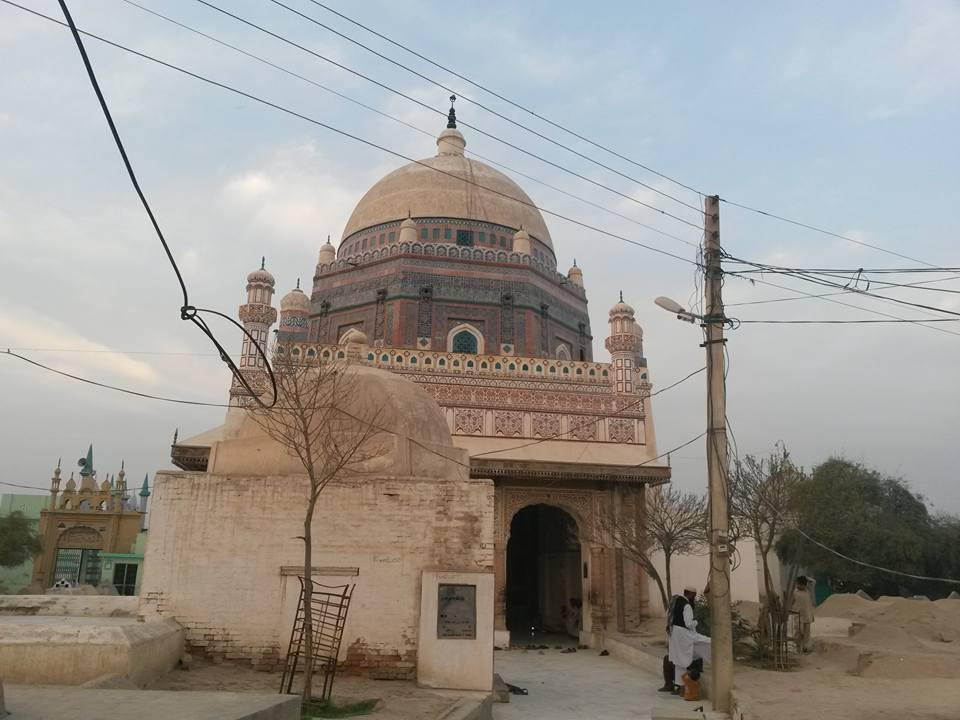
- Shrine of Lal Esan

- Location within Punjab, Pakistan Location within Pakistan
- Coordinates: 31°13′33″N 70°57′03″E
- Country: Pakistan
- Province: Punjab
- District: Layyah

Area
  - Total: 3,721 km^{2} (1,437 sq mi)
- Elevation: 148 m (486 ft)

Population (2023)
  - Total: 38,374
- Time zone: UTC+5 (PST)
- Postal code: 31100
- Calling code: 0606
- Number of towns: 1
- Number of Union councils: 1

Karor Lal Esan (Urdu: كروڑ لعل عيسن) is a city of Layyah District in the Punjab province of Pakistan. The city is the capital of Karor Lal Esan Tehsil and the administrative subdivision of the district.

== Geography ==
The city is located at 31° 13' 33.2472"N 70° 57' 3.189E, at an altitude of 148 metres (488 feet)., to the east of the Indus River and Suleman Mountainous ranges. The lands closer to river are more fertile, especially growing wheat and rice.

=== Climate ===
Karor Lal Esan, as does the whole district of Layyah, has stark differences in weather. Summer lasts from May to September; June is the hottest month with an average monthly temperature of 50 °C with a maximum of up to 53 °C. In winter, however, the December and January temperatures are as low as 0 to 2 °C average monthly.

Month	Jan	Feb	Mar	Apr	May	Jun	Jul	Aug	Sep	Oct	Nov	Dec	Year	
Avg high °C	20	23	28	35	41	43	40	38	38	35	28	23	32	
Avg low temperature °C	4	8	12	18	24	29	28	28	24	17	9	4	17	
Rainfall in. (Cm)	1.2	1.8	3.4	2.4	1.5	1.5	6.1	4.4	1.6	0.5	0.2	0.8	25.4	Source: weatherbase

=== Floods ===
In 2010, the outlying village areas near Karor were flooded from water of the Indus river. Houses and crops were destroyed. After the waters had receded, villagers rebuilt their homes on raised dirt platforms five to six feet high.

== See also ==
- Ashu Lal Faqeer – Pakistani Saraiki poet (born c. 1953)
