= Karor Lal Esan Tehsil =

- Tehsil
- Country: Pakistan
- Region: (Punjab, Pakistan) Punjab
- District: Layyah
- Capital: Karor Lal Esan
- Towns: 1
- Union councils: 14

Area
  - Tehsil: 1,823 km^{2} (704 sq mi)

Population (2023)
  - Tehsil: 684,729
  - Density: 375.6/km^{2} (972.8/sq mi)
  - Urban: 90,630 (13.24%)
  - Rural: 594,099 (86.76%)

Literacy (2023)
  - Literacy rate: 62.43%
- Time zone: UTC+5 (PST)

Karor Lal Esan (Urdu: تحصِيل كروڑ لعل عيسن) is a tehsil (sub-district) of Layyah District in Punjab, Pakistan. It is administratively subdivided into 14 union councils, one of which forms the tehsil capital Karor Lal Esan.

== Demographics ==
=== Population ===
Historical population
| Year | Pop. | ±% p.a. |
|---|---|---|
| 1951 | 49,394 | — |
| 1961 | 92,094 | +6.43% |
| 1972 | 173,718 | +5.94% |
| 1981 | 226,311 | +2.98% |
| 1998 | 368,899 | +2.92% |
| 2017 | 594,367 | +2.54% |
| 2023 | 684,729 | +2.39% |

As of the 2023 census, Karor Lal Esan Tehsil had a population of 684,729.

Languages of Karor Lal Esan Tehsil (2023)
1. Saraiki (58.6%)
2. Punjabi (36.7%)
3. Pashto (2.76%)
4. Urdu (1.40%)
5. Others (0.50%)

At the 2023 census, 58.61% of the population spoke Saraiki, 36.73% Punjabi, 2.76% Pashto and 1.40% Urdu as their first language.

== See also ==
- Chak 98/ML
- Chak 100/ML
- Layyah
- Layyah District
