= Layyah District =

District in Punjab, Pakistan

Coordinates: 30.9602°N 70.9423°E

Layyah District ضِلَع لیّہ
- District of Punjab
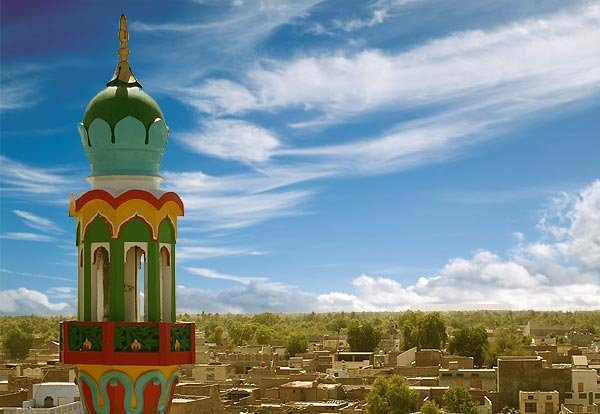
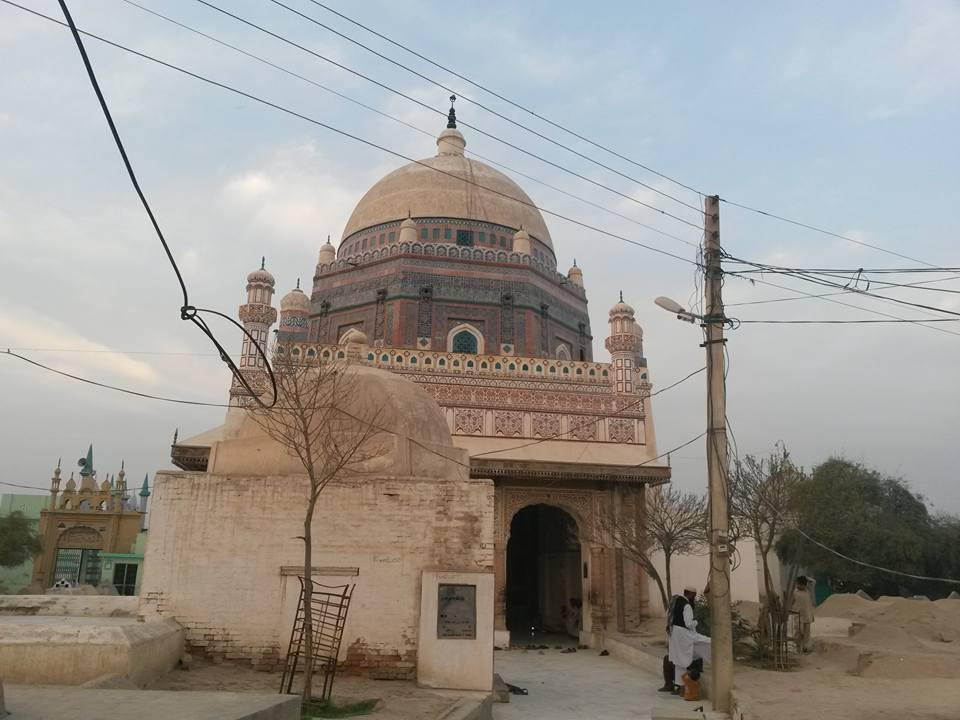
- Top: Old Layyah City; Shrine in Karor Lal Esan

- Map of Layyah District (highlighted in red)
- Country: Pakistan
- Province: Punjab
- Division: Dera Ghazi Khan
- Headquarters: Layyah

Government
  - Type: District Administration
  - Deputy Commissioner: Asif Ali Dogar
  - District Police Officer: Hassan Javaid Bhatti

Area
  - District of Punjab: 6,289 km^{2} (2,428 sq mi)

Population (2023)
  - District of Punjab: 2,102,386
  - Density: 334.3/km^{2} (865.8/sq mi)
  - Urban: 386,282
  - Rural: 1,716,104

Literacy
  - Literacy rate: Total: (61.83%); Male: (70.91%); Female: (52.21%)
- Time zone: UTC+5 (PST)
- Area code: 0606
- Number of Tehsils: 3
- Website: layyah.punjab.gov.pk

Layyah District (Note: Urdu: ضِلَع لیّہ) is a district in the Punjab province of Pakistan. It is located in the south-west of the province. The city of Layyah is the administrative headquarters of Layyah district. Layyah has a hot, semi-arid climate.

== Geography ==
It lies between 30–45 to 31–24 degree north latitudes and 70–44 to 71–50 degree east longitudes. The area consists of a semi-rectangular block of sandy land between the Indus River and the Chenab River in Indus Sagar Doab. The total area covered by the district is 6,291 km^{2,} with a width from east to west of 88 kilometres (55 mi) and a length from north to south of 72 kilometres (45 mi).

== History ==
This administrative status of Layyah was short-lived and the British reduced it to the level of Tehsil headquarters, making it a part of Dera Ismail Khan. In 1901, Layyah was transferred to the new District of Mianwali. Later on, it was made part of the Muzaffargarh District. In 1982, Layyah Tehsil was upgraded to District headquarters comprising three Tehsils: Layyah, Karor and Chaubara. The municipality was created in 1875.

== Administrative divisions ==
The district of Layyah is made up of three tehsils:

Tehsil	Area (km²)	Pop. (2023)	Density (ppl/km²) (2023)	Literacy rate (2023)	Union Councils
Karor Lal Esan	1,823	684,729	375.61	62.43%	
Chaubara	2,754	299,082	108.60	58.42%	
Layyah	1,712	1,118,575	653.37	62.34%	

== Villages ==
- Chak 98 ML
- Chak 90 ML
- Chak 100 ML
- Chandiawala
- Choubara
- Lashari wala
- Metlawala
- Sobha Singhwala
- Udhowala

== Education ==
According to Pakistan District Education Ranking, a report released by Alif Ailaan, Layyah is ranked at number 38 out of 155 districts nationally with an education score of 66.76. The learning score of Layyah is 70.8. The readiness score of Layyah is 65.13, ranking the district at number 31. Furthermore, the school infrastructure score of Layyah is 94.38, placing it a national rank of 18.

== Higher Education ==
=== Public Sector Colleges ===
There are 20 colleges available for the education of males and females of Layyah.

1. Boys 06
2. Girls 09
3. Commerce 05

Total 20

=== Private Sector Colleges ===
1. Boys 08
2. Girls 03
3. Commerce & Business 03

Total 14

=== Public Sector Universities ===
1. University of Layyah

==== Departments ====
- Department of War
- Department of Business Administration
- Department of English
- Department of Economics
- Department of Psychology
- Department of Sociology
- Department of Education
- Department of Information Technology
- Department of Computer Science

==== Colleges ====
- College of Veterinary Sciences
- College of Agriculture

=== Campuses of Public Sector Universities ===
1. Govt. College University Faisalabad (Layyah Campus)
2. University of Education, Lahore (Layyah Campus)
3. Govt. College University, Lahore (Layyah Campus)
4. National College of Business Administration & Economics Lahore (Layyah Campus)

== Floods ==
Sehar village residents of flood-prone Layyah district, had seen their homes repeatedly inundated and they finally took matters into their own hands and rebuilt their homes on raised dirt platforms five to six feet high, shored up with eucalyptus trees planted around the edges.

== Demography ==
Historical population
Year	Pop.	±% p.a.
1951	162,202	—
1961	273,224	+5.35%
1972	495,537	+5.56%
1981	666,517	+3.35%
1998	1,120,951	+3.11%
2017	1,823,995	+2.60%
2023	2,102,386	+2.40%

As of the 2023 census, Layyah district has 341,131 households and a population of 2,102,386. The district has a sex ratio of 106.23 males to 100 females and a literacy rate of 61.83%: 70.91% for males and 52.21% for females. 604,722 (28.76% of the surveyed population) are under 10 years of age. 386,282 (18.37%) live in urban areas.

Religion in Layyah district (2023)
Religion	Percent
Islam	99.23%
Christianity	0.69%
Other or not stated	0.08%

Religion in contemporary Layyah District
Religious group	1941		2017		2023	
Religious group	Pop.	%	Pop.	%	Pop.	%
Islam	138,201	85.8%	1,812,173	99.35%	2,086,076	99.23%
Hinduism (Note: 1941 census: Including Ad-Dharmis)	21,882	13.59%	553	0.03%	242	0.01%
Sikhism	882	0.55%	—N/a	—N/a	27	0%
Christianity	4	0%	9,673	0.53%	14,427	0.69%
Ahmadi	—N/a	—N/a	1,481	0.08%	1,393	0.07%
Others (Note: Including Jainism, Buddhism, Zoroastrianism, Judaism, or not stated)	101	0.06%	115	0.01%	186	0.01%
Total Population	161,070	100%	1,823,995	100%	2,102,361	100%
Note: 1941 census data is for Layyah tehsil of Muzaffargarh District, which roughly corresponds to contemporary Layyah district. District and tehsil borders have changed since 1941.

Languages of Layyah district (2023)
1. Saraiki (66.9%)
2. Punjabi (27.6%)
3. Urdu (2.75%)
4. Pashto (2.26%)
5. Others (0.53%)

At the time of the 2023 census, 66.89% of the population spoke Saraiki, 27.57% Punjabi, 2.75% Urdu and 2.26% Pashto as their first language. The dialect spoken here is Thali, which blends into Multani and Jhangochi.

== Gallery ==
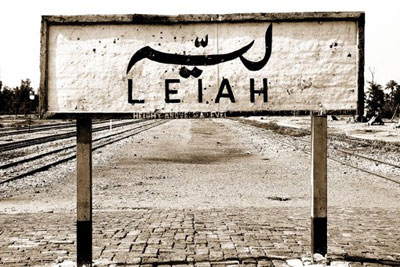
Railway Station Layyah ریلوے سٹیشن لیّہ

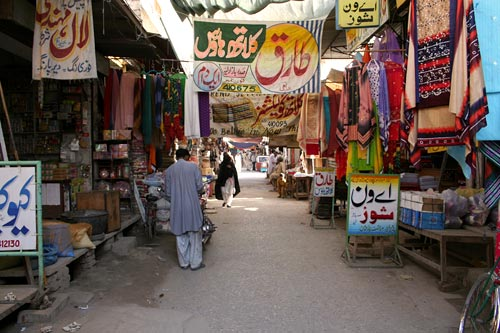
Sadar Bazaar Layyah صدر بازار لیّہ

Vegetable and Fruit Market Layyah سبزی منڈی لیّہ

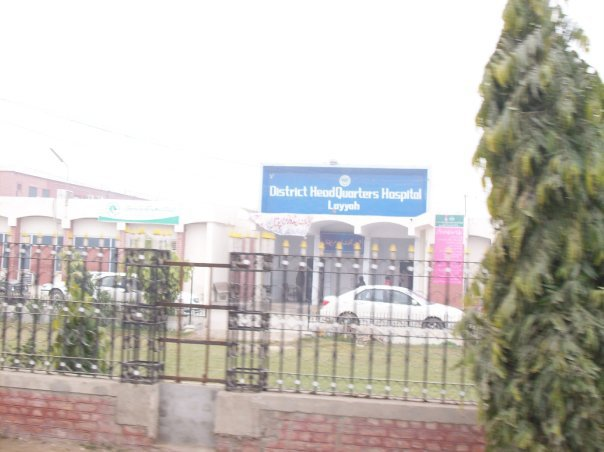
D.H.Q Hospital Layyah

== See also ==
- Chaubara
