= Malik (name) =

Male given name

- Pronunciation: Arabic: [ˈmaːlɪk]
- Gender: Male

Origin
- Origin: Arabic or Greenlandic (unrelated)
- Meaning: Owner (مَالِك); King (مَلِك); Ocean wave (Greenlandic)

Other names
- Alternative spelling: Malek, Maleek, Malick, Mallik, Malyk
- Related names: Melech

Malik, Maleek, Maliq, Malique, Malick, Mallick, Mallik, or Malyk (Arabic: مَالِك or مَلِك) (Urdu & Persian: مالک) (/ˈmælɪk/) is a given name of West Asian Semitic origin. It is both used as first name and surname originally mainly in Western Asia by Christians, Muslims, and Jews of varying ethnicities such as Assyrians, Jews, Arameans, Mandeans and Arabs, before spreading to non-Semitic speaking countries in the Caucasus, South Asia, Central Asia, North Africa, and Southeast Asia, where most, but not all, users are Muslim. Several Semitic language traditions such as Hebrew and Aramaic (including Syriac) use its homonym and other different versions of it. In Arabic, Malik (Malek) مَالِك means owner, and Malyk (Malyeek) مَلِك means king. Its homonym, though other sounding, Moloch also means king or lord in Aramaic (which also uses 'Malek' and 'Malik', as in Assyrian Neo-Aramaic), as does the Modern Hebrew מֶלֶךְ (mélekh). In ancient Akkadian and Eblaite, the terms 'Malka' and 'Malku' were used in Akkad, Ebla, Assyria and Babylonia. These and many other forms in most of the Semitic languages stem from a common Proto-Semitic root. Unrelated to the use in Semitic languages, Malik is also a common first name for men in Greenland (the ninth most common in 2021), and it means "ocean wave" in Greenlandic. Notable people with the name include:

== Given name ==
=== Maleek ===
- Maleek Berry (born 1987), British record producer and recording artist
- Maleek Irons (born 1996), Canadian football player
- Maleek Powell (born 2002), Caymanian footballer

=== Malick ===
- Malick Badiane (born 1984), Senegalese basketball player
- Malick Bolivard (born 1987), Martiniquais footballer
- Malick Dembele (born 2004), Malian footballer
- Malick Diaw (born 1979), Malian military officer and politician
- Malick Diop (born 1942), Senegalese sprinter
- Malick Diouf (born 1999), Senegalese basketball player
- El Hadji Malick Diouf (born 2004), Senegalese footballer
- Malick Evouna (born 1992), Gabonese footballer
- Malick Fall (footballer) (1968–2023), Senegalese footballer
- Malick Fall (swimmer) (born 1985), Senegalese Olympic swimmer
- Malick Fofana (born 2005), Belgian footballer
- Malick Gakou (born 1961), Senegalese politician and economist
- Malick Koly (born 1998), American drummer and singer songwriter
- Malick Korodowou (born 1990), Togolese footballer
- Malick Mané (born 1988), Senegalese footballer
- Malick Mbaye, multiple people
- Malick Ndiaye (born 1982), Senegalese politician
- Malick Sall (born 1956), Senegalese lawyer and politician
- Malick Sanogo (born 2004), American football player
- Malick Seck (1964–2020), Senegalese judoka
- Malick Sidibé (1935/36–2016), Malian photographer
- Malick Sy (1855–1922), Senegalese Sufi leader
- Malick Thiaw (born 2001), German footballer
- Malick Touré (1995–2024), Malian footballer
- Malick Yalcouyé (born 2005), Malian footballer

=== Malik ===
- Malik (artist) (1948–2020), Belgian comic book artist
- Malik Ghulam Abbas (died 2018), Pakistani politician
- Malik Nadeem Abbas, Pakistani politician
- Malik Zaheer Abbas (born 1975), Pakistani politician
- Malik Abubakari (born 2000), Ghanaian footballer
- Malik Ado-Ibrahim (born 1960), Nigerian businessman and politician
- Malik Afegbua, Nigerian filmmaker, artist, and creative technologist
- Malik Mehr un Nisa Afridi (1943–2013), Pakistani lawyer and politician
- Malik Mansoor Afsar, Pakistani politician
- Malik Aftab (Karachi cricketer) (born 1982), Pakistani first-class cricketer
- Malik Aftab (Lahore cricketer) (born 1996), Pakistani first-class cricketer
- Malik Agar (born 1952), Sudanese politician and insurgent leader
- Malik Naseem Ahmed Aheer (born 1936), Pakistani politician
- Malik Mukhtar Ahmad, Pakistani politician
- Malik Zahoor Ahmad, Pakistani diplomat
- Malik Ibrar Ahmed (born 1970), Pakistani politician
- Malik Iftikhar Ahmed (born 1972), Pakistani politician
- Malik Siraj Akbar (born 1983), Pakistani-American journalist
- Malik Akhmedilov (1976–2009), Russian investigative journalist
- Malik Muhammad Akhtar (1915–1999), Pakistani politician
- Malik Barkat Ali (1886–1946), Indian politician, lawyer, and journalist
- Malik Shaukat Ali, Pakistani politician
- Malik Allen (born 1978), American basketball player
- Malik Jamshed Altaf (born 1962), Pakistani politician
- Malik Altunia (died 1240), Indian royal consort
- Malik Ambar (1548–1626), military leader and statesman in the Ahmadnagar Sultanate
- Malik Ambersley (born 1998), American social media personality
- Malik ibn Anas (711–795), Arab Islamic scholar
- Malik Anokha (1943–2008), Pakistani film, television, stage, and radio actor
- Malik Ismaila Antiri (born 1994), Ghanaian footballer
- Malik Muhammad Anwar (born 1950), Pakistani politician
- Malik Ariff (born 1991), Malaysian footballer
- Malik Arslan (died 1465), Beg of Dulkadir
- Malik al-Ashtar (586–658), Arab military commander and tribal leader
- Malik Amin Aslam (born 1966), Pakistani environmentalist and politician
- Malik Asselah (born 1986), Algerian footballer
- Malik Ahmad Ali Aulakh, Pakistani politician
- Malik Falak Sher Awan, Pakistani politician
- Malik Fiaz Ahmad Awan (born 1960), Pakistani politician
- Malik Ghulam Habib Awan (born 1965), Pakistani politician
- Malik Muhammad Javed Iqbal Awan (born 1951), Pakistani politician
- Malik Munawar Khan Awan (1917–1981), Pakistani Army officer
- Malik Naeem Khan Awan (1951–2017), Pakistani politician
- Malik Shafqat Abbas Awan, Pakistani politician
- Malik Shakeel Awan (born 1966), Pakistani politician
- Malik Shakir Bashir Awan (born 1965), Pakistani politician
- Malik Shehzad Awan, Pakistani politician
- Malik Tariq Awan, Pakistani politician
- Malik ibn Awf (died 640), Arab companion of Muhammad
- Malik Ayaz (993–1041), Ghaznavid governor
- Malik Ayyaz, Indian naval officer and governor
- Malik Azmani (born 1976), Dutch politician
- Malik B. (1972–2020), American rapper
- Malik Khalid Mehmood Babar (born 1970), Pakistani politician
- Malik Badri (1932–2021), Sudanese author and professor of psychology
- Malik Sher Bahadur (1911–??), Pakistani major general
- Malik Hasan Bahri (died 1486), noble of the Bahmani Sultanate
- Malik Batmaz (born 2000), German-Turkish footballer
- Malik Ibrahim Bayu (died 1353), Afghan Sufi saint
- Malik Naeem Khan Bazai, Pakistani politician
- Malik Beasley (born 1996), American basketball player
- Malik Bendjelloul (1977–2014), Swedish documentary filmmaker, journalist, and actor
- Malik Benlevi (born 1997), American basketball player
- Malik Benson (born 2002), American football player
- Malik Bentalha (born 1989), French humorist and actor
- Malik Berthelsen, Greenlandic politician
- Malik Beyleroğlu (born 1970), Turkish boxer
- Malik Ahmad Khan Bhachar (born 1968), Pakistani politician
- Malik Tazi Bhat (died 1487), Kashmiri general and warlord
- Malik Blade (born 1998), American wrestler
- Malik Bouziane (born 1978), Algerian boxer
- Malik Boyd (born 1970), American football executive
- Malik Buari (born 1984), Ghanaian footballer
- Malik Khuda Bakhsh Bucha, Pakistani politician
- Malik Pahar Khan Burfat (1684–1741), Sindhi monarch
- Malik Carney (born 1995), American football player
- Malik Muhammad Iqbal Channar (1950–2026), Pakistani politician
- Malik Clements (born 1996), American football player
- Malik Couturier (born 1982), French footballer
- Malik Cunningham (born 1998), American football player
- Malik Curry (born 1999), American basketball player
- Malik Dadashov (1924–1996), Azerbaijani actor
- Malik R. Dahlan (born 1979), Qatari lawyer, mediator, and law professor
- Malik Davis (born 1998), American football player
- Malik Ahmed Hussain Dehar (born 1965), Pakistani politician
- Malik Saeed Dehwar (1918–2005), Pakistani politician
- Malik Delgaty (born 2000), Canadian pornographic actor
- Malik Dia (born 2004), American basketball player
- Malik Dijksteel (born 2001), Dutch footballer
- Malik Dime (born 1992), Senegalese basketball player
- Malik Dinar (died 748), Persian scholar and traveler
- Malik Dinar (general), Indian general
- Malik Dinar (Oghuz chief) (died 1195), Oghuz ruler of Sarakhs
- Malik Dixon (born 1975), American basketball player
- Malik Djibril (born 2003), Togolese footballer
- Malik Sohrab Dodai, Baloch mercenary
- Malik Aamir Dogar (born 1972), Pakistani politician
- Malik Abdul Gafar Dogar (born 1964), Pakistani politician
- Malik Salah-ud-Din Dogar (died 2012), Pakistani politician
- Malik Zulqarnain Dogar (born 1960), Pakistani politician
- Malik Elassal (born 1996), Lebanese-Canadian stand-up comedian and actor
- Malik Ellison (born 1996), American basketball player
- Malik Evans (born 1980), American politician and banker
- Malik Ausean Evans (born 1973), American basketball player
- Malik Faissal (born 2006), Italian rugby union player
- Malik Ghulam Farid (1897–1977), Indian Ahmadiyya Islamic scholar
- Malik Umar Farooq, Pakistani politician
- Malik Fathi (born 1983), German footballer
- Malik Fisher (born 1999), American football player
- Malik Fitts (born 1997), American basketball player
- Malik Flowers (born 1999), American football player
- Malik Frikah (born 2006), French actor and professional breakdancer
- Malik Gabdullin (1915–1973), Kazakh-Soviet writer, professor, philologist, and war veteran
- Malik Gaines (born 1973), American artist, writer, and professor
- Malik Gaisin (born 1959), Russian entrepreneur and politician
- Malik Golden (born 1993), American football player
- Malik Shah Gorgaij, Pakistani politician
- Malik Habib, Pakistani civil servant
- Malik ibn Aus Al-Hadathan, Arab tabi'in and narrator of hadith
- Malik Hairston (born 1987), American basketball player
- Malik Hall (basketball) (born 2000), American basketball player
- Malik Hamadache (born 1988), French-Algerian rugby union player
- Malik Sikandar Khan Hamlani, Pakistani politician
- Malik Hamm (born 2000), American football player
- Malik Ghulam Qasim Hanjra, Pakistani politician
- Malik Harris (born 1997), German-American singer, songwriter, multi-instrumentalist, and rapper
- Malik Harrison (born 1998), American football player
- Malik Hartford (born 2005), American football player
- Malik Hasanov (born 1998), Azerbaijani boxer
- Malik Dohan al-Hassan (1919–2021), Iraqi politician and academician
- Malik Najmul Hassan, Pakistani politician
- Malik Asif Hayat, Pakistani civil servants
- Malik Heath (born 2000), American football player
- Malik Hebbar (born 1973), French footballer
- Malik ter Heerd (born 2002), Sint Maartener footballer
- Malik Henry (quarterback) (born 1998), American football player
- Malik Henry (soccer) (born 2002), Canadian footballer
- Malik Henry (wide receiver) (born 1997), American football player
- Malik Henry-Scott (born 2001), American footballer
- Malik Herring (born 1997), American football player
- Malik Hooker (born 1996), American football player
- Malik Hoskins, American college football coach
- Malik Ahmad Yar Hunjra (born 1960), Pakistani politician
- Malik Jawad Hussain, Pakistani politician
- Malik Ibrahim (died 1419), Arab Islamic missionary
- Malik Muhammad Idrees, Pakistani politician
- Malik Adeel Iqbal, Pakistani politician
- Malik Zafar Iqbal, Pakistani Army general
- Malik Ishaq (1959–2019), Pakistani militant
- Malik Ismail II (1854–1936), Assyrian military leaders
- Malik Jabir (born 1944), Ghanaian footballer
- Malik Jabir (Burundian footballer), Burundian footballer
- Malik Jackson (disambiguation), multiple people
- Malik Awais Jakhar (born 1994), Pakistani politician
- Malik Jakupovic (born 2009), American footballer
- Malik "Fig" James (born 1988), American football player
- Malik James-King (born 1999), Jamaican hurdler
- Malik Muhammad Jayasi (1477–1542), Indian Sufi poet and pir
- Malik Jefferson (born 1996), American football player
- Malik Johnson (basketball) (born 1997), American basketball player
- Malik Johnson (soccer) (born 1998), Canadian footballer
- Malik Sajjad Hussain Joiya (born 1959), Pakistani politician
- Malik Jones (sledge hockey) (born 2002), American ice sled hockey player
- Malik Joyeux (1980–2005), French surfer
- Malik Kafur (died 1316), Indian general
- Malik ibn Dalham al-Kalbi, Abbasid governor of Egypt
- Malik Muhammad Waris Kallu (1951–2021), Pakistani politician
- Malik Nadeem Kamran (1953–2026), Pakistani politician
- Malik ibn Kaydar (died 848), Abbasid military officer
- Malik Meraj Khalid (1916–2003), Pakistani barrister, politician, and philosopher
- Malik Ahmad Khan (born 1971), Pakistani politician
- Malik Ahmad Saeed Khan (born 1975), Pakistani politician
- Malik Ahmed Khan, Pakistani cricket player and umpire
- Malik Aitbar Khan (born 1953), Pakistani politician
- Malik Akora khan Khattak (1550–1600), Chief of the Khattak tribe
- Malik Alaudin Khan, Indian royal
- Malik Allahyar Khan (1927–2008), Pakistani politician
- Malik Ata Muhammad Khan (1937–2020), Pakistani politician
- Malik Mihr Khan (died 1963), Pakistani army officer
- Malik Motasim Khan (born 1967), Indian Islamic scholar
- Malik Muhammad Khan (1736–1784), khan of Baku
- Malik Muhammad Ali Khan, Pakistani politician
- Malik Muzaffar Khan, Pakistani politician
- Malik Noor Saleem Khan (born 1972), Pakistani politician
- Malik Rasheed Ahmed Khan (born 1949), Pakistani politician
- Malik Rashid Ahmed Khan, Pakistani politician
- Malik Riaz Khan (born 1948), Pakistani politician
- Malik Shehzad Ahmed Khan (born 1963), Pakistani jurist
- Malik Sikandar Khan (Balochistan politician), Pakistani politician
- Malik Sikandar Khan (Sindh politician), Pakistani politician
- Malik Sohail Khan, Pakistani politician
- Malik Umar Hayat Khan (1874–1944), Indian soldier
- Malik Ghulam Arbi Khar (1944–2013), Pakistani politician
- Malik Qasim Khan Khattak (1953–2025), Pakistani politician
- Malik al-Tayeb Khojali, Sudanese military official
- Malik Ali Abbas Khokhar (born 1972), Pakistani politician
- Malik Asad Ali Khokhar, Pakistani politician
- Malik Karamat Khokhar, Pakistani politician
- Malik Khalid Pervaz Khokhar, Pakistani politician
- Malik Muhammad Ali Khokhar (born 1971), Pakistani politician
- Malik Saif ul Malook Khokhar (born 1967), Pakistani politician
- Malik Khoshaba (1877–1954), Assyrian military leader
- Malik ibn al-Haytham al-Khuza'i, Abbasid military leader
- Malik Knowles (born 2000), American football player
- Malik Ahmad Karim Qaswar Langrial (born 1971), Pakistani politician
- Malik Louahla (born 1977), Algerian sprinter
- Malik Nosher Khan Anjam Lungerial, Pakistani politician
- Malik Maaza (born 1963), Algerian physicist
- Malik Mack (born 2005), American college basketball player
- Malik Maharramov (1920–2004), Soviet–Azerbaijani soldier and Hero of the Soviet Union
- Malik Fahad Masood, Pakistani politician
- Malik Taimoor Masood (born 1977), Pakistani politician
- Malik M'Baye (1921–1993), French athlete
- Malik McClain (born 2002), American football player
- Malik McDowell (born 1996), American football player
- Malik McLemore (born 1997), German footballer
- Malik Migara (born 1989), Sri Lankan footballer
- Malik Miller (born 1999), American basketball player
- Malik Mohammed (born 1989), Sudanese footballer
- Malik Monk (born 1998), American basketball player
- Malik Montana (born 1989), German-Polish rapper
- Malik Mothersille (born 2003), British-Jamaican footballer
- Malik Muhammad (born 2004), American football player
- Malik Ghulam Muhammad (1895–1956), Pakistani politician and economist
- Malik Lal Muhammad, Pakistani politician
- Malik Müller (born 1994), German basketball player
- Malik ibn al-Murahhal (1207–1299), Berber poet
- Malik Umar Farooq Mushtaq, Pakistani politician
- Malik Mustapha (born 2002), American football player
- Malik Nabers (born 2003), American football player
- Malik Ghulam Nabi (1911–2009), Pakistani politician
- Malik ibn al-Nadr (180–??), ancestor of the Islamic prophet Muḥammad
- Malik Al Nasir (born 1966), British author and spoken word poet
- Malik Muhammad Nawaz (born 1964), Pakistani politician
- Malik Nejer (born 1985), Saudi animator, writer, voice actor, and director
- Malik Newman (born 1997), American basketball player
- Malik ibn Nuwayra (died 632), Arab tribal chief
- Malik Obama (born 1958), Kenyan–American businessman
- Malik Osborne (born 1998), American basketball player
- Malik Oskenbay (born 1966), Kazakh artist and sculptor
- Malik Owolabi-Belewu (born 2002), English footballer
- Malik Peiris (born 1949), Hong Kong-based Sri Lankan virologist
- Malik Pimpong (born 2008), Danish footballer
- Malik Pinto (born 2002), American footballer
- Malik Pope (born 1996), American basketball player
- Malik St. Prix (born 1995), Saint Lucian footballer
- Malik Asghar Ali Qaisar (born 1965), Pakistani politician
- Malik Qambar (1888–1969), Catholic-Assyrian national leader and general
- Malik Qayumov (1911–2010), Soviet-Uzbek filmmaker and actor
- Malik Mohammad Qayyum (1944–2023), Pakistani lawyer
- Malik Mazhar Abbas Raan (1953–2019), Pakistani politician
- Malik Wasif Mazhar Raan, Pakistani politician
- Malik Rahim (born 1947), American housing and prison activist
- Malik Raiah (born 1992), Algerian footballer
- Malik Ram (1906–1993), Indian scholar
- Malik Reaves (born 1995), American football player
- Malik Reed (born 1996), American football player
- Malik Abbas Rehman, Pakistani politician
- Malik Kifayatur Rehman, Pakistani politician
- Malik Reneau (born 2003), American basketball player
- Malik Riaz (born 1954), Pakistani businessman and real estate developer
- Malik Risaldi (born 1996), Indonesian footballer
- Malik Rose (born 1974), American basketball player
- Malik Rosier (born 1995), American football player
- Malik Rouag (born 1983), French footballer
- Malik Saad (1959–2007), Pakistani police officer
- Malik Saidullaev (born 1964), Russian businessman
- Malik Sajad, Indian graphic novelist
- Malik Badshah Saleh, Pakistani politician
- Malik Samarawickrama (born 1949), Sri Lankan entrepreneur and politician
- Malik Samartaney (born 1953), American serial killer
- Malik Ghulam Rasool Sangha, Pakistani politician
- Malik Sarwar (died 1399), Sultan of Jaunpur
- Malik Sawadogo (born 2003), Swiss footballer
- Malik Hassan Sayeed (born 1969), American cinematographer, producer, and director
- Malik Scott (born 1980), American boxing trainer and boxer
- Malik Sealy (1970–2000), American basketball player
- Malik Sekou (born 1964), American academic
- Malik Sellouki (born 2000), French footballer
- Malik Zulu Shabazz (born 1966), American attorney
- Malik Shah (disambiguation), several Seljuk sultans
- Malik Naseer Ahmed Shahwani, Pakistani politician
- Malik-us-Sharq, Governor of Mahim
- Malik ul Ashtar Shujauddin (born 1948), Ismaili Islamic cleric
- Malik Skupin-Alfa (born 2004), German sprinter and middle-distance runner
- Malik Stanley (born 1997), American football player
- Malik Sulaiman (born 1968), Malaysian yachtsman and Naval officer
- Malik Sadr al-Din Tabrizi (died 1269/70), Iranian statesman
- Malik Anwar Taj, Pakistani politician
- Malik ibn Tawk (died 873), Abbasid official
- Malik Taylor (born 1995), American football player
- Malik Tchokounté (born 1988), French footballer
- Malik Thomas (born 2002), American basketball player
- Malik Maqbul Tilangani (died 1369), Indian commander
- Malik Tillman (born 2002), German footballer
- Malik Ehsan Ullah Tiwana, Pakistani politician
- Malik Fateh Khan Tiwana (died 1848), Punjabi landowner, Sardar of Mitha Tiwana State, and politician
- Malik Khuda Buksh Tiwana, Pakistani politician
- Malik Munir Khan Tiwana (1894–??), Pakistani Army officer
- Malik Sahib Khan Tiwana (died 1879), Punjabi Rajput landowner
- Malik Turner (American football) (born 1996), American football player
- Malik Turner (rapper), American rapper and producer
- Malik Verdon (born 2002), American football player
- Malik Muhammad Waheed (born 1972), Pakistani politician
- Malik Nawab Sher Waseer (born 1945), Pakistani politician
- Malik Washington (born 2001), American football player
- Malik Washington (quarterback) (born 2006), American college football player
- Malik Williams (born 1998), American basketball player
- Malik Willis (born 1999), American football player
- Malik Al-Hassan Yakubu (born 1945), Ghanaian lawyer and Politician
- Malik Yaqo (1894–1974), Assyrian tribal leader
- Malik Yoba (born 1967), American actor and singer
- Malik Yusef (born 1971), American spoken word poet, rapper, writer, actor, and producer
- Malik Ikhtiyaruddin Yuzbak, Indian monarch
- Malik Zaire (born 1995), American media personality and college football player
- Malik Zidi (born 1975), French film, television, and theatre actor
- Malik Zinad (born 1993), Libyan boxer
- Malik Zorgane (born 1965), Algerian football manager and a player

=== Maliq ===
- Maliq Brown (born 2003), American basketball player
- Maliq Bushati (1890–1946), Albanian politician
- Maliq Cadogan (born 2004), Guyanese-British footballer
- Maliq Pasha Gjinolli (1760–1824), Ottoman Albanian Pasha
- Maliq Johnson (born 2000), American actor

=== Malique ===
- Malique Lewis (born 2004), Trinidadian basketball player
- Malique Smith-Band (born 2004), British sprinter
- Malique Thompson-Dwyer (born 1998), English actor
- Malique Williams (born 1988), Antiguan swimmer

=== Mallick ===
- Mallick Faqrul Islam, Bangladeshi police officer

=== Mallik ===
- Mallik Ram, Indian film director and writer
- Mallik Wilks (born 1998), English footballer

=== Malyk ===
- Malyk Hamilton (born 1999), Canadian footballer

== Fictional characters ==
- Malek the Paladin, a fictional character from the video game series Legacy of Kain
- Malik, a fictional character from the Malaysian film series KL Gangster
- Malik, a character from Work It Out Wombats!
- Malik Al-Sayf, a character from the video game series Assassin's Creed
- Malik Caesar, a fictional character in the 2009 video game Tales of Graces
- Malik Cummings, a character from Legends of Chamberlain Heights
- Marik Ishtar, known as "Malik Ishtar" in Japanese, a character from Yu-Gi-Oh! Duel Monsters
- Malik Wright, a character from the American comedy-drama television series The Game (since 2006)
- Faridah Malik, a fictional character from the 2011 video game Deus Ex: Human Revolution
- Jack Malik, the protagonist in the 2019 movie Yesterday
- Meera Malik, a character from the 2013 TV series The Blacklist
- Sally Malik, a fictional character in the television series Being Human
- Gideon, Nathaniel, and Freddy Malick, characters in the Marvel television series Agents of S.H.I.E.L.D.
- Sarita Malik, a character from the 2009 TV series V

== See also ==
- Maalik (disambiguation)
