= Tatars of Kazakhstan =

Minority ethnic group in Kazakhstan

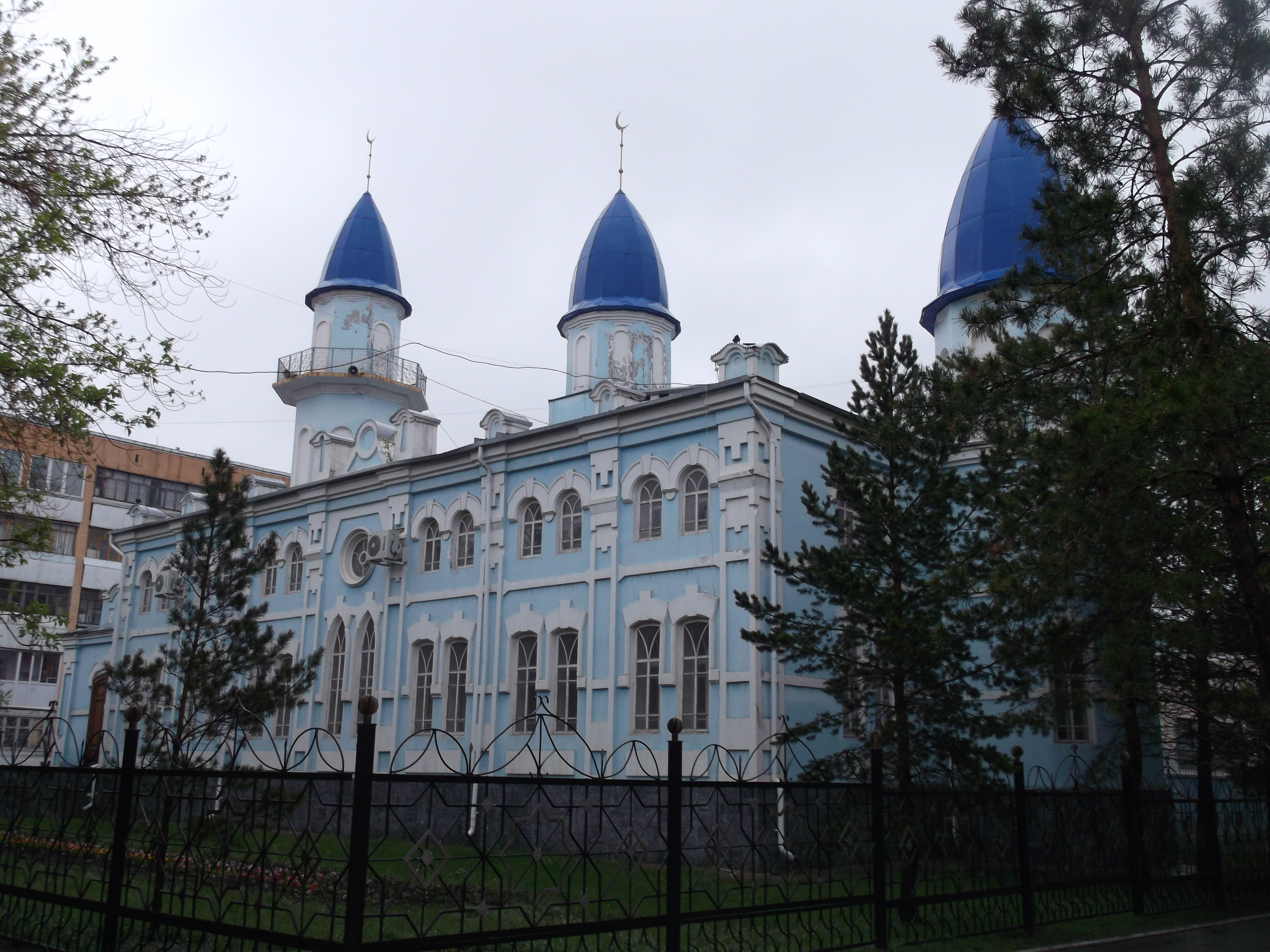
Maral Ishan Mosque in Kostanay, built by the local Tatar community in 1893

The Volga Tatars of Kazakhstan or Tatar Kazakhstanis (Kazakh: Қазақстандағы татарлар, romanized: Qazaqstandağy tatarlar) are a minority in Kazakhstan, and make up 1.1% of the population. There are 218,361 Volga Tatars living in Kazakhstan according to 2026 estimate. (see Demographics of Kazakhstan).

== History ==
Volga Tatars have penetrated the area that is today Kazakhstan from the nineteenth century, entering the region as traders offering manufactured goods to nomadic Kazakhs. They were also Islamic missionaries, and Tatar settlers were the conduit of Islam into the region.

Volga Tatars became well assimilated in Kazakhstani society. During the Soviet period many Tatars occupied positions in the medium-level administration and they comprised a significant part of the Kazakhstani intelligentsia.

Now each Kazakhstan oblast has its own Tatar cultural centre, dedicated to preserve ethnic identity. According to 2009 national census 79.5% of Tatar Kazakhstanis identify as Muslims, and 10.2% as Christians and 8.1% as Atheists.
