= Umer Tanveer =

Pakistani politician

Member of the Provincial Assembly of the Punjab
- In office 15 August 2018 – 14 January 2023
- Constituency: PP-15 (Rawalpindi-X)

Personal details
- Born: 6 March 1982 (age 44) Lalamusa, Punjab, Pakistan
- Other political affiliations: PTI (2013-2023)
- Education: Bahria University (MBA); University of the Punjab (LLB)
- Profession: Politician, lawyer

Umer Tanveer Butt (Urdu: عمر تنویر بٹ) is a Pakistani politician who had been a member of the Provincial Assembly of the Punjab from August 2018 till January 2023.

== Political career ==
He ran for the Provincial Assembly of the Punjab as a candidate of the Pakistan Tehreek-e-Insaf (PTI) from PP-10 Rawalpindi-X in the 2013 Punjab provincial election, but was unsuccessful. He received 36,521 votes and was defeated by Malik Iftikhar Ahmed, a candidate of the Pakistan Muslim League (N) (PML(N)).

He was elected to the Provincial Assembly of the Punjab as a candidate of the PTI from PP-15 Rawalpindi-X in the 2018 Punjab provincial election. He received 38,429 votes and defeated Malik Iftikhar Ahmed, a candidate of the PML(N).
