= Malik Turner =

Malik Turner may refer to:

- Malik Turner (American football) (born 1996), American football player
- Malik Turner (rapper), American rapper and producer
