= Syed Fazal Agha =

Pakistani politician (1946–2020)

Syed Muhammad Fazal Agha

4th Deputy Chairman of the Senate of Pakistan
- In office 21 March 1988 – 20 March 1991
- Chairman: Wasim Sajjad
- Preceded by: Malik Ali Khan
- Succeeded by: Noor Jehan Panezai

15th Governor of Balochistan
- In office 18 August 1999 – 12 October 1999
- Chief Minister: Jan Mohammad Jamali
- Preceded by: Miangul Aurangzeb
- Succeeded by: Amir-ul-Mulk Mengal

Member of the Provincial Assembly of Balochistan
- In office 13 August 2018 – 20 May 2020

Personal details
- Born: 1946 Huramzai, Baluchistan Agency, British India (present-day Balochistan, Pakistan)
- Died: 20 May 2020 Karachi, Pakistan
- Party: Jamiat Ulema-e Islam (F)
- Education: University of Peshawar (B.E. Civil Engineering) University of Balochistan (LL.B.)

Syed Muhammad Fazal Agha (Urdu: سید محمد فضل آغا) (1946 – 20 May 2020) was a Pakistani politician from Pishin District of Balochistan province of Pakistan who served as Governor of Balochistan from 18 August 1999 to 12 October 1999. He also served as Deputy Chairman of the Senate of Pakistan from 1988-1991 from Balochistan. He was a member of the Provincial Assembly of Balochistan from 13 August 2018 till his death on 20 May 2020.

== Life ==
Syed Fazal Agha was born in Killi Huramzai, Pishin District. He had political affiliation with Jamiat Ulema-e-Islam (F). He participated in the 2008 election and 2013 elections but did not succeed. He was successful in the 2018 elections and was elected as member of Provincial Assembly of Balochistan for PB-20 (Pishin-III). He died on 20 May 2020 after contracting COVID-19 during the COVID-19 pandemic in Pakistan.

== See also ==
- Governor of Baluchistan
