= Mbye =

Mbye is a surname of Gambian origin. Notable people with the surname include:

- Mohammed Mbye, (born 1989), Swedish-Gambian football player
- Moses Mbye (born 1993), Australian Rugby League player of Gambian descent

== See also ==
- Mbaye
