= PP-14 Rawalpindi-VIII =

Constituency of the Provincial Assembly of Punjab, Pakistan

- Constituency for the Provincial Assembly of Punjab
- Region: Rawalpindi Cantonment (partly) of Rawalpindi District

Current constituency
- Created from: PP-10 Rawalpindi-X (2002-2018); PP-15 Rawalpindi-X (2018-2023)

PP-14 Rawalpindi-VIII (پی پی-14، راولپنڈى-8) is a Constituency of Provincial Assembly of Punjab.

== 2008—2013: PP-10 Rawalpindi-X ==
Provincial election 2008: PP-10 Rawalpindi-X
Party	Candidate	Votes	%	±%
PML(N)	Malik Abrar Ahmad	35,532	59.72	
PPP	Ch. Masood Akhtar Advocate	15,380	25.85	
PML(Q)	Raja Faisal Iqbal Advocate	7,276	12.23	
MMA	Muhammad Zia Ur Rehman Amazai	452	0.76	
Jamiat Ulema-e-Pakistan	Babar Ijaz	355	0.60	
ANP	Major (R) Mahr Muhammad Ramzan	327	0.55	
PST	Allama Yasir Naseer	110	0.18	
Independent	Shazia Nasim Malik	32	0.05	
Independent	Ch. Abdul Wadood Ghazi	29	0.05	
Turnout		60,148	39.41	
Total valid votes		59,493	98.91	
Rejected ballots		655	1.09	
Majority		20,152	33.87	
Registered electors		152,607		

== 2013—2018: PP-10 Rawalpindi-X ==
General elections were held on 11 May 2013. Malik Iftikhar Ahmad won this seat with 42539 votes.

Provincial election 2013 : PP-10 Rawalpindi-X
Party	Candidate	Votes	%	±%
PML(N)	Malik Iftikhar Ahmed	42,539	44.34	
PTI	Umer Tanveer	36,521	38.07	
PML(Q)	Malik Mehboob Ellahi	9,912	10.33	
JI	Abdul Jalil	2,841	2.96	
PST	Malik Abdur Rauf	1,646	1.72	
Others	Others (thirteen candidates)	2,472	2.58	
Turnout		97,006	55.36	
Total valid votes		95,931	98.89	
Rejected ballots		1,075	1.11	
Majority		6,018	6.27	
Registered electors		175,237		

== 2018—2023 PP-15 Rawalpindi-X ==
From 2018 PP-10 Rawalpindi-X Became PP-15 Rawalpindi-X With Some changes has follow (a) The following Census Charges of Rawalpindi Cantonment (1) Charge No.1 (2) Charge No.2 (3) Charge No.3 Circle No. 1, 2 and 3 (4) Charge No.7 and (5) Charge No.8 of Rawalpindi District.

Provincial election 2018: PP-15 Rawalpindi-X
Party	Candidate	Votes	%	±%
PTI	Umer Tanveer	38,584	54.05	
PML(N)	Malik Iftikhar Anmed	22,316	31.26	
TLP	Tahir Mehmood	4,087	5.73	
PPP	Muhammad Javaid Iqbal Malik	1,887	2.64	
MMA	Khalid Mahmood Alvi	1,611	2.26	
Independent	Shabbir Hussain	1,180	1.65	
AAT	Malik Shehzad Yasin	1,072	1.50	
Others	Others (three candidates)	656	0.93	
Turnout		72,942	52.11	
Total valid votes		71,393	97.88	
Rejected ballots		1,549	2.12	
Majority		16,268	22.79	
Registered electors		139,969		

== General elections 2024 ==
Provincial election 2024: PP-14 Rawalpindi-VIII
Party	Candidate	Votes	%	±%
PML(N)	Malik Iftikhar Ahmad	39,558	43.83	
Independent	Nasir Ali Khan (Note: Filed nomination papers as PTI candidate but ECP allowed him to run as an Independent)	33,258	36.85	
TLP	Taimur Waheed Malik	4,400	4.88	
Independent	Muhammad Usman Khan	3,530	3.91	
PPP	Malik Muhammad Qasim	2,576	2.85	
JI	Hafiz Khizer Hayat	2,460	2.73	
Others	Others (twenty three candidates)	4,475	4.95	
Turnout		91,636	56.42	
Total valid votes		90,257	98.50	
Rejected ballots		1,379	1.50	
Majority		6,300	6.98	
Registered electors		162,419		
hold				

== See also ==
- PP-13 Rawalpindi-VII
- PP-15 Rawalpindi-IX
