= PP-13 Rawalpindi-VII =

Constituency of the Provincial Assembly of Punjab, Pakistan

- Constituency for the Provincial Assembly of Punjab
- Region: Wah Cantonment area of Taxila Tehsil of Rawalpindi District

Current constituency
- Created from: PP-8 Rawalpindi-VIII (2002-2018); PP-20 Rawalpindi-XV (2018-2023)

PP-13 Rawalpindi-VII (پی پی-13، راولپنڈى-7) is a Constituency of Provincial Assembly of Punjab.

== 2008—2013: PP-8 Rawalpindi-VIII ==
General elections were held on 18 February 2008. Mrs. Umar Farooq won this seat with 30678 votes.

Provincial election 2008: PP-8 Rawalpindi-VIII
Party	Candidate	Votes	%	±%
PML(N)	Mrs. Umar Farooq	30,678	37.74	
PPP	Aamir Iqbal Khan	29,763	36.61	
PML(Q)	Malik Taimoor Masood Akbar	19,014	23.39	
MQM-P	Kashif Ali Khan	1,029	1.27	
Independent	Prof. Akhtar Abbass Awan	654	0.80	
Independent	Amjad Hussain Shah	149	0.18	
Turnout		83,008	47.12	
Total valid votes		81,287	97.93	
Rejected ballots		1,721	2.07	
Majority		915	1.13	
Registered electors		176,165		

== 2013-2018:PP-8 Rawalpindi-VIII ==
General elections were held on 11 May 2013. Malik Taimoor Masood won this seat with 49,876 votes.

Provincial election 2013: PP-8 Rawalpindi-VIII
Party	Candidate	Votes	%	±%
PTI	Malik Taimoor Masood	49,876	41.45	
PML(N)	Malik Umer Farooq	40,442	33.61	
Independent	Faisal Iqbal	12,999	10.80	
PPP	Safir Khan	7,250	6.02	
JI	Muhammad Waqas Khan	4,717	3.92	
PST	Tariq Mehmood	2,005	1.67	
JUI (F)	Safeer Alam	1,333	1.11	
Others	Others (eight candidates)	1,717	1.42	
Turnout		120,339	58.61	
Total valid votes		120,339	100	
Rejected ballots		0	0	
Majority		9,434	7.84	
Registered electors		205,326		

== General elections 2018 ==
Provincial election 2018: PP-20 Rawalpindi-XV
Party	Candidate	Votes	%	±%
Independent	Malik Taimoor Masood	40,637	42.92	
Independent	Faisal Iqbal	26,163	27.64	
PML(N)	Raja Muhammad Sarfaraz Asghar	12,806	13.53	
TLP	Muhammad Aslam Khan	7,602	8.03	
MMA	Muhammad Waqas Khan	3,546	3.75	
PPP	Amir Iqbal	2,620	2.77	
Others	Others (six candidates)	1,297	1.36	
Turnout		96,476	54.02	
Total valid votes		94,671	98.13	
Rejected ballots		1,805	1.87	
Majority		14,474	15.28	
Registered electors		178,585		

== General elections 2024 ==
Provincial election 2024: PP-13 Rawalpindi-VII
Party	Candidate	Votes	%	±%
Independent	Malik Fahad Masood (Note: Filed nomination papers as PTI candidate but ECP allowed him to run as an Independent)	57,085	50.52	
PML(N)	Malik Umar Farooq	24,556	21.73	
TLP	Muhammad Aslam Khan	9,911	8.77	
JI	Muhammad Waqas Khan	4,787	4.24	
IPP	Malk Azmat Mahmood	3,696	3.27	
Independent	Muhammad Jamil	2,148	1.90	
PRHP	Abdul Hakeem Faroogi	2,062	1.83	
Others	Others (twenty one candidates)	8,749	7.74	
Turnout		115,713	47.48	
Total valid votes		112,991	97.65	
Rejected ballots		2,722	2.35	
Majority		32,529	28.79	
Registered electors		243,703		
hold				

== See also ==
- PP-12 Rawalpindi-VI
- PP-14 Rawalpindi-VIII
