= Malik Oskenbay =

Kazakh artist (born 1966)

- Мәлік Өскенбай Әуесханұлы
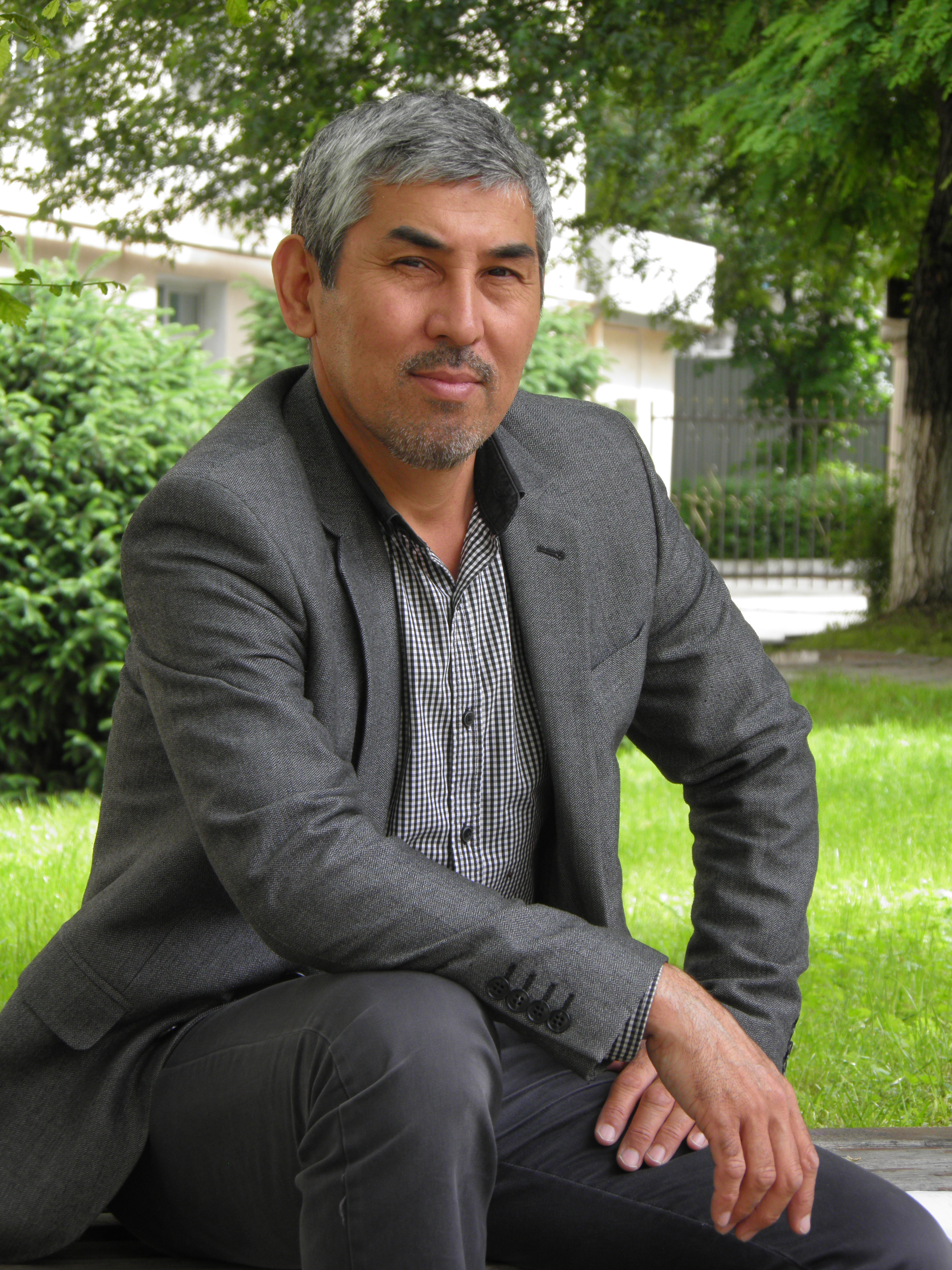
- Born: Malik Aueskhanuly Oskenbay; 22 February 1966; Panfilov, Taldykorgan, Kazakh SSR, Kazakhstan
- Citizenship: Kazakhstan
- Occupation: sculptor

Malik Aueskhanuly Oskenbay (Kazakh: Мәлік Әуесханұлы Өскенбай, Málik Áýeshanuly Óskenbaı; born February 22, 1966) is a Kazakh artist and sculptor. He serves as head of the commission subject-cyclic of the painting, sculpture and theater arts specialties in Almaty College of Decorative and Applied Arts, and a member of the Union of Artists of Kazakhstan.

He has written several articles and textbooks, including what is claimed to be the first human anatomy book in the Kazakh language. He also developed a sculpture-training curriculum for art colleges, approved by the Ministry of Education and Science of the Republic of Kazakhstan.

In recognition of his contributions to children's education, he received the Y.Altynsarin badge from the Ministry of Education and Science of the Republic of Kazakhstan.

== Biography ==
Malik Oskenbay was born on 22 February 1966 in Panfilov, Taldykorgan Region (now Zharkent, Almaty Region), and later moved with his family to Almaty. He completed his first education at School No. 115 in Almaty in 1981, after which he studied at the Almaty Art School named after N. V. Gogol for high education, graduating in 1985.

From 1985 to 1987, Oskenbay served in the Soviet Army in the Komi ASSR. Following his military service, he continued his studies at the Almaty State Theater and Art Institute named after T. Zhurgenov (now the Kazakh National Academy of Arts), where he specialized in sculpture and graduated in 1992.

In 1992, he began teaching specialized subjects at the Almaty College of Decorative and Applied Arts named after U. Tansykbayev. Between 1993 and 2005, he also taught anatomy, sculpture, and painting at the Kazakh National Academy of Arts. From 2001 to 2005, he completed postgraduate studies at the Academy.

Since 2005, Oskenbay has served as head of the Department of Painting, Sculpture, and Decorative Theater Arts at the Almaty College of Decorative and Applied Arts.

== Awards ==
In 2019, Oskenbay received the gold medal named after Abilkhan Kasteev for Best Creativity of the Year in the sculpture category at the annual exhibition of artists of Kazakhstan, organized by the Union of Artists of Kazakhstan (KRSO).

On 10 May 2017, he was awarded the breastplate Excellence in Culture by the Ministry of Culture and Sports of the Republic of Kazakhstan (No. 246-к).

Earlier, on 16 September 2008, he was honored with the Y. Altynsarin badge from the Ministry of Education and Science of the Republic of Kazakhstan in recognition of his contribution to the education and upbringing of the younger generation.

He has also received a letter of appreciation from the Ministry of Education and Science.

== Exhibitions ==
2025 – Plastic Exploration (Пластикалық ізденіс)

A solo exhibition featuring 37 sculptures and about 40 graphic works by Oskenbay. The artist turns to themes of nature and human emotion, blending traditional and contemporary styles.

2023 – Milestone (Белес)

A solo exhibition titled BELES, dedicated to the 85th anniversary of the Ural Tansykbayev Almaty College of Decorative and Applied Arts and the 90th anniversary of the Union of Artists of the Republic of Kazakhstan.

The sculptor explores the essence of the Kazakh identity, skillfully combining realistic and abstract approaches while employing materials such as stone, wood, bronze, and clay to find expressive plastic solutions. The exhibition presents about 30 sculptures and 41 graphic works.

2019 – Annual Report Exhibition of Artists of Kazakhstan

2018 – Exhibition dedicated to the 85th anniversary of the Union of Artists of the Republic of Kazakhstan

2017 – Solo creative exhibition Plastic Search, dedicated to the 25th anniversary of Independence of the Republic of Kazakhstan

2016 – Round table dedicated to the author's personal art exhibition Plastic Search

2016 – Exhibition dedicated to the 25th anniversary of Independence of the Republic of Kazakhstan organized by the Republican Union of Artists of Kazakhstan

2015 – Exhibition dedicated to the 550th anniversary of the Kazakh Khanate, organized by the Republican Union of Artists of Kazakhstan

2014 – National Museum of the Republic of Kazakhstan "National Traditions and Openness to the World". At the bottom of the Sea, sculpture, black granite, 30x13x11.

2013 – An exhibition dedicated to the 80th anniversary of the Union of Artists of the Republic of Kazakhstan. December severe cold, sculpture, marble, granite.

2013 – "Sculptural monumental or decorative art": Freedom, sculpture, bronze, granite.

2013 – "Golden Cradle of Kazakh Fine Arts". Collection of exhibitions dedicated to the 75th anniversary of Almaty College of Decorative and Applied Arts named after U. Tansykbayev. p. 173. Melody, sculpture, granite; Ambition, sculpture, granite.

2012 – "Almaty College of Decorative and Applied Arts named after Ural Tansykbayev". p. 64. Khan, sculpture, wood; Nomadic, sculpture, bronze, granite; Student Girl, sculpture, bronze, granite (p. 46).

2010 – "Almaty College of Decorative and Applied Arts named after Ural Tansykbayev". "Sacrifice", sculpture, granite; Shaman, sculpture, bronze, granite.

2009 – "Exhibition of teachers of the Almaty College of Decorative and Applied Arts named after Ural Tansykbayev". 43 p. Baksy, sculpture, bronze, granite; Meditation, sculpture, bronze, granite.

2009 – Republic exhibition "... today, tomorrow...". Saka Daughter, sculpture, bronze, granite; Shaman, sculpture, bronze, granite.

1999 – "Art of Kazakhstan for centuries". "Sitting girl", sculpture, granite; size: 20x30x13

2007 – "Reporting Exhibition of the Union of National Artists"

2005 – Exhibition-competition "My Kazakhstan" devoted to the 100th anniversary of the People's Artist Abylkhan Kasteev: creative sculpture "Ablai Khan", material: wood

2004 – the republican exhibition "Zhas Daryn": sculpture "Syrlasu"; material: granite, stone, wood

2000 – International Youth Festival Exhibition: "Mother's Kindness"; material: burnt ceramic

2001 – the International Festival "Tulips and Man" was held: "Girl with tulips" graphics

1999 – the International Youth Festival, the exhibition "Sitting Hero"; material: terracotta

1998 – there was a personal exhibition "Cultural Center in Turkey", sculptures: "The Great Steppe Miss", material: tree, "Echo", material: wood, "Baluan", material: tree, "December", material: wood, "Lovers", material: stone

1997 – the international youth festival "Zhiger", "Sagynysh", material: wood

1996 – International exhibition "Kisen ashgan", "December", material: relief wood sculpture

1995 – Art Eurasia international exhibition Victims of repression, material: wood

== Projects ==
One Creation

This video is part of the independent cultural TV program Abai TV, dedicated to presenting the lives and works of Kazakh artists and sculptors. The featured episode tells the story of Oskenbay, highlighting his biography, creative path, and artistic contributions that have been presented at international exhibitions and received high recognition.

Through Oskenbay’s journey, the episode emphasizes the enduring value of Kazakh art and its influence on both national and global culture.

== Scientific works ==
=== Books ===
2020 – Sketches are the basis of fine arts.

2018 – The manifestation of a Man's head Image.

2006 – Plastic anatomy.

2005 – Co-author of 1 volume of the book, Chronicle of Kazakhs and Its Kings and Khans.

=== Articles ===
2016 – "Fine arts, music and drawing" at the school, Republican scientific-methodical magazine No. 5-6. An article titled "Creating a drawing technique." Pgs. 30-32.

2014 – "The Legend of Man" magazine No. 15 (99) August 2014. Publication interview "The genius artist (1452-1519) Leonardo da Vinci, the pride of humanity".

2005 – The author of a set of typical curriculums in the disciplines of sculpture, composition, skill, is devoted to sculpture department, excluded in the Kazakh and Russian languages from the printing house;

2005 – The author of the Model Study Program on the subject "Plastic anatomy". Was excluded from the printing house in the Kazakh and Russian languages;

=== Conferences ===
2012 – International Scientific and Practical Conference: "Continuous Art Education in the Republic of Kazakhstan: Decorative Applied Art - 2012", an article titled: "Features of the formation of the sculpture of ancient Kazakhstan" - 301-303 pages

2005 – International scientific-practical conference «Actual problems of art development in modern conditions of globalization», organized by KazNU named after Zhurgenov, theme of the article: «Ancientization of ancient Kazakhstani sculptural forms»;

2005 – International scientific-practical Conference dedicated to "The 100th anniversary of Oral Tansykbayev ", theme:" Volume and Spatial Analysis "," The Effect of Composition on the Composition and Sculpture ";

2005 – Anitov K., a student of the 2nd year student scientifically-practical conference, dedicated to the birthday of academician Ural Tansykbayev, held on May 25–26, under the title "The enlightened if you are a bearer". Head of the article "Sculpture of the First Society, Ancient East and Ancient Sculpture": Oskenbay M.A.;

2002 – International Scientific and Practical Conference "Culture-Art-Education: Trends and Prospects", organized by KazNMU named after Zhurgenov.

Year 2004. International scientific-practical conference "Cultural heritage and national education system of Kazakhstan people", organized by KazNMU named after Zhurgenov.

Year 2003. International scientific-practical conference "National model of education: methodology and modern technology of vocational training", organized by KazNU named after Zhurgenov.
