= Mbaye =

Mbaye is a Senegalese given name that is also used as a family name.

== Use as a given name ==
- Alioune Mbaye Nder (born 1969), Senegalese singer
- Annette Mbaye d'Erneville (born 1926), Senegalese writer
- Mbaye Diagne (died 1994), Senegalese Army officer
- Mbaye Dieye Faye, singer and percussionist from Senegal
- Mbaye Leye (born 1982), football striker from Senegal

== Use as a family name ==
- Abdoul Mbaye (born 1953), prime minister of Senegal
- Cheikh M'Baye (born 1995), Senegalese footballer
- Ibrahim Mbaye (born 2008), French-Senegalese footballer
- Ibrahima Mbaye (born 1994), Senegalese footballer
- Jimi Mbaye (1957–2025), Senegalese guitarist
- Kéba Mbaye (1924–2007), Senegalese judge
- Malick Mbaye (disambiguation), multiple people

== See also ==
- Mbay (disambiguation)
