= Mbay =

Mbay may refer to:

- Mbay (Indonesia), capital of Nagekeo Regency, Indonesia
- Mbay language, a Bongo–Bagirmi language of Chad and the Central African Republic
- Parfait Anicet Mbay, 2013 foreign minister of the Central African Republic

== See also ==
- Mbaye, a Senegalese given name and family name
