= Malik Shah =

Malik-Shah (Persian: ملكشاه), also transliterated as Malek-Shah, Malikshah or Melikshah, may refer to:

== People ==
- Malik-Shah I (1055–1092), sultan of Great Seljuq
- Malik-Shah II, sultan of Great Seljuq
- Malik-Shah III (1128–1160), sultan of Great Seljuq
- Malik Shah of Rum (died 1116), sultan of the Seljuq Sultanate of Rûm
