= Malik Fahad Masood =

Pakistani politician

Member of the Provincial Assembly of Punjab
- Incumbent
- Assumed office 24 February 2024

Personal details
- Party: PTI (2024-present)

Malik Fahad Masood is a Pakistani politician who has been a Member of the Provincial Assembly of the Punjab (MPAs) since 2024.

He was among over two dozen MPAs whose membership of the house was temporarily suspended, over behaviour that the Assembly Speaker ruled was meant to disrupt the house proceedings.

== Suspension ==
On 28 June 2025, Mehmood was among 26 members of the opposition who were suspended from the Punjab Assembly for 15 sittings. The action was taken by Speaker Malik Muhammad Ahmed Khan following a disruption during Chief Minister Maryam Nawaz's address. The suspended lawmakers were accused of disorderly conduct, including chanting slogans, tearing official documents, and surrounding the speaker’s dais. The speaker also forwarded references against the suspended members to the Election Commission of Pakistan for further action.

== Political career ==
He was elected to the Provincial Assembly of the Punjab as a Pakistan Tehreek-e-Insaf-backed independent candidate from Constituency PP-13 Rawalpindi-VII in the 2024 Pakistani general election. He secured 56,723 votes, defeating his opponent from PML-N, Malik Umar Farooq, by a substantial margin, as Farooq received 24,078 votes.
