= Malik ter Heerd =

Sint Maarten footballer

Personal information
- Date of birth: 12 January 2002 (age 24)
- Place of birth: Arnhem, Netherlands
- Positions: Striker; winger

Team information
- Current team: De Treffers

Youth career
- 2013–2017: VDZ
- 2017–2018: SML
- 2018–: De Treffers

International career^{‡}
Years	Team	Apps	(Gls)
2019–	Sint Maarten	2	(0)
- ‡ National team caps and goals as of 13:44, 8 July 2021 (UTC)

Malik ter Heerd (born 12 January 2002) is a Sint Maartener footballer who plays for De Treffers of the Dutch Tweede Divisie, and the Sint Maarten national team.

== Club career ==
Ter Heerd started his career with the youth sides of VDZ Arnhem in 2013 and remained with the club through 2016. He joined De Treffers of the Tweede Divisie for the 2018 season after a stint with SML.

== International career ==
Ter Heerd was named to Sint Maarten's squad for the 2015 CFU Boy's Under-15 Championship. Two years later he was part of the nation's squad again for the 2017 CONCACAF Boys' Under-15 Championship, held in Bradenton, Florida. The team won its opening match 1–0 against Dominica.

Ter Heerd was one of the four Netherlands-based players selected for Sint Maarten's squad for 2019–20 CONCACAF Nations League C matches in September 2019. He made his senior international debut on 10 October 2019 in a match against the Turks and Caicos Islands at age 17. Four days later he earned his second cap in the tournament, coming on as a substitute against Guadeloupe.

=== International career statistics ===
As of match played 14 October 2019.

Sint Maarten national team
Year	Apps	Goals
2019	2	0
Total	2	0
