= Malik Taimoor Masood =

Pakistani politician

Member of the Provincial Assembly of the Punjab
- In office 15 August 2018 – 14 January 2023
- Constituency: PP-20 Rawalpindi-XV
- In office 29 May 2013 – 31 May 2018
- Constituency: PP-8 (Rawalpindi-VIII)

President of PTI, North Punjab
- Incumbent
- Assumed office 3 May 2024
- Chairman: Gohar Ali Khan; Imran Khan
- Preceded by: Seemabia Tahir

Personal details
- Born: 21 September 1977 (age 49) Rawalpindi, Punjab, Pakistan
- Party: PTI (2013–present); PML-Q (2001–2012)

Malik Taimoor Masood (born 21 September 1977) is a Pakistani politician who had been a member of the Provincial Assembly of the Punjab from August 2018 till January 2023. Previously he was a member of the Punjab Assembly from May 2013 to May 2018.

== Early life and education ==
He was born on 21 September 1977 in Wah Cantonment.

He received his early education from Lawrence College, Ghora Gali. He graduated from University of the Punjab with a masters degree in Business Administration from COMSATS Institute of Information Technology.

== Political career ==
He contested his first election in Punjab provincial by-election 2002 by a vacant seat from Ghulam Sarwar Khan from the PP-8 (Rawalpindi-VIII) constituency as a PML-Q candidate but lost to Muhammad Waqas Khan of the Muttahida Majlis-e-Amal (MMA). He ran again in 2008 Punjab provincial election under the same party PML-Q but suffered a major defeat to Mrs. Umar Farooq of PML-N. In 2012, he subsequently joined PTI.

He was elected to the Provincial Assembly of the Punjab as a candidate of the Pakistan Tehreek-e-Insaf (PTI) from PP-8 (Rawalpindi-VIII) in the 2013 Punjab provincial election.

He was re-elected to Provincial Assembly of the Punjab as a candidate of the PTI from PP-20 Rawalpindi-XV in the 2018 Punjab provincial election.

He ran for a seat in the Provincial Assembly from PP-20 Rawalpindi-XV as a candidate of the PTI in the 2023 Punjab provincial election.
