= Kostanay =

City in Kostanay Region, Kazakhstan

Kostanay Qostanai (Kazakh)
- City
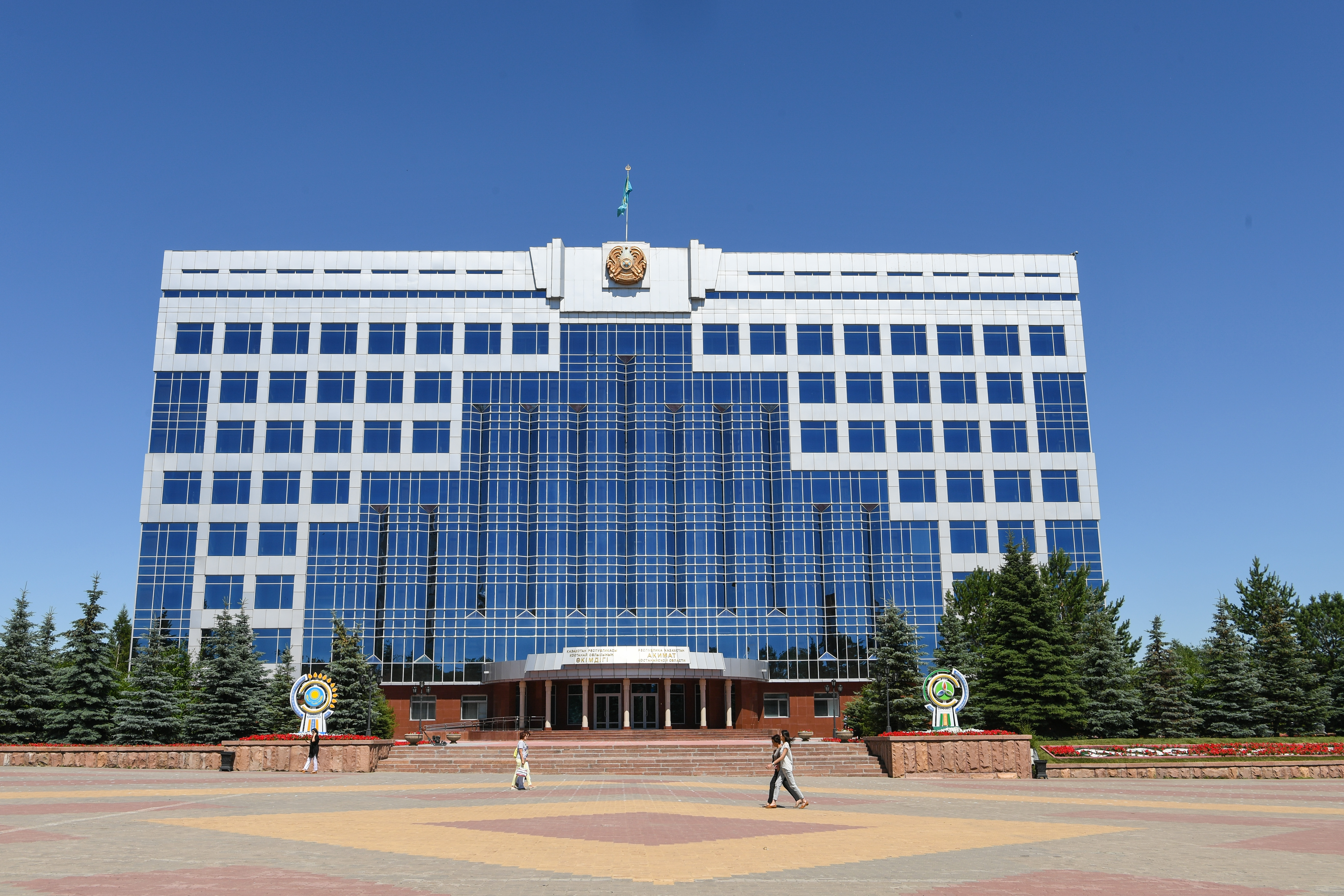
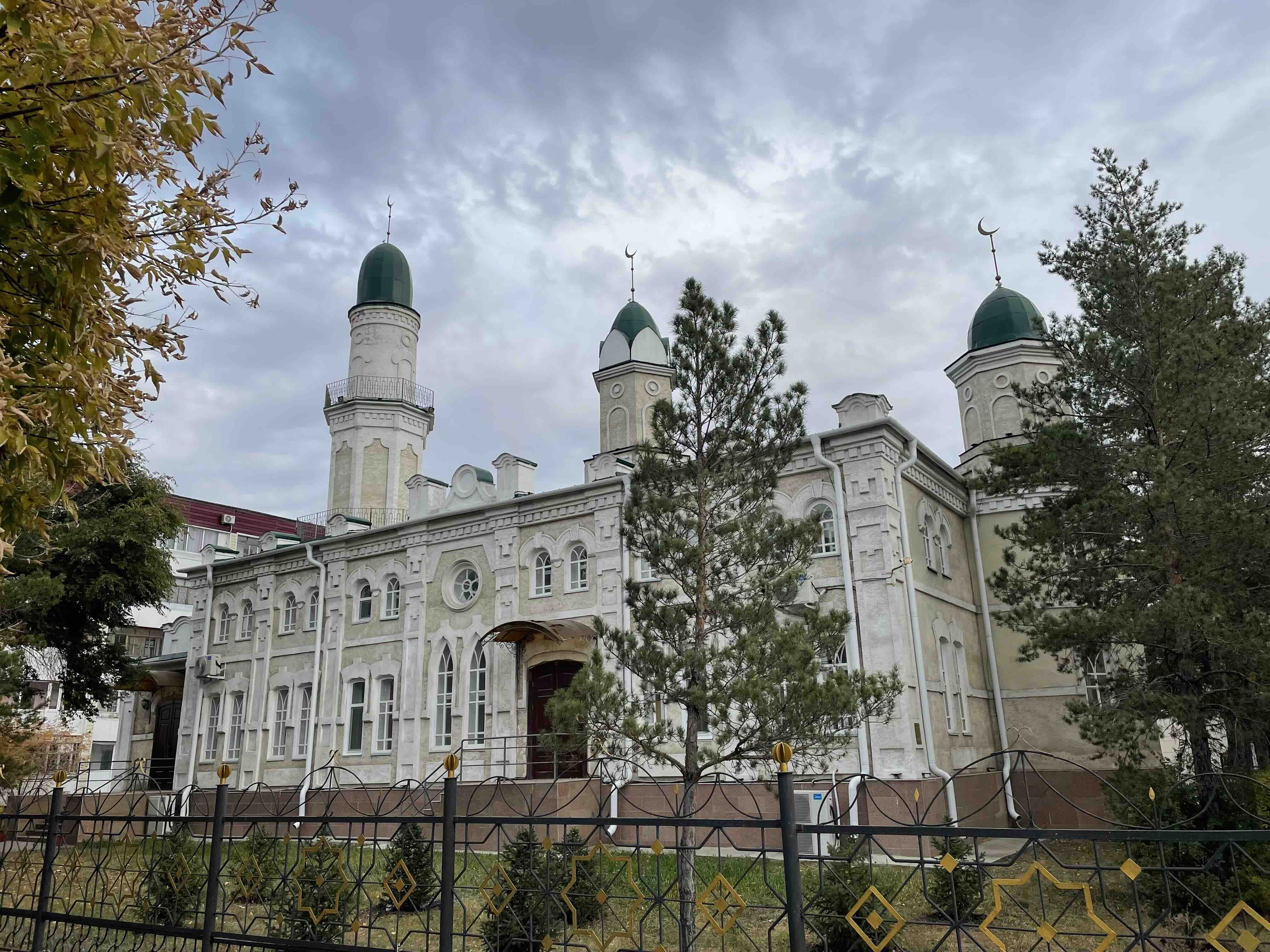
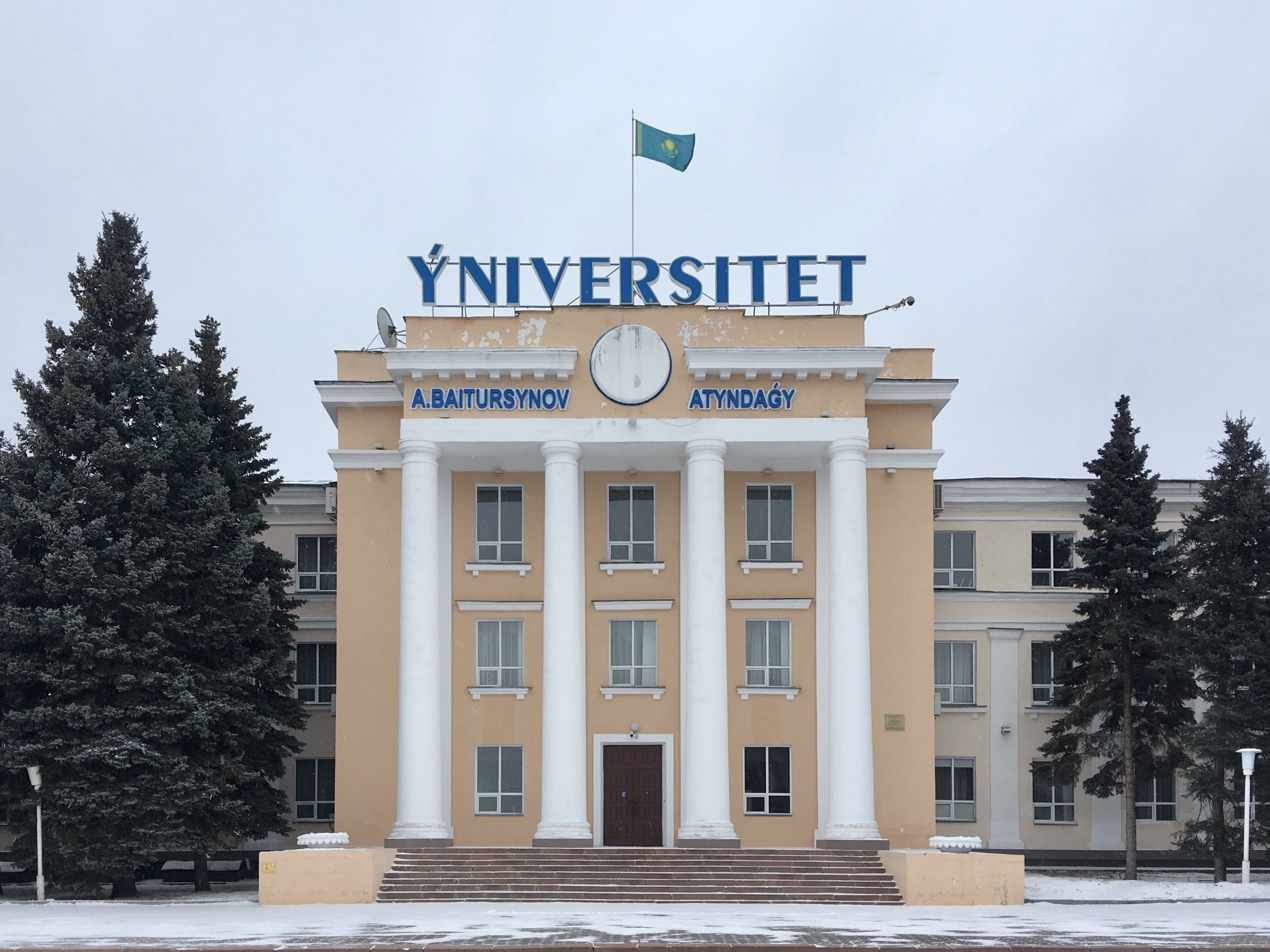
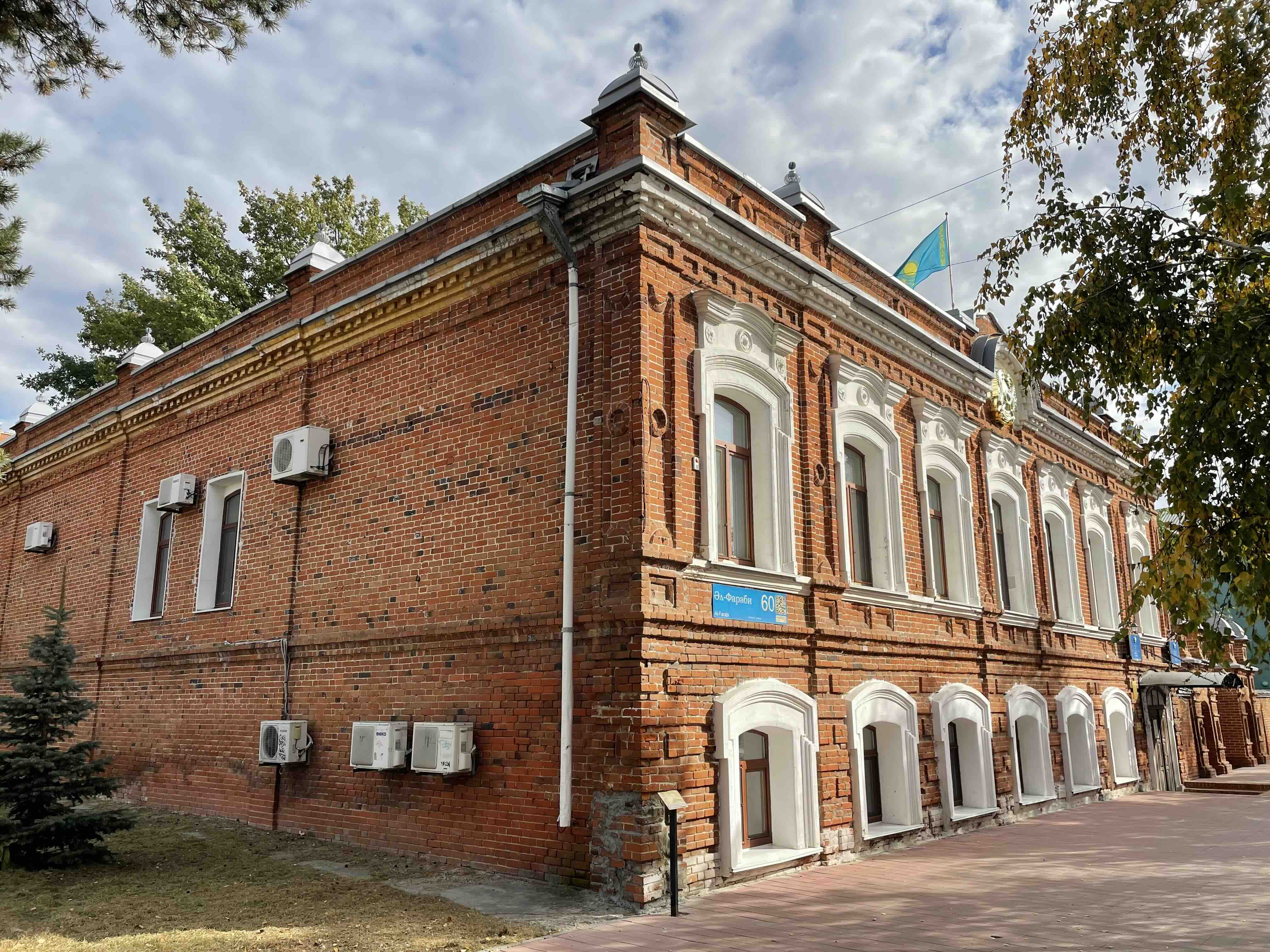
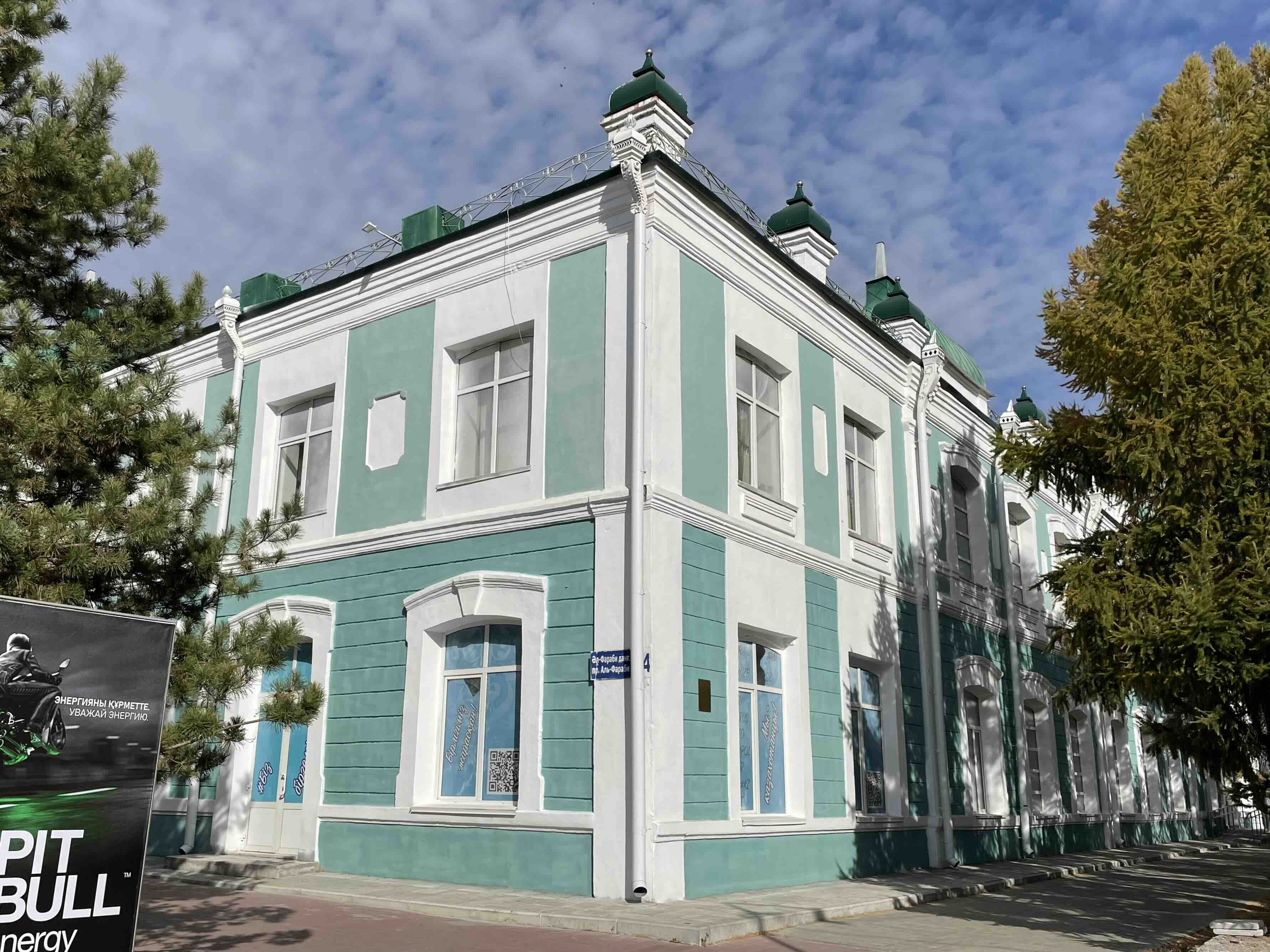
- Regional administration Maral Ishan Mosque Kostanay Regional University Department of Culture Historical museum

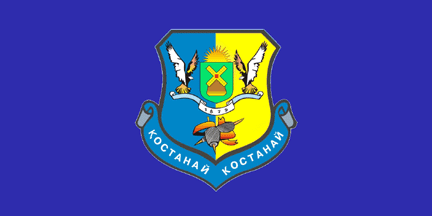
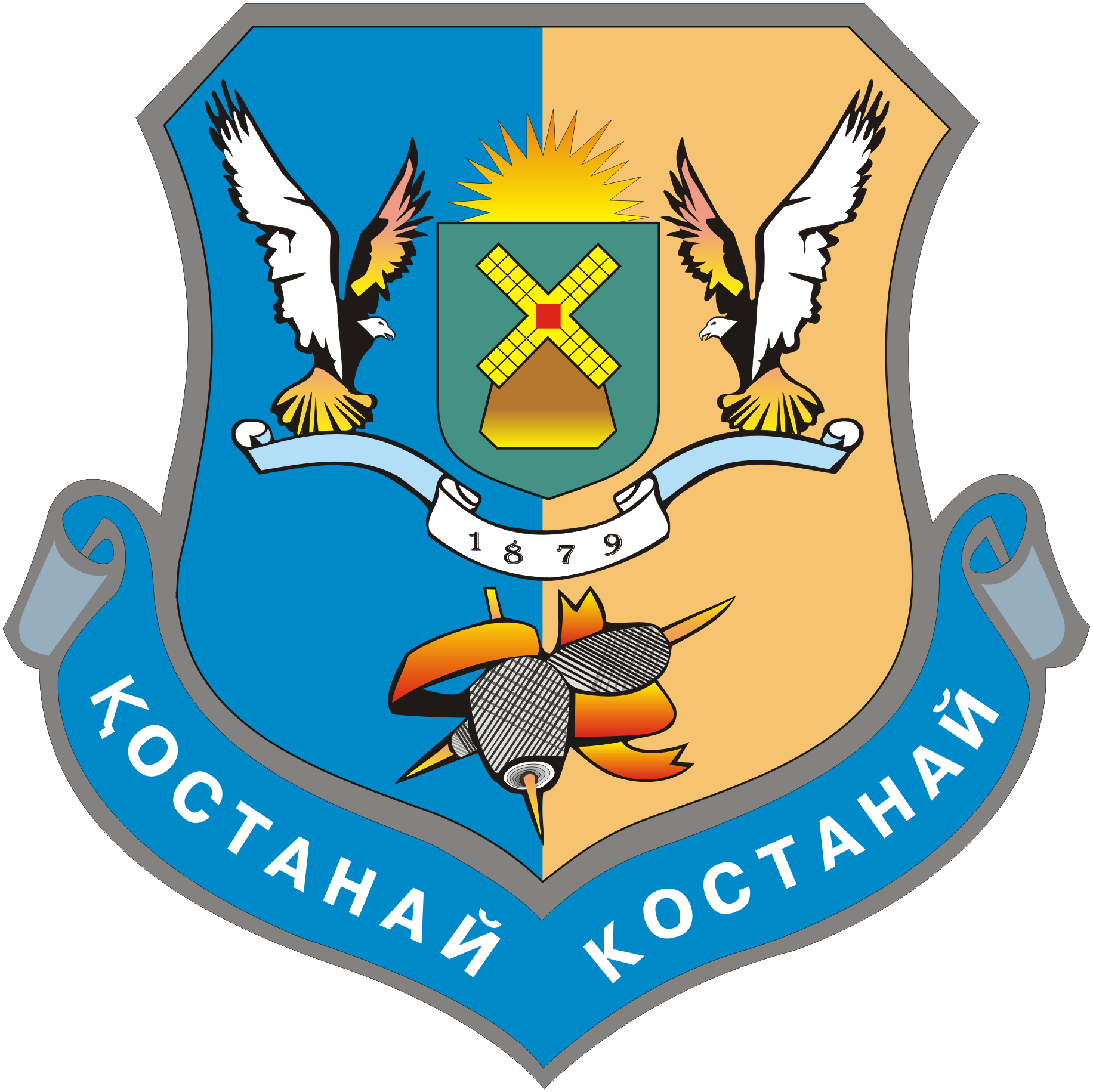
- Flag Seal

- Location in Kazakhstan
- Coordinates: 53.20°N 63.62°E
- Country: Kazakhstan
- Region: Kostanay Region
- Founded: 1879
- Incorporated (city): 1893

Government
  - Akim (mayor): Marat Zhundubaev

Area
  - Total: 240 km^{2} (93 sq mi)
- Highest elevation: 185 m (607 ft)
- Lowest elevation: 125 m (410 ft)

Population (1 April 2026)
  - Total: 277,757
  - Density: 1,200/km^{2} (3,000/sq mi)
- Time zone: UTC+5 (Asia/Qostanay)
- Postal code: 110000
- Area code: +7 7142
- Vehicle registration: P
- Website: gov.kz/memleket/entities/kostanai-kalasy-akimat

Kostanay (Note: Kazakh: Қостанай, romanized: Qostanai, pronounced [qʰostʰɑnɑ́j]; Russian: Костанай, romanized: Kostanaj, pronounced [kəstɐˈnaj]; English: /ˌkɒstəˈnaɪ/ KOST-ə-NY) is a city located on the Tobol River in northern Kazakhstan. It is the administrative center of the Kostanay Region. As of 24 March 2022, the city's governor is Marat Zhundubayev.

== History ==
The area formed part of the Kazakh Khanate, and was defended from raids of the Nogai Horde and Khanate of Sibir in the 15th and 16th centuries.

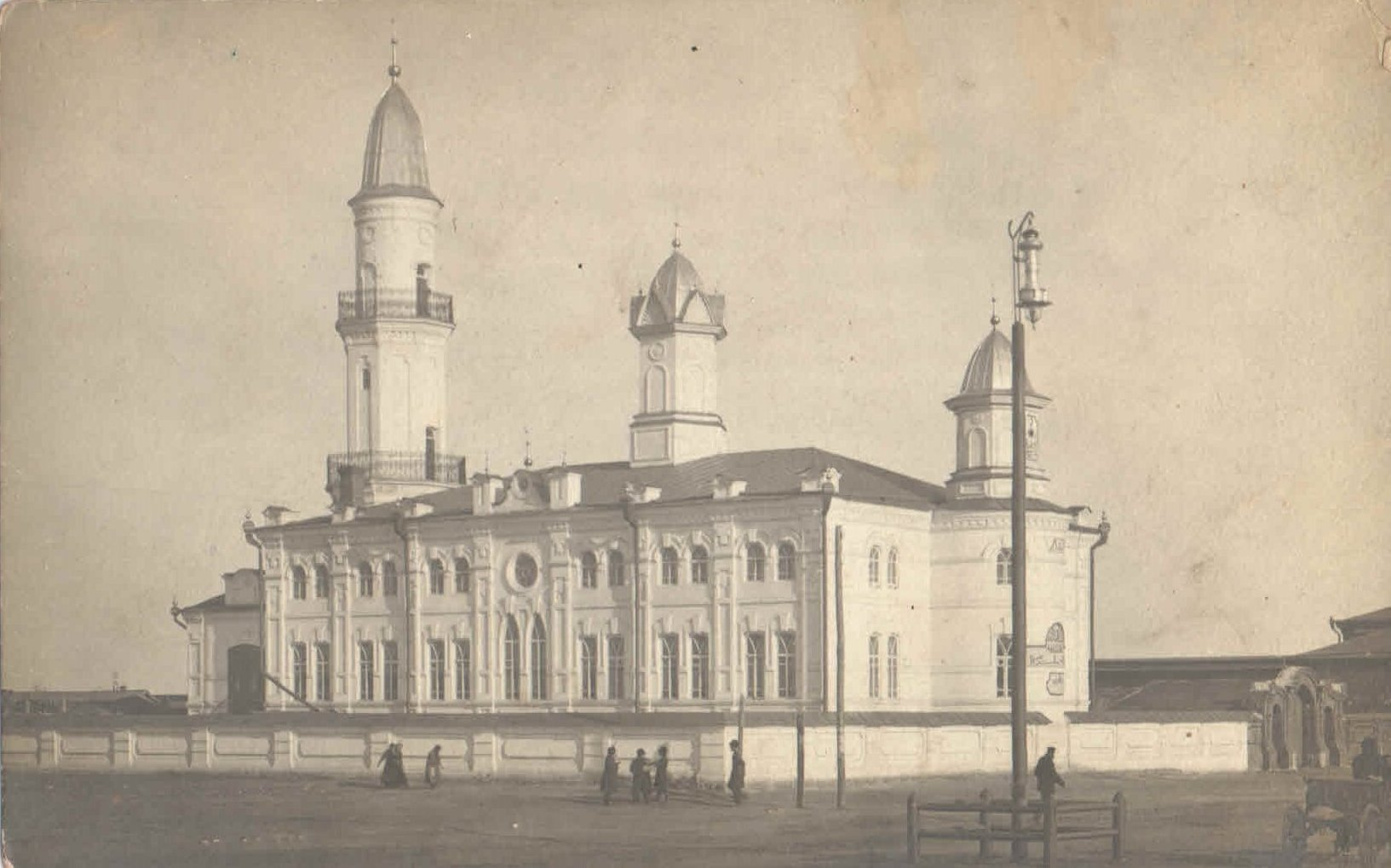
Maral Ishan Mosque in the early 20th century

Kostanay was founded by Russian settlers in 1879 and named Nikolaevsk, in honor of Tsar Nicholas II. In 1888, the town had more than 3,000 inhabitants involved in the building of a mill and a brewery, which are still operational. In 1893, Kustanay was granted city status.

In 1912–13, a southern branch of the Siberian Railway was built connecting Kostanay with Troitsk and Chelyabinsk, and the city established regular trade links with central Russia, and the local industry developed. The Red Army took control in 1918 and changed the city's name to Kustanay. A horse stud farm was established in the 1920s. In 1922, the Kazakh newspaper Auyl (Ауыл) began publishing. The Kustanay Region was established in 1936 with its administrative center in Kustanay. The Kostanay Regional State Archive and Kostanay Regional Philharmonic were founded in 1936 and 1944, respectively. During World War II, in connection with the formation of the Polish Anders' Army, a Polish diplomatic post was located in the city from January to July 1942.

Six years after the fall of Soviet Union, Kazakhstan renamed it to Kostanay. In 2009, the city population was 214,916 (2009 census results).

== Geographic location ==
The city is located in the steppe zone in the north of the Turgay plateau, in the south-eastern part of the West Siberian Plain, on the Tobol River, 571 km north-west of Astana city (704 km along the highway). The nearest city with at least a million inhabitants is Chelyabinsk in Russia, located 260 km north-west of Kostanay.

== Public institutions ==
In Kostanay, there are five institutions of higher education. There are also 22 high schools, which educate over 12,200 students. The state network of culture lists 381 libraries, 201 club establishments, 8 museums, and 2 theatres. Athletic facilities include 2 sports arenas, 26 stadiums, 10 sports complexes and 567 sports halls.

== Climate ==
Kostanay has a warm-summer humid continental climate (Köppen climate classification: Dfb), with very warm, dry summers and frigid, snowy winters. The average July temperature is 20.8 °C or 69.4 °F and that in January −14.9 °C or 5.2 °F, although sharp changes in temperature during the day are characteristic. Average wind speed is 3.2 metres per second (12 km/h; 7.2 mph; 6.2 kn), mainly from the south in winter and from the north in summer. Precipitation averages around 335 millimetres or 13.2 inches with a summer maximum. The average annual humidity is 71 percent and the growing season averages about 170 days.

Climate data for Kostanay (1991–2020, extremes 1902–present)
Month	Jan	Feb	Mar	Apr	May	Jun	Jul	Aug	Sep	Oct	Nov	Dec	Year
Record high °C (°F)	3.4 (38.1)	3.8 (38.8)	16.6 (61.9)	30.6 (87.1)	38.6 (101.5)	41.0 (105.8)	42.5 (108.5)	39.9 (103.8)	37.4 (99.3)	28.6 (83.5)	15.0 (59.0)	6.8 (44.2)	42.5 (108.5)
Mean daily maximum °C (°F)	−10.6 (12.9)	−9.0 (15.8)	−1.4 (29.5)	11.7 (53.1)	21.1 (70.0)	26.0 (78.8)	26.8 (80.2)	25.5 (77.9)	19.0 (66.2)	10.4 (50.7)	−1.0 (30.2)	−8.4 (16.9)	9.2 (48.6)
Daily mean °C (°F)	−14.9 (5.2)	−14.0 (6.8)	−6.3 (20.7)	5.9 (42.6)	14.5 (58.1)	19.7 (67.5)	20.8 (69.4)	19.0 (66.2)	12.6 (54.7)	5.1 (41.2)	−5.0 (23.0)	−12.5 (9.5)	3.7 (38.7)
Mean daily minimum °C (°F)	−19.3 (−2.7)	−18.7 (−1.7)	−11.0 (12.2)	0.5 (32.9)	7.9 (46.2)	13.2 (55.8)	14.9 (58.8)	13.1 (55.6)	7.1 (44.8)	0.7 (33.3)	−8.5 (16.7)	−16.7 (1.9)	−1.4 (29.5)
Record low °C (°F)	−45.8 (−50.4)	−47.8 (−54.0)	−37.3 (−35.1)	−24.0 (−11.2)	−9.5 (14.9)	−2.2 (28.0)	2.9 (37.2)	−0.7 (30.7)	−8.7 (16.3)	−23.0 (−9.4)	−37.6 (−35.7)	−44.5 (−48.1)	−47.8 (−54.0)
Average precipitation mm (inches)	18.0 (0.71)	16.7 (0.66)	20.1 (0.79)	25.8 (1.02)	37.1 (1.46)	37.3 (1.47)	51.9 (2.04)	38.6 (1.52)	26.9 (1.06)	30.9 (1.22)	24.0 (0.94)	24.2 (0.95)	351.5 (13.84)
Average extreme snow depth cm (inches)	22 (8.7)	26 (10)	23 (9.1)	3 (1.2)	0 (0)	0 (0)	0 (0)	0 (0)	0 (0)	0 (0)	4 (1.6)	13 (5.1)	26 (10)
Average rainy days	0	0	3	7	13	11	12	12	11	9	4	1	83
Average snowy days	19	16	12	4	1	0.1	0	0	0.3	5	13	18	88
Average relative humidity (%)	82	81	81	68	58	57	64	64	64	73	82	82	71
Mean monthly sunshine hours	96	141	201	251	296	322	321	283	210	139	90	78	2,428
Mean daily sunshine hours	3.1	5.0	6.5	8.4	9.6	10.7	10.4	9.1	7.0	4.5	3.0	2.5	6.7
Source 1: Pogoda.ru.net
Source 2: NOAA (sun, 1961–1990), Deutscher Wetterdienst (daily sun 1961-1990)

== Culture ==
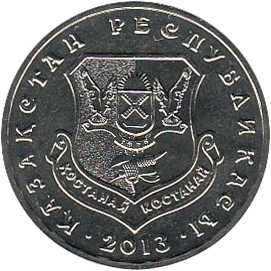
Coin with Kostanay coat of arms

Kostanay has a rich historical-cultural heritage. The regional center includes a Sunni mosque, the Regional Administration Building, Kostanay State University, the Kostanay Regional Memorial Museum of Altynsarin, the Kazakh Drama Theatre, Central Square and a railway station. Historical monuments include the Ybyrai Altynsarin monument, the Akhmet Baitursynov monument, a memorial dedicated to victims of the Second World War, the "Execution wall" (where Alexander Kolchak's army officers were executed by Red Army soldiers), and the Alexander Pushkin monument.

The city has 173 monuments of historical and cultural significance. Of these, 3 are of republican significance, 48 local, 25 obelisks and busts and 97 memorial plaques.[3]

== Transportation ==
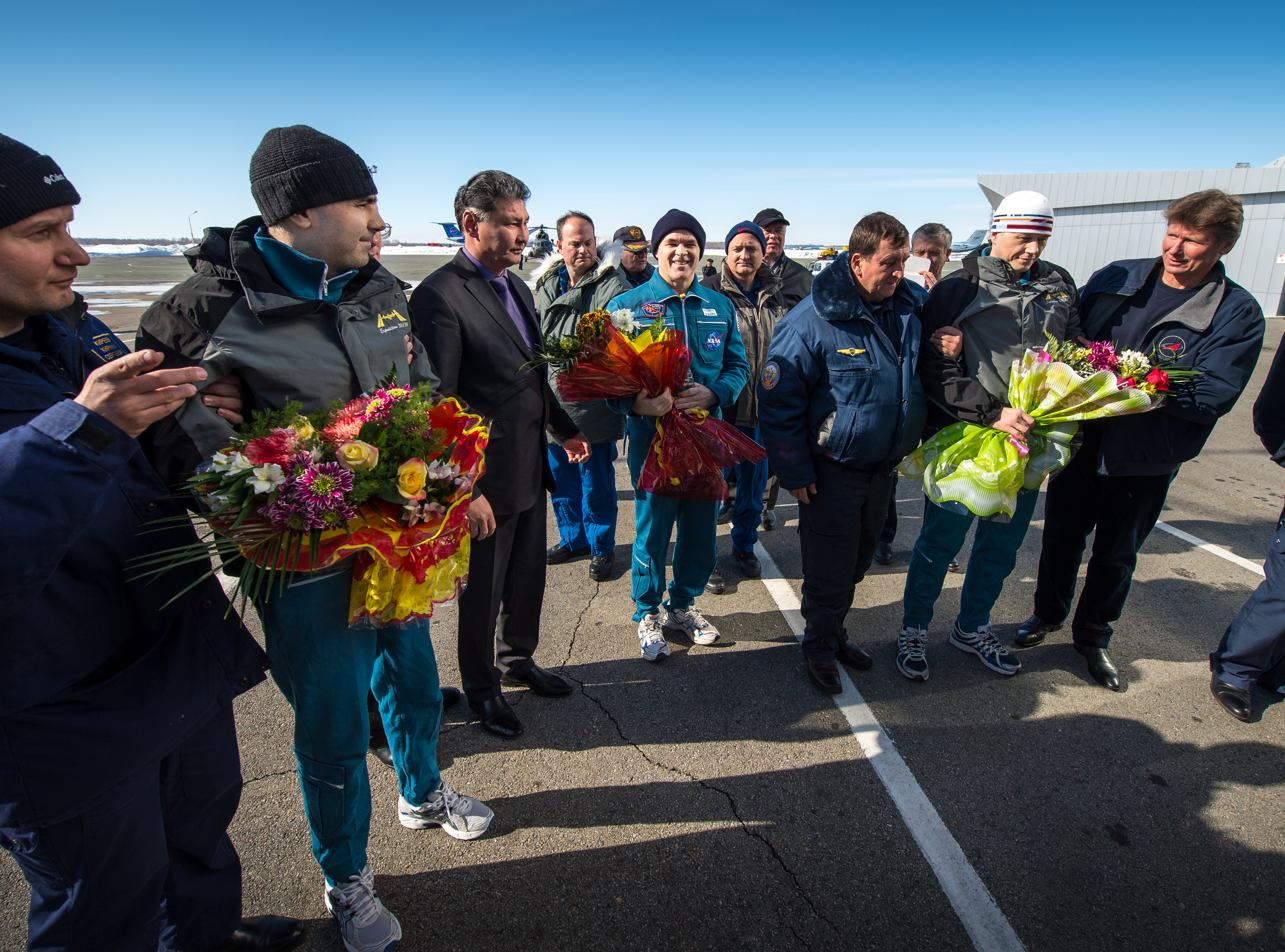
Soyuz TMA-06M crew members are greeted at the Kostanay Airport

Kostanay is connected by road with the following cities in Russia: Chelyabinsk, Magnitogorsk, Troitsk, Yekaterinburg, Kurgan and Tyumen. It is also connected to Kokshetau, Astana and Almaty in Kazakhstan. Fifty-three railway stations carry passengers and cargo from the city. Oil is delivered by rail from Russia as well as oil refineries in Kazakhstan.

Kostanay International Airport handles common and charter flights to many cities in Kazakhstan, former Soviet republics, Germany (Frankfurt and Hanover), the United Arab Emirates, Turkey, and other countries. The airport also functions as a local port of entry and customs checkpoint.

== Sport ==
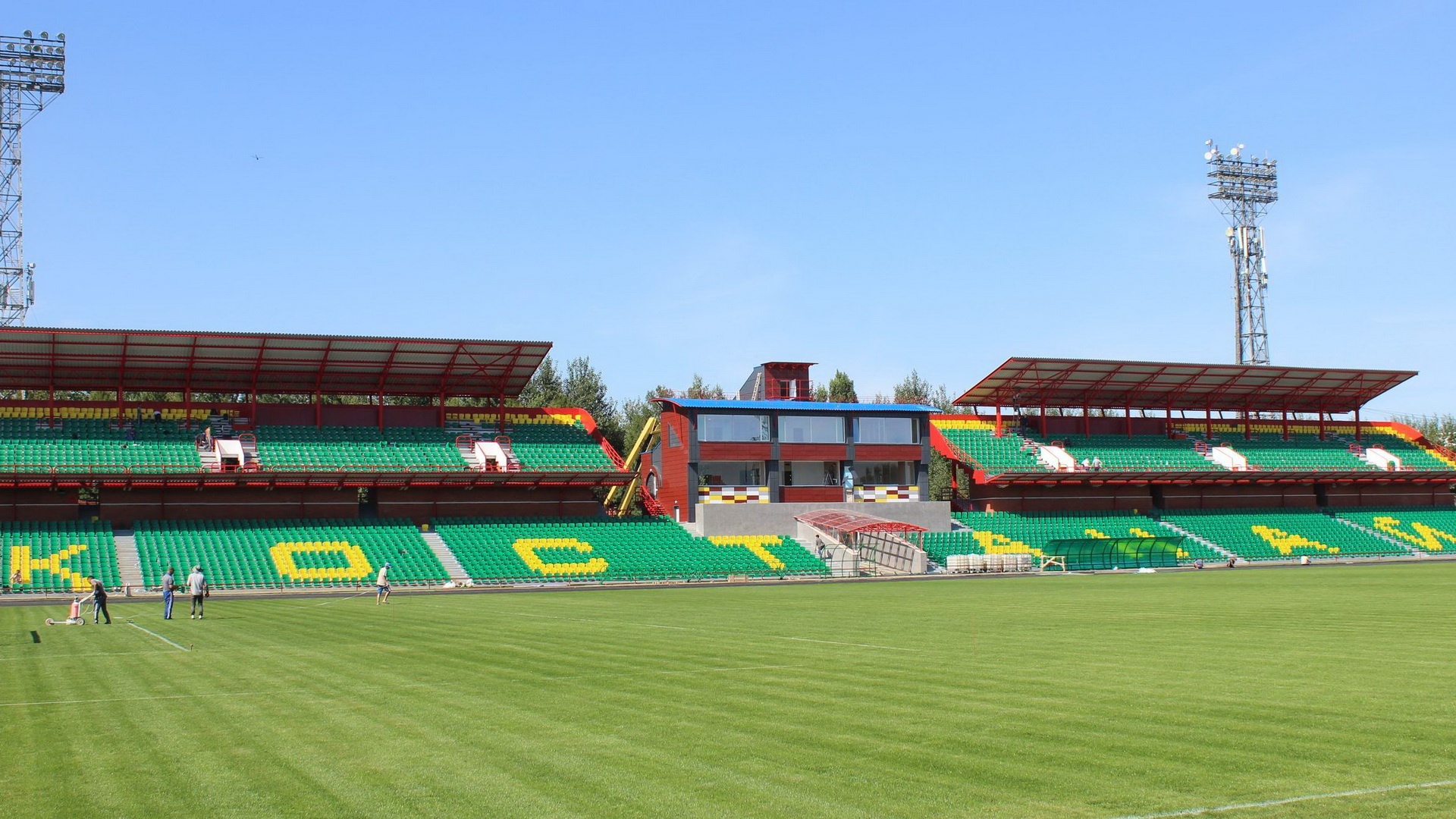
Kostanay Central Stadium, home venue of FC Tobol

Kostanay is home to the FC Tobol football club, based in the Kostanay Central Stadium, which participates in the Kazakhstan Super League. Kostanay also has a basketball team, BK Tobol Kostanay, which participates in the Kazakhstan Basketball Cup. The city has an ice rink for winter sports, and in 2016, a team participated in the national bandy championship in Khromtau for junior players born in 1999–2000.

== Notable people ==
- Petr Kostenko, chess Grandmaster
- Syrbai Maulenov (1922–1993), Kazakhstani poet
- Dmitry Petelin (born 1983), Russian cosmonaut/astronaut
- Aleksandr Zuev (born 1996), Russian and Kazakhstani footballer

== Twin towns – sister cities ==
Kostanay is twinned with:

- Kirklees, England, United Kingdom
