= Malik Jabir (Burundian footballer) =

Burundian footballer

Fazil Malikonge best known under his nickname Malik Jabir is a famous football player in Burundi who led his club Vital'O to the African Cup Winners' Cup final in 1992 before retiring from international competition in 1993 and is currently a customs agent in Burundi.

== Career ==
He was one of the most lethal and feared strikers in the history of football in Burundi who never had a chance to ply his trade overseas like most Burundian players before the 1993 war.
