= Maalik (disambiguation) =

Maalik is an Islamic angel and gatekeeper of hell.

Maalik may also refer to:

- Maalik (1972 film), an Indian Hindi drama film
- Maalik (2016 film), a Pakistani political-thriller film
- Maalik (2025 film), a Hindi action thriller film

== Given name ==
- Maalik Bomar
- Maalik Murphy
- Maalik Reynolds
- Maalik Wayns

== Fictional characters ==
- Farrah Maalik

== See also ==
- Abdul Maalik Wazir
- Maalika
