= Malik Sadr al-Din Tabrizi =

Malik Sadr al-Din Tabrizi (died 1269/70) was an Iranian statesman from the Malikan family, who served as the governor of his native city of Tabriz after its conquest by the Mongols in 1231. He went to Mongolia in 1251, where he was appointed as the tax-collector of northwestern Iran by the Mongol emperor Möngke Khan (r. 1251–1259). From there on Malik Sadr al-Din played a key-role in the financial administration of the materializing Ilkhanate, established by Möngke's brother Hulagu Khan (r. 1256–1265). Malik Sadr al-Din continued to govern Tabriz under the new realm, and was also a patron of Persian literature. He died in 1269 or 1270, and was survived by his son, Imad al-Din Muhammad.

== Sources ==
- Zakrzewski, Daniel (2017). "Malik Ṣadr al-Dīn Tabrīzī and the Establishment of Mongol Rule in Iran" (PDF). Asiatische Studien – Études Asiatiques. 71 (4). De Gruyter: 1059–1073. doi:10.1515/asia-2017-0007. S2CID 103270847.
