= Malik Riaz Khan =

Pakistani politician

MPA Malik Riaz Khan

Member of the Provincial Assembly of Khyber Pakhtunkhwa
- Incumbent
- Assumed office 2013-2018
- Constituency: PK-73 (Bannu-IV)

Personal details
- Born: 13 July 1948 (age 77) Bannu District
- Party: Jamiat Ulema-e-Islam (F)
- Occupation: Politician

Malik Riaz Khan (born 13 July 1948) is a Pakistani politician from Bannu District who served as a member of the Khyber Pakhtunkhwa Assembly belong to the Jamiat Ulema-e-Islam (F). He also served as chairman and member of the different committees.

== Political career ==
Khan was elected as the member of the Khyber Pakhtunkhwa Assembly on ticket of Jamiat Ulema-e-Islam (F) from PK-73 (Bannu-IV) in the 2013 Pakistani general election.
