= Ybyrai Altynsarin =

Kazakh educator (1841–1889)

- Ыбырай Алтынсарин
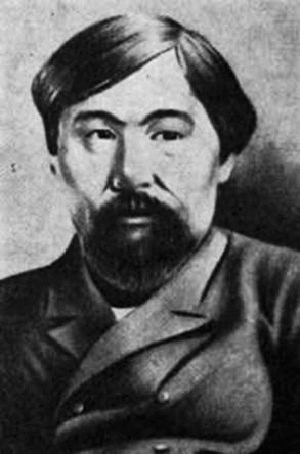
- Born: Ibrahim Altynsarin; 1 November 1841; Turgay Oblast, Russian Empire (now Kazakhstan)
- Died: 29 July 1889 (aged 47); Kostanay, Turgay Oblast, Russian Empire (now Kazakhstan)
- Known for: Progressive activism, pedagogy

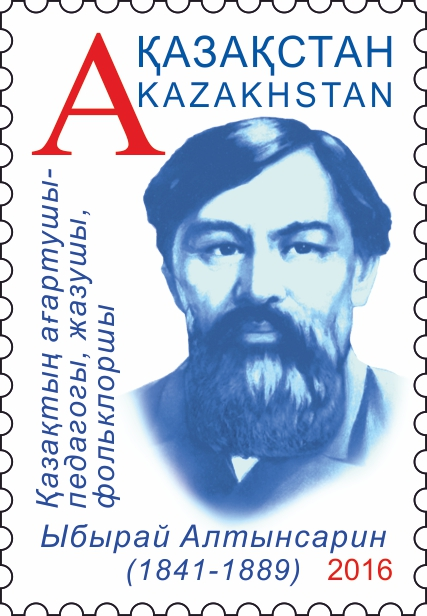
Altynsarin on a 2016 stamp of Kazakhstan

Ybyrai Altynsarin (Note: Kazakh: Ыбырай Алтынсарин; Russian: Ибрай Алтынсарин) (born Ibrahim Altynsarin; 1 November [O.S. 20 October] 1841 – 29 July [O.S. 17 July] 1889) was a major figure in pre-Soviet Kazakh history. He was the most prominent Kazakh educator of the 19th century, at the period of Russian colonization of and cultural influence in modern-day Kazakhstan.

Altynsarin was born in the Araqaraghai region of Turgay Oblast (now Kostanay Province) of modern-day Kazakhstan and in his early career he was an inspector of Torghai schools. Like all ethnic Kazakhs, Ibrahim was raised in a Muslim family.

Altynsarin is best known for introducing the transition from the Perso-Arabic alphabet to the Cyrillic alphabet for the Kazakh language, and was a proponent of teaching in the Western style. Being a Muslim, though, he opposed the teaching of Orthodox Christian doctrines to non-Russian Kazakhs, but at the same time urged resistance to the Tatar language and culture, in favor of Russian and Western influences. As an educator, he opened numerous Kazakh–Russian boarding schools, technical schools and schools for girls.

Altynsarin is also known as the author of the first Kazakh grammar book, the first Kazakh–Russian newspaper, and translator of a large number of textbooks and reference works. He was honored by the Imperial Russian government with numerous awards, including the title statski sovetnik (State Counsellor).

A number of Kazakh institutions, including the Kazakh Academy of Education, Arkalyk State Pedagogical Institute and some streets, schools, and academic awards, are named after Altynsarin. There is an Altynsarin museum in Kostanay.

Altynsarin grew up with his grandfather, Balgoja biy, because of the premature death of his father. He exceeded his studies at an Orenburg school.

In his last years, he decides to move 3 kilometers away from Kostanay and built a house there, near the river Tobyl. He works here until his death. He was buried near the river, near his father's coffin.

== Mausoleum and museum ==
A mausoleum and museum were constructed on the site of Altynsarin's final resting place in Kostanay (Kazakhstan).

== Legacy ==
On 2 November (2021), the country of Kazakhstan recognized the celebration of 190 years since the birth of the prominent Kazakh educated, Ybrai Altynsarin.

On 30 December 2021, a monument was opened in honor of Altynsarin in Almaty.

== See also ==
- History of Kazakhstan
