= Malik Jackson =

Malik Jackson may refer to:

== People ==
- Malik Jackson (boxer) (born 1994), American boxer
- Malik Jackson (defensive lineman) (born 1990), American football player
- Malik Jackson (linebacker) (born 1985), American football player
