= Maliq Pasha Gjinolli =

Albanian military commander (1760–1824)

- Pasha of Pristina, Sanjakbey of Skopje
- Reign: 1788–1823
- Predecessor: Ibrahim Pasha Gjinolli
- Successor: Jashar Pasha Gjinolli
- Known for: Consolidation of local power, defence of Ottoman authority in the Balkans
- Born: 1760; Vilayet of Kosovo, Ottoman Empire
- Died: 19 December 1823; Vilayet of Kosovo, Ottoman Empire
- Noble family: Gjinolli family
- Occupation: Ottoman official, military commander
- Military career
- Relatives: Jashar Pasha Gjinolli (Grandson)
- Allegiance: Ottoman Empire
- Rank: Sanjakbey of Skopje
- Commands: Army of ~10,000 men
- Conflicts: First and Second Serbian Uprisings

Maliq Pasha Gjinolli (1760–1824) was one of the most well-known figures of the noble Gjinolli family, which played a decisive role in the political, military, and administrative life of Kosovo at the end of the 18th century and the beginning of the 19th century. He served as sanjakbey of the Sanjak of Skopje, an important administrative position in the Ottoman Empire, under whose jurisdiction fell three kadiluks: Pristina, Vushtrri, and Novo Brdo. Pristina, where the center of his power was located, was transformed during his rule into a significant political and economic hub.

== Overview ==
Maliq Gjinolli managed to obtain the title of Pasha during the Austro-Turkish wars of 1778–1791. In the military confrontation in Bërzaske with the Serbian insurgents, he captured their leader Koçu Angjelković alive and as a reward from Sultan Selim III received the title of Pasha.

Maliq Pasha and his contemporary, Mahmut Pasha Rrotulla, the mutasarrif of Prizren, benefited from the internal crises of the Ottoman Empire and developments in Albania to consolidate their local power. At a time when the central Ottoman government was weakening, the sultan was forced to tolerate the growing power of local beys, including the Gjinollis. In this context, Maliq Pasha raised a regular army of around 10,000 soldiers (8,000 infantry and 2,000 cavalry) establishing a significant force in the region.

He actively participated in the suppression of the First Serbian Uprising in 1804 and the Second in 1815, intervening militarily in support of Ottoman authority. One of his most notable actions was the intervention to rescue Osman Pasha from the Serbian siege in Novi Pazar in 1809. Folk songs commemorating his military successes have been preserved, embedding his legacy in popular memory. At the height of its power, the Gjinolli family owned around 16,000 hectares of land across the Kosovo Plain, Anamorava, Vranje, Preševo and other strategic regions. Their de facto autonomy from Ottoman authority was further strengthened through alliances with other prominent Albanian figures of the time, such as Ali Pasha Tepelena and the pashas of Shkodra. These connections aimed to create broader autonomy for the Albanian vilayets within the Ottoman Empire. Maliq Pasha died in 1824, leaving behind an important political legacy and a consolidated local power structure, which continued to exist for a time under successors such as Jashar Pasha Gjinolli. He remains one of the most prominent representatives of the Albanian feudal aristocracy in Ottoman Kosovo.
