= PP-15 Rawalpindi-IX =

Constituency of the Provincial Assembly of Punjab, Pakistan

- Constituency for the Provincial Assembly of Punjab
- Region: Rawalpindi Cantonment (partly) of Rawalpindi District

Current constituency
- Created from: PP-9 Rawalpindi-IX (2002-2018); PP-14 Rawalpindi-IX (2018-2023)

PP-15 Rawalpindi-IX (پی پی-15، راولپنڈى-9) is a Constituency of the Provincial Assembly of Punjab.

== 2008—2013: PP-9 Rawalpindi-IX ==
Provincial election 2008: PP-9 Rawalpindi-IX
Party	Candidate	Votes	%	±%
PML(N)	Ch. Muhammad Ayyaz	26,171	58.53	
PPP	Ch. Muhammad Waris Khan Advocate	12,243	27.38	
PML(Q)	Raja Moeen Sultan	4,407	9.86	
Independent	Ch. Atif Aziz	501	1.12	
Independent	Khalid Rehman	366	0.82	
Independent	Babu Muhammad Idrees	309	0.69	
PST	Pir Syed Mudasar Nazar Shah	141	0.32	
MMA	Allama Ayyaz Zaheer Hashmi	39	0.09	
Independent	Ch. Arshad Nawaz	13	0.03	
Turnout		45,242	38.09	
Total valid votes		44,715	98.84	
Rejected ballots		527	1.16	
Majority		13,928	31.15	
Registered electors		118,789		

== 2013—2018: PP-9 Rawalpindi-IX ==
General elections were held on 11 May 2013. Asif Mehmood won this seat with 29797 votes.

Provincial election 2013: PP-9 Rawalpindi-IX
Party	Candidate	Votes	%	±%
PTI	Asif Mehmood	29,797	43.29	
PML(N)	Chaudhary Muhammad Ayaz	29,524	42.89	
PPP	Rizwan Moueed Raja	2,849	4.14	
AML	Adnan Ahmed Nisar	1,656	2.41	
Independent	Zeeshan Mumtaz	1,575	2.29	
JI	Muhammad Basharat Ahmed	1,342	1.95	
Others	Others (twelve candidates)	2,094	3.03	
Turnout		69,578	55.36	
Total valid votes		68,837	98.94	
Rejected ballots		741	1.06	
Majority		273	0.40	
Registered electors		125,695		
hold				

== 2018—2023 PP-14 Rawalpindi-IX ==
From 2018, PP-9 (Rawalpindi-IX) became PP-14 Rawalpindi-IX. With some changes as follows (a)The following Census Charges of Rawalpindi Cantonment (1) Charge No.3, excluding Circle Nos. 1, 2 and 3 (2) Charge No.4 (3) Charge No.5, and (4) Charge No.6

(b) The following census charges of Chaklala Cantonment are (1) Charge No.5, excluding Circle No. 4, and (2) Charge No.6 of Rawalpindi District.

Provincial election 2018: PP-14 Rawalpindi-IX
Party	Candidate	Votes	%	±%
PTI	Muhammad Basharat Raja	54,211	52.33	
PML(N)	Usama Chaudary	32,855	31.72	
TLP	Muhammad Waseem Farukh	6,767	6.53	
MMA	Rizwan Ahmed	5,093	4.92	
PPP	Agha Mujeeb Ahmed Khan	1,389	1.34	
Others	Others (eleven candidates)	3,277	3.16	
Turnout		104,735	51.34	
Total valid votes		103,592	98.91	
Rejected ballots		1,143	1.09	
Majority		21,356	20.61	
Registered electors		203,987		
hold				

== General elections 2024 ==
Provincial election 2024: PP-15 Rawalpindi-IX
Party	Candidate	Votes	%	±%
PML(N)	Malik Mansoor Aslam	62,165	44.18	
Independent	Ziyad Khaliq Kayani (Note: Filed nomination papers as PTI candidate but ECP allowed him to run as an Independent)	54,043	38.41	
JI	Rizwan Ahmed	6,083	4.32	
TLP	Muhammad Adeel	6,005	4.27	
PPP	Inam Malik	2,328	1.66	
Independent	Nehroz Khan	2,198	1.56	
PPP(SB)	Shabbir Abbas Abid	2,057	1.46	
Others	Others (twenty four candidates)	5,820	4.14	
Turnout		142,466	52.88	
Total valid votes		140,669	98.74	
Rejected ballots		1,767	1.26	
Majority		8,122	5.77	
Registered electors		269,413		
hold				

== See also ==
- PP-14 Rawalpindi-VIII
- PP-16 Rawalpindi-X
