= Malik Hoskins =

American football coach

Biographical details
- Born: Philadelphia, Mississippi, U.S.
- Education: University of Southern Mississippi

Coaching career (HC unless noted)

Football
- ?–2007: Murrah HS (MS) (AHC/OC)
- 2008–2013: Lane (OC/QB/WR)
- 2014: Lane (interim HC/OC)
- 2015: Lane (AHC/OC)
- 2016: Bacone (OC)
- 2017–2018: Lincoln (MO) (OC)
- 2019–2021: Lincoln (MO)
- 2022–2023: Campbell (WR)
- 2024: Milano Seamen (OC)

Track and field
- 2008–2014: Lane

Head coaching record
- Overall: 2–30 (football)

Malik Hoskins is an American college football coach. He was the head football coach for Lane College in 2014 and Lincoln University from 2019 to 2021. He also coached for Murrah High School, Bacone, Campbell, and the Milano Seamen of the European League of Football (ELF).

== Head coaching record ==
=== Football ===
Year	Team	Overall	Conference	Standing	Bowl/playoffs
Lane Dragons (Southern Intercollegiate Athletic Conference) (2014)
2014	Lane	1–8	1–6	6th (West)	
Lane:		1–8	1–6		
Lincoln Blue Tigers (Mid-America Intercollegiate Athletics Association) (2019–2021)
2019	Lincoln	1–10	1–10	11th	
2020–21	Lincoln	0–2	0–0	N/A	
2021	Lincoln	0–10	0–10	12th	
Lincoln:		1–22	1–20		
Total:		2–30			
