= Maral Ishan Mosque =

Mosque in Kostanay, Kazakhstan

Coordinates: 53°12′41″N 63°38′21″E

- Марал ишан мешіті
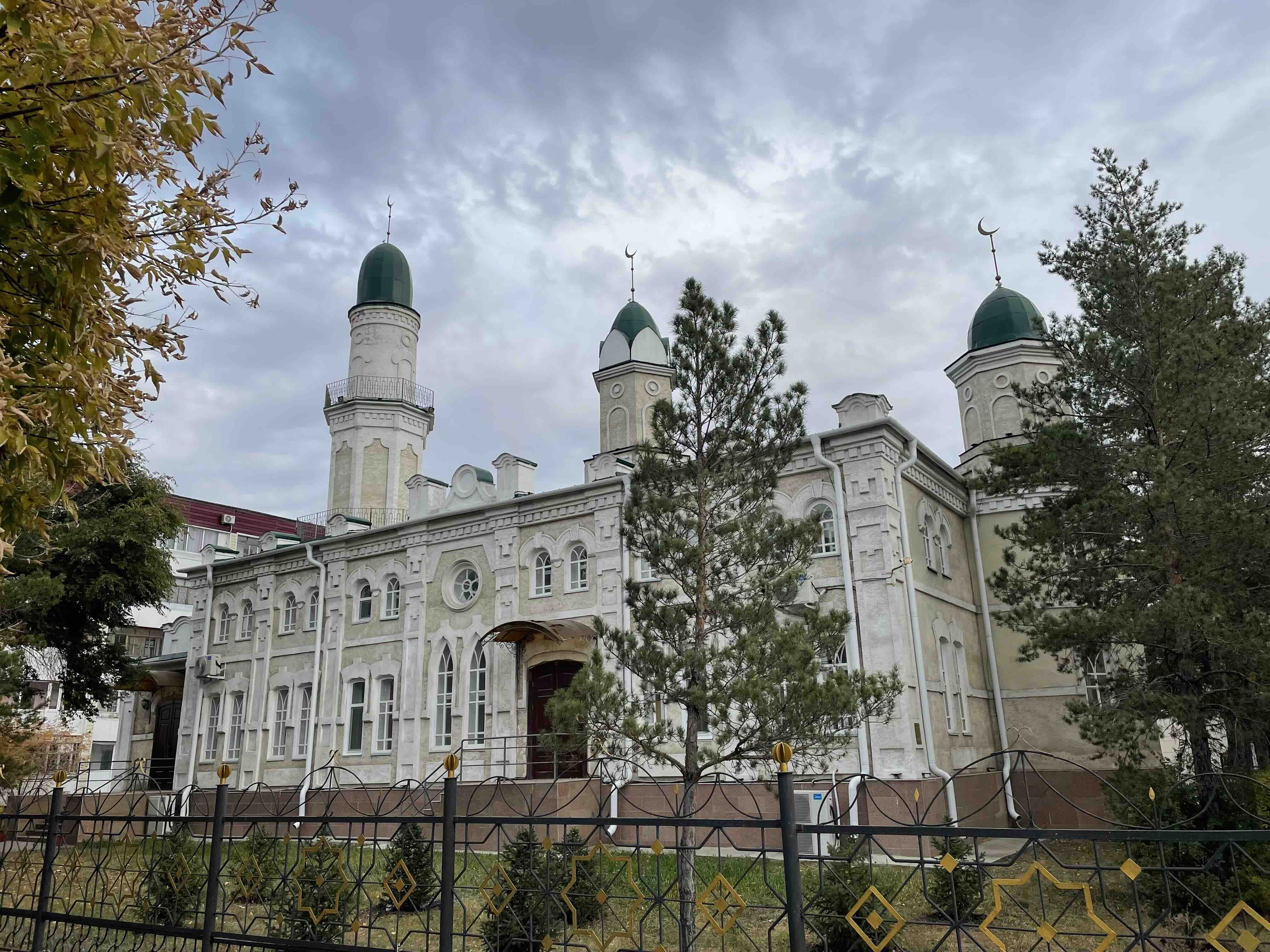

Religion
- Affiliation: Islam
- Region: Kostanay Region

Location
- Interactive map of Maral Ishan Mosque

Maral Ishan Mosque (Kazakh: Марал ишан мешіті), traditionally also known as the White Mosque (Kazakh: Ақмешіт), is the central and oldest mosque in the city of Kostanay, Kazakhstan. It is recognized as a monument of history and architecture of the Kostanay Region.

== History ==
By the end of the 19th century, the expansion of the city created the need for a large religious center for the Muslim population. Fundraising began among residents of the local Tatar settlement, with the principal benefactor being the merchant Abdulvali Yaushev. Construction was completed in 1893. After Abdulvali Yaushev's death in 1906, the mosque was supported by his younger brother, Mullagali Yaushev.

In 1931, the mosque building was repurposed as a club and cinema. During the Second World War, it served as an evacuation center and housed evacuees from Leningrad. After the war, the building accommodated a children's cinema.

In 1986, the structure was reconstructed and adapted for use as a concert hall of the Kostanay Regional Philharmonic.

In 1991, the building was returned to the Muslim community of the city. A major реконstruction was carried out in 2001; the opening of the renovated mosque was attended by the President of Kazakhstan, Nursultan Nazarbayev.

In 2002, the mosque was renamed in honor of the scholar Maral Ishan Kurmanuly.
