= Malik Muhammad Ali Khan =

Pakistani politician

Deputy Chairman of the Senate of Pakistan
- In office January 23, 1986 – March 20, 1988

Malik Muhammad Ali Khan was a Pakistani politician who served as the Deputy Chairman of the Senate of Pakistan from 23 January 1986 to 20 March 1988.
