= Malick Mbaye =

Malick Mbaye may refer to:

== People ==
- Malick Mbaye (footballer, born 1995) (born 1995), Senegalese footballer
- Malick Mbaye (footballer, born 1996) (born 1996), Senegalese footballer
- Malick Mbaye (footballer, born 2004) (born 2004), Senegalese footballer
- Malick M'Baye (Scouting), Senegalese Scouting trainer and UNESCO Executive Secretary
