= Malik Turner (rapper) =

American rapper

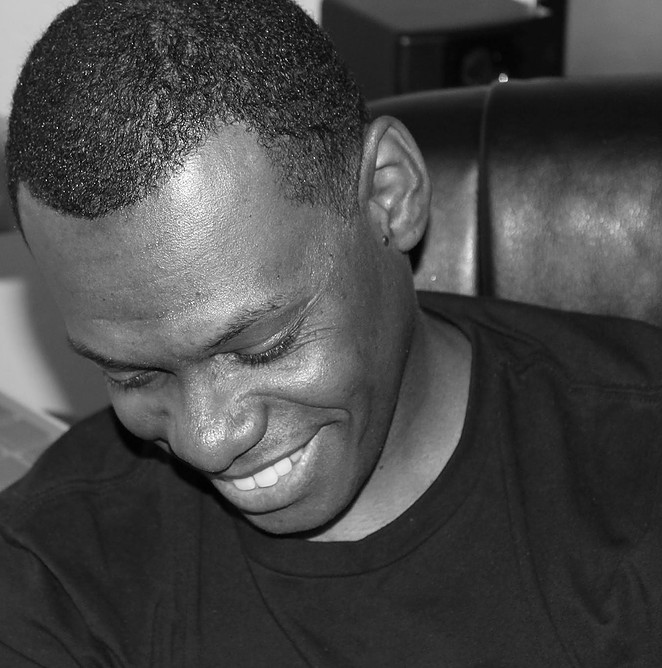
- Malik Turner (Artist/Producer)

Background information
- Also known as: The Vocalist, Mad Lyrics
- Origin: Fayetteville, NC
- Genres: Hip-Hop
- Occupations: Artist, Producer, Activist,
- Instruments: Vocals, Akai MPC (2000, 2000XL, Touch), Machine (MK, Studio), EPS16 Plus
- Years active: 1992-2001, 2006-Present
- Labels: Mpacked Sounds, Intelligent Muzik, Osceola Music Group
- Website: www.malikturner.com

Malik Turner (Michael Muhammad) is an American rapper and producer from Fayetteville, NC, who came to prominence in the 1990s as a rapper. He is known for his politically aware, socially conscious lyrics, and sample heavy production. Malik is the other half of the duo, "Malik Turner (Malik - Mad Lyrics) and DJ Master Jam". The duo was formed in the early 1990s when Malik and DJ, Master Jam were college students at Cheyney University. In 1992 Malik and Jam, along with two friends, Allen "Nadir" Muhammad and Milton "Fahyim" Sharp formed "Son of Man Productions". In 1994, with the support of Guru from Gang Starr, and DJ Sean Ski, Son of Man Productions released the classic independent single, No More 9 to 5 and The Last Days of Wax on their own label "Mpacked Sounds". The classic record was mastered by mastering engineer Tony Dawsey. Mpacked Sounds focused on a more independent label and artist ownership position in their music, during a time when their peers were interested in seeking record deals from major labels. At the time Billboard noted the lead single "No More 9 to 5", for having top 40 single potential and hip hop magazines like Rap Sheet and Rap Pages featured Malik and Master Jam as a rising duo to look out for. Projects with Mpacked Sounds led to opportunities to share the stage with the likes of Brand Nubian, the Fu-Schnickens, Black Sheep, Poor Righteous Teachers, Da Bush Babees, The U.M.C.'s, Rakim, and others.

Malik is also known for being a group member and lead vocalist (rapper) for the "New Blackbyrds", a Jazz fusion group formed by the legendary trumpeter, Donald Byrd; a sister project to Guru's (GangStarr) Jazzmatazz, The New Reality. Malik's work with Donald Byrd included numerous unreleased recorded songs, and performances at The Supper Club (NYC), SOB's, Brooklyn Academy of Music (BAM), the Playboy Jazz Festival (Hollywood Bowl), Catalina Jazz Club, Black Entertainment Television (Jazz Central) and more. Malik's association with Donald Byrd and the New Blackbirds has allowed him to share the stage with Jazz musicians such as Ramsey Lewis, Max Roach, Joe Sample, and others. Malik's unique lyrical ability and flexibility landed him the opportunity to perform in the dance musical "The Predators Ball -Huckstersof the soul" produced by Karole Armitage (The Armitage Foundation) and John Gould Rubin. The musical was performed at the Next Wave Festival, Brooklyn Academy of Music, and in Florence, Italy at Teatro Comunale Florence. Malik has written and performed for the sitcom "Cosby" with friend and actor Doug E. Doug, and also Jazz musician Don Braden.

== Discography ==
Malik Turner and Master Jam recently released music from the 1990s, which includes the re-release of "No-More 9 to 5" with additional unreleased songs on London based record label Chopped Herring Records. In 2016 Malik released Settlement #2 First Resurrection, Instrumentals on Mpacked Records. In 2011 Malik released two singles from his unreleased album Orgena: A Negro Spelled Backwards – "Serious???" feat. Adam Blackstone and "Get Your Mind Right". Malik has also done production on Ill Adrenaline artist's, Beneficence's 2016 album Basement Chemistry and did most of the production on his 2017 solo-album Invisible Freedom released on Osceola Music Group. Malik's work includes recordings and collaborations with artists and producers such as Beneficence, Jasiri X, Dominique Larue, Megahertz, 12 Finger Dan, DJ Sean Ski, DJ Master Jam, the late P-Original, Prince Strickland of Elwood, and more.
