= NA-90 Mianwali-II =

Constituency of the National Assembly of Pakistan

- Constituency for the National Assembly of Pakistan
- Region: Piplan Tehsil and Mianwali Tehsil (partly) including Mianwali city (partly) of Mianwali District
- Electorate: 503,085

Current constituency
- Party: Pakistan Tehreek-e-Insaf
- Member: Umair Khan Niazi
- Created from: NA-72 Mianwali-II

NA-90 Mianwali-II (این اے-90، میانوالی-۲) is a constituency for the National Assembly of Pakistan.

== Area ==
- Some areas of Mianwali Tehsil
- Piplan Tehsil

== Members of Parliament ==
=== 1970–1977: NW-45 Mianwali-II ===
Election	Member	Party
1970	Ghulam Hassan Khan Dhandla	ML(C)

=== 1977: NA-61 Mianwali-II ===
Election	Member	Party
1977	Amir Abdullah Khan Rokhri	PPP

=== 1985: NA-61 Mianwali-cum-Bhakkar ===
Election	Member	Party
1985	Sher Khan Afgan Niazi	Independent

=== 1988–2002: NA-54 Mianwali-I ===
Election	Member	Party
1988	Sher Khan Afgan Niazi	PAI
1990	Gul Hameed Khan Rokhri	IJI
1993	Obaidullah Khan Shadikhel	Independent
1997	Inamullah Khan Niazi	PML-N

=== 2002–2018: NA-72 Mianwali-II ===
Election	Member	Party
2002	Sher Khan Afgan Niazi	PPPP
2008	Humair Hayat Khan Rokhri	Independent
2013	Amjad Ali Khan	PTI

=== 2018–2023: NA-96 Mianwali-II ===
Election	Member	Party
2018	Amjad Ali Khan	PTI

=== 2024–present: NA-90 Mianwali-II ===
Election	Member	Party
2024	Umair Khan Niazi	PTI

== Election 2002 ==
General elections were held on 10 October 2002. Sher Afgan Khan Niazi of Pakistan Peoples Party Parliamentarian (PPPP) won by 50,210 votes.

General election 2002: NA-72 Mianwali-II
Party	Candidate	Votes	%	±%
PPP	Sher Afgan Niazi	50,210	34.92	
PML(Q)	Malik Muhammad Feroz Joya	46,246	32.16	
PML(N)	Inamullah Niazi	30,018	20.88	
MMA	Amir Abdullah Khan	13,558	9.43	
NA	Tariq Abbas Khan	3,356	2.33	
Independent	Sher Ahmed Khan Niazi	401	0.28	
Turnout		148,314	47.42	
Total valid votes		143,789	96.95	
Rejected ballots		4,525	3.05	
Majority		3,964	2.76	
Registered electors		312,785		

== Election 2008 ==
The result of the 2008 Pakistani general election in this constituency is given below.

=== Result ===
Humair Hayat Khan Rokhri succeeded in the 2008 election and became the member of National Assembly.

General election 2008: NA-72 Mianwali-II
Party	Candidate	Votes	%	±%
Independent	Humair Hayat Khan Rokhri	49,294	30.78	
PML(Q)	Sher Afgan Niazi	46,931	29.31	
PML(N)	Inamullah Niazi	44,868	28.02	
Independent	Muhammad Khurshid Anwar Khan	17,746	11.08	
Others	Others (two candidates)	1,290	0.81	
Turnout		166,415	54.06	
Total valid votes		160,129	96.22	
Rejected ballots		6,286	3.78	
Majority		2,363	1.47	
Registered electors		307,839		
Independent gain from PPP				

== Election 2013 ==
General elections were held on 11 May 2013. Amjad Ali Khan Niazi of the Pakistan Tehreek-e-Insaf won by 126,088 votes and became the member of National Assembly.

General election 2013: NA-72 Mianwali-II
Party	Candidate	Votes	%	±%
PTI	Amjad Ali Khan	126,088	54.68	
PML(N)	Humair Hayat Khan Rokhri	66,372	28.79	
Independent	Malik Sajjad Bhachar	27,124	11.76	
Others	Others (six candidates)	10,993	4.77	
Turnout		239,060	64.37	
Total valid votes		230,577	96.45	
Rejected ballots		8,483	3.55	
Majority		59,716	25.89	
Registered electors		371,374		
PTI gain from Independent				

== Election 2018 ==
General elections were held on 25 July 2018.

General election 2018: NA-96 Mianwali-II
Party	Candidate	Votes	%	±%
PTI	Amjad Ali Khan	157,422	60.27	
PML(N)	Humair Hayat Khan Rokhri	54,909	21.02	
TLP	Sajjad Ahmed Malik	30,542	11.69	
Others	Others (three candidates)	11,800	4.52	
Turnout		261,189	57.95	
Rejected ballots		6,516	2.50	
Majority		102,513	39.25	
Registered electors		450,741		
PTI hold		Swing	N/A	

== Election 2024 ==
General elections were held on 8 February 2024. Umair Khan Niazi won the election with 179,956 votes.

General election 2024: NA-90 Mianwali-II
Party	Candidate	Votes	%	±%
PTI	Umair Khan Niazi (Note: Filed nomination papers as PTI candidate but ECP allowed him to run as an Independent)	179,956	63.18	▲2.91
PML(N)	Humair Hayat Khan Rokhri	51,266	18.00	▼3.02
Independent	Ali Haider Noor Khan Niazi	23,983	8.42	
TLP	Muhammad Tayyab	12,690	4.46	▼7.23
Others	Others (twelve candidates)	16,921	5.94	
Turnout		293,043	58.25	▲0.30
Total valid votes		284,816	97.19	
Rejected ballots		8,227	2.81	
Majority		128,690	45.18	▲5.93
Registered electors		503,085		

== See also ==
- NA-89 Mianwali-I
- NA-91 Bhakkar-I
