= Trag =

Village in Punjab, Pakistan

Coordinates: 32°47′12″N 71°17′44″E

Trag ترگ
- Union council
- Interactive map of Trag ترگ
- Country: Pakistan
- Region: Punjab
- District: Mianwali District
- Tehsil: Isa Khel
- Time zone: UTC+5 (PST)

Trag (Urdu: ترگ) is a village and Union Council of Mianwali District in the Punjab province of Pakistan. Located within the Isakhel tehsil. Trag experiences the passage of several seasonal rivers during the monsoon season. These rivers collect water from the slopes of Koh-e-Suleman. Water from these rivers flows toward the Indus river and can overflow, causing damage to Trag. The three main seasonal rivers in the area are the Raka, Lunda, and Baroch.

== Background ==
Trag is named after an ancestor or elder, literally meaning “Iron Helmet”, This ancestor was the great-grandson of Isa Khan Niazi's, the paternal uncle of Isa Khan Niazi. He served as a combatant in Haibat Khan Niazi's army. The village was established between 1660-1685. It is populated mainly by Niazi Pathans, originally Afghan in origin and came from route starting in Wana and then going to Tank, Dera Ismail Khan, Lakki Marwat and Isakhel before finally coming to Trag.

== Other Tribes ==
Trag, while primarily home to the Niazi Pathans, also houses a diverse population of other tribes and clans that inhabit the Isakhel region. These communities have resided in Trag for generations, having migrated from various parts of Khyber Pakhtunkhwa (KPK) and other regions of Pakistan. People from neighboring KPK districts like Lakki Marwat and Karak visit the village. Traders from these areas purchase significant quantities of wheat and wheat straw to sustain their livestock during the winter. Most of the local tribes engage in agriculture, cultivating crops like wheat, mung beans, maize, millet, sugarcane, and cotton. Common livestock includes buffaloes, cows, goats, sheep, donkeys, and horses.
