= Amjad Ali Khan Niazi =

Pakistani politician

- امجدعلی خان نیازی
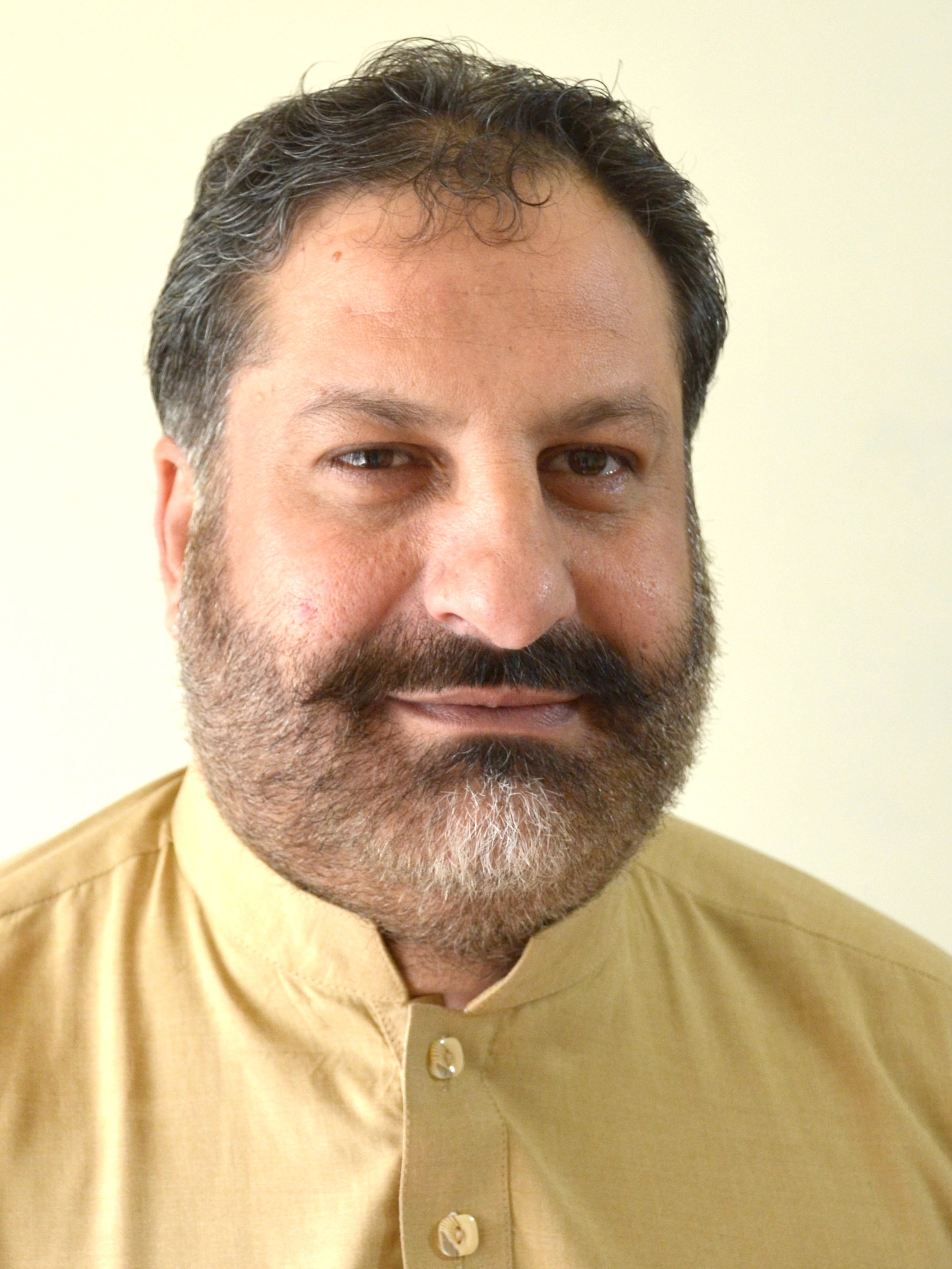

Chairman Standing Committee on Defence
- In office 13 February 2019 – 9 April 2022

Member of the National Assembly of Pakistan
- In office 13 August 2018 – 20 January 2023
- Constituency: NA-96 (Mianwali-II)
- In office 1 June 2013 – 31 May 2018
- Constituency: NA-72 (Mianwali-II)

Personal details
- Born: 8 October 1972 (age 53) Mianwali, Punjab, Pakistan
- Party: PTI (2013-present)
- Parent: Sher Afgan Niazi (father)

Amjad Ali Khan Niazi (Urdu: امجد علی خان نیازی; born 8 October 1972) is a Pakistani politician who had been a member of the National Assembly of Pakistan from August 2018 till January 2023. Previously he was a member of the National Assembly from June 2013 to May 2018. He had been elected as District Naib Nazim during Military Dictator Gen Musharraf Period for 4 Years and Later he had been elected as Mianwali City Tehsil Nazim also

== Early life ==
He was born on 8 October 1972.

== Political career ==
He was elected to the National Assembly of Pakistan as a candidate of Pakistan Tehreek-e-Insaf (PTI) from Constituency NA-72 (Mianwali-II) in the 2013 Pakistani general election. He received 126,088 votes and defeated Humair Hayat Khan Rokhri.

He was re-elected to the National Assembly as a candidate of PTI from Constituency NA-96 (Mianwali-II) in the 2018 Pakistani general election.

On 13 February 2019, he was elected as the Chairman of the Standing Committee of the National Assembly of Pakistan on Defence.

Occasionally, he acts as the Chairman of the assembly sessions of the National Assembly when the Speaker and Deputy Speaker are not present in the sessions.

== See also ==
- List of members of the 15th National Assembly of Pakistan
