= Khawas Khan Marwat =

Afghan Sur general (16th century)

- Died: 1552
- Occupation: Senior Commander of Sher Shah
- Spouse: A daughter of Rai Sarang of Rohtas

Khawas Khan Marwat was one of the best generals of Sher Shah Suri, having played a major role in defeating the Mughal Emperor Humayun in 1539 at the Battle of Chausa. He was an Afghan belonging to the Bahram branch of the Marwat tribe. He was originally a poor fox hunter, but Sher Shah spotted his potential and elevated him to the position of a general. According to historical accounts he was born of a slave woman to a household of Lohani Marwats.

After victory in the Battle of Sammel, Khawas Khan Marwat took possession of Jodhpur and occupied the territory of Marwar from Ajmer to Mount Abu in 1544. When Humayun fled from Agra towards Multan, Sher Shah dispatched Khawas Khan and the greater part of his army to pursue him and drive him beyond the borders of India. The Mughal division which had quit Humayun and was marching toward Kabul, encountered Khawas Khan and not being strong enough, fled. Khawas Khan then rejoined Sher Shah. Sher Shah built Rohtas Fort in Jhelum to keep down Gakhars and to block Emperor Humayun's return to India, and appointed Khawas Khan the administrative head of the fort.

== Revolt against Islam Shah Suri ==
Khawas Khan along with eminent nobles like Qutb Khan Naib, Isa Khan Niazi, and Jal Khan Julwani stood against Islam Shah Suri in support of Adil Khan. Adil Khan revolted and, accompanied by Khawas Khan, proceeded to attack Agra, but he was defeated in a battle outside the town. He fled to Panna and was not heard of again. Khawas Khan also fled towards Sarhind.

Islam Shah tried to kill all those nobles who were supposedly sympathetic to Adil Khan. Haibat Khan Niazi revolted against the Sultan. Khawas Khan also came and joined him. Islam Shah went himself to suppress this revolt. He met the rebels near Ambala in 1547. Khawas left Haibat Khan on the eve of the battle because he wanted to fight in the name of Adil Khan while Haibat Khan was fired with the ambition to be crowned. The Niazis were defeated and Islam Shah pursued them up to the bank of the Jhelum River. He left an army to suppress the fugitives and himself returned to Agra.

== Refuge in the Kingdom of Kumaon ==
In 1541 Khavas Khan fled to the Kingdom of Kumaun and begged for shelter from Maharaja Manik Chand. The Sultan of Delhi wrote to the Maharaja of Kumaon to surrender Khavas Khan to him. The imperial commander was ordered that if the Maharaja did not surrender Khavas Khan to him, he should devastate his country. The Maharaja replied in his letter to the Sultan -

"How can one imprison the man who has begged for my shelter. Till my last breath I would not be guilty of such a mean act."

Atkinson writes that Abdullah in his Tarikh-i-Dawudi has praised the act of bravery by the Chand kings of Kumaun. Atkinson writes -

"The magnanimity shown by the Kumaoni Raja is a bright spot in the annals of the Chands and is recognised even by Mussalman historians".

== Death ==
Khavas Khan later on surrendered and by the order of Islam Shah Suri his head was chopped off and husk was filled in his skin.

== See also ==
- Sher Shah Suri
- Islam Shah Suri
- Marwat
- Rohtas Fort
