= Rokhri =

Village in Pakistan

روکھڑی
- Town
- Rokhri Town
- Map of Punjab with Mianwali District روکھڑی highlighted Location of Rokhri of district Mianwali within Punjab.

Rokhri
- Union council
- Country: Pakistan
- Province: Punjab
- District: Mianwali
- Tehsil: Mianwali

Government
  - MNA: Imran Khan
  - General Councillor: Saif Ullah Khan Niazi Kallah Khel

Population
  - Total: 421,500

Rokhri is a town and union council of Mianwali District, in the Punjab province of Pakistan. It is located at 32°39'25N 71°30'37E.

The town of Rokhri is situated in constituency NA-95, in 2018 general election Imran Khan, the prime minister of Pakistan was elected from this constituency.

== Notable Niazis from Rokhri tribe ==
- Humair Hayat Khan Rokhri: Current politician, Sammad Khel
- Aamir Hayat Khan Rokhri: Pakistani politician and member of the Punjab Provincial Assembly, Sammad Khel
- Amir Abdullah Khan Rokhri: Pakistani politician
