= Umair Khan Niazi =

Pakistani politician

- عمیر خان نیازی

Member of the National Assembly of Pakistan
- Incumbent
- Assumed office 29 February 2024
- Constituency: NA-90 Mianwali-II

Personal details
- Party: PTI (2013-present)

Umair Khan Niazi (Urdu: عمیر خان نیازی) is a Pakistani politician who has been a member of the National Assembly of Pakistan since February 2024. He went to Aitchison College, Lahore. He did his LLB (Hons) Law from University College London and Bar at Law from City University London and is a member of Lincoln’s Inn.

== Political career ==
He was elected to the National Assembly of Pakistan from NA-90 Mianwali-II as an independent candidate supported by Pakistan Tehreek-e-Insaf (PTI) in the 2024 Pakistani general election. He received 179,956 votes while runner up Humair Hayat Khan Rokhri of Pakistan Muslim League (N) received 51,266 votes.
