= Isa Khel (sub-tribe) =

Isakhel
Regions with significant populations
- Pakistan

Languages
- Pashto • Saraiki • Urdu • English

Religion
- Sunni Islam

Related ethnic groups
- Pashtuns • Niazi

Isa Khel (Pashto: عیسیٰ خیل) is a sub-tribe of the Pashtun Niazi tribe. The earliest recorded mention of the Isa Khel tribe is in Baburnama, 1504-1505. Most of the tribe still resides in their ancestral town of Isakhel, named after their ancestor Isa Khan Niazi son of Umar Khan Niazi, but a lot have shifted to bigger cities or different towns in pursuit of a better education and livelihood opportunities.

== Clans ==
- Zakku Kheyl Many in the southern area of Isakhel belong to this clan, most influential due to their substantial agriculture land.
- Mammu Khel This tribe mainly live in southern suburbs and villages of Isakhel comprising 60% population of Isa Khel sub-tribe. The names of their villages are Khaglanwala, Behu, Sarwar Khel, Wandha Ghalay Khel, Attock Paniala, and Khira in Laki Marwat District. A notable sub-clan is Khizar Khel
- Appoo Khel People of this clan live in Isakhel city with unchanged name of Appo Khel
- Badunzye People of this clan live in the southern villages of Isa Khel city. Maulana Abdusattar Khan Niazi belonged to this particular clan.

== Notable people ==
- Abdul Hafeez Khan, politician
- Abdul Razzaq Khan, politician
- Abdul Rehman Khan, politician
- Abdul Sattar Khan Niazi, religious and political leader
- Attaullah Khan Esakhelvi, folk musician
- Maqbool Ahmed Khan (MNA), politician
- Col. Mohammad Aslam Khan, politician
- Zakia Shahnawaz Khan, politician
