= Lodi dynasty =

Rulers of the Delhi Sultanate in India, 1451–1526

Lodi dynasty لودی
- 1451–1526
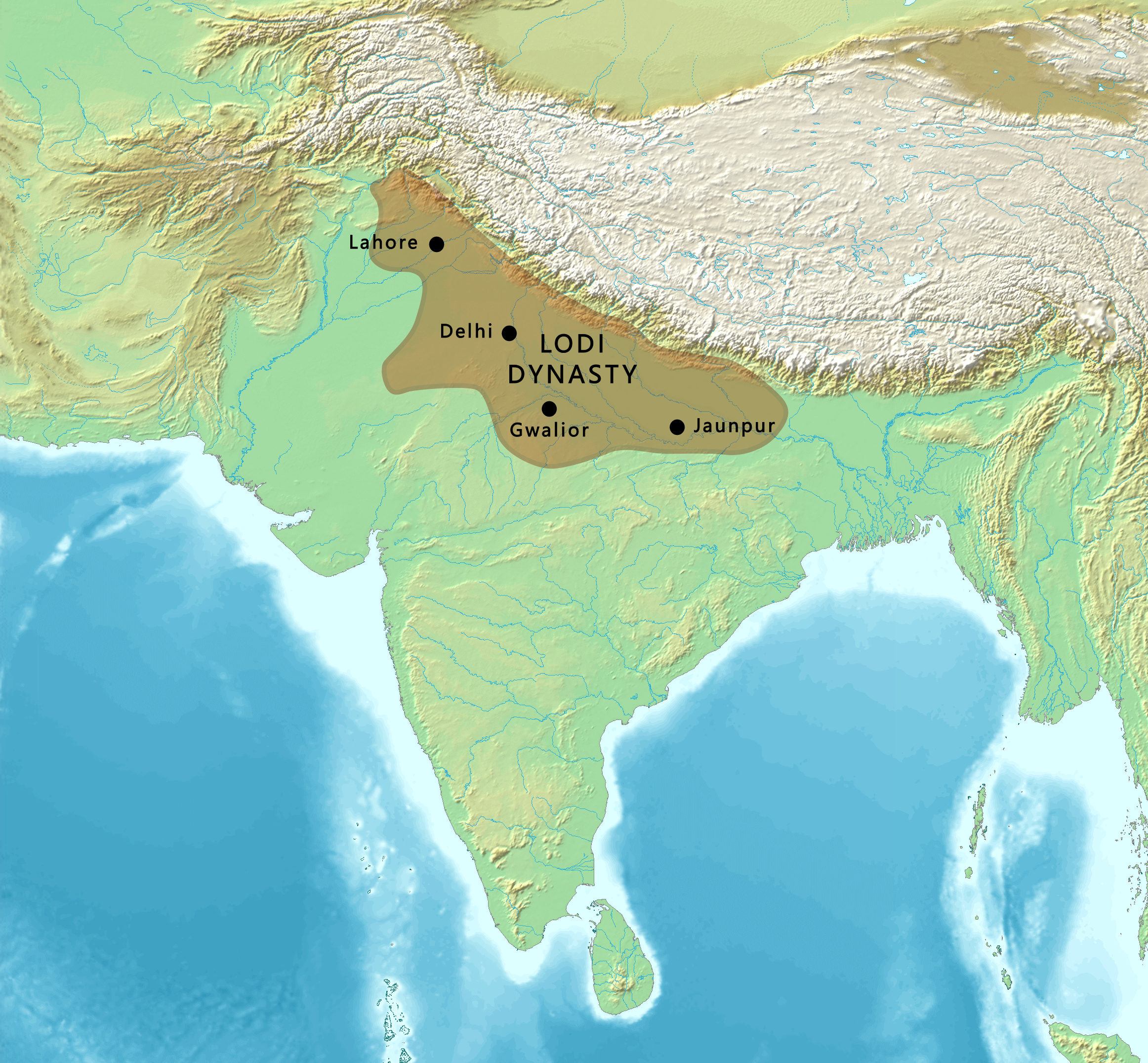
- Map showing the territory under the Lodi dynasty.
- Capital: Delhi
- Official languages: Hindavi; Persian (court, revenue records)
- Religion: Sunni Islam
- Government: Monarchy
- Sultan
  - 1451–1489: Bahlul Lodi (first)
  - 1489–1517: Sikandar Lodi (2nd)
  - 1517–1526: Ibrahim Lodi (last)
- History
  - Established: 19 April 1451
  - Lodi–Sharqi War: 1452–1500
  - First Battle of Panipat: 21 April 1526
Preceded by	Succeeded by
Sayyid dynasty; Jaunpur Sultanate	Mughal Empire

The Lodi dynasty was a dynasty that ruled the Sultanate of Delhi from 1451 to 1526. (Note: also known as the Lodi Empire) It was the fifth and final dynasty of the Delhi Sultanate, with three rulers ascending to throne, and was founded by Bahlul Lodi when he replaced the Sayyid dynasty.

== Background ==
Following the reign of the Sayyids, the Afghan or Turco-Afghan (Note: Scholars such as J. S. Grewal and Herbert Hartel call the Lodi sultans as Turco-Afghan.) Lodi dynasty rose to power. The tribe was initially settled in an area between Gomal River and Sulaiman Mountains in what was then known as Roh. Lodis were significantly involved in the valuable horse trading between Turan and India.

The grandfather of Bahlul, Malik Bahram, was a horse merchant who took up service of Malik Mardan Daulat, the governor of Multan under Firuz Shah Tughlaq. His son Sultan Shah received the Iqta' of Sirhind and the title of Islam Khan from Khizr Khan due to his bravery in a battle. Islam Khan made Sirhind his centre and gathered a large following, mainly of his kinsmen. He had chosen his nephew and son-in-law Bahlul Khan Lodi (r. 1451–1489) as his successor but after his death in 1431, Lodis got divided into several camps, including that of Bahlul and his uncle Malik Feroz. In 1436, Sultan Muhammad Shah IV sent an army against them under Sikander Tohfa and Jasrat Khokhar; in the succeeding conflict, a son of Malik Feroz was killed along with a number of followers and they lost Sirhind, but Bahlul soon succeeded in uniting them.

== History ==
=== Bahlul Lodi ===
According to Tarikh-i-Dawudi, Bahlul also started his career as a horse merchant, later receiving a pargana near Lahore from Sultan Muhammad Shah after he successfully put down a rebellion there. Under his patronage, Bahlul soon came to control most of parganas around Lahore. After the defeat of Lodis in 1436, he initially compensated his followers by raiding merchants on highways, and later re-established himself at Sirhind. He assisted Muhammad Shah against sultan Mahmud Khalji of Malwa and received the title of Khan-i Khanan. In 1441, he was appointed governor of Lahore and Dipalpur by Muhammad Shah to combat Jasrat Khokhar, but Bahlul made peace with him. By the time Sultan Alauddin Shah acceded to throne, Bahlul controlled vast tracts. His siege of Delhi failed in 1447, but after conflict between Alauddin Shah and his vizier Hamid Khan in 1451, Bahlul again marched to Delhi. Alauddin voluntarily retired to Badaun while Bahlul Khan Lodi ascended the throne of the Delhi Sultanate on 19 April 1451.

The most important event of his reign was the conquest of the Jaunpur Sultanate. Bahlul spent most of his time in fighting against the Sharqi dynasty of the Jaunpur Sultanate and ultimately annexed it. He placed his eldest surviving son Barbak on the throne of Jaunpur in 1486. The Sharqis remained in control of Bihar, from which they re-occupied Jaunpur, but were again repulsed to Bihar.

=== Sikandar Khan Lodi ===
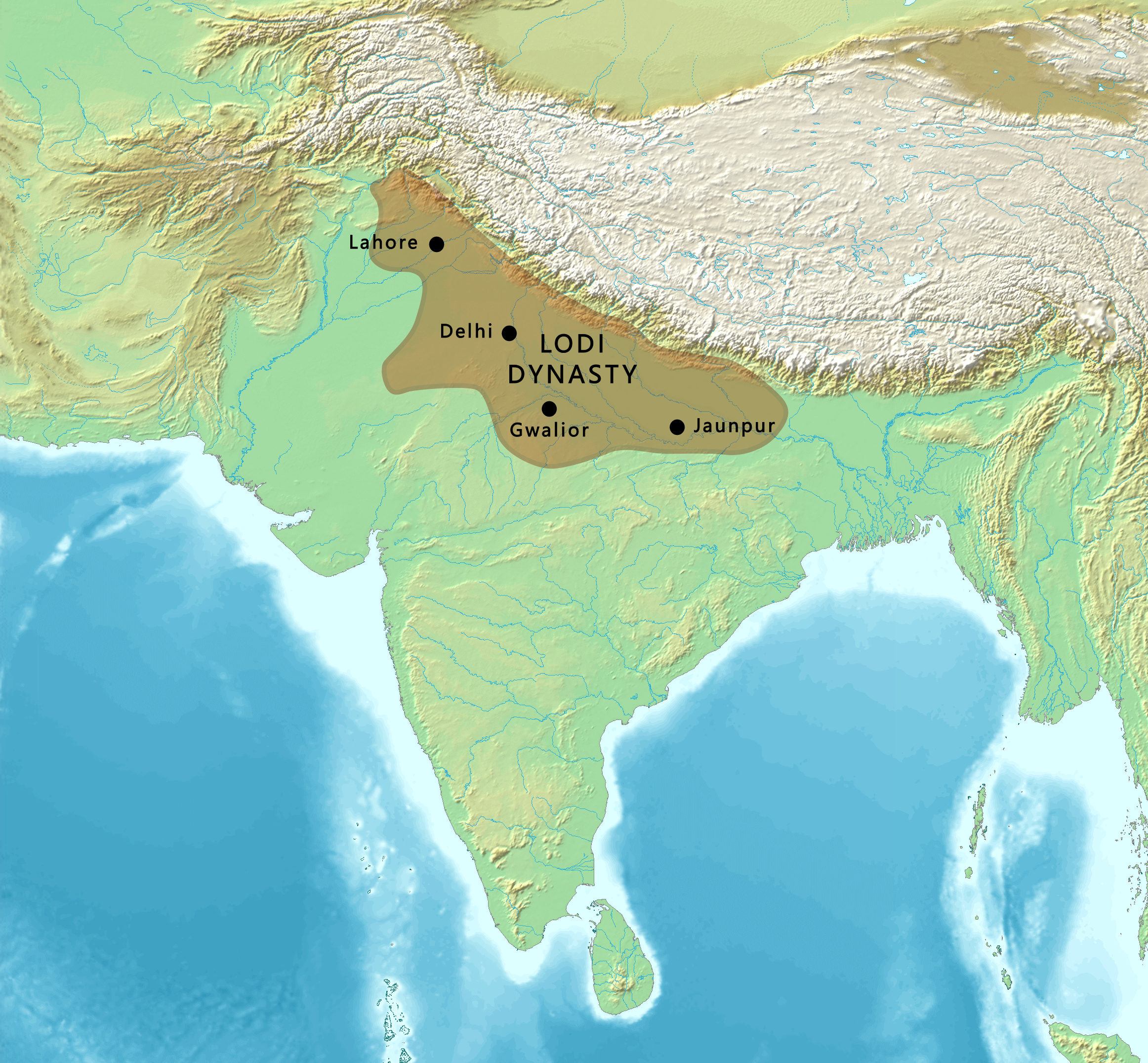
Sikandar II finished the conquest of the Jaunpur Sultanate (Sharqis dynasty) in 1479.

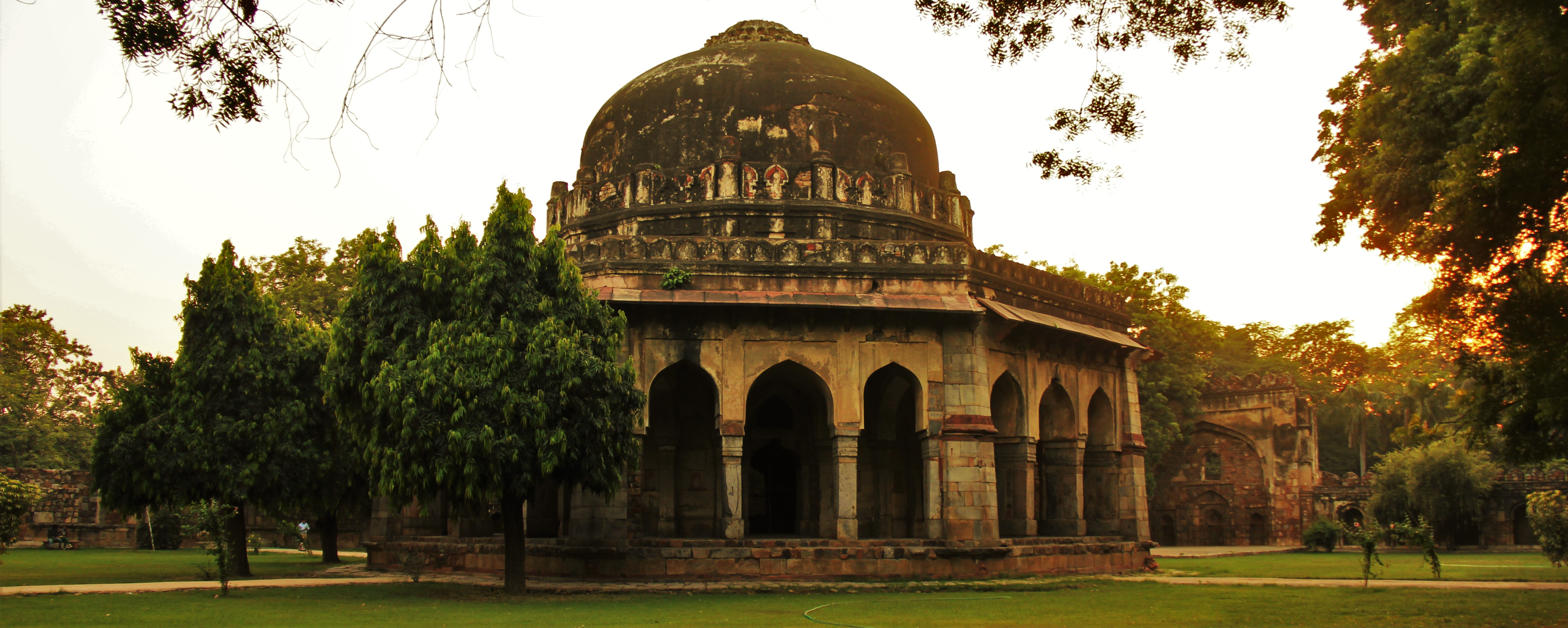
The Tomb of Sikandar Lodi.

Sikandar Khan Lodi (r. 1489–1517), born Nizam Khan, the second son of Bahlul, succeeded him after his death on 17 July 1489 and took up the title Sikandar Shah. His father nominated him as his successor and he was crowned sultan on 15 July 1489. He re-founded Agra as a Muslim city in 1504 and built mosques. He shifted the capital from Delhi to Agra. He patronized trade and commerce. He was a reputed poet, composing Persian poetry under the pen name 'Gulrukhi'. He was also a patron of learning and ordered translations of Sanskrit works in medicine into Persian. He curbed the individualistic tendencies of his Pashtun nobles and compelled them to submit their accounts to a state audit. He was thus able to infuse vigour and discipline in the administration. His greatest achievement was the conquest and annexation of Bihar from the Sharqis.

Sikandar Lodi was a staunch Muslim, destroying many temples all across northern India. He also forbade the yearly procession of the famed Muslim martyr Salar Mas'ud's spear, while forbidding Muslim women from venerating mausoleums of Muslim saints. Sikander allowed the execution of a Brahman, who had held the equal accuracy of his faith with that of Islam.

=== Ibrahim Lodi ===
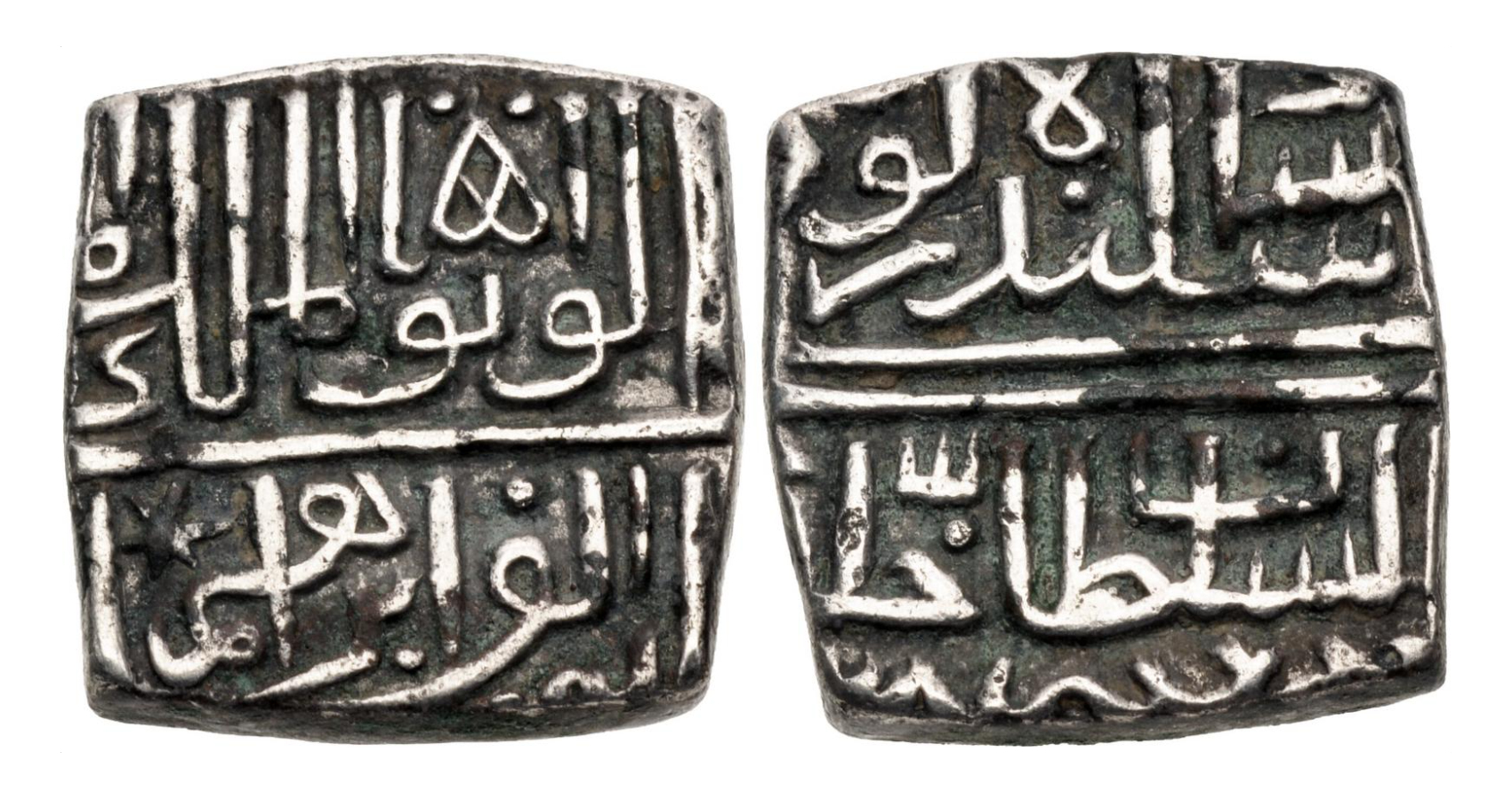
Coinage of Mahmud Shah II (1510-1531 CE) of the Malwa Sultanate, in the name of Ibrahim Lodi, Sultan of Delhi, dated 1520-1 CE.

Ibrahim Khan Lodi (r. 1517–1526), the eldest son of Sikandar, was the last Lodi sultan of Delhi. Ibrahim faced numerous rebellions and kept out the opposition for almost a decade. He was engaged in warfare with the Afghans and the Timurid Empire for most of his reign and died trying to keep the Lodi dynasty from annihilation.

=== Decline ===
Location of the Delhi Sultanate and neighbouring polities, circa 1525 CE, on the eve of the establishment of the Mughal Empire.

By the time Ibrahim ascended the throne, the political structure in the Lodi dynasty had dissolved due to abandoned trade routes and the depleted treasury. The Deccan was a coastal trade route, but in the late fifteenth century the supply lines had collapsed. The decline and eventual failure of this specific trade route resulted in cutting off supplies from the coast to the interior, where the Lodi empire resided. The Lodi dynasty was not able to protect itself if warfare were to break out on the trade route roads; therefore, they didn't use those trade routes, thus their trade declined and so did their treasury leaving them vulnerable to internal political problems.

In order to take revenge of the insults done by Ibrahim, the governor of Lahore, Daulat Khan Lodi asked the Timurid ruler of Kabul, Babur to invade his kingdom. Ibrahim Lodi was thereafter killed in a battle with Babur, at the battle of Panipat. With the death of Ibrahim Lodi, the Lodi dynasty also came to an end, leading to the establishment of the Mughal Empire in the subcontinent.

==== Causes of decline ====
A major problem Ibrahim faced when he ascended the throne in 1517 were the Pashtun nobles, some of whom supported Ibrahim's older brother, Jalaluddin Lodi, in taking up arms against his brother in the area in the east at Jaunpur. Ibrahim gathered military support and defeated his brother by the end of the year. After this incident, he arrested those Pashtun nobles who opposed him and appointed his own men as the new administrators. Other Pashtun nobles supported the governor of Bihar, Dariya Khan, against Ibrahim.

Another factor that caused uprisings against Ibrahim was his lack of an apparent successor. His own uncle, Alam Khan, betrayed Ibrahim by supporting the Mughal invader Babur.

Rana Sanga, the Rajput leader of Mewar (r. 1509–1526), also extended his kingdom, and fought the Lodi king of Delhi in multiple battles. Daulat Khan, the governor of Punjab region asked Babur to invade the Lodi kingdom, with the thought of taking revenge from Ibrahim Lodi. Babar also accused Sanga of sending an invitation however, this claim has been rejected and is not widely accepted by scholars.

=== Battle of Panipat, 1526 ===
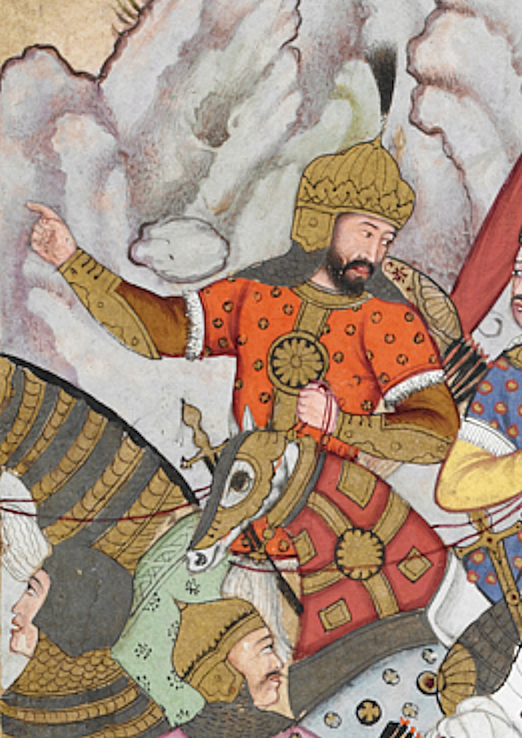
Sultan Ibrahim Lodi, last sultan of the Lodi dynasty, at the Battle of Panipat (1526) against Babur. Baburnama c.1590

Despite both being Sunni Muslims, Babur wanted to annex Ibrahim's territory. Babur and his army of 24,000 men marched to the battlefield at Panipat armed with muskets and artillery. Ibrahim prepared for battle by gathering 100,000 men (well-armed but with no guns) and 1,000 elephants. Ibrahim was at a disadvantage because of his outmoded infantry and internecine rivalries. Even though he had more men, he had never fought in a war against gunpowder weapons and he did not know what to do strategically. Babur pressed his advantage from the start and Ibrahim perished on the battlefield in April 1526, along with 20,000 of his men. This marked the end of the Lodi dynasty and the rise of the Mughal Empire in India led by Babur (r. 1526–1530).

=== Aftermath ===
After Ibrahim's death, Babur named himself emperor over Ibrahim's territory, instead of placing Alam Khan (Ibrahim's uncle) on the throne. Ibrahim's death marked the end of the Lodi dynasty and led to the establishment of the Mughal Empire in India. The remaining Lodi territories were absorbed into the new Mughal Empire. Babur continued to engage in military campaigns.

Ibrahim Lodi's brother, Mahmud Lodi, declared himself Sultan and continued to resist Mughal forces. He provided around 4,000 Afghan soldiers to Rana Sanga in the battle of Khanwa in 1527. After that defeat, Mahmud Lodi fled eastwards and again posed a challenge to Babur two years later at the battle of Ghaghra in 1529.

== Culture ==
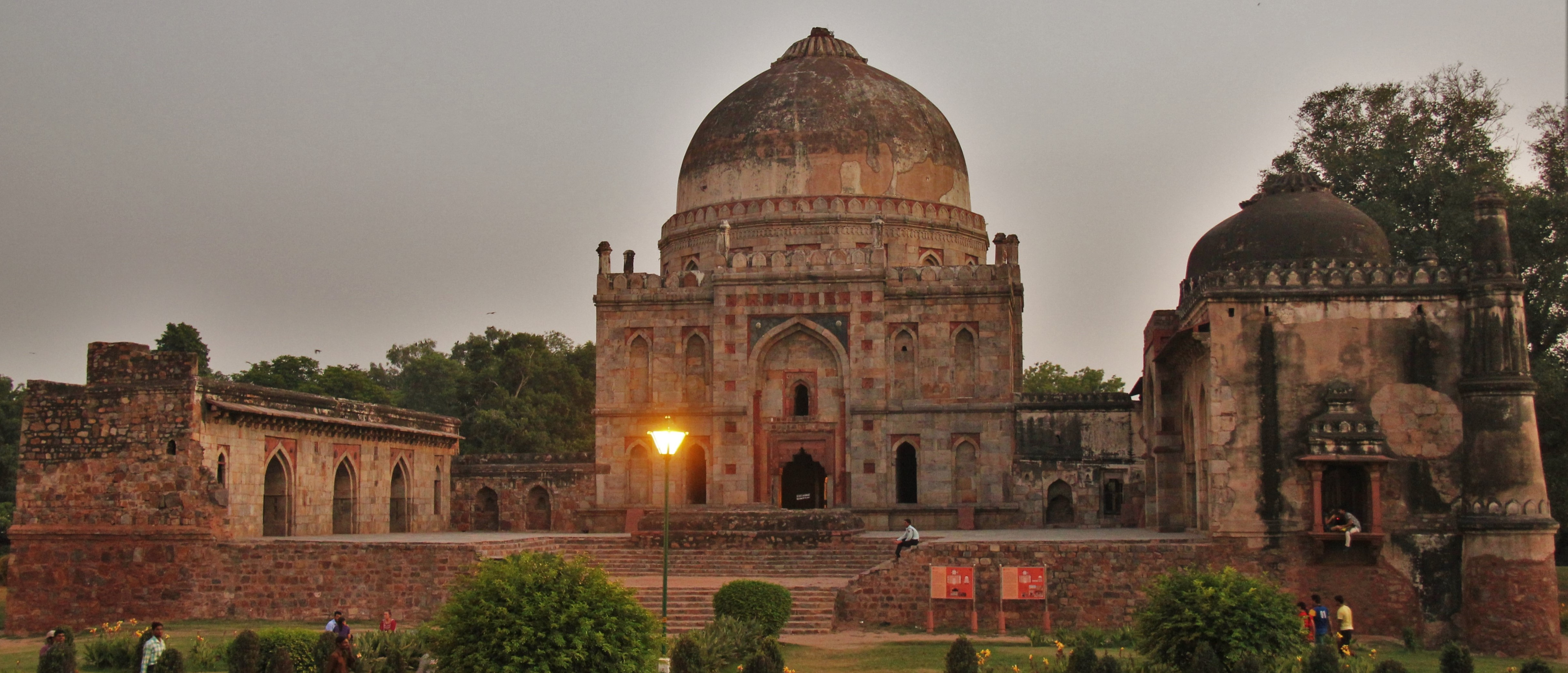
The Bara Gumbad in Lodi Gardens in Delhi, India. Built in 1490 CE, probably by Sikandar Khan, it is believed to have the earliest constructed full dome of any building in Delhi.

=== Religious policy ===
Like their predecessors, the Lodi sultans stylized themselves as the deputies of the Abbasid caliphs, and thus acknowledged the authority of a united caliphate over the Muslim world. They provided cash stipends and granted revenue-free lands (including entire villages) to the Muslim ulama, the Sufi shaikhs, the claimed descendants of Muhammad, and to the members of his Quraysh tribe. The Suhrawardi Sufi, Shaikh Sama' al-Din Kamboh, was the patron saint of Lodi dynasty, and his son Nasir al-Din Dehlawi remained Shaykh al-Islām during the reigns of Sikandar and Ibrahim.

Sikandar Khan Lodi, whose mother was daughter of a Hindu goldsmith, resorted to strong Sunni orthodoxy to prove his Islamic credentials as a political expediency. He destroyed Hindu temples, and under the pressure from the ulama, allowed the execution of a Brahman who declared Hinduism to be as veracious as Islam. He also banned women from visiting the mazars (mausoleums) of Muslim saints, and banned the annual procession of the spear of the legendary Muslim martyr Salar Masud. He also established sharia courts in several towns with significant Muslim population, enabling the qazis to administer the Islamic law to Muslim as well as non-Muslim subjects.

=== Economic policy ===
The Muslim subjects of the Lodis were required to pay the zakat tax for religious merit, and the non-Muslims were required to pay the jizya tax for receiving state protection. In some parts of the Sultanate, the Hindus were required to pay an additional pilgrimage tax. Nevertheless, several Hindu officers formed a part of the Sultanate's revenue administration. The Lodi minted no coins in silver or gold due to lack of these precious metals, and taxes where often paid in kind (usually grain). However their copper coinage, notably the bahluli and the sikandari, did contain a small percentage of silver.

=== Architecture ===
Lodi architecture, based upon that of the earlier dynasties of the Delhi Sultanates, developed an extensive use of domes. The Mosque–Tomb complex of Jamali Kamboh, son-in-law of Sama' al-Din Kamboh and poet laureate of Sikandar Lodi, is considered one of last examples of Lodi-period architecture, although built during transition period to Mughal rule.

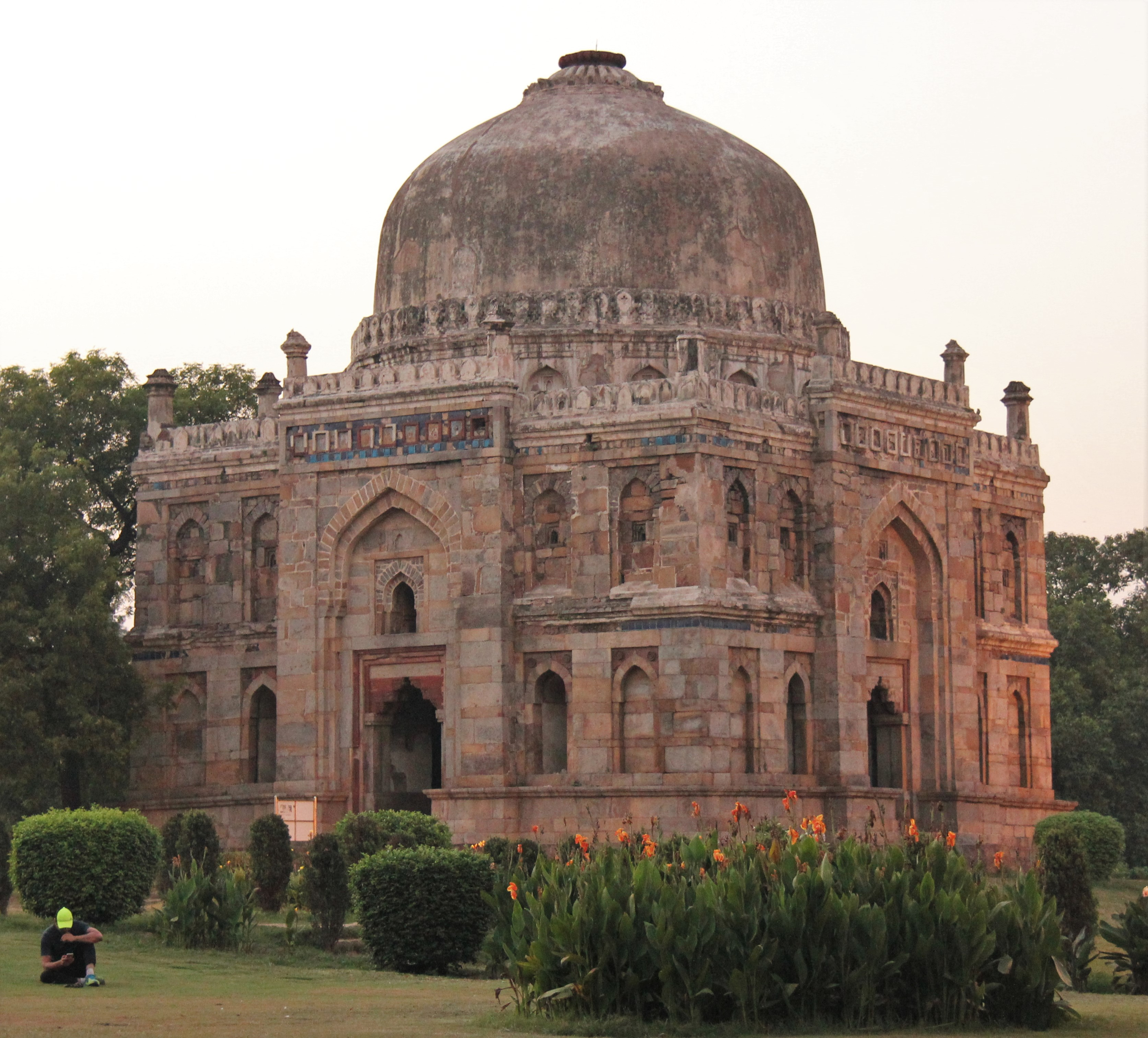
The Shish Gumbad, a tomb from the Lodi dynasty built between 1489 and 1517 CE.

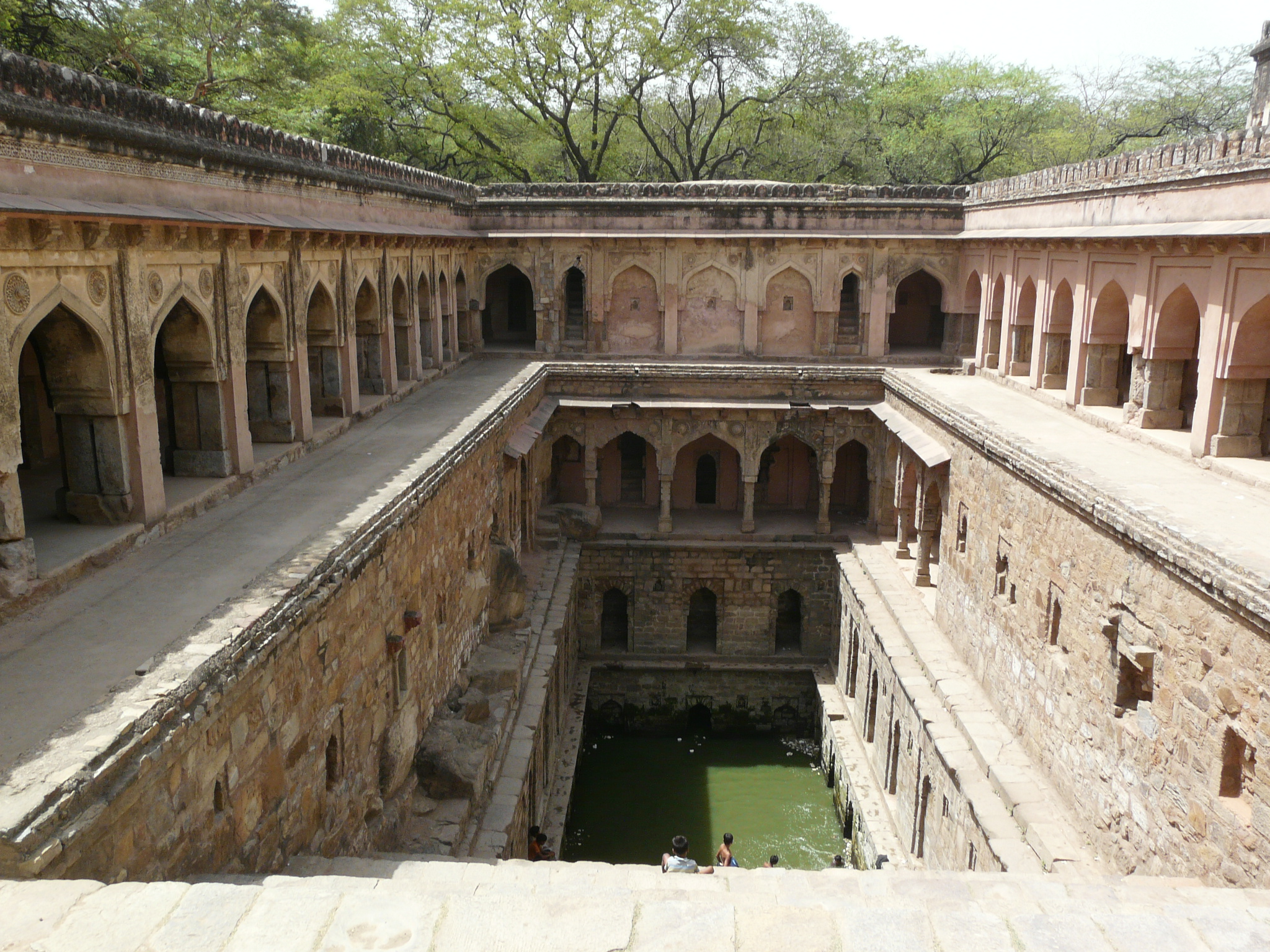
The Rajon ki Baoli stepwell was built by Sikandar Lodi in 1516.

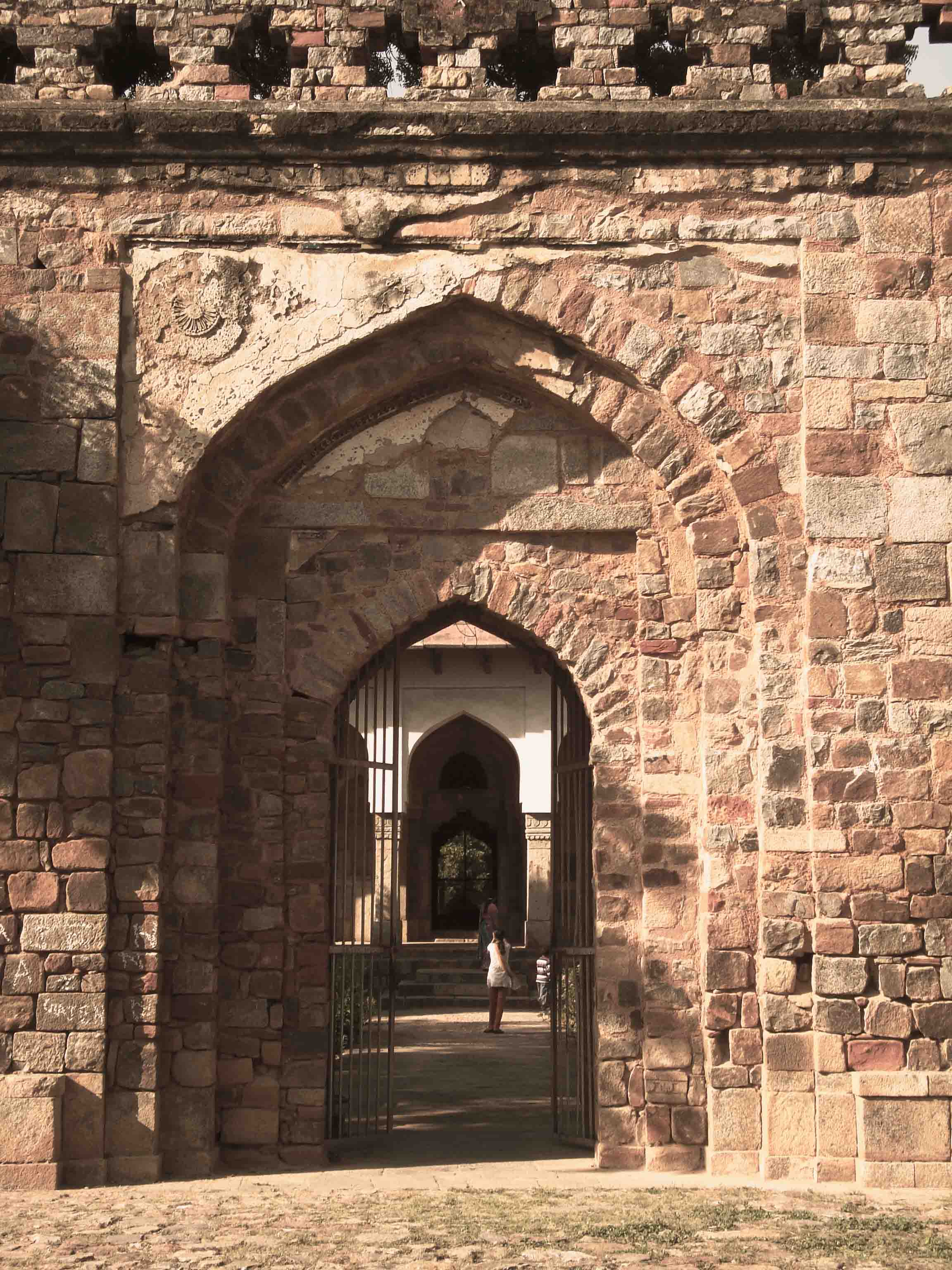
Lodi Gardens tombs

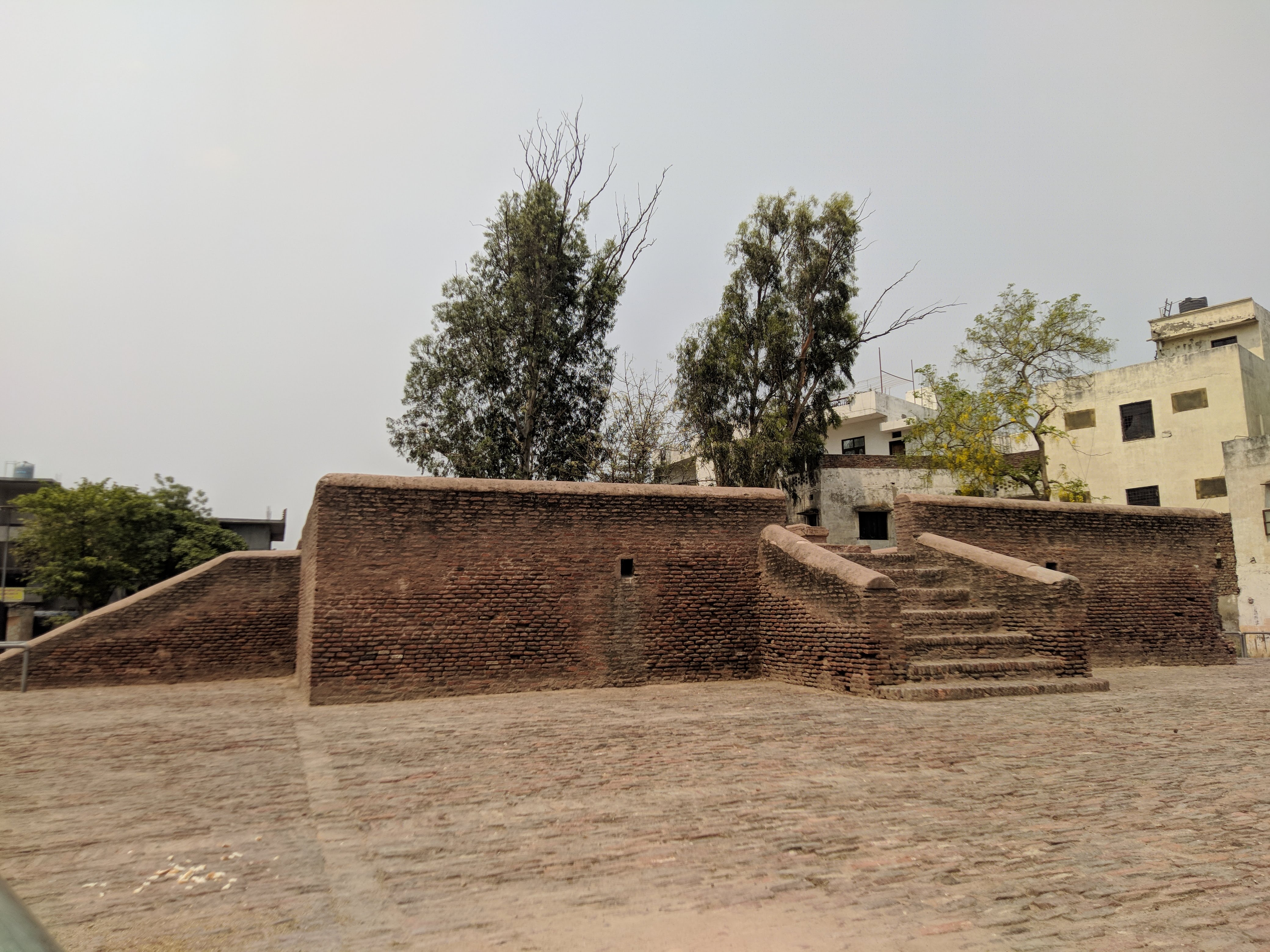
Tomb of Ibrahim Lodi, last ruler of the Lodi dynasty.

== See also ==
- Lodi (Pashtun tribe)
- Lodi Gardens

== Sources ==
- Bosworth, Clifford Edmund (1996). The New Islamic Dynasties. Columbia University Press.
- Dale, Stephen Frederic (2020). "Turks, Turks and türk Turks: Anatolia, Iran and India in Comparative Perspective". In Peacock, A.C.S.; McClary, Richard Piran (eds.). Turkish History and Culture in India: Identity, Art and Transregional Connections. Brill. pp. 74–75. "Persian became, ipso facto, the language of his [Babur's] administration, if for no other reason than that the Lodi Afghans had used it – and definitely not Pushtu – for their revenue records."
- Desoulieres, Alain (1988). "Mughal Diplomacy in Gujarat (1533–1534) in Correia's 'Lendas da India'". Modern Asian Studies. 22 (3): 454. doi:10.1017/s0026749x00009616. JSTOR 312590. S2CID 145789251.
- Grewal, J. S. (1990). The New Cambridge History of India. Vol. II. 3: The Sikhs of the Punjab. Cambridge University Press.
- Haider, Najaf (1996). "Precious Metal Flows and Currency Circulation in the Mughal Empire". Journal of the Economic and Social History of the Orient. 39 (3): 298–364. doi:10.1163/1568520962601180. JSTOR 3632649.
- Hartel, Herbert (1997). "India under the Moghol Empire". In Kissling, H. J.; Barbour, N.; Spuler, Bertold; Trimingham, J. S.; Bagley, F. R. C. (eds.). The Last Great Muslim Empires. Brill. pp. 262–263. ISBN 90-04-02104-3.
- Sharma, Gopinath (1954). Mewar & the Mughal Emperors (1526–1707 A.D.). S.L. Agarwala.
- Subrahmanyam, Sanjay (2000). "A Note on the Rise of Surat in the Sixteenth Century". Journal of the Economic and Social History of the Orient. 43 (1): 23–33. doi:10.1163/156852000511222. JSTOR 3632771.
- Ud-Din, Hameed (January–March 1962). "Historians of Afghan Rule in India". Journal of the American Oriental Society. 82 (1): 44–51. doi:10.2307/595978. JSTOR 595978.
- Owen, Stephen; Pollock, Sheldon (2018). "Sorting out Babel: Literature and Its Changing Language". In Elman, Benjamin; Pollock, Sheldon (eds.). What China and India Once Were: The Pasts That May Shape the Global Future. Columbia University Press. "In the case of the Lodi dynasty that preceded the Mughals, the semi-official language was called Hindavi, an early form of today's Hindi. Persian too was in many ways an elite idiom in its Indian embodiment. Despite pervading much of everyday language in north India at the level of vocabulary (by a process still unclear to scholars; the penetration of the bureaucracy has been suggested), its use was essentially literary, as a code of courtiers and religious professionals; Persian was hardly more of an everyday language than Sanskrit."
