= Aamir Hayat Khan Rokhri =

Pakistani politician

Member of the National Assembly of Pakistan

Personal details
- Born: 12 August 1956 Lahore
- Died: 29 December 2011 (aged 55)
- Party: Pakistan Muslim League (N)

Aamir Hayat Khan Rokhri (12 August 1956 – 29 December 2011) was a Pakistani politician and member of the Punjab Provincial Assembly. He was a Pashtun from the Niazi tribe, a strong political family. His father, Amir Abdullah Khan Rokhri, also was a politician and a political activist from the Mianwali District. He was married to the granddaughter of the second President of Pakistan, Field Marshal Muhammad Ayub Khan. Other prominent family members of his include Gul Hameed Khan Rokhri and Humair Hayat Khan Rokhri.

== Political career ==
Aamir Hayat was born in Lahore on 12 August 1956. He received his education from Aitchison College and FC College in Lahore, Pakistan. Aamir Hayat Khan Rokhri was elected to the National Assembly of Pakistan in 1985 and to the Provincial Assembly as an independent candidate in 1990. He won in the 2002 Pakistani general election on the ticket of Pakistan Muslim League (Q), and in the 2008 Pakistani general election on the ticket of Pakistan Muslim League (N).

== Business and sports activities ==
He controlled the family business, New Khan Transport Service, a transport company founded by his father. He was also the president of the Lahore City Cricket Association until 1985, secretary general of the Pakistan Badminton Federation, president of the Punjab Badminton Association, and a member of the board of directors of the Pakistan Cricket Board (PCB). He promoted cricket and badminton in Pakistan through financial contributions to PCB from 1970 to 1990.

== Death and legacy ==
Aamir Hayat Khan Rokhri died due to a heart attack on 29 December 2011. He is survived by his three children.
