= Abdul Rehman Khan =

Pakistani politician

Member of the Provincial Assembly of the Punjab
- In office 15 August 2018 – 14 January 2023
- Constituency: PP-85 Mianwali-I

Personal details
- Party: PTI (2018-present)

Abdul Rehman Khan is a Pakistani politician who had been a member of the Provincial Assembly of the Punjab from August 2018 till January 2023.

== Early life and education ==
He was born on 14 November 1952 in Isakhel, Pakistan.

He has received Matriculation-level education.

== Political career ==
He was elected to the Provincial Assembly of the Punjab as a candidate of the Pakistan Tehreek-e-Insaf (PTI) from PP-85 Mianwali-I in the 2018 Punjab provincial election.

He ran for re election in the 2024 Punjab provincial election.
