= Jamali Kamali Mosque and Tomb =

Mosque and tomb in Delhi, India

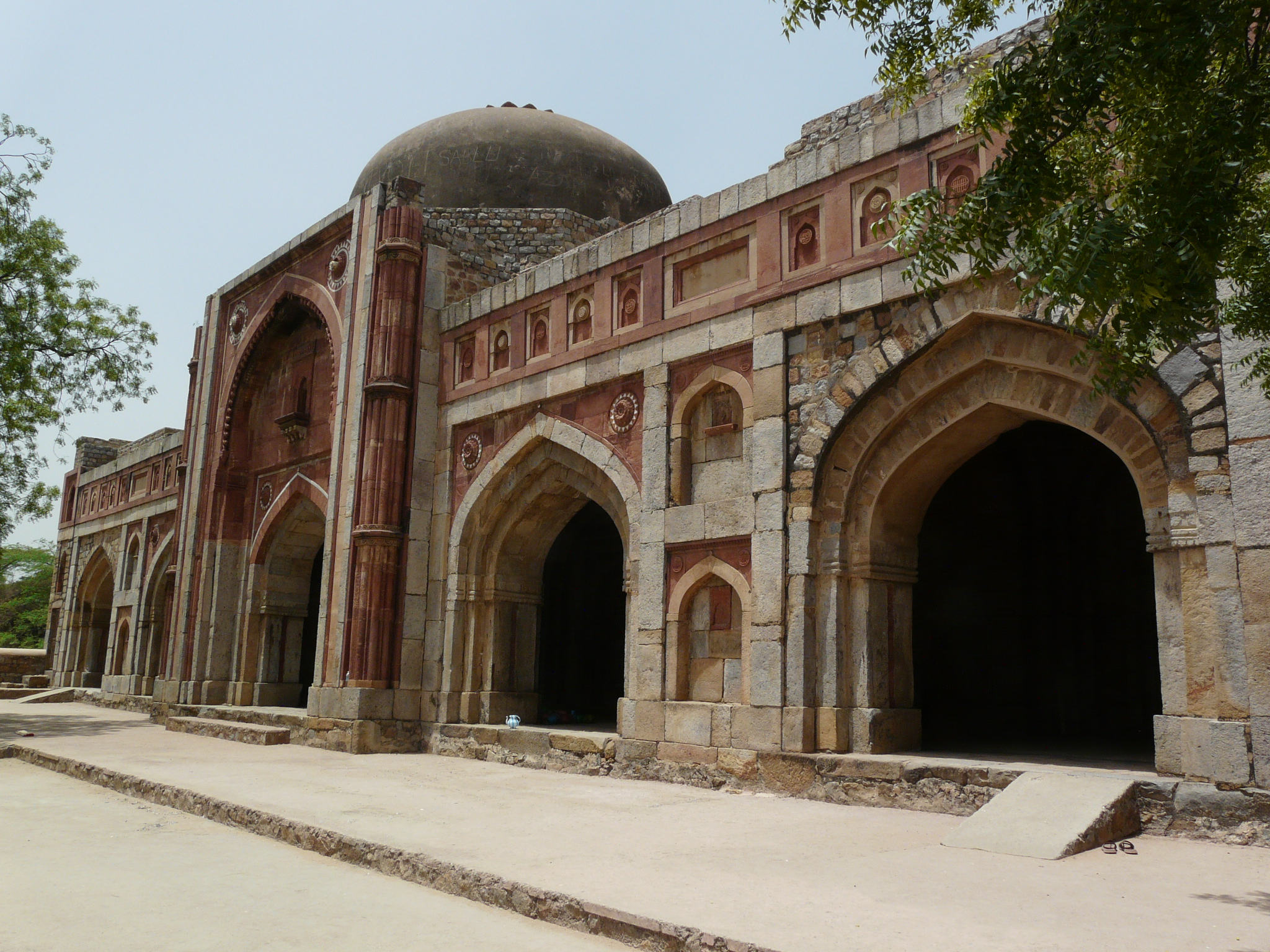
- Entrance to the mosque, in 2009

- Location of the mosque and tomb in Delhi

Religion
- Affiliation: Sunni Islam
- Sect: Sufism
- Ecclesiastical or organisational status: Mosque and mausoleum
- Status: Active
- Dedication: Saint Shaikh Fazlullah (also known as Shaikh Jamali Kamboh)

Location
- Location: Mehrauli Archaeological Park, South Delhi, Delhi NCT
- Country: India
- Administration: Archaeological Survey of India
- Coordinates: 28°33′45″N 77°13′4″E

Architecture
- Type: Mosque architecture
- Style: Mughal
- Founder: Sikander Lodi; Babar; Humayun
- Completed: 1536

Specifications
- Dome: One (mosque only)
- Materials: Red sandstone; marble

Monument of National Importance
- Official name: Jamali Kamali Mosque and Tomb of Maulana Jamali Kamali
- Reference no.: N-DL-95

The Jamali Kamali Mosque and Tomb is a Sufi mosque and mausoleum complex that contains the tombs of Jamali and Kamali, co-located in the archaeological village of Mehrauli, in South Delhi, India. The mosque and the tomb were constructed in c. 1529, and Jamali was buried in the tomb after his death in 1535.

The mosque and tomb structures are Monuments of National Importance, administered by the Archaeological Survey of India.

== Location ==
Mehrauli urban village where the monument is located, is approachable from all parts of Delhi by a well-laid-out roads and transport system. The Indira Gandhi International Airport is 18 km (11 mi) away, and the New Delhi Railway Station and Nizamuddin Railway Station are respectively 17 km (11 mi), and 16 km (9.9 mi) away. The nearest metro station is Qutub Minar.

The practice of Friday prayers is barred in such monuments, classified by the body under the category of "non-living heritage structures".

== History ==
"Jamali" was the alias given to Shaikh Fazlu'llah, also known as Shaikh Jamali Kamboh, a renowned Sufi saint who lived during the period of Lodi dynasty and the Mughal dynasty, a period from the rule of Sikandar Lodi to that of Babur and Humayun.

Jamali was a popular poet who traveled widely around Asia and the Middle East. He became court poet under Lodi dynasty and continued to enjoy the patronage of the Mughal rulers, Babur and his son Humayun. His poetry mirrored Persian mysticism of the times. His two popular works are The Sun and Moon and The Spiritual Journey of the Mystics. It is said that his tomb was completed during Humayun's rule. Kamali, according to oral traditions, is believed to be the male lover of Jamali, though this claim is widely disputed among historians.

== Architecture ==
=== Mosque ===
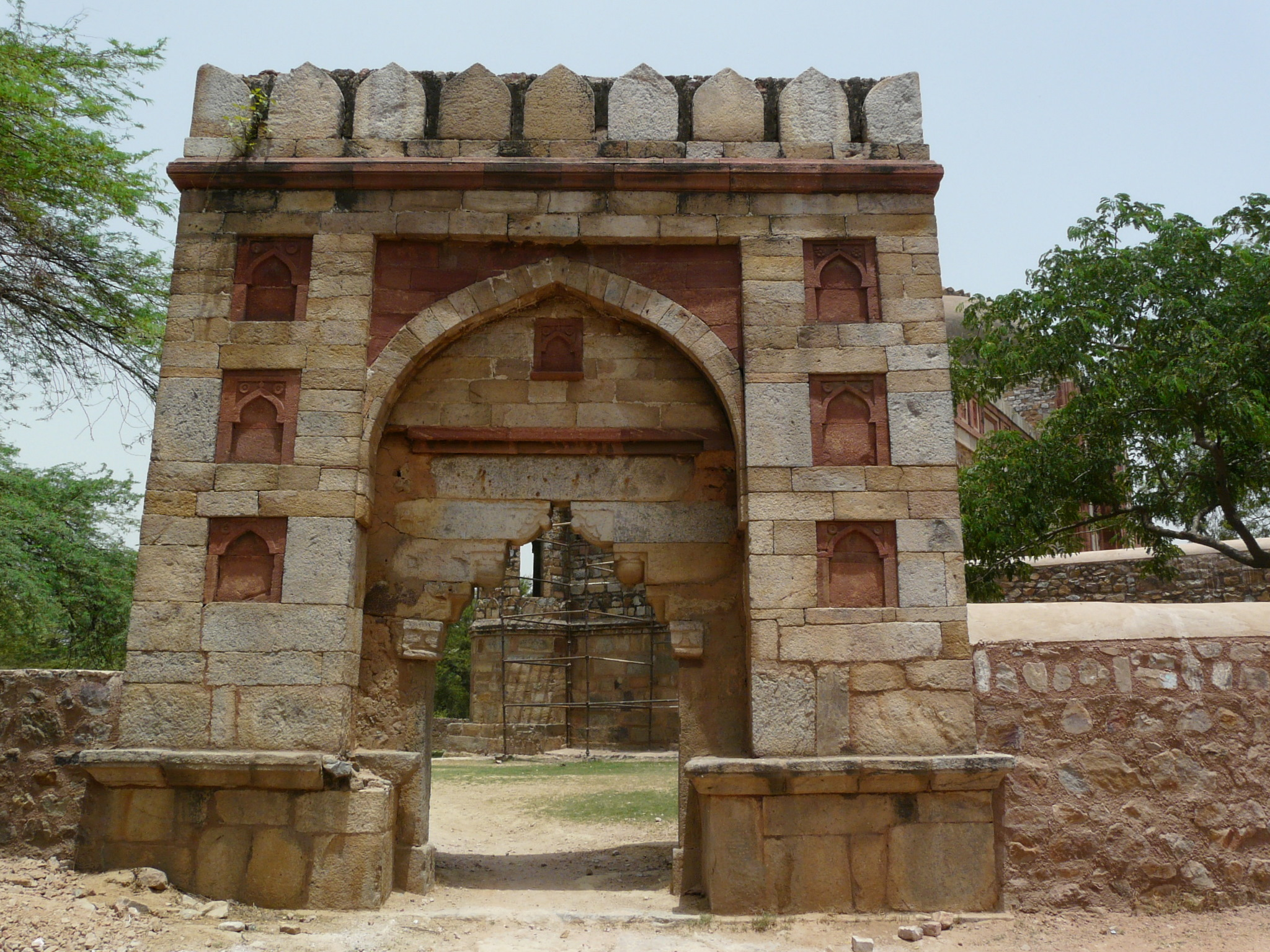
The entrance gate to the mosque from the south

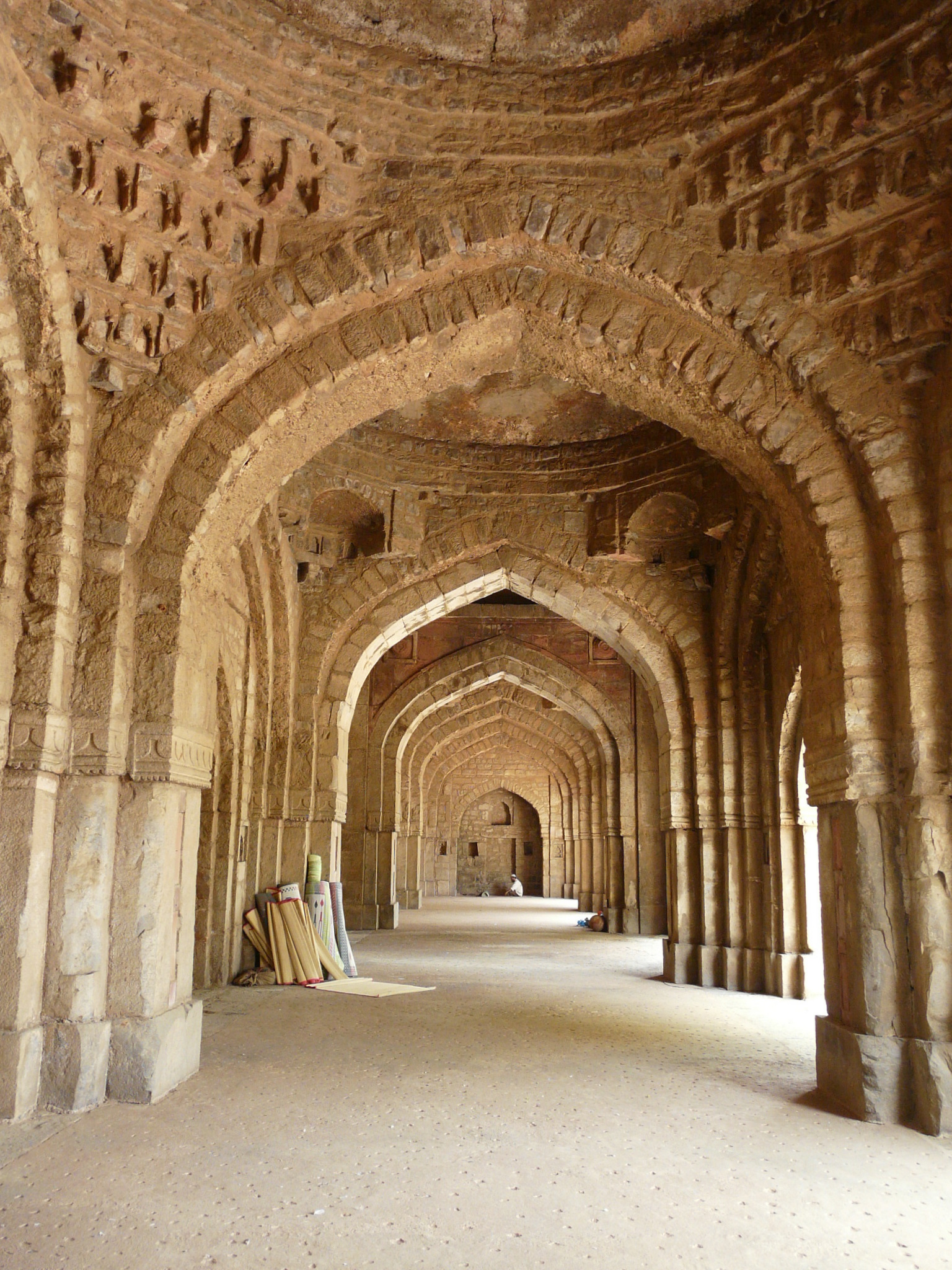
The decorated arcade around the mosque

The Jamali Kamali Mosque, positioned in an enclosed garden area, built first during the years 1528–29, has a southern entry. It is built in red sandstone with marble embellishments. It is claimed to be a forerunner in the design of Mughal mosque architecture in India. The prayer hall, fronted by a large courtyard, has five arches with the central arch only having a dome. The size of arches increases towards the central arch, which is the largest of the five arches embellished with beautiful ornamentation. The spandrels of the arch are decorated with medallions and ornamentation. Fluted pilasters exquisitely decorate the central arch. The prayer wall on the west has niches with mihrab. The niches and walls are decorated with a few Quranic inscriptions. A porch around the mosque provides access to the two storied mosque and the four corners are adorned by octagonal towers. The rear end of the mosque has been provided with oriel windows, apart from a small window on the central arch.

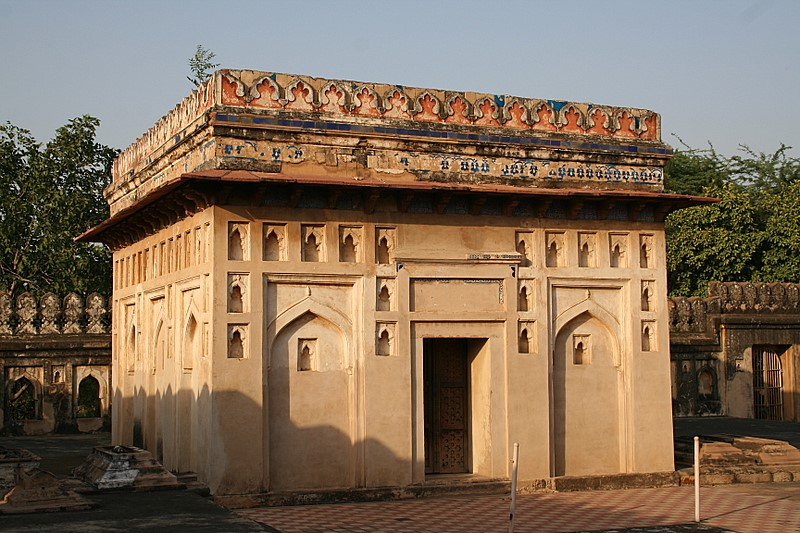
Jamali Kamali tomb façade

=== Tomb ===
The tomb of Jamali-Kamali is a decorated 7.6-metre (25 ft) square structure with a flat roof, located adjacent to the mosque on its northern side. Inside the chamber, the flat ceiling is plastered and ornately decorated. It is painted in red and blue with some Koranic inscriptions, and the walls are adorned with inlaid coloured tiles inscribed with Jamali's poems. The decorations in the tomb have been described as giving the impression of "stepping into a jewel box". In the Jamali Kamali Mosque and Tomb the tomb chamber has two marble graves: one of Jamali, the saint poet and the other of Kamali. The reason for the Kamali name could probably be that it rhymes well with Jamali.

== Conservation ==
The monument is well maintained and provides a very serene atmosphere. In 2012, the Archaeological Survey of India (ASI) completed conservation of the monument, at a cost of ₹1.5 million (US$30,000).

== Gallery ==
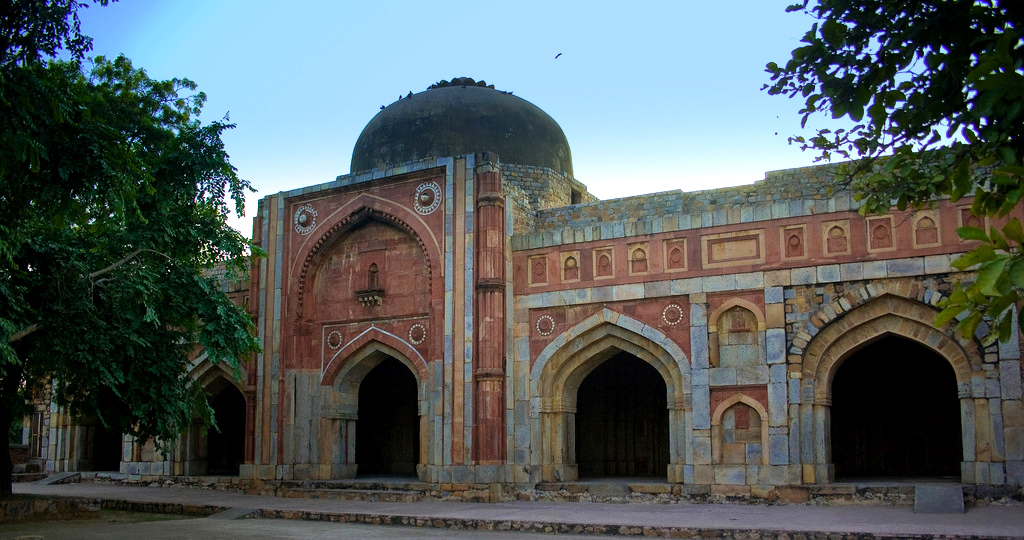
Exterior of the mosque

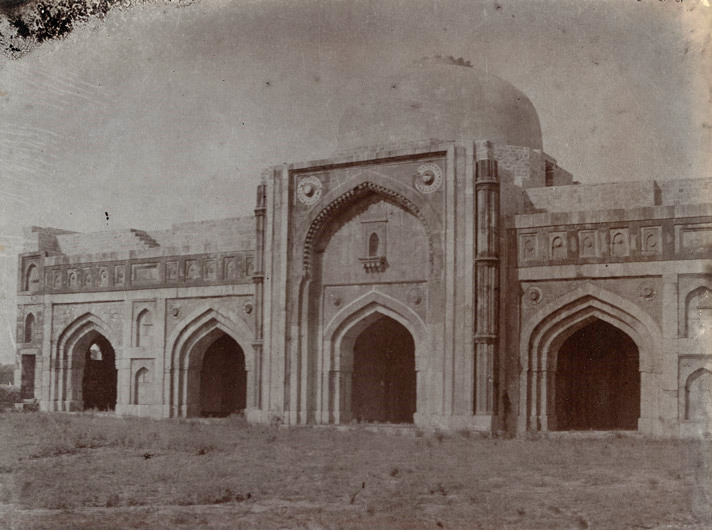
View of the façade, 1885

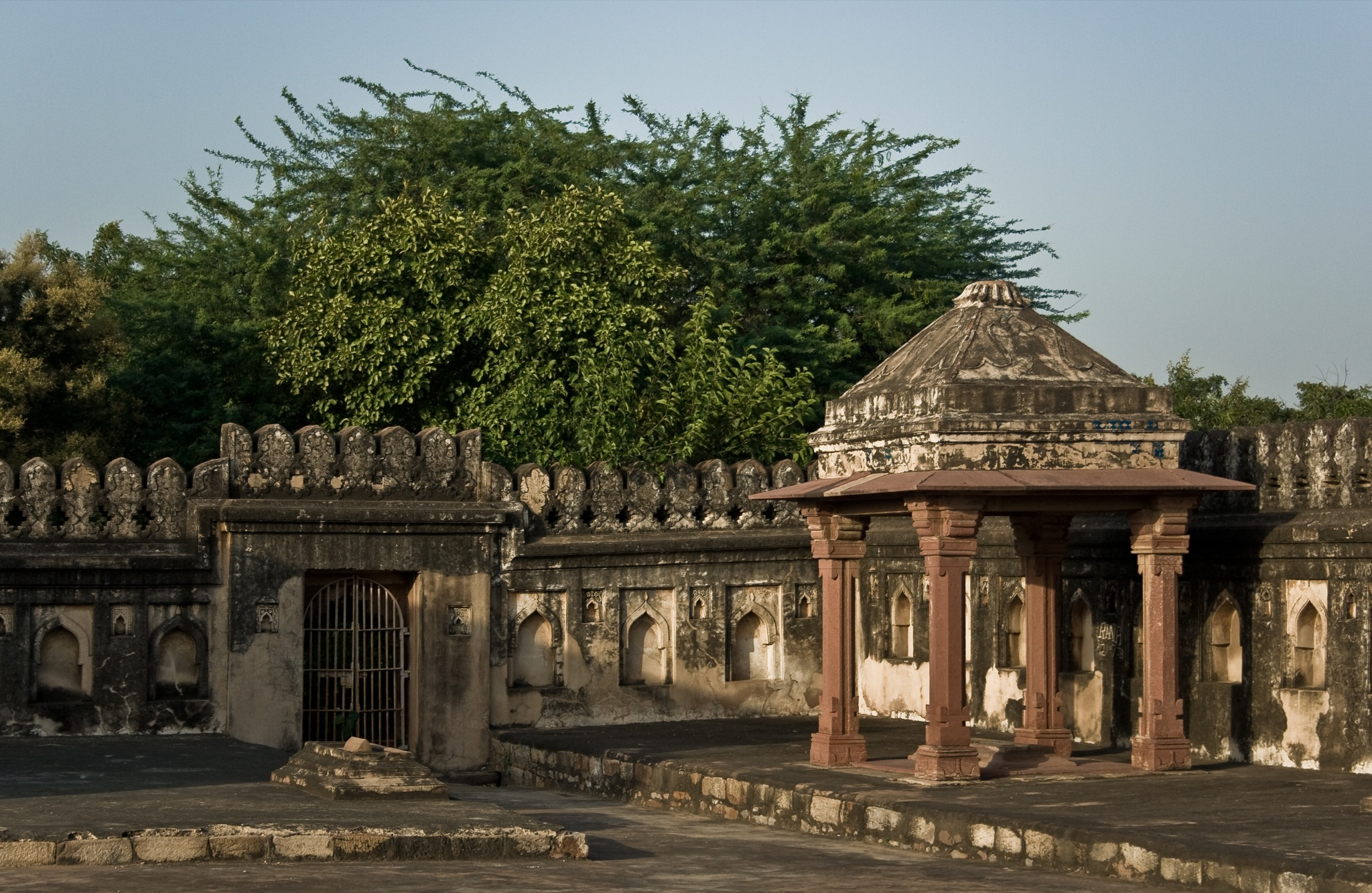
A grave under a pillared pavilion, chhatri, in the courtyard

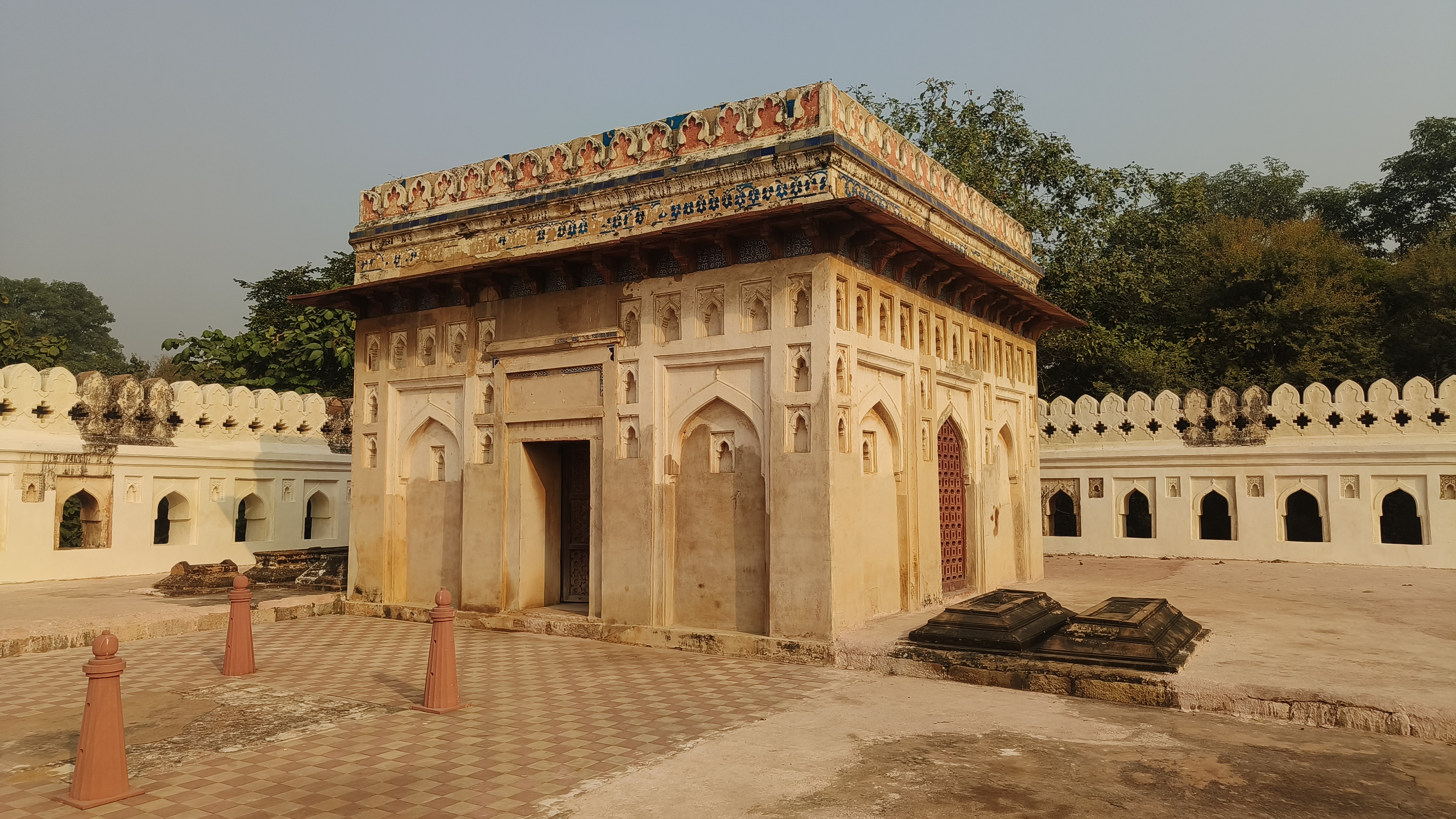
Tomb exterior

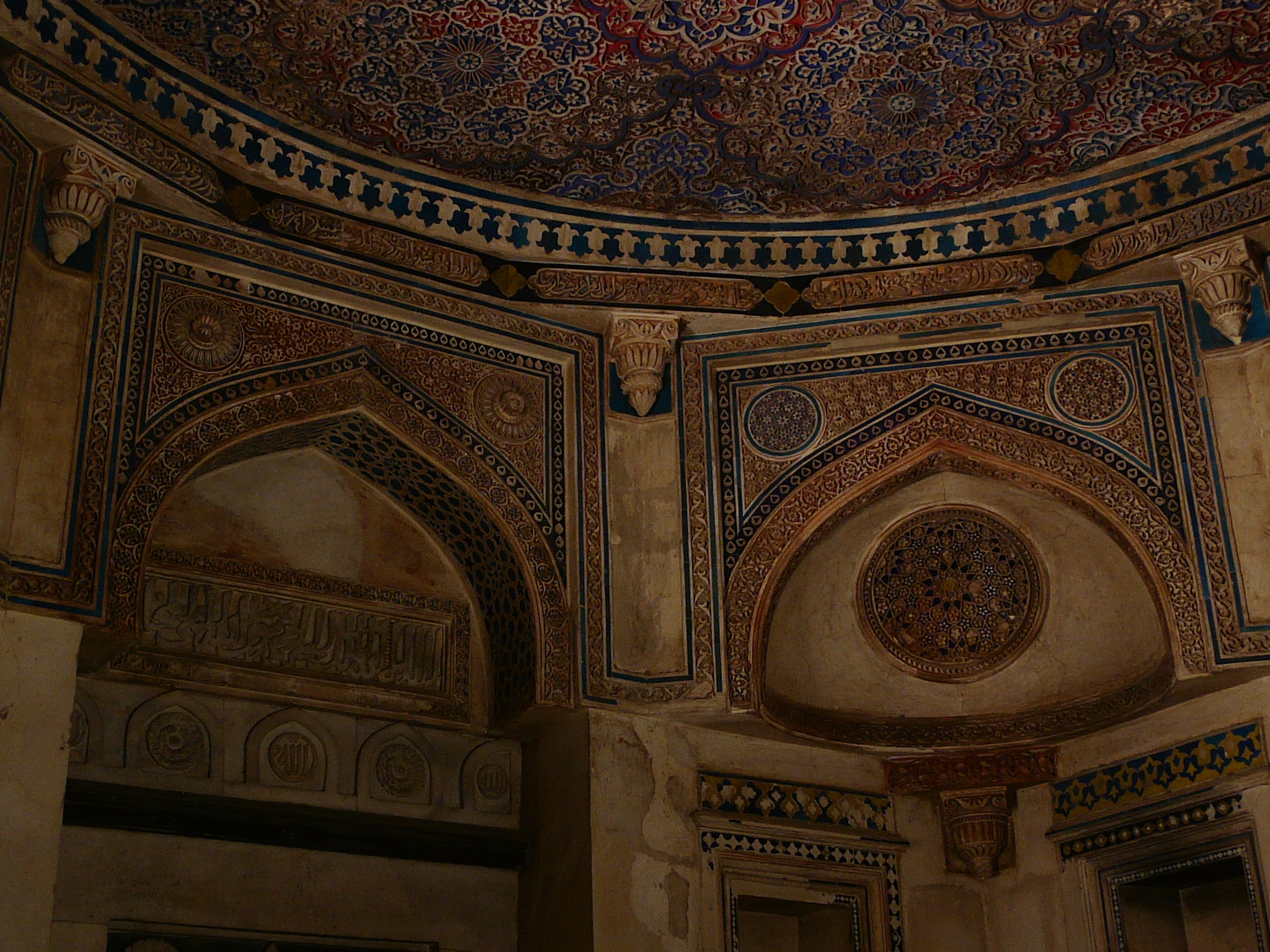
Interior of Jamali Kamali tomb

== See also ==
- Islam in India
- List of mosques in India
- List of Monuments of National Importance in Delhi
