= Shaikh Gadai Kamboh =

Punjabi Sufi saint

Shaikh Gadai Kamboh was a Punjabi Muslim Sufi saint. He was the son, disciple and successor of famous scholar, philosopher and poet-laureate Shaikh Jamali Kamboh of Delhi and brother of the 'Master of Expression' —Shaikh Abd-al-Hai Hayati. His real name was Abdur Rehman but he became famous as Gadai. He was well-renowned for his sanctity and learning and was in high favour with emperor Humayun and Bairam Khan. He is also said to have remained a Musahib of the Afghan emperor Salim Shah Suri. During Akbar’s reign, he occupied the high office of Sadr-i-sadur of Hindustan.

== Early career ==
Shaikh Gadai’s father Shaikh Jamali Kamboh had been an important courtier of the Mughal emperors Babur and Humayun’s court. On Jamali’s death, emperor Humayun appointed Shaikh Gadai as his courtier. But after Humayun's defeat by Sher Shah Suri near Kanawdi in 1540 AD, Shaikh Gadai fled to Gujarat. After the disastrous battle of Kanauj and the consequent troubles, Bairam Khan, an important Turkoman noble of emperor Humayun, took refuge in Gujarat where he was rendered a great help by Shaikh Gadai. It is stated that Bairam Khan had escaped from near Gwalior through the efforts and exertions of Shaikh Gadai and Babbal Khan. Later, Shaikh Gadai went to Mecca in Arabia for the hajj pilgrimage. On his return, he remained in Gujarat for a while where he was joined by his numerous Murids and became famous in Gujarat for his opulent sessions of Sama.

== Shaikh Gadai as Sadr-i-sadur of Hindustan ==
With the restoration of Mughal rule in 1555, the political situation changed and Shaikh Gadai Kamboh re-joined Humayun’s court sometime before his death in March 1556. On Humayun's death, when Khan-i Khana, Bairam Khan became the regent of emperor Akbar, he soon issued a firman appointing Shaikh Gadai to the high office of “Sadr-i-sadur” (Administrator General or Lord Chief Justice) of Emperor Akbar.

The "Sadr-i-sadur" or "Sadr-i-jahan" or "Sadrat-i-mamalik" (Office of Lord Chief Justice and highest religious officer combined) had a very important position as all persecution under the canon law required his sanction and the letters of appointments for the qazis of Subah and Sarkars, muhtasibs, Imams and mutawallis for the stipends and the bills for charitable endowments were issued by him and under his sole authority. He also enjoyed more latitude than others in the matters of selecting king's departmental officers.

The office of "Sadr-i-sadur" had been very important before the Mughals' rule and even during Akbar’s reign, he was ranked the third most powerful officer in the empire. It was his legal edict which legalized the accession of new king. By the time of Akbar the office had however, become corrupt especially so in the administration of grants & pensions and hence after assuming the office, the first thing the Shaikh did was to draw the pen of obliteration through the grants and pensions of the old servants of the Crown in order to control the widespread corruption. Numerous old grantees and pensionees were thus affected by this step including probably also the chronicler Badāʼūnī (a cleric), the author of Muntakhbu-a-Twarikh. Apparently hurt by this drastic administrative action, Badāʼūnī accordingly makes very vitriolic and personal attacks on Shaikh Gadai Kamboh.

Mughal historian `Abd al-Qadir Bada'uni (Abd al-Qādir ibn Mulūk Shāh Badāʼūnī) witnesses that Shaikh Gadai Kamboh achieved the rank of "Sadr-i-sadur" of emperor Akbar and, “for several years, he was resorted to as an authority on the religious questions by the sages and principal men of Hindustan, Khurasan, Transoxians and Iraq “ .

Shaikh Gadai was the right-hand man of Bairam Khan. Bairam Khan never did any political or financial business without consulting the Shaikh. Shaikh Gadai also obtained powers to put his seal on the firmans. He was exempted from the ceremony of homage and in assemblies, he was given precedence over Saiyids and Ulemas. His position was so high that he did not have to dismount the horse when paying respects to the king. Emperor Akbar had a great respect for the Shaikh. Everyone in the Darbar-a-Akbari was required to bow his head and wave his beard to pay obeisance to the emperor, but Shaikh Gadai was an exception. The emperor himself would come to the Shaikh to seek his blessings. Both Bairam Khan and Akbar used to be often present in his house at "Sama" sessions or singing parties.

As "Sadr-i-sadur", Shaikh Gadai had wielded immense powers in the matters of general administration. During Akbar reign, the office of "Sadr-i-sadur" ranked third or fourth in the empire. His powers were immense. He was the highest law officer and had the powers which the Administrators-General have amongst us in modern times; he was in-charge of all lands dedicated to ecclesiastical and benevolent purposes and possessed an almost unlimited authority of conferring such lands independently of the king. He was also the highest ecclesiastical law officer and exercised the powers of High Inquistor

== Mughal Historians's criticism of Shaikh Gadai ==
Mughal historians of Akbar's reign who compiled their works after the fall of Bairam Khan are very critical of Shaikh Gadai and accuse him of arrogance, high-handedness and favoritism in the distribution of land grants and stipends among the Sheikhs, Pirs, Sayyids, Scholars and other deserving persons. So much so, even Akbar complained in his firman to Bairam Khan issued at the time of latter's dismissal that one of his misdeeds was the elevation of Shaikh Gadai to the "Sadarat" in preference to the Sayyids and other Ulemas. However, it was soon later found that these complaints and grievances were concocted by Chughtai Turk nobles to provide young Akbar with a pretext to remove Bairam Khan, a Turkoman, from the power. According to Shaikh Rizk Allah Mushtakt who is the earliest source on this issue, Shaikh Gadai had played a very important role at the beginning of Akbar's reign and Bairam Khan did not transact any political and financial business without consulting him. The dominant orthodox Chughtai Turk nobles who wanted to get rid of Bairam Khan because of him being a Persianized Turk as well as for his Shiite beliefs, always tried to poison Akbar's ears against him. They also got annoyed with Shaikh Gadai Kamboh his right-hand man when he refused to toe their line to join hands with them against Bairam Khan and betray him, in spite of the fact that the Shaikh himself was an orthodox Sunni. It is wrongly stated by some writers that Shaikh Gadai Kamboh was Shia Muslim. "While it appears that Bairam Khan held Shiite beliefs.....Shaikh Gadai was undoubtedly a Sunni and not a Shiite". Badāʼūnī, himself a Sunni, simply reflects extreme Sunni opinions when he makes Shaikh Gadai the special target of his personal attacks. Badāʾūnī plaintively writes: "The honor (Sadr-i-Sadur) thus conferred gave the Shaikh the precedence over the magnates or grandees (akabir) of Hindustan and Khorasan".

== Shaikh's personal attributes ==
He was considered witty, and composed and sang verses in both Persian and Hindustani. He was also a musician whose compositions were well known during Akbar’s reign. Both the Khan-i-Khanan and emperor Akbar used to be present in his house at the Sama sessions (singing parties). Shaikh died in 976 AH (1574/75 CE) at Delhi and was buried inside the tomb of his father, Shaikh Jamali in Mihrawil.
