= Shaikh Sama' al-Din Kamboh =

Shaikh Sama' al-Din Kamboh (died 1495) was a 15th-century Sufi saint of the Suhrawardi order from Multan, Punjab.

== Biography ==
Sama' al-Din Kamboh was born in 1405 CE in Multan, Punjab, and came to Delhi during the reign of Bahlol Lodi (d. 894/1488), becoming the patron saint of the Lodi dynasty. His father Shaikh Fakhrudin was a venerable religious leader of the era. Makhdum Shaikh Sama' al-Din had been the royal spiritual adviser or Pir, first to emperor Sultan Bahlol Lodi, and later to Sikandar Lodi. He commanded greatest respect amongst the Muslim spiritual and religious leaders and was one of the greatest Ulema or Shaikhs of his times.

The mazar of Hazrat Shaikh Sama' al-Din is located in Delhi where the Zubairies of Panipat used to assemble every year for offering al-Fatiha in pre-independence days. Spiritual discipline apart, Shaikh Sama' al-Din was a scholar of traditional sciences and imparted instructions as a professional teacher to a large number of students. One of his famous students who rose to eminence was Shaikh Jamali Kamboh. His son, Shaikh Nasir al-Din Dehlawi, was Shaykh al-Islām of Delhi during the reigns of Sikandar Lodi, Ibrahim Lodi, and Babur.

Shaikh Sama' al-Din was author of (1) a glossary on Iraqi's Lam'at and (2) a tract on Sufism, Miftah ul-Asrar.
