= Gul Hameed Khan Rokhri =

Pakistani politician (1936–2020)

Gul Hameed Khan Rokhri (1 January 1936 – 23 August 2020) was a Pakistani politician. Throughout his political career, he has been a member of the Provincial Assembly, been elected as an MNA, and then later became the Punjab Revenue, Relief & Consolidations Minister. During his career, he also served as an advisor to the Chief Minister. He was also the Chairman of the District Council of Mianwali district having been elected in 2016.

Gul Hameed Khan Rokhri was a Pashtun who came from the well-known Niazi tribe.

His ancestors have a long history in politics. He was the son of Ghulam Haider Khan of Rokhri and the nephew of Amir Abdullah Khan Rokhri. Over the centuries, his family has managed to create one of the strongest and most powerful political dynasties. His son Humair Hayat Khan Rokhri was a former District Nazim of Mianwali, and was a member of the National Assembly from 2008 to 2013. His cousin, the late Aamir Hayat Khan Rokhri was an MPA. His son-in-law, Chaudhry Shafaat Hussain, has been the District Nazim of Gujrat.

He has previously served as the Vice Chairman of the District Council of Mianwali from 1965 to 1969, and was the chairman from 1983 to 1987. He has been elected to the Provincial Assembly six times and was elected as an MNA in the elections of 1990. He also functioned as Advisor to Chief Minister, Nawaz Sharif during 1986–88 and as Minister for Food, Punjab during 1989–90.

In the 2002 general elections, Gul Hameed Khan Rokhri won two seats – PP44, PP45. He vacated PP44 and retained PP45. He was later made the Punjab Revenue, Relief & Consolidations Minister.

Gul Hameed Khan Rokhri died in August 2020.

== See also ==
- List of Niazi people
