= Tarikh-i-Dawudi =

16th-century Persian-language history book

The Tārīkh-i-Dāwūdī (Persian: تاریخِ داوودی) is a 16th-century Persian language document recording the administration of various Pashtun dynasties in South Asia. It was written by a historian named Abdullah. It starts with the Sultan Bahlul Khan Lodi of the Lodi dynasty of Delhi and ends with Sultan Daud Khan Karrani of the Karrani dynasty of Bengal. Information relating to the Afghan Sur dynasty can also be found in the book. Other than these Afghan dynasties, the book also contains poetry as well as a history of the Jaunpur Sultanate. The book is named after, dedicated to and was written at the court of Daud Khan Karrani. It has been translated into English and Urdu in 1969 by Shaikh Abdur Rashid and Iqtidar Husain Siddiqi of the Department of History of the Aligarh Muslim University.

== See also ==
- Tarikh
