= Haibat Khan Niazi =

16th century Pashtun noble and military leader

- هیبت خان نیازی

Governor of Lahore
- In office 1541–1549

Personal details
- Died: 1552 Banihal, Kashmir (present-day, Jammu and Kashmir (union territory), India)
- Nickname: Azam Hamayan

Haibat Khan Niazi (Pashto: هبت خان نیازی) was an Afghan noble and military leader in the Sur Empire. He was one of the most powerful noble of Sher Shah Suri and commanded the Niazi contingent of his army. He is best known for bringing law and order in Multan by defeating the local chieftains, Chakar Rind Baloch and Fetah Khan Jat. Sher Shah Suri granted him the title of Azam Humayun and appointed him governor of Lahore, in 1541.

Due to his conflict with Sher Shah's successor, Islam Shah Suri, Haibat Khan revolted in 1549 but was defeated and forced to seek refuge from the Gakhars. In 1552 he attempted to make inroads into Kashmir but was defeated and killed by the Kashmiri nobles; with his head being sent to Islam Shah.

== Conquest of Kashmir, Multan and Sindh ==
Sher Shah Suri ordered Khan to conquer Multan and Sindh in present-day Pakistan in 1541. The conquest of Multan and Sindh and the restoration of law and order was completed by November, 1543.

== Rebellion and death ==
Islam Shah Suri after his accession directed his efforts towards the eradication of pro Adil Shah nobility including Haibat Khan Niazi and Khawas Khan who in reaction to the excesses committed against Afghan nobles rebelled. The Niazi rebellion intensified as Haibat Khan Niazi declared independence in Lahore. The uprising gained further support with Khawas Khan and Isa Khan Niazi joining from the Kumaun hills. Islam Shah, with Shujaat Khan, marched north and defeated the Niazis at Sambla near Dinkot. Following their defeat, Islam Shah humiliated the Niazis. The Afghans were outraged by the mistreatment of their captured kin, which included systematic indignities. In Punjab, the Niazis, unable to sustain their resistance, sought refuge with the Gakkhars north of Rohtas. Later along with his kin he escaped towards Kashmir where their path was blocked at Banihal by the Kashmiris who captured them and put Haibat Khan Niazi to death along with Shahbaz Khan and Saeed Khan.

== See also ==
- Niazi
- Imran Khan
- Sher Shah Suri
- Khawas Khan Marwat
- Islam Shah Suri
