= Jamali Kamboh =

Shaikh Jamaluddin Kamboh Dehlwi (died 1536), better known as Jamali Kamboh, (Note: Also known as Shaikh Hamid bin Fazlullah, Dervish Jamali Kamboh Dehlwi, Shaikh Jamal-uddin Kamboh Dehlwi and Jalal Khan.) was a 16th-century Sufi saint and poet from Delhi during the Delhi Sultanate and Mughal eras. He was a part of the Suhrawardiyya Order and a pupil of poet Jami and of Shaikh Sama'al-Din Kamboh.

Jamali Kamboh was father of Shaikh Gadai Kamboh. His tomb is situated in the Mehrauli Archeological Park, close to the Qutb Minar in Delhi.

== Biography ==
Jamali came from a Punjabi Muslim Sunni family but was initiated into Sufism by his teacher Shaikh Sama'al-Din Kamboh. He was the tutor of Sultan Sikandar Lodhi and had married the daughter of Shaikh Sama'al-Din Kamboh. He lived at Mehrauli during the reign of Sultan Sikandar Lodhi (reign 1489–1517) and later composed panegyrics to the first of the Mughal emperor, Babur (1483–1530) and his successor Humayun.

Jamali Kamboh was a poet at the court of Sultan Sikandar Lodhi. The Sultan who himself was a poet (he wrote poetry under the pen-name Gulrukh) patronized learning and literary acquisitions and used to show his poetry to Shaikh Jamali for corrections and improvement.

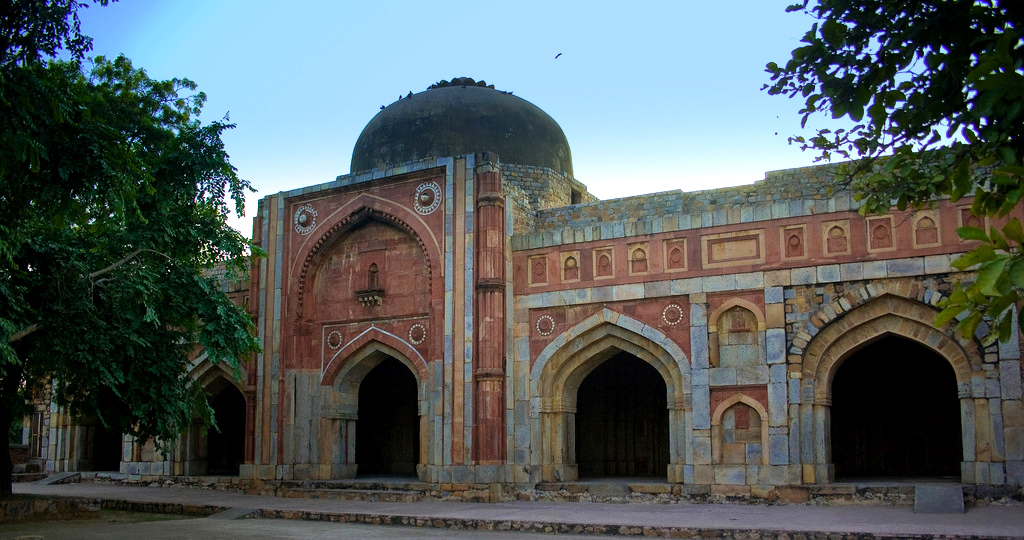
Jamali Kamali Masjid, Mehrauli Archaeological Park

As a poet in Persian, Shaikh Jamali had been styled Khusrau-i-Sani ("Khusrau, the second"). (Note: Note: "Amir Khusrau who flourished during the reign of Alauddin (1295 A.D.–1315 A.D.) was called the "Philip Sidney of the East" (see fn 1, Mirati Sikandari Or, The Mirror of Sikandar, 1899, p. 195).) He wrote Siyar-i-Arifin (completed between 1530 and 1536) in Persian which is an account of the Chishti and Suhrawardi Sufis of the period. He also authored other works called Masnawi, Mihr wa Mähi Shaikh and a Diwan of verses.

Shaikh Jamali had once admonished Sultan Sikandar Lodi for his shaven chins and for his failure to observe the obligatory prayers, fasts and for his mundane indulgences.

He died in 1536 while accompanying the Mughal emperor Humayun in the latter's expedition to Gujarat. His son Shaikh Gadai Kamboh, a scholar and philosopher, was also his disciple and successor.

== Tomb of Jamali Kamali ==
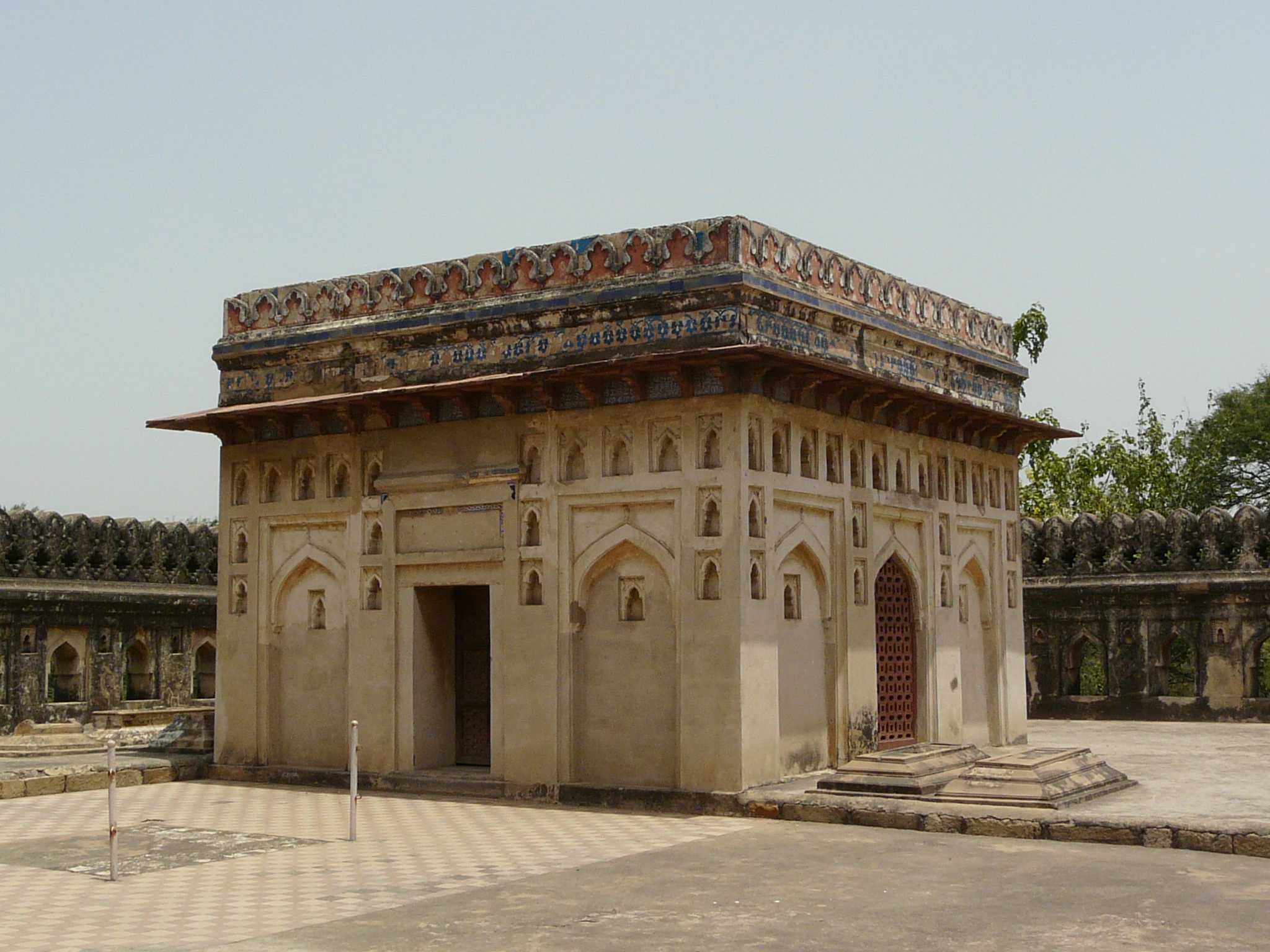
Jamali Kamali tomb, Mehrauli Archeological Park, Delhi

The complex, known as Jamali Kamali Mosque and Tomb, is situated near the Qutab Minar opposite the Ahinsa Sthal on Mehrauli's bypass. The tomb of Jamali-Kamali is situated just near the mosque on north side which has 7.6 m (25 ft) square structure. It is painted in sharp red and blue colours. It contains a few Quranic inscriptions. The inside walls are adorned with inlaid coloured tiles inscribed with Jamali's poems. There are graves of Jamali Kamali built of marble material.
