= Isakhel =

Isakhel عِيسىٰ خيل
- Tehsil

- Location within Punjab, Pakistan Location within Pakistan
- Coordinates: 32°40′29″N 71°16′52″E
- Country: Pakistan
- Region: Punjab
- District: Mianwali District
- Tehsil: Isakhel Tehsil
- Union councils: 1
- Established: 1901

Area
  - Total: 1,760 km^{2} (680 sq mi)
- Elevation: 198 m (650 ft)

Population (2023)
  - Total: 94,541
  - Density: 200.9/km^{2} (520/sq mi)
- Time zone: UTC+5 (PST)
- Postal code: 42430

Isakhel (Pashto: عیسيٰ خيل Saraiki: عِيسىٰ خيل) is a town of Mianwali District in the Punjab province of Pakistan. The town is the headquarters of Isakhel Tehsil, an administrative subdivision of the district.

Isakhel is an important town located in the west of Mianwali District. It is named after Isa Khan, the chief of the Pashtun Niazi tribe. Until November 1901, Isakhel was the tehsil headquarters of Bannu District. However, after the North-West Frontier Province was created from Punjab Province, Bannu District was included in the North-West Frontier Province without the Isakhel Tehsil. Isakhel became part of the newly formed Mianwali District of the Punjab. Isakhel was also the residence of the Khan's from the same family called the sons of Khanzaman Khan Niazi, who used to own substantial agriculture land. After land reforms were implemented by Ayub Khan, substantial land was taken by the government from Khan's.

== History ==
The town of Isakhel is an old settlement with historic importance dated back to 1100 AD. During its tribal years, the town was under the chieftainship of various powerful rulers, mostly from the Malik, Awan, or Niazi tribes. However, the town was reformed in about 1830 by Ahmad Khan, ancestor of the present Khans of Isakhel and it takes its name from Isa Khan Niazi, a religious teacher and noble governor in Sher Shah Suri's court. The municipality was created in 1875. The present Khans of Isakhel still reside there. In 1901, during British rule, when the tehsil became part of Mianwali, the population of the town was 7,630. The income and expenditure during the ten years ending 1902-3, averaged Rs. 4,400. In 1903-4, the income was Rs. 5,100, chiefly derived from octroi; and the expenditure was Rs. 4,600. During that time, a small cattle market was held weekly. The town contained a dispensary and a municipal vernacular middle school.

== Independence ==
The predominantly Muslim population has supported the Muslim League and the Pakistan Movement.
