= Qila Niazi =

Village near the city of Gardez, Paktia Province, Afghanistan

Coordinates: 33°38′37″N 069°12′37″E

Qila Niazi (Pashto: قیلا نیازی) (Niazi Fort, Qalaye Niazi, Niyāzī Kalā, نیازی کلا) is a village located near kabul Afghanistan. It is about 135 kilometres (84 mi) south of Kabul.

It was an ancient fortified area belonging to Niazi tribal chieftains who had married into the Barakzai Dynasty and settled in Paktia Province.

Named after its creators the Khans of Niazi, translated into English the name literally meant "Fort of the Niazis". The area originally housed a mud brick fort. Although Niazis had inhabited the area as far back as 1500 BC it is impossible to determine the date the fort was founded, since available oral evidence is contradictory.

The fort was inhabited until the late 1930s, when the Great Khan Niazi migrated to Pakistan as a result of the political turmoil in Afghanistan, which caused the nation to practically disintegrate into chaos. Today a village inhabited by Niazi tribesmen stands on the grounds of the fort.

Niazi Kala in Pashto (د نيازيو کلا) is the area from the Salih Kheel village and up to Rabat Village of Paktia Gardez. Thousands of Niazi families live in the Qila Noazi. The Niazi which lives in this Qila is divided into Mostiwal, Janakheel, Agarwal, Nazarkhil, Azgharkhil and more. These people are mostly business related and on a very little quantity to political activities. They've fought against British, Russian and US forces. A well-known influential Sufi named Sufi Bismillah Jan Niazi and a tribal leader Malak Nasrullah Jan Niazi were heads of Qila Niazi. They were brothers to one another. This tribe have tribal culture and rules which are implemented by Malakan and Ulama of the Masajids.

In late 2001, U.S. fighter aircraft carried out an airstrike on Qala-i-Niazi. The United States claimed that the area was a base for Taliban and al-Qaeda members. The attack destroyed several houses and caused civilian casualties. According to a United Nations report, 52 civilians were killed, including 25 children and 10 women.

Later, four raids were carried out by American forces on the home of Haji Abdul Rauf Khan Niazi, a prominent tribal elder and influential figure from the same area, in Gardez, while three additional raids were conducted on his home in Khost. During the winter, half of his family would relocate to Khost, while the other half would remain in Gardez.

Over the course of these seven raids, eleven members of Haji Abdul Rauf Khan’s household, including Haji Abdul Rauf Khan himself, were detained.

As Haji Abdul Rauf Khan was a prominent figure in local tribal jirgas and community meetings and had considerable influence in the area. He was known for resolving local disputes, and the door of his hujra (traditional guesthouse/community gathering place) was open to everyone, regardless of their status. Consequently, a number of guests were also detained during these raids.

Among the guests detained were Malik Salah Jan and Mullah Asal Khan, Mullah Asal Khan was a close associate and fellow mujahid of Jalaluddin Haqqani, after the Afghan-Soviet war, he had relocated to Saudi Arabia. During the same period, raids were also conducted on the homes of Haji Imran Niazi and Najibullah Niazi, who was known locally as “Doctor.”

Haji Abdul Rauf Khan Niazi’s son, Mawlawi Sher Ahmad Rohani, مولوي شيراحمد روحاني was an associate of Tajmir Jawadملا تاجمير جواد and was accused of involvement in attacks against American forces, particularly in connection with a major attack against U.S. troops. The attack was organized and planned by Badruddin Haqqani, the brother of Sirajuddin Haqqani, with the support of Tajmir Jawad, and was carried out in the area by Sher Ahmad.

A Taliban informant named Qari Habib al-Rahman قاری حبيب الرحمن ګرديزی, who was serving in the police, had reportedly provided information claiming that dozens of American soldiers were killed in the attack.

American forces from across the southeastern zone would gather at the Halim Kala military base for a large recreational gathering. They would hold a party there, and the attack was reportedly planned and carried out against this gathering, allegedly resulting in the deaths of dozens of American soldiers.

Haji Abdul Rauf Khan Niazi’s brothers were merchants and property dealers, were accused of providing financial support to the Taliban.

During Hamid Karzai and Ashraf Ghani, Haji Abdul Rauf Khan Niazi tried to negotiate with Taliban and Republic government for peace and security. In the government of Ashraf Ghani, Malak Abdul Rauf Khan Niazi inaugurated Loya Jirga of all tribal leaders of Loya Paktia (Paktia, Khost, Logar, Paktika and Ghazni) for peace dialogue at his Hujra.

This was the first commission (Jirga) where all the participants collectively decided that the American forces must leave tha country.

After the jirga, the Americans summoned him to Kabul and Gardez on numerous occasions for questioning.
