= Isa Khan Niazi =

Afghan noble of the Sur Empire

Isa Khan Niazai عیسی خان نیازي
- Born: Isa Khan Niazi; 1453; Delhi Sultanate
- Died: 1548 (aged 94–95); Delhi, Sur Empire
- Children: 8

Isa Khan Niazi (Pashto: عیسی خان نيازي) was an Afghan noble from the courts of Sher Shah Suri and his son Islam Shah Suri, of the Sur Empire, who fought the Mughal Empire.

== Biography ==
Isa Khan Niazi was born in 1453 in present-day Isakhel of Mianwali District in Pakistan and his last brother was born in 1478. He died in Delhi in 1548 at the age of 95. The time of 1451 – 1525 was the golden period for the two brothers. It was the time when Lodis completely dominated the subcontinent (Hindustan). Isa Khan Niazi was a prominent member among the ruling family. He was in the same tribal unit of nobles as Ibrahim Lodi, Sher Shah Suri. Most of these families were attached with the Delhi sultanate. There, a contention arose between Isa Khan Niazi along with his brother Haibat Khan Niazi against Sher Shah Suri which ended in mutiny. Haibat Khan Niazi declared himself independent of Suri Empire in 1548 but he was defeated in the Battle of Ambala when his general betrayed him against Suri forces. Imran Khan, the famous cricketer and politician traces his lineage to Haibat Khan Niazi and Isa Khan Niazi.

== Isa Khan's tomb complex ==
=== Tomb ===
Isa Khan Niazi's tomb was built during his lifetime (ca 1547-48 AD). It is situated near the site of the Mughal Emperor Humayun's Tomb complex in Delhi which was built later (between 1562 and 1571 AD). This octagonal tomb has distinct ornamentation in the form of canopies, glazed tiles and lattice screens, and a deep veranda surrounding it, which is supported by pillars. It stands to the south of the Bu Halima garden at the entrance of the complex. An inscription on a red sandstone slab indicates that the tomb is that of Masnad Ali Isa Khan, son of Umar Khan, the Chief chamberlain, and was built during the reign of Islam Shah Suri, son of Sher Shah, in 1547-48 A.D. On 5 August 2011, restoration work on this tomb led to the discovery of India's oldest sunken garden. Isa Khan’s garden tomb is considered the earliest example of an Indian sunken garden attached to a tomb. This concept was later developed at Akbar’s Tomb and at the Taj Mahal.

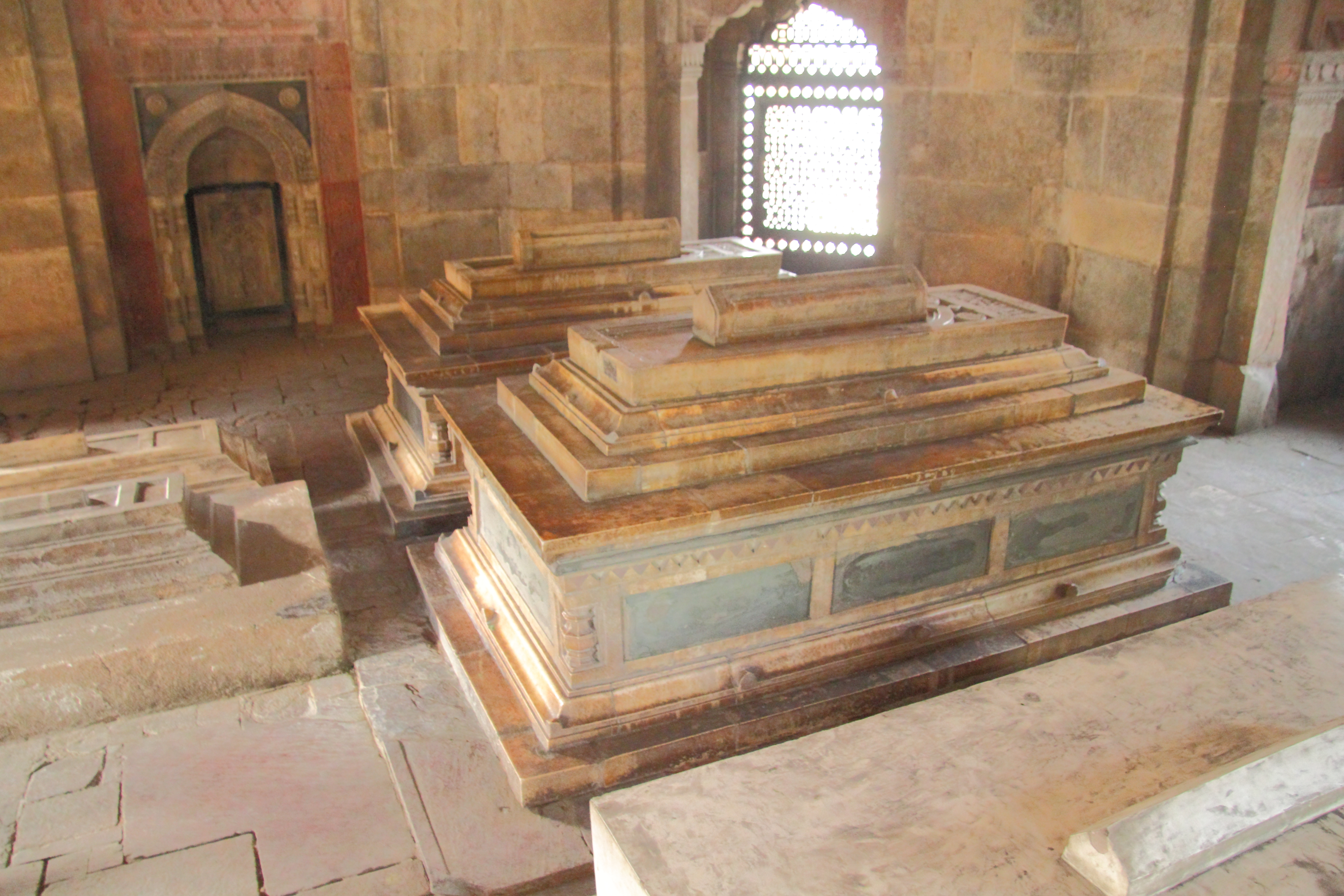
Isa Khan Niyazi's tomb

=== Mosque ===
At the edge of the complex, across from the tomb, lies a mosque with noticeable mihrabs. It is known as Isa Khan's Mosque. It was built at the same time as the tomb. Many of the architectural details present in these structures (such as the tomb being placed in a walled garden enclosure) can be seen evolved to a grander scale in the main Humayun's tomb.

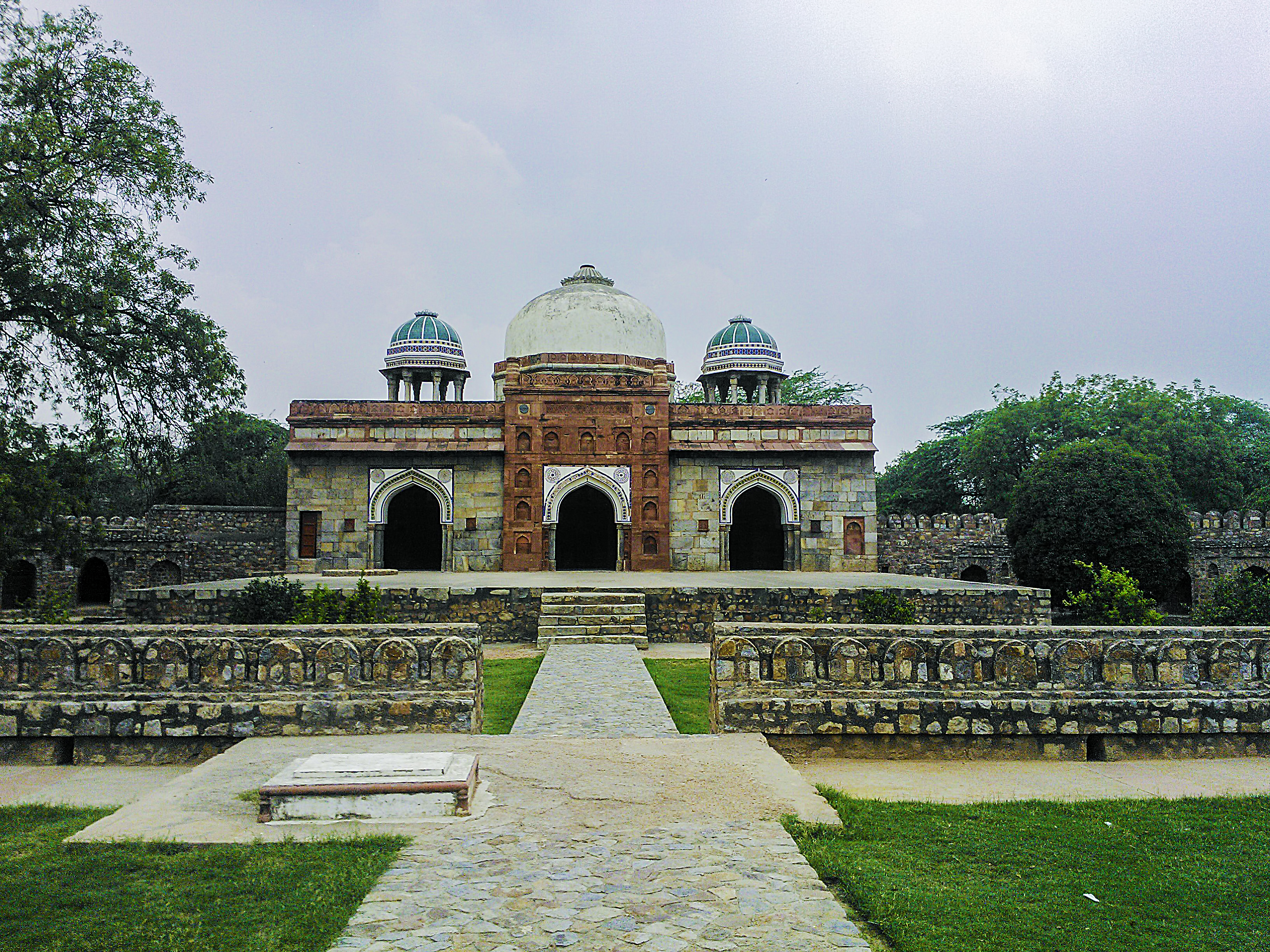
Isa Khan's mosque, across his tomb in the Humayun's Tomb complex.

== Ancestry ==
Isa Khan belonged to a Pashtun tribe, Niazi. His descendants are still living in Qila Niazi, Paktia Province, Afghanistan, and in Isakhel Mianwali district Pakistan, Khawaneen of Isakhel are direct descendants of Isa Khan Niazi. The municipality was created in 1875
