= Humair Hayat Khan Rokhri =

Pakistani politician 1966-2024

Muhammad Humair Hayat Khan Niazi

Personal details
- Born: 20 August 1966 Lahore, Punjab, Pakistan
- Died: 9 September 2024 (aged 58)
- Party: PMLN (1993-2024)
- Children: Jehan Zainab Niazi, Azmeh Fatima Niazi, Amal Zahra Niazi, Khadijah Rania Niazi & Muhammad Ali Akbar Khan Niazi
- Parent(s): Gul Hameed Khan Rokhri, Tahira Niazi
- Relatives: Amir Abdullah Khan Rokhri; Aamir Hayat Khan Rokhri; Chaudhry Shafaat Hussain

Muhammad Humair Hayat Khan Niazi (20 August 1966 – 9 September 2024) was a member of the National Assembly of Pakistan. He defeated a federal minister, Sher Afghan Khan Niazi, in the 2008 elections for the NA-72 (Mianwali II) constituency. He previously served as District Nazim of Mianwali from 2001 to 2005. From 1991 to 1993, he was the chairman of the Zila Council of Mianwali. He was also elected as the youngest sitting chairman at 25.

Humair Hayat Khan comes from a well-known Niazi Pashtun tribe with a strong political background. He is the son of veteran politician Gul Hameed Khan Rokhri, the nephew of Provincial Assembly member Aamir Hayat Khan Rokhri, and the brother-in-law of Chaudhry Shafaat Hussain, a former District Nazim of Gujrat. He has four daughters and one son.

He attended St. Anthony's High School in Lahore and graduated from Government College University there in 1986. He earned his law degree with honours from the University of Reading in England in 1990. In 1991, he passed the Central Superior Services exam but chose to pursue a career in law and politics.

Humair Hayat Khan suffered a severe heart attack near Khushab while returning to Mianwali from Lahore. He was rushed to the nearest hospital, but died on 9 September 2024.

A prominent political figure, he had been elected multiple times as MNA from Mianwali and served as District Nazim and General Secretary of the PML-N Sargodha Division.

He is survived by his 5 children.

== See also ==
- National Assembly of Pakistan
