= Amir Abdullah Khan Rokhri =

Pakistani politician (1916 - 2001)

Personal details
- Born: 10 June 1916 Rokhri, Mianwali District, British India
- Died: 2 December 2001 (aged 85) Lahore, Pakistan
- Party: All-India Muslim League
- Children: Aamir Hayat Khan Rokhri
- Known for: Pakistan Movement activist

Amir Abdullah Khan Rokhri (10 June 1916 – 2 December 2001) was a politician and was actively involved in the Pakistan Movement.

== Early life ==
Amir Abdullah Khan Rokhri belonged to the Niazi tribe in Rokhri, Mianwali District, Punjab, Pakistan. He was also known as Khan Sahib, a title given by the British to him which he abandoned in 1946 on the direction of Muhammad Ali Jinnah.

== Activism ==
He became an active member of the Muslim Students Federation as a student and campaigned for the Pakistan Movement from the Mianwali District.

== Career ==
In the Indian provincial elections, 1946, Amir Abdullah Khan Niazi of Rokhri was elected Member of Legislative Assembly (MLA).

After the independence of Pakistan in 1947, he became the first Chairman of the District Council of Mianwali from 1948 to 1958. He was also elected MPA in 1970 during the Pakistani general election, 1970. In the elections of 1977, Amir Abdullah Khan Rokhri was elected MNA, defeating the candidate of the Pakistan National Alliance, Maulana Abdul Sattar Khan Niazi.

He served in the Senate of Pakistan for two terms, first from 1985 to 1991 and for another six year until 1997 during his second term. His son, Aamir Hayat Khan Rokhri served as an MPA and MNA and his nephew, Gul Hameed Khan Rokhri also served as an MPA, MNA and Punjab Food Minister. Amir Abdullah Rokhri did not only succeed from Mianwali but also from Bhakkar. He was a close friend of Amir Mohammad Khan, Governor of West Pakistan. He was also an intimate friend of Chaudhry Zahoor Elahi and Ayub Khan (his son is married to Ayub's granddaughter). He remained one of the Pakistan Muslim League's loyal workers for a long time.

He was elected to the Legislative Assembly of Pakistani Punjab despite the opposition of figures such as Mian Mumtaz Daultana, Chief Minister of Punjab.

Amir Abdullah Khan Rokhri along with Balakh Sher Mazari, Anwar Ali Noon, Sikandar Hayat Khan, and Sardar Ahmad Ali resigned from the National Assembly when Zulfikar Ali Bhutto jailed their close friend, Chaudhry Zahoor Elahi. Amir Abdullah Khan Rokhri was a close friend of the Pir of Pagaro VII, Balakh Sher Mazari, Colonel Abid Hussain and others. The affection the people of Mianwali had for Amir Abdullah Khan Rokhri was obvious to anyone who attended his funeral. His death was condoled by leaders from every party whereas many leading politicians attended his funeral in his ancestral village of Rokhri including former prime minister Chaudhry Shujaat Hussain, former foreign minister & speaker of National Assembly of Pakistan Gohar Ayub Khan, former federal minister Syeda Abida Hussain and others. Amir Abdullah Khan Rokhri's political influence was greatest in the district of Mianwali and Bhakkar.

== Awards and honours ==
- Tehrik e Pakistan (Pakistan Movement) Award by the Governor of Punjab, Pakistan.
- Gold Medal by the Chief Minister of Punjab, Pakistan for being a senior member of the Independence movement.

== Family ==
He founded the New Khan Transport Company. New Khan Transport is the largest transport company in Pakistan. It introduced luxury air-conditioned buses to Pakistan.

He also wrote an autobiography Mein Aur Mera Pakistan, a book in Urdu-language which presents his personal account of the history of Pakistan.

He leaves behind a son and five daughters. His son Aamir Hayat Khan Rokhri was a MPA and his nephew Gul Hameed Khan Rokhri, is a former MPA, MNA and Punjab Revenue, Relief & Consolidations Minister.
