= Niazi =

Pashtun tribe in Afghanistan and north-west Pakistan

Niāzai
- Ethnicity: Pashtun
- Location: Afghanistan; Pakistan
- Parent tribe: Lodi
- Language: Pashto
- Religion: Islam

Niazi (IPA: [niːˈɑːziː], Pashto: نيازي), also spelled Niyazi and Niyazai, are one of the largest Pashtun tribes that reside in Afghanistan and in northwestern Pakistan.

== Origin ==
The earliest work which provides the details about the origin of Niazis is Makhzani-i-Afghani (1610 AD), written by Naimatullah under the patronage of Khan Jahan Lodi, an Afghan noble of Mughal emperor Jahangir. Makhzan-i Afghani gives the genealogy of Niazi tribe as:

To Lodi, God Almighty gave three sons, Niazi, Siani, and Dotani.
Niazi had three sons, Bahi, Jam, Khaku.
Jam had seven sons, Bandar, Sambal, Khankhail, Doulatkhail, Isakhail, Marhil, and Haiki.
Marhil had two sons, Hamim and Naili.
Khaku had five sons, Isa, Musa, Mahyar, Khidar.
Isa had two sons, Ala and Gondi.
Ala had two sons, Sud and Saharangh.
Sud had two sons, Jam and Suri. Jam had two sons, Naiku and Michan.

== Notable people with the surname ==
- Abdul Manan Niazi, former Taliban commander
- Abdul Sattar Khan Niazi, Pakistani politician and religious figure
- Amir Abdullah Khan Niazi, Pakistani army general and former Military Governor of East Pakistan
- Amir Abdullah Khan Rokhri, Pakistani politician and activist
- Amjad Khan Niazi, Pakistani admiral
- Attaullah Khan Esakhelvi, Pakistani folk singer and politician
- Abdul Majeed Khan Niazi, Pakistani Politician
- Fazal Niazai, Afghan cricketer
- Gholam Mohammad Niazi, Afghan politician and religious figure
- Ghulam Akbar Khan Niazi, Pakistani-born Saudi Arabian physician
- Ghulam Hazrat Niazi, Afghan footballer
- Gul Hameed Khan Rokhri, Pakistani politician
- Haibat Khan Niazi, senior military commander of Sher Shah Sur, Governor of Lahore (1541–1549)
- Humair Hayat Khan Rokhri, Pakistani politician
- Ikramullah Khan Niazi, Pakistani civil engineer and the father of Imran Khan
- Imran Ahsan Khan Nyazee, Pakistani academic and author
- Imran Khan, ex-cricketer and former prime minister of Pakistan
- Isa Khan Niazi, Afghan nobleman
- Karamat Rahman Niazi, Pakistani admiral
- Kausar Niazi, Pakistani politician and religious leader
- Mansoor Aslam Khan Niazi (Sami Khan), Pakistani film and television actor
- Misbah-ul-Haq Khan Niazi, Pakistani cricketer
- Muhammad Ayaz Niazi, Afghan Islamic scholar, khatib, and imam
- Munir Niazi, Pakistani poet
- Naheed Niazi, Pakistani playback singer
- Niyazi (Niyazi Zulfugar oghlu Taghizade Hajibeyov), Soviet and Azerbaijani conductor and composer
- Amil Niazi, Canadian writer
- Saifora Niazi, member of parliament of Afghanistan
- Saifullah Niazi, Pakistani politician
- Salma Niazi, Afghan journalist
- Shadab Khan, Pakistani cricketer
- Sher Afgan Niazi, Pakistani politician (MNA) during Benazir and Musharaf eras

== See also ==
- Bettani
- Lohani
- Qila Niazi
- Mianwali District
