= Sher Afgan Niazi =

Pakistani politician

Sher Afgan Khan Niazi (Urdu: شیر افگن خان نیازی; died 11 October 2012) was a Pakistani politician. He served as Minister of Parliamentary Affairs of Pakistan.

AK Niazi or General Niazi was his real uncle.He was elected for a fourth time to National Assembly in 2002 as a member of Pakistan Peoples Party (Parliamentarians), but later shifted his loyalty to become PPPP (Patriot) and then joined the Pakistan Muslim League (Q). Sher Afgan Niazi helped President of Pakistan Pervez Musharraf to oust, detain and then replace the judges of the Supreme Court in 2007 and also supported Musharraf regime's military operation at Lal Masjid, Islamabad. On 18 February 2008, he lost the general election to an independent candidate, Humair Hayat Khan Rokhri. On April 8, 2008 he was pelted with rotten eggs and attacked in Lahore, Punjab by the lawyers protesting against his support for dismissing of Supreme Court judges and Lal Masjid operation. That attack was strongly protested for days in his home town.

Niazi joined President Pervez Musharraf's newly formed political party, the All Pakistan Muslim League (APML). However, he later resigned from the party following differences with the leadership. He was expert in constitutional affairs and had strong command over constitution of Pakistan. He completed his M.B.B.S degree from Nishtar Medical College, Multan, Punjab.

Niazi was famous for memorizing all the articles of the Constitution of Pakistan. His health deteriorated slowly after one of his sons died in car accident in Rawalpindi, and he was diagnosed with liver cancer in 2012.
