= Rikhi =

Village in Punjab, Pakistan

Coordinates: 32°42′N 71°47′E

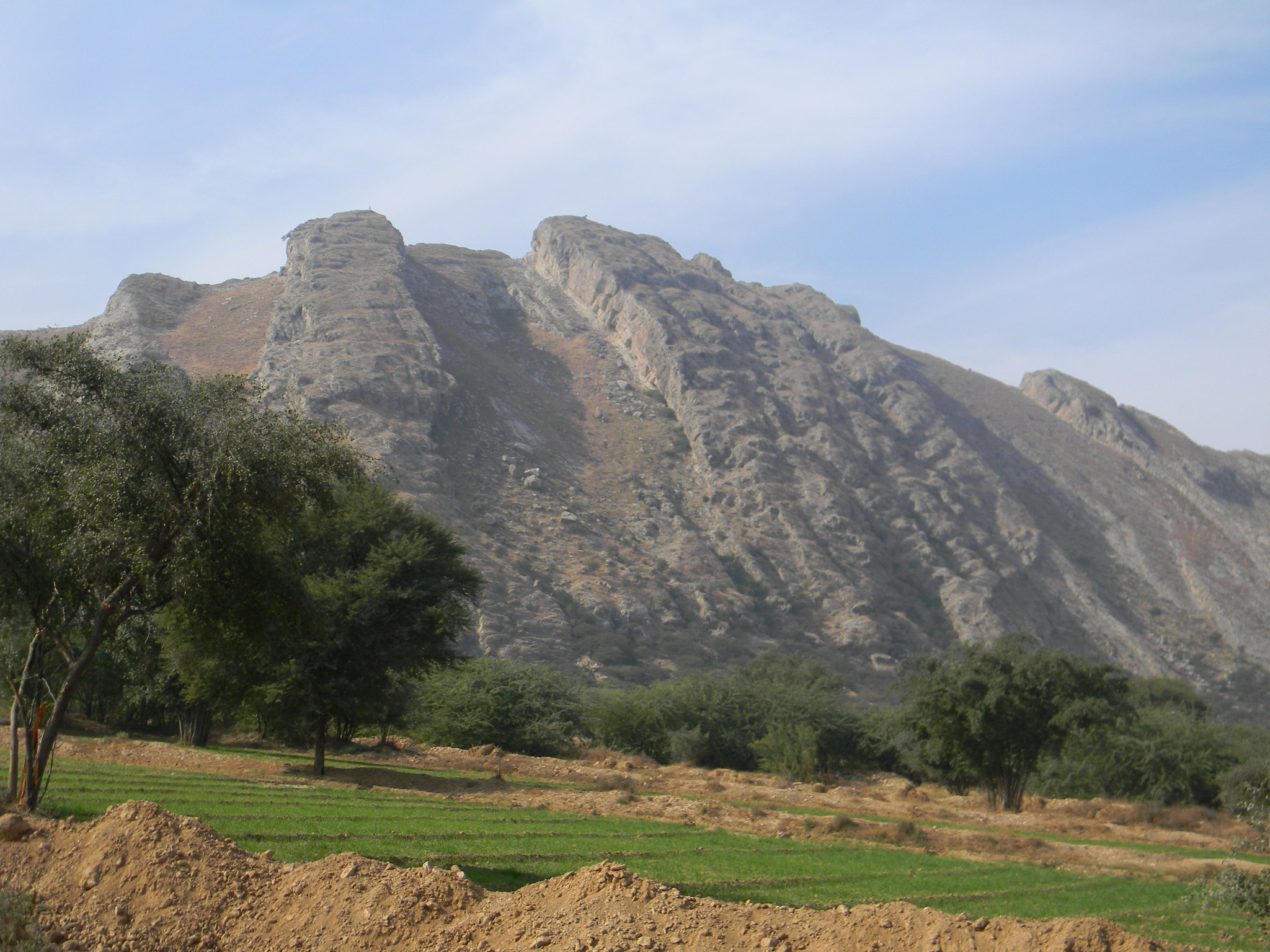
Rikhi Village Namal Valley Mianwali

Rikhi (رِکھی) is a village of Punjab, Pakistan, situated on Mianwali-Rawalpindi road, on the northern side of Namal Lake. Rikhi is at a distance of 32 kilometers from Mianwali city. The name Rikhi originated from the name of Mountain Stream Rikhi which starts from salt range usually during rainy season and coming down, passing through village rikhi and then it goes to Namal lake. Previously it was called Trikhi (Local Language word) meaning Fast Due to its Fast flow. But Later on, it changed from Trikhi to Rikhi. The people started living in Rikhi area after Shifting of population of Nammal Village. The nammal village was exactly at same place where now Nammal lake exist. During British rule, in 1913 when nammal lake was given shape of Lake and nammal Dam was Constructed, then people living there shifted to surrounding areas like Rikhi, Kalri etc. This village is part of Moza Kalri. Rikhi is part of Union Council Thamewali. Police station for Rikhi is in Chakrala. Historical Nala Rikhi (Seasonal Mountain Stream) still flows in the mid of the Rikhi Village during Rainy Season and enhances the beauty of the village.

Population predominantly belongs to the Sighaal, Latifaal, Sahuwaal clans of the Awan tribe. Further Sub classification of clans is also there. So known clans of Awan Tribe are Atral, Charagh Khel, Mastay Khel, Torey khel, Seelu, Dhukki, Babery Khel, Yar khel etc. However, Nasiri Khel clan residing at Rikhi belongs to Khokhar tribe. Naru family living in Rikhi came from surrounding area like MusaKhel.Syed family also live in Rikhi. Most of the people of this village are linked with goods transport business and Majority of people of this village are settled in different cities of Pakistan like Karachi, Lahore etc. The village is situated at northern bank of Nammal Lake. Namal Institute set up by Imran Khan is also situated near this village.

== See also ==
- Sighaal Awan
- Kalri (Mianwali District)
- Namal Valley
- Namal College
