= Kalri =

Kalri may refer to:

- Kalri Lake, also known as Keenjhar Lake, situated in Sindh, Pakistan
- Kalri (Bhimber District), a village in Bhimber District, Azad Kashmir, Pakistan
- Kalri (Mianwali District), a village in Mianwali District, Punjab, Pakistan
- Kalri Jagir a village in Karnal, Haryana, India
- Kalri (Chiniot District), formerly known as Kul Kalri, a village in Chiniot District on the bank of Chenab River, Punjab, Pakistan
