= Namal (disambiguation) =

Namal is a town in Punjab, Pakistan.

Namal may also refer to:

== Places ==
- Namal Lake, a lake in Punjab, Pakistan
- Namal railway station, the railway station in the town of Namal

== People ==
- M. D. Namal Karunaratne, Sri Lankan politician
- Özgü Namal (born 1978), Turkish actress
- Namal Rajapaksa (born 1986), Sri Lankan politician
- Namal Udugama (born 1967), Sri Lankan singer, composer and songwriter

== See also ==
- Operation Namal
- Nammal (disambiguation)
