= Nammal (disambiguation) =

Nammal is a 2002 Indian Malayalam-language film.

Nammal may also refer to:

- Nammal, Khyber Pakhtunkhwa, a town in Abbottabad District, Khyber Pakhtunkhwa, Pakistan
- Namal, a town in Mianwali District, Punjab, Pakistan
  - Nammal Lake
  - Nammal railway station

== See also ==
- Namal (disambiguation)
