= Symmetry set =

Method for representing the local symmetries of a curve

An ellipse (red), its evolute (blue), and its symmetry set (green and yellow). the medial axis is just the green portion of the symmetry set. One bi-tangent circle is shown.

In geometry, the symmetry set is a method for representing the local symmetries of a curve, and can be used as a method for representing the shape of objects by finding the topological skeleton. The medial axis, a subset of the symmetry set is a set of curves which roughly run along the middle of an object.

== In 2 dimensions ==
Let $I \subseteq \mathbb{R}$ be an open interval, and $\gamma : I \to \mathbb{R}^2$ be a parametrisation of a smooth plane curve.

The symmetry set of $\gamma (I) \subset \mathbb{R}^2$ is defined to be the closure of the set of centres of circles tangent to the curve at at least two distinct points (bitangent circles).

The symmetry set will have endpoints corresponding to vertices of the curve. Such points will lie at cusp of the evolute. At such points the curve will have 4-point contact with the circle.

== In n dimensions ==
For a smooth manifold of dimension $m$ in $\mathbb{R}^n$ (clearly we need $m < n$). The symmetry set of the manifold is the closure of the centres of hyperspheres tangent to the manifold in at least two distinct places.

== As a bifurcation set ==
Let $U \subseteq \mathbb{R}^m$ be an open simply connected domain and $(u_1\ldots,u_m) := \underline{u} \in U$. Let $\underline{X} : U \to \R^n$ be a parametrisation of a smooth piece of manifold. We may define a $n$ parameter family of functions on the curve, namely

$$F : \mathbb{R}^n \times U \to \mathbb{R} \ , \quad \mbox{where} \quad F(\underline{x},\underline{u}) = (\underline{x} - \underline{X}) \cdot (\underline{x} - \underline{X}) \ .$$

This family is called the family of distance squared functions. This is because for a fixed $\underline{x}_0 \in \mathbb{R}^n$ the value of $F(\underline{x}_0,\underline{u})$ is the square of the distance from $\underline{x}_0$ to $\underline{X}$ at $\underline{X}(u_1\ldots,u_m).$

The symmetry set is then the bifurcation set of the family of distance squared functions. I.e. it is the set of $\underline{x} \in \R^n$ such that $F(\underline{x},-)$ has a repeated singularity for some $\underline{u} \in U.$

By a repeated singularity, we mean that the jacobian matrix is singular. Since we have a family of functions, this is equivalent to $\mathcal{r} F = \underline{0}$.

The symmetry set is then the set of $\underline{x} \in \mathbb{R}^n$ such that there exist $(\underline{u}_1, \underline{u}_2) \in U \times U$ with $\underline{u}_1 \neq \underline{u}_2$, and

$$\mathcal{r} F(\underline{x},\underline{u}_1) = \mathcal{r} F(\underline{x},\underline{u}_2) = \underline{0}$$

together with the limiting points of this set.
