= 1ES 1011+496 =

BL Lacertae object in the constellation Ursa Major

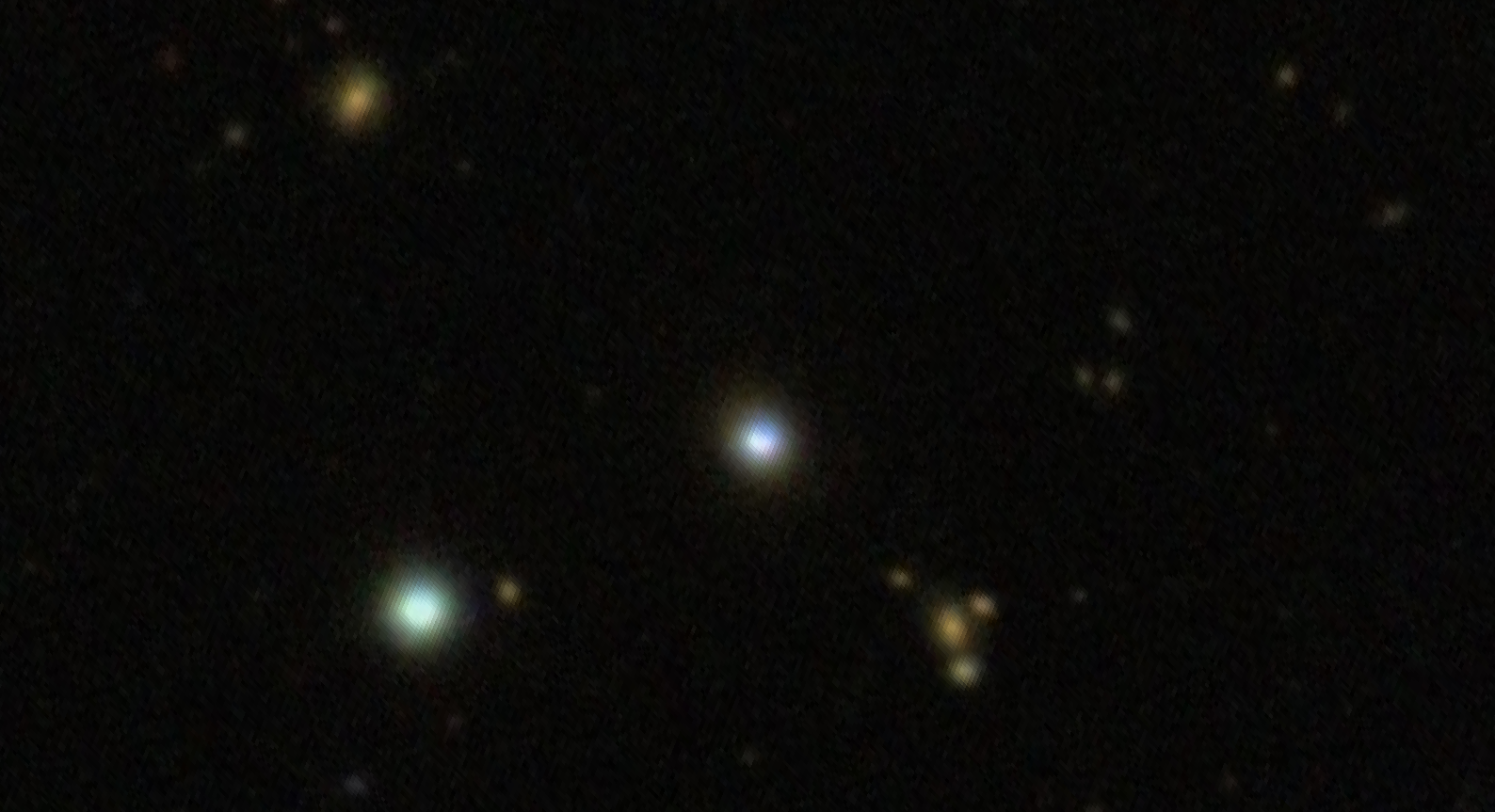
- BL Lac object 1ES 1011+496 seen by SDSS.

Observation data (J2000.0 epoch)
- Constellation: Ursa Major
- Right ascension: 10^{h} 15^{m} 04.140^{s}
- Declination: +49° 26′ 00.70″
- Redshift: 0.212000
- Heliocentric radial velocity: 63,556 km/s
- Distance: 2.727 Gly
- Apparent magnitude (V): 16.15
- Apparent magnitude (B): 16.56

Characteristics
- Type: BL LAC
- Size: 78.54 kiloparsecs (256,200 light-years) (diameter; 2MASS K-band total isophote)
- Notable features: High frequency peaked BL Lac object

Other designations
- 2MASS J10150414+49226008, RBS 0841, LEDA 2342845, NVSS J101504+492601, 7C 1011+4941, VIPS 0312, RX J1015.0+4926, 51P 104

1ES 1011+496 is a relatively distant BL Lacertae object (BL Lac) located 2.7 billion light-years away in the constellation of Ursa Major. This object has a redshift of 0.212 based on its absorption line spectrum and was first discovered as an extragalactic radio source by astronomers in March 1986.

== Description ==
1ES 1011+496 is described as a high frequency peaked BL Lac object or an HBL for short. When observed in 2007 by MAGIC Telescope, the object was found to emit very high energy gamma-rays. The findings by MAGIC, found its integrated flux was shown increasing above 200 GeV level of around 1.58 ± 0.32 × 10^{−11} photons cm^{−2} s^{−1}. The source of 1ES 1011+496 was extremely variable in X-rays with its flux estimated to be measured between 2 and 10 KeV with one small X-ray flare detected. It is also varying in optical brightness levels when detected by Tuorla Blazar Monitoring Program. In March 2023, the source was shown having a large variability upon being monitored by Neil Gehrels Swift Observatory.

A strong powerful flare was detected from 1ES 1011+496 in February 2014. Observations by MAGIC, noted the object underwent an active phrase with its flux recorded as increasing by 14 times compared to the previous flare recorded in 2007. During the observation period, the spectrum 1ES 1011+496 showed a small curvature over 1 magnitude in energy with no signs of major changes to its spectral shape. A further analysis of the object's spectral energy distribution would show the trend of the synchrotron peak shifting towards higher energies as the flux increases. This is found similar to "bluer when brighter" trend and was mainly due to particle spectrum changes.

The object displays a core-jet morphology. Prior observations made in 1986 upon its discovery, showed its morphology is compact and mainly made up of a compact radio core and some extended radio emission surrounding it in a form of a halo. A more recent observation made in 2016 based on a 15 GHz radio map, found the core is optically thick with a radio jet present. Imaging by Very Large Array, MERLIN and Very Long Baseline Array has specifically shown the jet is extending by few hundred milliarcseconds from the core in nearly same direction. When probed deeper, its angle is shown as stable and orientating at a negative degree between -100° and -80°. In addition, the jet is also found polarized with its bright features mainly appearing at different times and positions.

The host galaxy of 1ES 1011+496 is described as a relatively normal elliptical galaxy based on Hubble Space Telescope imaging and optical imaging. The magnitude of the host is estimated to be 17.30 based on observations and it has a supermassive black hole mass of 8.32 M_{☉}.
