= NeuronStudio =

NeuronStudio was a non-commercial program created at Icahn School of Medicine at Mount Sinai by the Computational Neurobiology and Imaging Center. This program performed automatic tracing and reconstruction of neuron structures from confocal image stacks. The resulting models were then exported to a file using standard formats for further processing, modeling, or for statistical analyses. NeuronStudio handled morphologic details on scales spanning local Dendritic spine geometry through complex tree topology to the gross spatial arrangement of multi-neuron networks. Its capability for automated digitization avoided the subjective errors inherent in manual tracing. The program ceased to be supported in 2012 and the project pages were eventually removed from the ISMMS Website. Its documentation and the Windows source code however are still available via the Internet Archive.

Graphical user interface (Windows version)

== Deconvolution ==
Deconvolution of imaged data is essential for an accurate 3D reconstructions. Deconvolution is an image restoration approach where 'a priori' knowledge of the optical system in the form of a point spread function (PSF) is used to obtain a better estimate of the object. A point spread function can be either calculated from the actual microscope parameters, measured with beads, or estimated and iteratively refined (Blind deconvolution). PSFs can be adjusted locally to account for variations in refractive characteristics of the tissue with depth and sample characteristics. For automated use with large, tiled tissue blocks, this is faster and more accurate than using an experimentally determined PSF.

== Skeletonization and diameter estimation ==
Quantization errors arise in standard skeletonization algorithms from the integer nature of digital images. The requirement for accurate representation of fine dendritic geometry has required the development of novel adaptations of standard skeletonization and diameter estimation algorithms to correct for these quantization errors. Iterative thinning skeletonization methods can provide a distance in voxels from each tree node to the surface of the object. This distance is the D6 metric, obtained by counting the number of voxels as they are removed in the minimal 6-connected path from the surface to the medial axis. In existing skeletonization or vectorization algorithms for dendritic morphometry, the branch cross-section at any node is approximated as circular, with the D6 metric providing the single diameter estimate. The precision of this diameter estimate is limited to the physical size of the voxels. For small structures such as thin dendrites and spines, comprising only a few voxels even at maximal imaging resolution, the error can be significant if this measure is used directly (see figure). To minimize quantization error and evaluate more precisely the geometry of the nodes, a new estimation technique exists, the Rayburst Sampling Algorithm that uses the original grayscale data rather than the segmented images for precise, continuous radius estimation, and multidirectional radius sampling to more accurately represent non-circular branch cross-sections and non-spherical spine heads.

== Rayburst algorithm ==
3D Representation of the Rayburst sampling core

The Rayburst Sampling Algorithm uses the original grayscale data rather than the segmented images for precise, continuous radius estimation, and multidirectional radius sampling to more accurately represent non-circular branch cross-sections and non-spherical spine heads. The algorithm precomputes an array of unit vectors which sample the data in multiple directions, (the Sampling Core) from which an estimate of the node's geometry is computed. Accurate representation of each direction by the sampling core requires that the N vectors should be uniformly spaced over the unit sphere. The algorithm uses a particle physics simulation in which a set N of randomly oriented unit vectors is generated, resulting in a random, nonuniform distribution of points on the sphere. Each particle then receives a repulsive force from every other particle, proportional to the inverse square of the distance between them. By iteratively displacing the particle in the direction of the resultant forces, the particles rearrange themselves. This system will tend to a stable, minimum energy configuration within approximately 40 iterations, where each particle is maximally separated from its closest neighbors. The information can be used to reconstruct 3D branches of arbitrarily irregular shapes. The diameter of an equivalent circular cross-section is computed in the plane normal to the medial axis using the Median Lower Band Diameter (MLBD). To compute the MLBD, take the set of samples and add the corresponding pairs of opposite vectors. Sort the vectors by size, define the lower band as the lower 50%, and use the distance at position N/4, representing the median of the lower band, to estimate the diameter.

== Uses of NeuronStudio ==
NeuronStudio is mainly used for quantitative morphological analysis of Dendritic spines. The biggest advantage of using NeuronStudio-based tracing of dendrites and spines is that the methods based on automatic tracing are not sensitive to the drift or movement of dendrites, because each dendrite can be separately traced in every stack. This allows to compare spines from very long recordings or more separated time points. As the NeuronStudio analysis results in accurate 3D measurements of the width of spine heads and spine length, this method is useful in detecting changes in spine morphology. Further, the use of computer-based measuring enables the analysis of hundreds of spines in a relatively short time.

== See also ==
- Confocal microscopy
- Voxel
- Point spread function
- Deconvolution
- TIFF
- Skeletonization
