= Society for Human Rights and Prisoners' Aid =

Pakistani organization

The Society for Human Rights and Prisoners' Aid (SHARP) is a Pakistani non-governmental organization (NGO) that advocates on human rights issues. The organization was founded in 1999. Headquartered in Islamabad, it also has branches in Karachi, Lahore, Peshawar, Mianwali, and Rawalpindi.
