= Four Seasons Hotel and Tower =

Four Seasons Hotel and Tower may refer to:

- Four Seasons Hotel Denver in Denver, Colorado, United States
- Four Seasons Hotel Hong Kong in Hong Kong, People's Republic of China
- Four Seasons Hotel Miami in Miami, Florida, United States
- Four Seasons Hotel Toronto in Toronto, Ontario, Canada

== See also ==
- Four Seasons Hotels and Resorts
- Four Seasons Hotel and Residences
