= Harry Blum =

Harry Blum may refer to:

- Harry Blum (politician) (1944–2000), German politician, mayor of Cologne
- Harry Blum (scientist) (1924–1987), researcher on shape analysis, topological skeletonization, biological form, and visual perception

== See also ==
- Harold Bloom (1930–2019), American literary critic
- Harold Jack Bloom (1924–1999), American television producer and screenwriter
