= Contact (mathematics) =

Two functions having equal values and derivatives at a given point

In mathematics, two functions have a contact of order k if, at a point P, they have the same value and their first k derivatives are equal. This is an equivalence relation, whose equivalence classes are generally called jets. The point of osculation is also called the double cusp. Contact is a geometric notion; it can be defined algebraically as a valuation.

One speaks also of curves and geometric objects having k-th order contact at a point: this is also called osculation (i.e. kissing), generalising the property of being tangent. (Here the derivatives are considered with respect to arc length.) An osculating curve from a given family of curves is a curve that has the highest possible order of contact with a given curve at a given point; for instance a tangent line is an osculating curve from the family of lines, and has first-order contact with the given curve; an osculating circle is an osculating curve from the family of circles, and has second-order contact (same tangent angle and curvature), etc.

== Applications ==
Contact forms are particular differential forms of degree 1 on odd-dimensional manifolds; see contact geometry. Contact transformations are related changes of coordinates, of importance in classical mechanics. See also Legendre transformation.

Contact between manifolds is often studied in singularity theory, where the type of contact are classified, these include the A series (A_{0}: crossing, A_{1}: tangent, A_{2}: osculating, ...) and the umbilic or D-series where there is a high degree of contact with the sphere.

== Contact between curves ==
Two curves in the plane intersecting at a point p are said to have:

- 0th-order contact if the curves have a simple crossing (not tangent).
- 1st-order contact if the two curves are tangent.
- 2nd-order contact if the curvatures of the curves are equal. Such curves are said to be osculating.
- 3rd-order contact if the derivatives of the curvature are equal.
- 4th-order contact if the second derivatives of the curvature are equal.

=== Contact between a curve and a circle ===
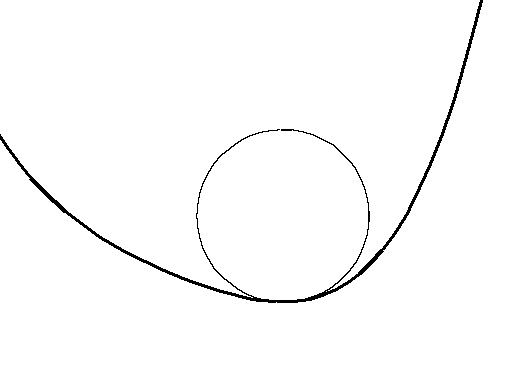
A circle with 1st-order contact (tangent)

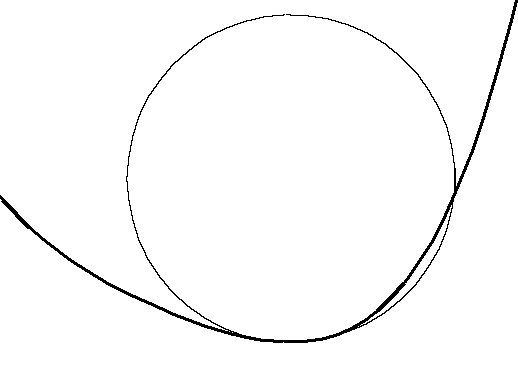
A circle with 2nd-order contact (osculating)

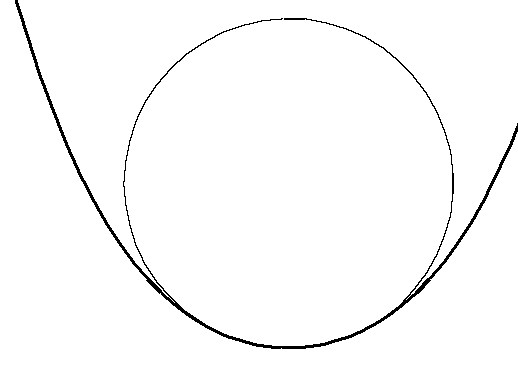
A circle with 3rd-order contact at a vertex of a curve

For each point S(t) on a smooth plane curve S, there is exactly one osculating circle, whose radius is the reciprocal of κ(t), the curvature of S at t. Where curvature is zero (at an inflection point on the curve), the osculating circle is a straight line. The locus of the centers of all the osculating circles (also called "centers of curvature") is the evolute of the curve.

If the derivative of curvature κ'(t) is zero, then the osculating circle will have 3rd-order contact and the curve is said to have a vertex. The evolute will have a cusp at the center of the circle. The sign of the second derivative of curvature determines whether the curve has a local minimum or maximum of curvature. All closed curves will have at least four vertices, two minima and two maxima (the four-vertex theorem).

In general a curve will not have 4th-order contact with any circle. However, 4th-order contact can occur generically in a 1-parameter family of curves, at a curve in the family where (as the parameter varies) two vertices (one maximum and one minimum) come together and annihilate. At such points the second derivative of curvature will be zero.

Circles which have two-point contact with two points S(t_{1}), S(t_{2}) on a curve are bi-tangent circles. The centers of all bi-tangent circles form the symmetry set. The medial axis is a subset of the symmetry set.
