= HKS =

HKS may refer to:

== Businesses and Organizations ==
- HKS (company), Japanese automotive accessory company
- HKS, Inc., American architecture and design firm
- HKSTV, a Hong Kong satellite television network
- Hibbitt, Karlsson & Sorensen, now SIMULIA, a software company
- HKS (American company), American company that makes speedloaders

== Sport ==
- Croatian Basketball Federation (Croatian: Hrvatski košarkaški savez)
- Hapoel Kfar Saba F.C., an Israeli football club
- Hong Kong Scottish, a Hong Kong rugby union club
- Hong Kong Squash, the national organization for squash in Hong Kong
- Ruch Chorzów, a Polish football club

== Transport ==
- CHC Helikopter Service, a Norwegian helicopter operator
- Hawkins Field (airport) in Jackson, Mississippi, United States
- Hoogkarspel railway station, in the Netherlands

== Other uses ==
- HKS (colour system)
- Croatian Conservative Party
- Harvard Kennedy School at Harvard University
- Heat kernel signature
- Hip-knee-shaft angle in orthopedics
- Hong Kong Sign Language
- Hezb-e Kargaran-e Socialist, the Socialist Workers' Party of Iran
