= Straight skeleton =

Method in geometry for representing a polygon by a topological skeleton

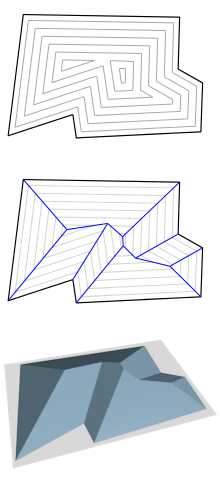
The shrinking process, the straight skeleton (blue) and the roof model.

In geometry, a straight skeleton is a method of representing a polygon by a topological skeleton. It is similar in some ways to the medial axis but differs in that the skeleton is composed of straight line segments, while the medial axis of a polygon may involve parabolic curves. However, both are homotopy-equivalent to the underlying polygon.

Straight skeletons were first defined for simple polygons by Aichholzer et al. (1995), and generalized to planar straight-line graphs (PSLG) by Aichholzer & Aurenhammer (1996). In their interpretation as projection of roof surfaces, they are already extensively discussed by G. A. Peschka (1877).

== Definition ==
The straight skeleton of a polygon is defined by a continuous shrinking process in which the edges of the polygon are moved inwards parallel to themselves at a constant speed. As the edges move in this way, the vertices where pairs of edges meet also move, at speeds that depend on the angle of the vertex. If one of these moving vertices collides with a nonadjacent edge, the polygon is split in two by the collision, and the process continues in each part. The straight skeleton is the set of curves traced out by the moving vertices in this process. In the illustration the top figure shows the shrinking process and the middle figure depicts the straight skeleton in blue.

== Algorithms ==
The straight skeleton may be computed by simulating the shrinking process by which it is defined; a number of variant algorithms for computing it have been proposed, differing in the assumptions they make on the input and in the data structures they use for detecting combinatorial changes in the input polygon as it shrinks.

The following algorithms consider an input that forms a polygon, a polygon with holes, or a PSLG. For a polygonal input we denote the number of vertices by n and the number of reflex (concave, i.e., angle greater than π) vertices by r. If the input is a PSLG then we consider the initial wavefront structure, which forms a set of polygons, and again denote by n the number of vertices and by r the number of reflex vertices w.r.t. the propagation direction. Most of the algorithms listed here are designed and analyzed in the real RAM model of computation.

- Aichholzer et al. showed how to compute straight skeletons of PSLGs in time O(n^{3} log n), or more precisely time O((n^{2}+f) log n), where n is the number of vertices of the input polygon and f is the number of flip events during the construction. The best known bound for f is O(n^{3}).
- An algorithm with a worst case running time in O(nr log n), or simply O(n^{2} log n), is given by Huber and Held (2010, 2011), who argue that their approach is likely to run in near-linear time for many inputs.
- Petr Felkel and Štěpán Obdržálek designed an algorithm for simple polygons that is said to have an efficiency of O(nr + n log r). However, it has been shown that their algorithm is incorrect.
- By using data structures for the bichromatic closest pair problem, Eppstein and Erickson showed how to construct straight skeleton problems using a linear number of closest pair data structure updates. A closest pair data structure based on quadtrees provides an O(nr + n log n) time algorithm, or a significantly more complicated data structure leads to the better asymptotic time bound O(n^{1 + ε} + n^{8/11 + ε}r^{9/11 + ε}), or more simply O(n^{17/11 + ε}), where ε is any constant greater than zero. This remains the best worst-case time bound known for straight skeleton construction with unrestricted inputs, but is complicated and has not been implemented.
- For simple polygons in general position, the problem of straight skeleton construction is easier. Cheng, Mencel, and Vigneron showed how to compute the straight skeleton of simple polygons in time O(n log n log r + r^{4/3 + ε}). In the worst case, r may be on the order of n, in which case this time bound may be simplified to O(n^{4/3+ε}). If the vertices of the input polygon have O(log n)-bit rational coordinates, their algorithm can be improved to run in O(n log n) time, even if the input polygon is not in general position.
- A monotone polygon with respect to a line L is a polygon with the property that every line orthogonal to L intersects the polygon in a single interval. When the input is a monotone polygon, its straight skeleton can be constructed in time O(n log^{2} n).

== Applications ==
Each point within the input polygon can be lifted into three-dimensional space by using the time at which the shrinking process reaches that point as the z-coordinate of the point. The resulting three-dimensional surface has constant height on the edges of the polygon, and rises at constant slope from them except for the points of the straight skeleton itself, where surface patches at different angles meet. In this way, the straight skeleton can be used as the set of ridge lines of a building roof, based on walls in the form of the initial polygon. The bottom figure in the illustration depicts a surface formed from the straight skeleton in this way.

Demaine, Demaine and Lubiw used the straight skeleton as part of a technique for folding a sheet of paper so that a given polygon can be cut from it with a single straight cut (the fold-and-cut theorem), and related origami design problems.

Barequet et al. use straight skeletons in an algorithm for finding a three-dimensional surface that interpolates between two given polygonal chains.

Tănase and Veltkamp propose to decompose concave polygons into unions of convex regions using straight skeletons, as a preprocessing step for shape matching in image processing.

Bagheri and Razzazi use straight skeletons to guide vertex placement in a graph drawing algorithm in which the graph drawing is constrained to lie inside a polygonal boundary.

The straight skeleton can also be used to construct an offset curve of a polygon, with mitered corners, analogously to the construction of an offset curve with rounded corners formed from the medial axis. Tomoeda and Sugihara apply this idea in the design of signage, visible from wide angles, with an illusory appearance of depth. Similarly, Asente and Carr use straight skeletons to design color gradients that match letter outlines or other shapes.

As with other types of skeleton such as the medial axis, the straight skeleton can be used to collapse a two-dimensional area to a simplified one-dimensional representation of the area. For instance, Haunert and Sester describe an application of this type for straight skeletons in geographic information systems, in finding the centerlines of roads.

In finite element method (FEM) mesh generation, the straight skeleton and layer-based contraction concepts have been used to decompose complex geometric domains for hydrodynamic and shallow-water modeling. By analyzing the wavefront propagation layers, algorithms can automatically transform unstructured triangular meshes into aligned quadrilateral and mixed-element grids while conforming to an underlying geometric size function.

Every tree with no degree-two vertices can be realized as the straight skeleton of a convex polygon. The convex hull of the roof shape corresponding to this straight skeleton forms a Steinitz realization of the Halin graph formed from the tree by connecting its leaves in a cycle.

== Higher dimensions ==
Barequet et al. defined a version of straight skeletons for three-dimensional polyhedra, described algorithms for computing it, and analyzed its complexity on several different types of polyhedron.

Huber et al. investigated metric spaces under which the corresponding Voronoi diagrams and straight skeletons coincide. For two dimensions, the characterization of such metric spaces is complete. For higher dimensions, this method can be interpreted as a generalization of straight skeletons of certain input shapes to arbitrary dimensions by means of Voronoi diagrams.
