= Four Seasons Hotel Denver =

Mixed-use skyscraper in Denver

Coordinates: 39°44′47″N 104°59′53″W

Four Seasons Hotel and Private Residences Denver
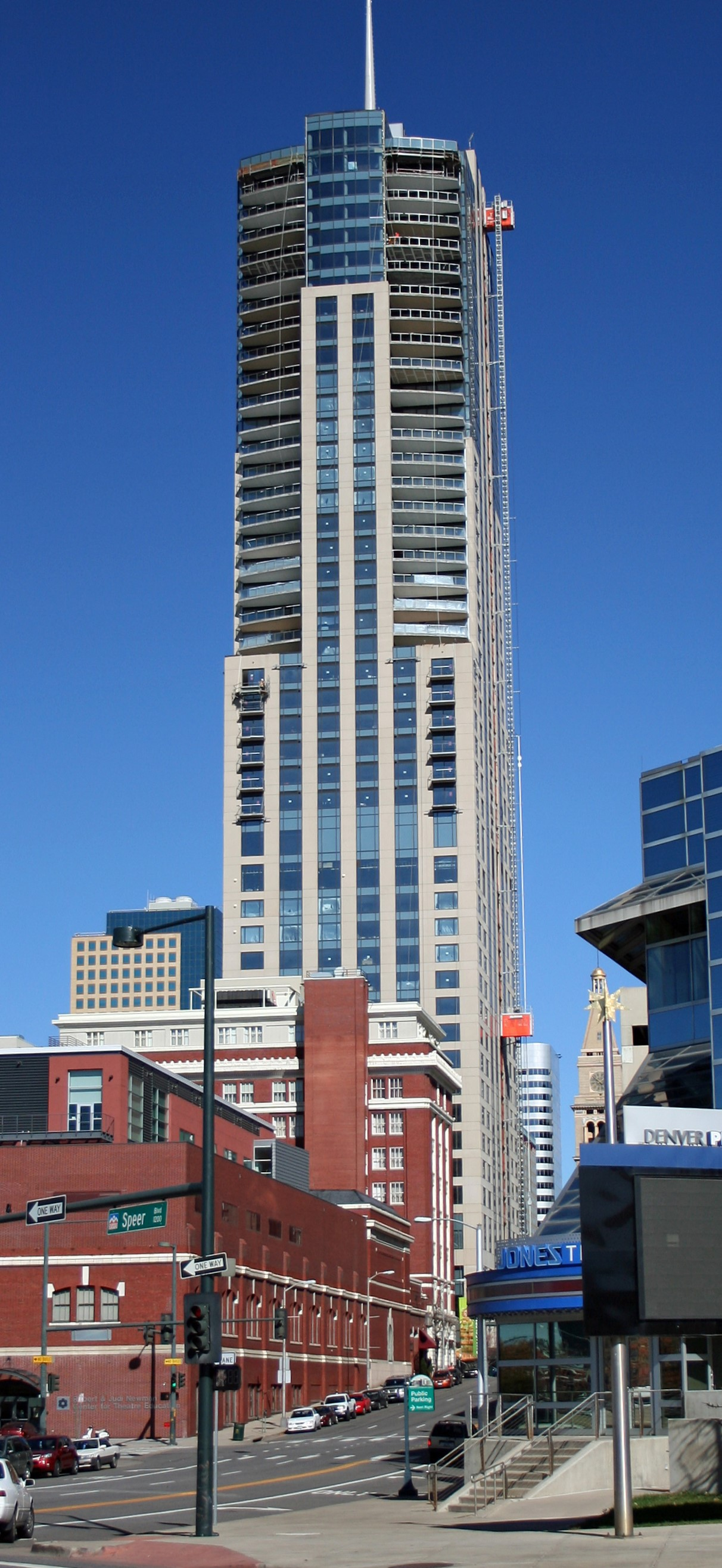
- Nearing completion in late 2009
- Interactive map of the Four Seasons Hotel and Private Residences Denver area

General information
- Status: Completed
- Type: Mixed Use
- Location: 14th & Arapahoe/15th & Lawrence, Denver, Colorado
- Completed: October 19, 2010

Height
- Antenna spire: 641 ft (195 m)
- Roof: 565 ft (172 m)

Technical details
- Floor count: 45
- Floor area: 766,487 sq ft (71,209 m^{2})

Design and construction
- Architecture firm: HKS, CLB Architects
- Structural engineer: Brockette/Davis/Drake, Inc.
- Main contractor: Swinerton

Other information
- Number of rooms: 239 (including 21 suites)

Website
- www.fourseasons.com/denver/

Four Seasons Hotel and Private Residences Denver is a 565 feet (172 m) tall skyscraper in Denver, Colorado, United States. This makes it the 4th tallest building in Denver. It was completed in 2010 and has 45 stories and 766,487 sq ft (71,209 m^{2}) of usable floor space. It is estimated to cost $350 million, or $456.63 per sq. ft., which would make it the most expensive privately owned building ever constructed in Denver. It is a mixed-use building, containing a pool, fitness center and amenities.

The lower 24 floors contain the Four Seasons Hotel, while the upper 21 floors contain residential suites. The hotel operates 239 guest rooms and suites. As of 2010, it was the tallest mixed-use tower in Denver.

== See also ==
- List of tallest buildings in Denver
