= Kalri (Bhimber District) =

Kalri is a village in District Bhimber, of Azad Kashmir. It is located equidistant between Bhimber and Mirpur – approximately 25 km on either side. At an altitude of 357 meters above sea level, it is situated at a latitude of 33.06 (33° 3' 30 N) and a longitude of 73.9 (73° 53' 50 E).

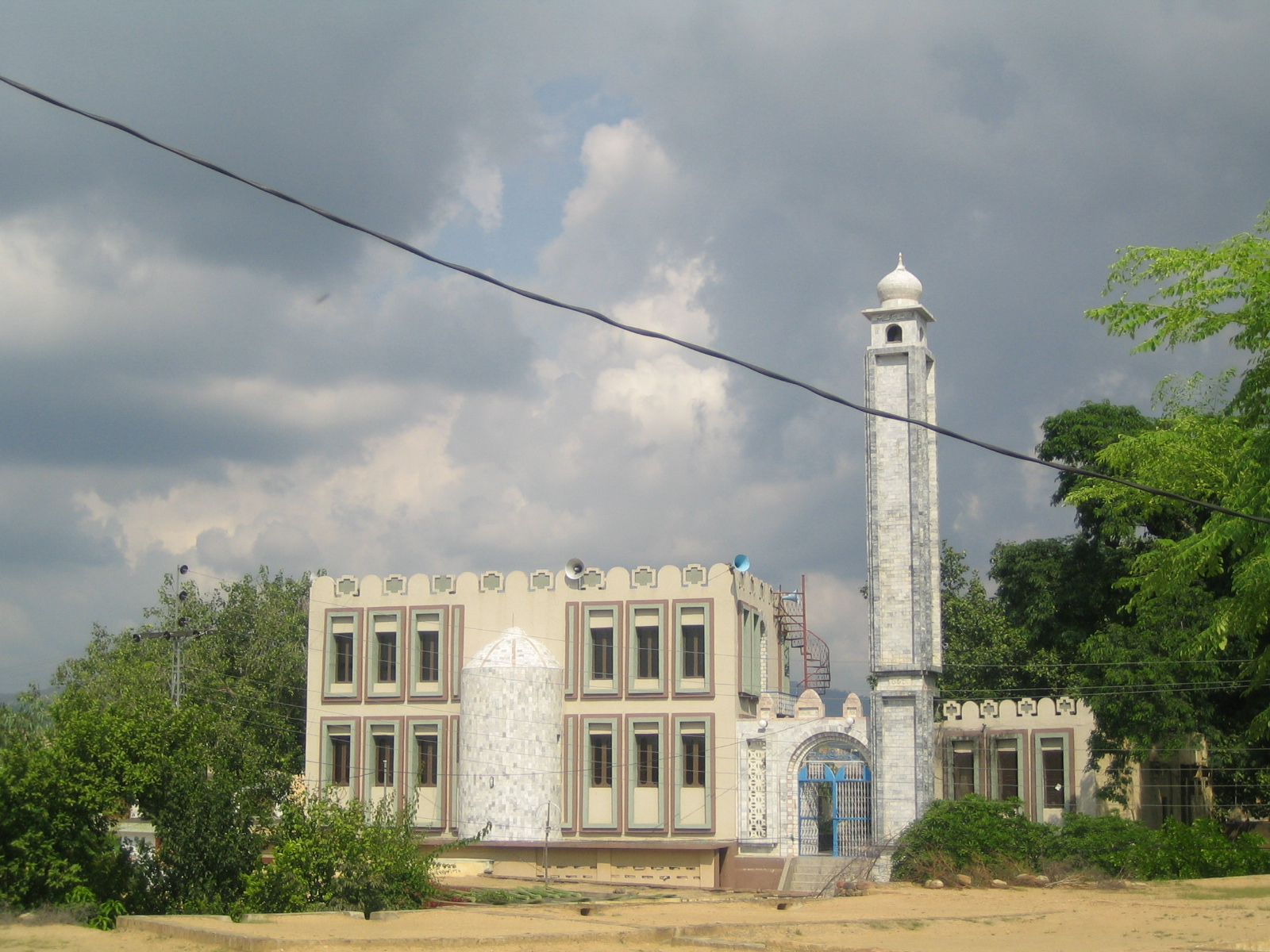
Jamia Masjid Kalri.

== Demographics ==
The village is inhabited predominantly by CHIB Rajputs. Other castes living within the jurisdiction of Union Council Kalri include Syed, Arain, Kashmiri, Sheikh, Malik, Mughal, etc. Until the late 1970s, the main profession of the people of the town involved working in Army. Since then, the trend has shifted and increasing numbers have emigrated, particularly to the United Kingdom.

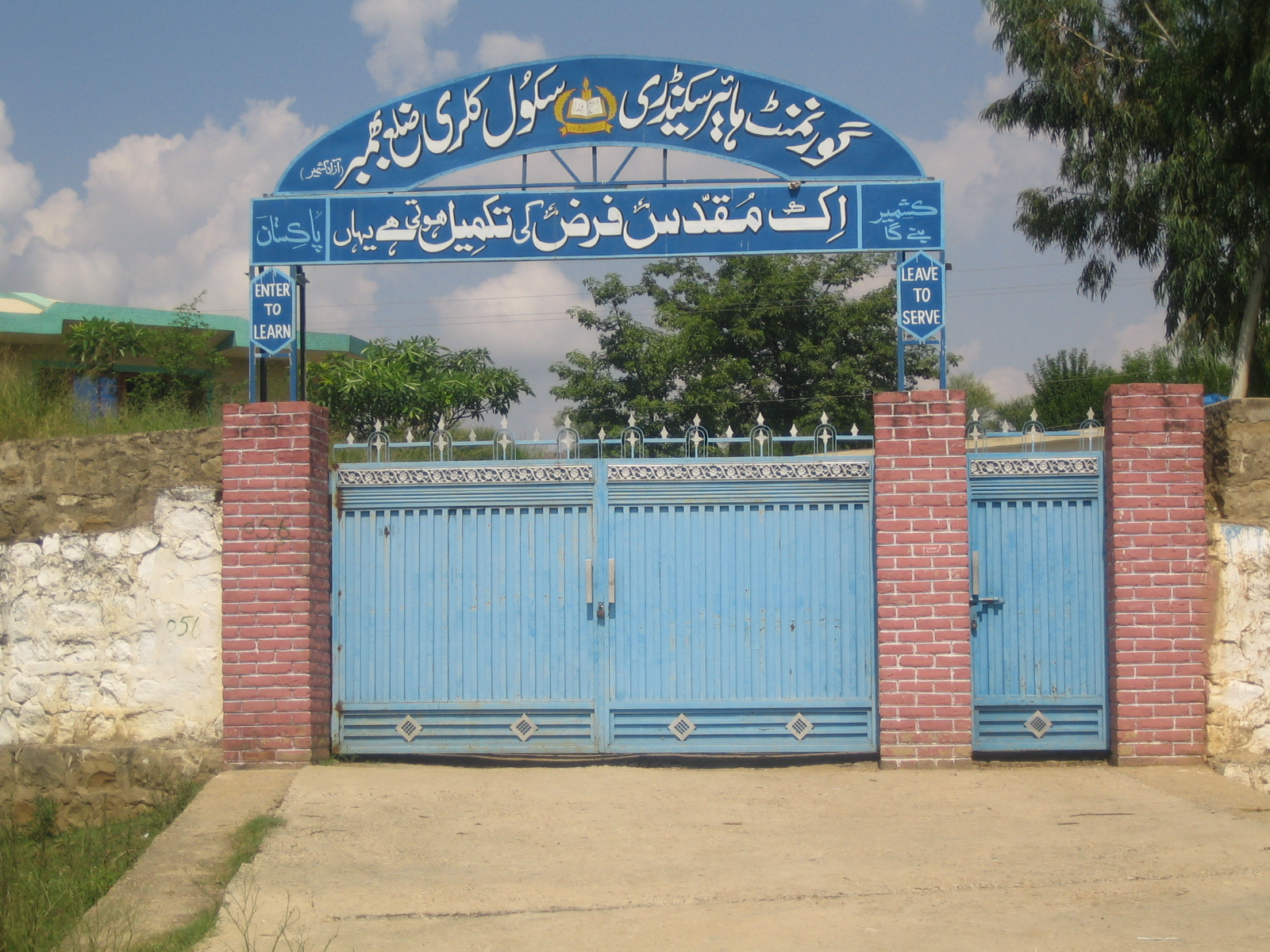
Higher Secondary School For Boys Kalri.

== Institutions and amenities ==
The village is served by Government Higher Secondary School for Boys and Government High School for Girls, Post Office, United Bank Limited, telephone facility and a Basic Health Unit and Jamia Mosque.

The Khidmat-e-Insaniyat Foundation Kalri (KIFK) has been set up to promote the cause of helping the helpless families in different facets of life, but with primary focus on education of their children.

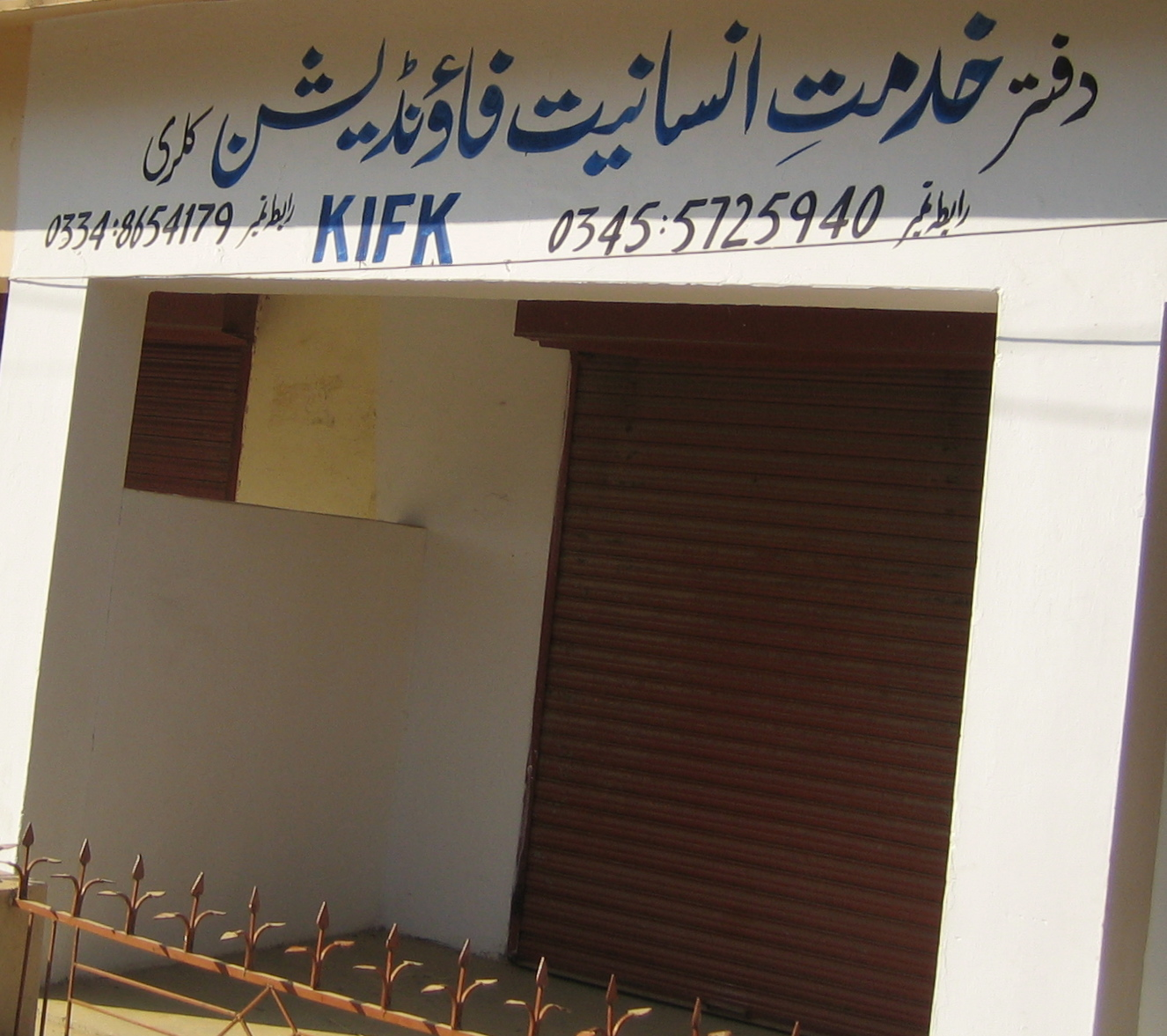
Khidmat-e-Insaniyat Foundation Kalri.

=== Army Public School (APS) ===
Considering the long-standing desire of the people of the area for better education of their children, particularly those retired and serving Army soldiers, Pakistan Army eventually approved establishment of an APS at Kalri, a central place with all weather accessibility to vast majority of people in the area. Its first academic session commenced in May 2014 from Play-Group to Fifth class. In view of overwhelming response of the locals, foundation stone for purpose-built School Campus was laid down in January 2015 being financed through various sources including donation of land/ funds by the locals. This is likely to serve as mile-stone for upcoming generation of the area.

== Niabat (Sub Tehsil) ==
Considering the difficulties of the people from far flung areas who had to often travel for even minor land and revenue related issues to Tehsil Headquarters, Azad Kashmir Government has established "Niabat" at Kalri with the concept to provide basic services to the people at their door-step.

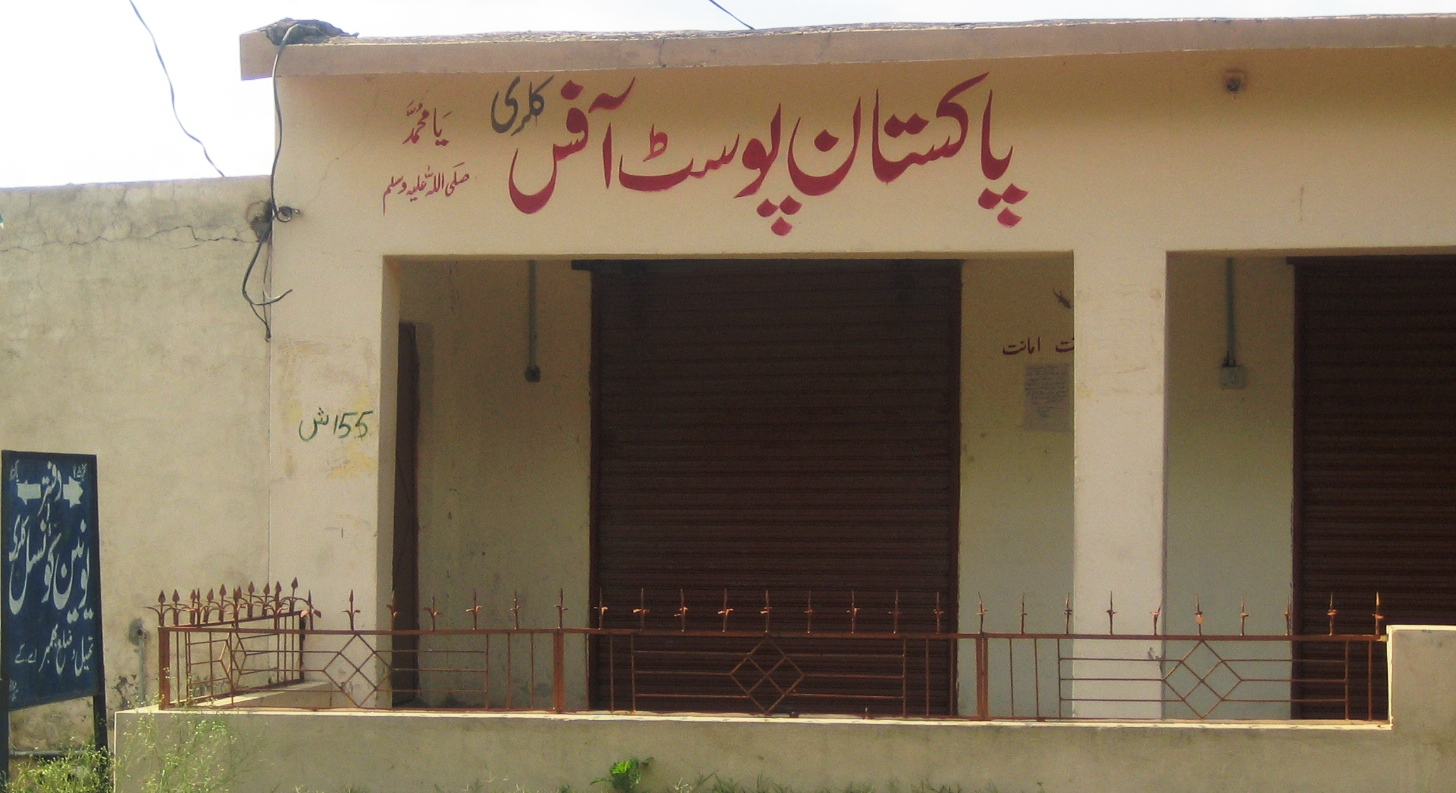
Post Office Kalri.

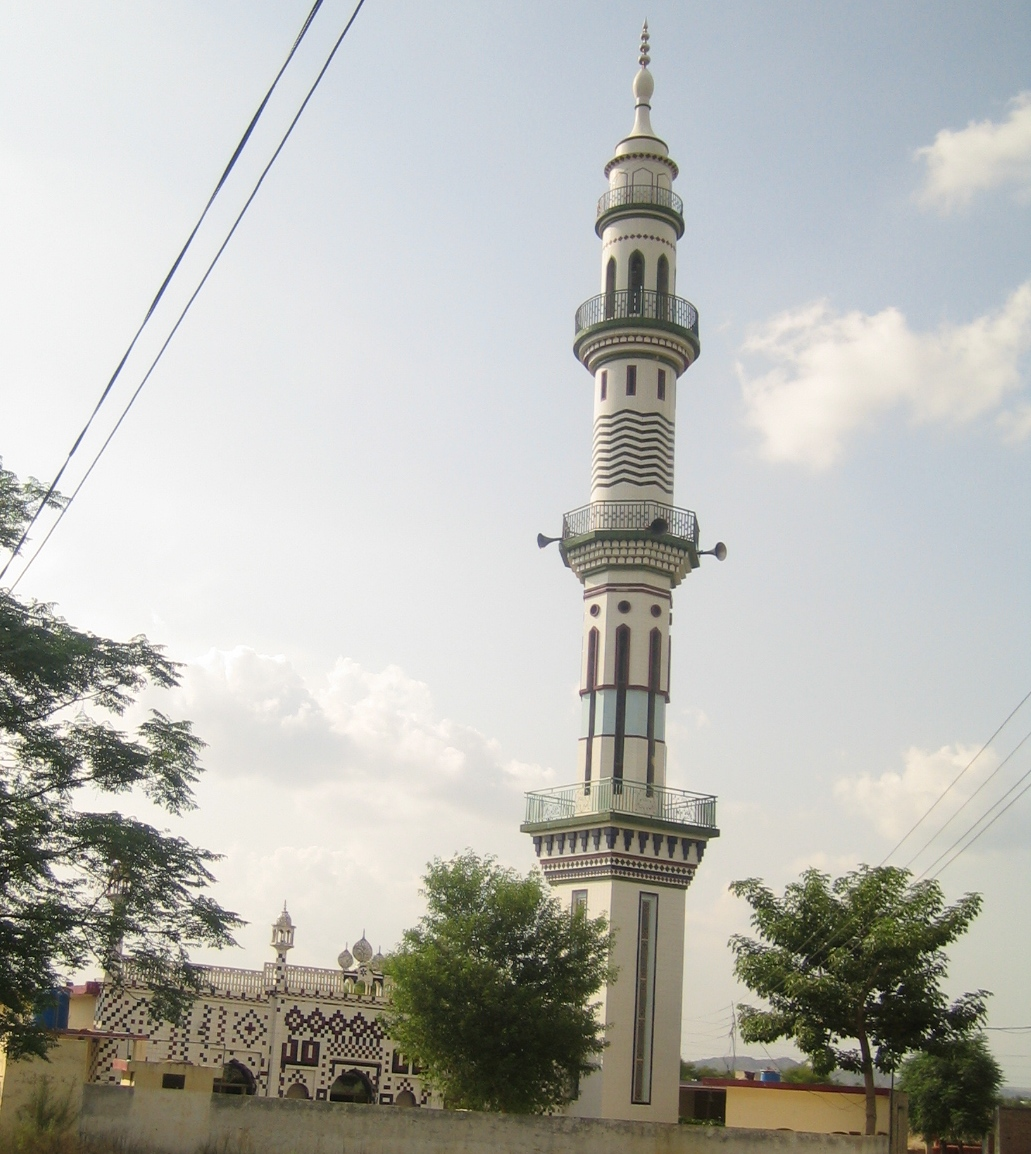
Kamagri Mosque, Kalri More.

== Notable people ==
- Major Raja Muhammad Afzal Khan

== Nearby towns ==
Kalri is a large union council comprising a number of villages and localities with a population of over 20,000, including:

- Kalri More (1.4 km)
- Kamagri (1.5 km)
- Hillan (1.8 km)
- Ghaseet Phalli (1.2 km to the north west)
- Malikabad (2.4 km)
- Chah Mochian (3.5 km)
- Gawwa/ Pir Gujja (1.4 km to the north west)
- Gura Nakka (2.4 km)
- Khaddora
- Mera Pothi (2.8 km to the east)
- Pehl (3.9 km to the east)
- Jabbi (5 km)
- Ibrahimabad (4.5 km)

Also a close village next to Kalri is Panjeri and these two villages have very close links.
