= Namal University =

Private university in Pakistan

- Type: Not-For-Profit
- Established: 2008
- Affiliations: Higher Education Commission (Pakistan), Pakistan Engineering Council
- Chairman: Walid Iqbal
- Faculty: 58
- Undergraduates: 500
- Location: Rikhi, Mianwali District, Punjab, Pakistan
- Campus: Suburban
Colours
- Nickname: Namal
- Website: namal.edu.pk

Namal University is a private university in Mianwali District, Punjab, Pakistan. It is located on 30 km, Talagang Mianwali Road near Namal Lake and Namal Dam.

== History ==
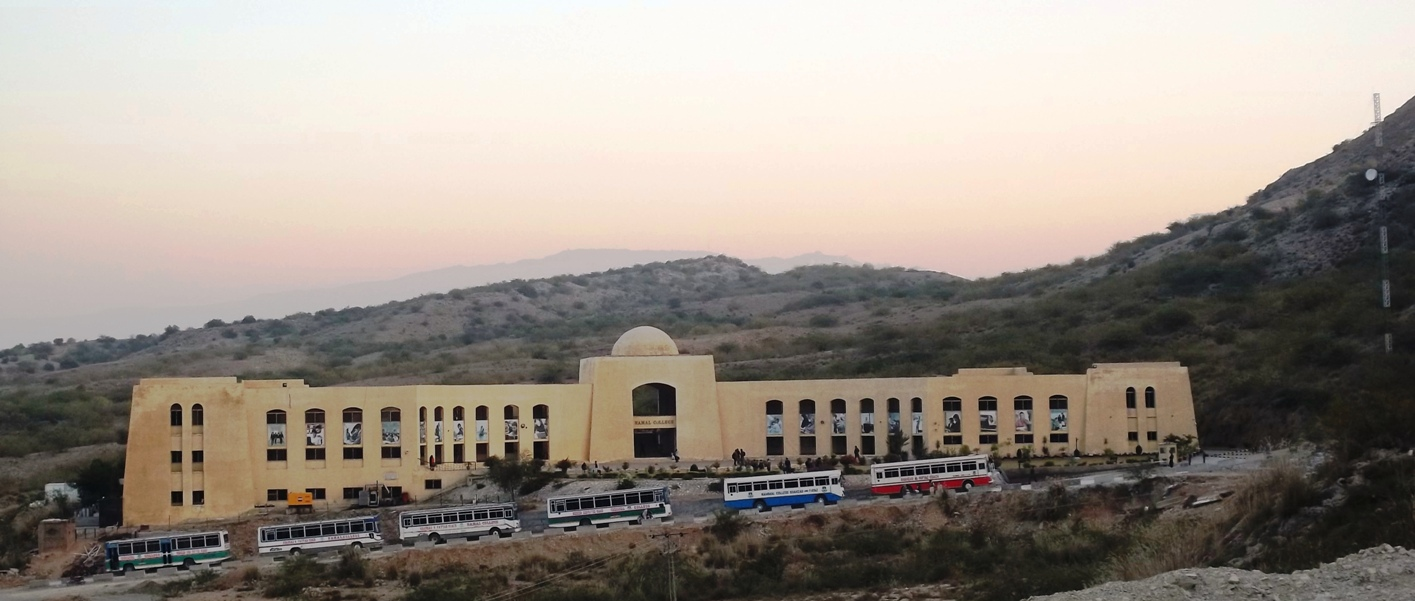
Namal University Admin Block

In 2002, Imran Khan began developing the concept of establishing a college adjacent to Namal Lake in the Mianwali District after observing high unemployment rates among the youth, many of whom were unskilled. After being appointed Chancellor of the University of Bradford in 2005, Imran Khan initiated efforts to establish a connection between his proposed Namal College and the university. In December 2005, an agreement was reached to grant Namal College associate status at the University of Bradford. The construction of the college began in 2006 and it was inaugurated as Namal College in 2008 by Imran Khan. The college was then affiliated with the University of Bradford and later it established the Imran Khan Foundation to fund scholarships for more than 90 percent of students who would study at the college coming from humble backgrounds. The 40 kanal of land area for the college was provided by the Government of Punjab, Pakistan.

In 2007, Imran Khan invited ten students from Bradford to spend a week studying at Namal College in Pakistan. The program aimed to educate participants about the economic, cultural, and social challenges facing Pakistan and to observe the effects of globalization on developing countries. The initiative was organized by the Yorkshire regional team of the Young Enterprise organization and supported by Bradford Kickstart of the Bradford Council.

In 2009, Namal College enrolled its inaugural class of 68 students in programs including computer science, software engineering, and network administration.

In 2019, Namal College became a degree awarding institute (DAI) and was renamed as Namal Institute.

In 2021, Namal Institute was elevated to university status and became Namal University.

== Administration ==
Namal University is governed by a Board of Governors. Walid Iqbal serves as Chairman of the Board of Governors, while M. Najam ul Islam serves as Rector.

== Centre for AI and BigData ==
The Centre for AI and Big Data (CAID) is a research centre that pushes the boundaries of artificial intelligence and big data innovation. The mission is to drive cutting-edge research, provide creative solutions, and promote expert talent in these transformative technologies. CAID aims to drive economic growth, improve lives, and shape the future of AI and big data.

The CAID operates and provides support and facilities in two areas: High-Performance Computing (HPC) and Secure Digital System Design.

The CAID HPC facility houses one of the fastest supercomputing facilities in Pakistan, Pakistan Supercomputing Centre, providing support and services in the areas of AI, Big Data, Modeling, and Simulation.

The Secure Digital System Design facility provides end-to-end digital system design, including hardware-software co-design, open-hardware architectures, and open-source software stacks.

== See also ==
List of universities in Pakistan

- List of universities in Islamabad
- List of universities in Punjab, Pakistan
- List of universities in Sindh
- List of universities in Khyber Pakhtunkhwa
- List of universities in Balochistan
- List of universities in Azad Kashmir
- List of universities in Gilgit-Baltistan
