= Harry Blum (scientist) =

American researcher

Harry Blum (January 30, 1924 – April 19, 1987) was a researcher at the National Institutes of Health, known for his work in 1967 introducing the medial axis and grassfire transform of a shape, and more generally for his work on shape analysis, topological skeletonization, biological form, and visual perception.

== Life ==
Blum was originally from New York City, where he was born on January 30, 1924. During World War II, he worked for the Navy in the New York Naval Shipyard. After the war, he became an engineer for the New York City Subway before going to Cornell University, where he graduated in 1950.

From 1950 to 1958 he worked for the United States Air Force at the Rome Air Development Center, also earning a master's degree in electrical engineering at Syracuse University in 1958. From 1958 to 1960 he worked for NATO at the SHAPE Technical Centre in the Netherlands, and from 1960 to 1967 he worked for the Air Force Cambridge Research Laboratories, where he began his work on biological and visual shape description. He joined the National Institutes of Health, in the Lab of Statistical and Mathematical Methodology of the Division of Computer Research, in 1967, and retired in 1982.

He died on April 19, 1987.

== Selected publications ==
A.	Blum, Harry (1967), "A transformation for extracting new descriptors of shape", in Wathen-Dunn, Weiant (ed.), Models for the Perception of Speech and Visual Form, Cambridge, Massachusetts: MIT Press, pp. 362–380

B.	Blum, Harry (February 1973), "Biological shape and visual science (part I)", Journal of Theoretical Biology, 38 (2): 205–287, Bibcode:1973JThBi..38..205B, doi:10.1016/0022-5193(73)90175-6, PMID 4689997

C.	Blum, Harry; Nagel, Roger N. (January 1978), "Shape description using weighted symmetric axis features", Pattern Recognition, 10 (3): 167–180, Bibcode:1978PatRe..10..167B, doi:10.1016/0031-3203(78)90025-0
