= Thamewali =

Thamewali تھمےوالی
- Town and union council
- Thamewali
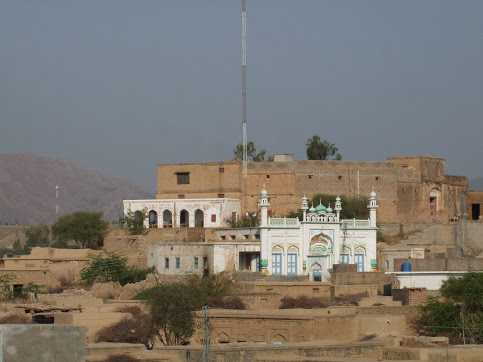
- Interactive map of Thamewali
- Coordinates: 32°47′06″N 71°46′49″E
- Country: Pakistan
- Region: Punjab
- District: Mianwali District
- Elevation: 448 m (1,470 ft)
- Time zone: UTC+5 (PST)
- Postal code: 42200

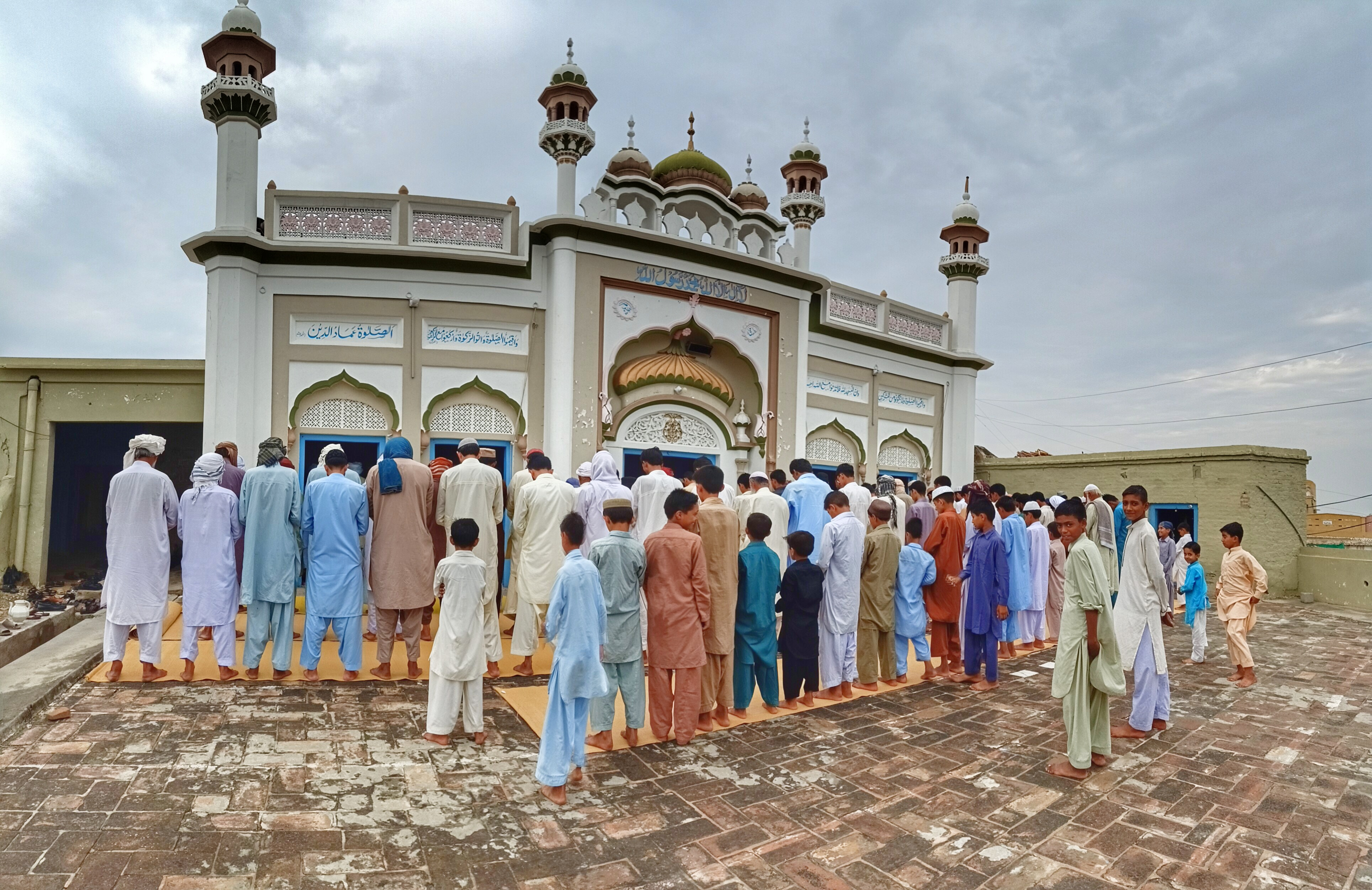
People praying in Thamewali, 2019.

Thamewali is a town and union council of Mianwali District in the Punjab province of Pakistan. It is part of Mianwali Tehsil and is at 32°47'6N 71°46'49E and has an altitude of 448 m (1,470 ft).

== History ==
After the partition of India and Pakistan in 1947 Hindus left the area. In 2009 the Pakistani army began occupying the area to for nuclear weapon storage.

== Geography ==
Thamewali has salt range mountains on the west side of the village. There is a fort on top of the mountain

== See also ==
- Kalri (Mianwali District)
