= Kalri, Chiniot =

Village in Punjab, Pakistan

Kalri (formerly Kul Kalri) is a village located 56 km from Jhang, on the western bank of the Chenab River in Chiniot district, of Punjab, Pakistan.

Population:

Kalri is a large village in terms of population, inhabited by many landowner communities (Zameendar Biradris) including :

Sangra,Kuraira,Kullah,Malera,Harya(Kullah,Malera,Harya and kuraira is also sub clans of Chadhar tribe) Bhatti,Mangan,Bhutta, ,Sayyed,Matela,Sahmal,Chadhar and among others

Sub-localities inside kalri ( formerly kul kalri):

"The area of Kul Kalri encompasses smaller hamlets, including Ahmad Wala,Maru bhattia,Thatha Harya,PipalBhutta, and Thatha Kuraira."

Highlighted locations of Kalri:

In the overall locations of Kalri places like Kalri Adda, Kalri Chowk (also known by locals as Kuraira Chowk), and Kalri Bridge are included.

== Government ==
Government High School Kalri is a well known school in Kalri with EMIS code 33430030. There are many private schools here as well.

== Staff ==
- Muhammad Akhtar SST(IT)
- Hakim Khan SST(Late)
- Rustam Ali PST
- Nasir Ahmad PST
- Irshad Ahmad PST
- Ghulam Murtaza
