= Kalri Jagir =

- village
- Location in Haryana, India Kalri Jagir (India)
- Coordinates: 29°57′15″N 77°8′54″E
- Country: India
- State: Haryana
- District: Karnal
- Elevation: 241 m (791 ft)

Languages
  - Official: Hindi
- Time zone: UTC+5:30 (IST)
- PIN: 132054
- Telephone code: 91-184
- ISO 3166 code: IN-HR
- Vehicle registration: HR - 75
- Website: haryana.gov.in

Kalri Jagir is a village in the district Karnal, Haryana (India). It is on the bank of Amalgamation canal and is not very far from the River Yamuna. Yamuna flows about 4 km from here.

== Overview ==
The village falls under Indri Tehsil of Karnal district, and is around 35 km from the district headquarters. Kurukshetra lies on the north-west and Yamunanagar on northern side of this village. The Grand Trunk Road, (Old National Highway No. 1 / now National Highway No. 44) is about 30 km from here.

All the traditional festivals of India are celebrated in the village. Diwali, Bhai-dooj, Holi, Teez, Shivaratri, Navaratre, Raksha Bandhan, Dussehra, Lohri are some of them.

As per the census conducted by government of India in 2011 the population of the village is 2310, and as per Census 1991 the population was 1843. The villagers say that the history of this village goes back to the pre-independence days of India. They say that the village was a Jagir during British and Mughal era, from this denomination the village draws its name Kalri 'Jagir'.

The village has a special place in district Karnal and Haryana State at large. The agricultural land under the control of village panchayat is among the largest in the district Karnal. This fact is also reminiscent of the developmental works undertaken in the village.

The infrastructure development is fairly good compared with other surrounding villages. The outer village area is marked by a boundary in the form of a concrete road locally called 'Firni'. There is a main street in the village that passes by rightly from the center of the village. This village has played a far front role in the Swach Bharat campaign of Government of India, It is very clean and has good sanitation system across its area limits. The village streets are made of concrete and are cemented. The streets are well illuminated with more than 100 solar lamps. There are two water pumping centers in the village for public distribution of clean and potable water.

The primary occupation of the villagers is agriculture, though nowadays some of them are also exploring avenues in vocational sectors. Not many of them have entered the entrepreneurship or even in the small scale industry segment. Farmers are progressive in their approach, though they are not the first to adopt the newer techniques of farming but show interested in these.

Wheat, rice and sugarcane are the major crops sown by the farmers. However nowadays other cash crops and vegetables are also grown by them in a relatively limited area. The introduction of vegetables in farming sector especially tomatoes has ushered prosperity of the villagers. At present farmers are doing their best to adopt progressive technologies of farming such as submersible boring, grounded pipe irrigation, soil structure analysis and arrangement of generator for dealing with scarcity of electricity.

There is a government senior secondary school in the village apart from three other public schools. This school is a center of learning for the children of Kalri Jagir and several adjacent villages. The children from nearby villages come here to learn and study. This school has imparted education to thousands of students and is serving the humanity. There are three other schools operating in the private sector and they are also doing a good job.

Taking care of physical and mental growth of younger generation the village panchayat with the help of government has constructed a sports complex cum stadium, 'Rajiv Gandhi Khel Parisar'. This sports complex will be of the block level. The village panchayat has also constructed a primary Community Health Care Center with the help of government. Now villagers get basic health facilities at their door step. A marriage cum other ceremonies hall (Banquet Hall) has also been constructed by the village panchayat. So the ceremonial functions in the village can be held with decency and grace.

There are several chaupals in the village. These are located in the localities of different communities. Villagers, generally elders sit there and spend their leisure time while playing cards, gossiping or discussing matters of importance to the village.

There is a government Pashudhan centre (veterinary centre) in the village. The veterinary doctor assures that all the pet animals be disease free and healthy. People consult the doctor for their cattle. Two anganwaries run by the government take care of the proper growth of the toddlers in the village. These provide pre-nursery training as well as nutritious food to the children.

The Village panchayat with the help of State Government has constructed a 'Vridha Ashram' i.e. a place for Elderly. It can be used for various social purposes by the villagers. Usually Elders sit here and add a bit of quality in their pass time.

There are few very famous small market areas in the village. After their daily chores people go there in the evening to sit and gossip as well as drink juice and enjoy a samosa or bread pakora or Jalebi. Other than this there is also one very old place called "Adda", and that has a 4-5 shops. Villagers are used to enjoy pakora from these shops from very long time. Many government employees with major roaming schedule and those people who do majorly hawking jobs spend their resting time here while enjoying tea and playing the cards.

== People and economy ==
The villagers are fairly well as for as the economy of district Karnal is concerned. Most of them are neither very rich nor very poor. Despite this fact there are many households which fall under the Below Poverty Line demarcated by Government of India. The need is to improve the livelihood sources of the villagers. New and diversified ways of earning a fairly good livelihood should be devised by the government. The government should come forward to help the people improve their earnings and quality of life. The village needs infrastructural development and agriculture improvement. This can be done through positive intervention in the areas of training and exploring diversified sectors of employment.

== Census ==
Village : KALRI JAGIR
District	KARNAL
Tehsil	Indri
Block	Indri
Panchayat	Kalri Jagir
Thana	Indri
Assembly Const.	Indri
Post Office	Kalri Jagir
HADBAST	5
Population (2011 Census)
Total no. of Houses	431
Total Population	2310
Child (0–6)	240
SC Population	398
Literacy
Total Literacy Rate	76.96%
Literacy Male	82.09%
Literacy Female	70.81%
Main Workers
Total Worker	849
Main Worker	799
Marginal Worker	50
As per census 2011.
Population (1991 Census)
Households	265
Total Population	1843
SC Population	225
Literacy
Total Literate	898
Literate Male	577
Literate Female	321
Main Workers
Main Worker (Male)	510
Main Worker (Female)	41
As per census 1991.
