= Kalri (Mianwali District) =

Village in Mianwali District, Punjab, Pakistan

Kalri is a village in Mianwali District, Punjab, Pakistan near Namal Lake in the Awankari region in the foothills of the Salt Range.

Population of village Kalri (Mianwali District) as per 2017 Pakistani census is11,433 with 2064 households.

== See also ==
- Namal Valley
