= Heat kernel =

Fundamental solution to the heat equation, given boundary values

In the mathematical study of heat conduction and diffusion, a heat kernel is the fundamental solution to the heat equation on a specified domain with appropriate boundary conditions. It is also one of the main tools in the study of the spectrum of the Laplace operator, and is thus of some auxiliary importance throughout mathematical physics. The heat kernel represents the evolution of temperature in a region whose boundary is held fixed at a particular temperature (typically zero), such that an initial unit of heat energy is placed at a point at time t = 0.

== Definition ==
Fundamental solution of the one-dimensional heat equation. Red: time course of $\Phi(x,t)$. Blue: time courses of $\Phi(x_0,t)$ for two selected points. Interactive version.

The most well-known heat kernel is the heat kernel of d-dimensional Euclidean space R^{d}, which has the form of a time-varying Gaussian function,
$$K(t,x,y) = \frac{1}{\left(4\pi t\right)^{d/2}} \exp\left(-\frac{\left\|x - y\right\|^2}{4t}\right),$$
which is defined for all $x,y\in\mathbb{R}^d$ and $t > 0$. This solves the heat equation
$$\left\{
\begin{aligned}
& \frac{\partial K}{\partial t}(t,x,y) = \Delta_x K(t,x,y)\\
& \lim_{t \to 0} K(t,x,y) = \delta(x-y) = \delta_x(y)
\end{aligned}
\right.$$
for the unknown function K. Here δ is a Dirac delta distribution, and the limit is taken in the sense of distributions, that is, for every function ϕ in the space C^{∞}_{c}(R^{d}) of smooth functions with compact support, we have
$$\lim_{t \to 0}\int_{\mathbb{R}^d} K(t,x,y)\phi(y)\,dy = \phi(x).$$

On a more general domain Ω in R^{d}, such an explicit formula is not generally possible. The next simplest cases of a disc or square involve, respectively, Bessel functions and Jacobi theta functions. Nevertheless, the heat kernel still exists and is smooth for t > 0 on arbitrary domains and indeed on any Riemannian manifold with boundary, provided the boundary is sufficiently regular. More precisely, in these more general domains, the heat kernel is the solution of the initial boundary value problem
$$\begin{cases}
\frac{\partial K}{\partial t}(t,x,y) = \Delta_x K(t,x,y) & \text{for all } t>0 \text{ and } x,y\in\Omega \\[6pt]
\lim_{t \to 0} K(t,x,y) = \delta_x(y) & \text{for all } x,y\in\Omega\\[6pt]
K(t,x,y) = 0 & x\in\partial\Omega \text{ or } y\in\partial\Omega
\end{cases}$$

== Spectral theory ==
To derive a formal expression for the heat kernel on an arbitrary domain, consider the Dirichlet problem in a connected domain (or manifold with boundary) U. Let λ_{n} be the eigenvalues for the Dirichlet problem of the Laplacian
$$\begin{cases}
\Delta \phi + \lambda \phi = 0 & \text{in } U,\\
\phi=0 & \text{on }\ \partial U.
\end{cases}$$
Let ϕ_{n} denote the associated eigenfunctions, normalized to be orthonormal in L^{2}(U). The inverse Dirichlet Laplacian Δ^{−1} is a compact and selfadjoint operator, and so the spectral theorem implies that the eigenvalues of Δ satisfy
$$0 < \lambda_1 \le \lambda_2\le \lambda_3\le\cdots,\quad \lambda_n\to\infty.$$
The heat kernel has the following expression:
$$K(t,x,y) = \sum_{n=0}^\infty e^{-\lambda_n t}\phi_n(x)\phi_n(y).$$
Formally differentiating the series under the sign of the summation shows that this should satisfy the heat equation. However, convergence and regularity of the series are quite delicate.

The heat kernel is also sometimes identified with the associated integral transform, defined for compactly supported smooth ϕ by
$$T\phi = \int_\Omega K(t,x,y)\phi(y)\,dy.$$
The spectral mapping theorem gives a representation of T in the form the semigroup

$$T = e^{t\Delta}.$$

There are several geometric results on heat kernels on manifolds; say, short-time asymptotics, long-time asymptotics, and upper/lower bounds of Gaussian type.

== See also ==
- Heat kernel signature
- Heat kernel regularization
- Mehler kernel
- Minakshisundaram–Pleijel zeta function
- Weierstrass transform § Generalizations
