= Namal Lake =

- نمل جھیل (Urdu)
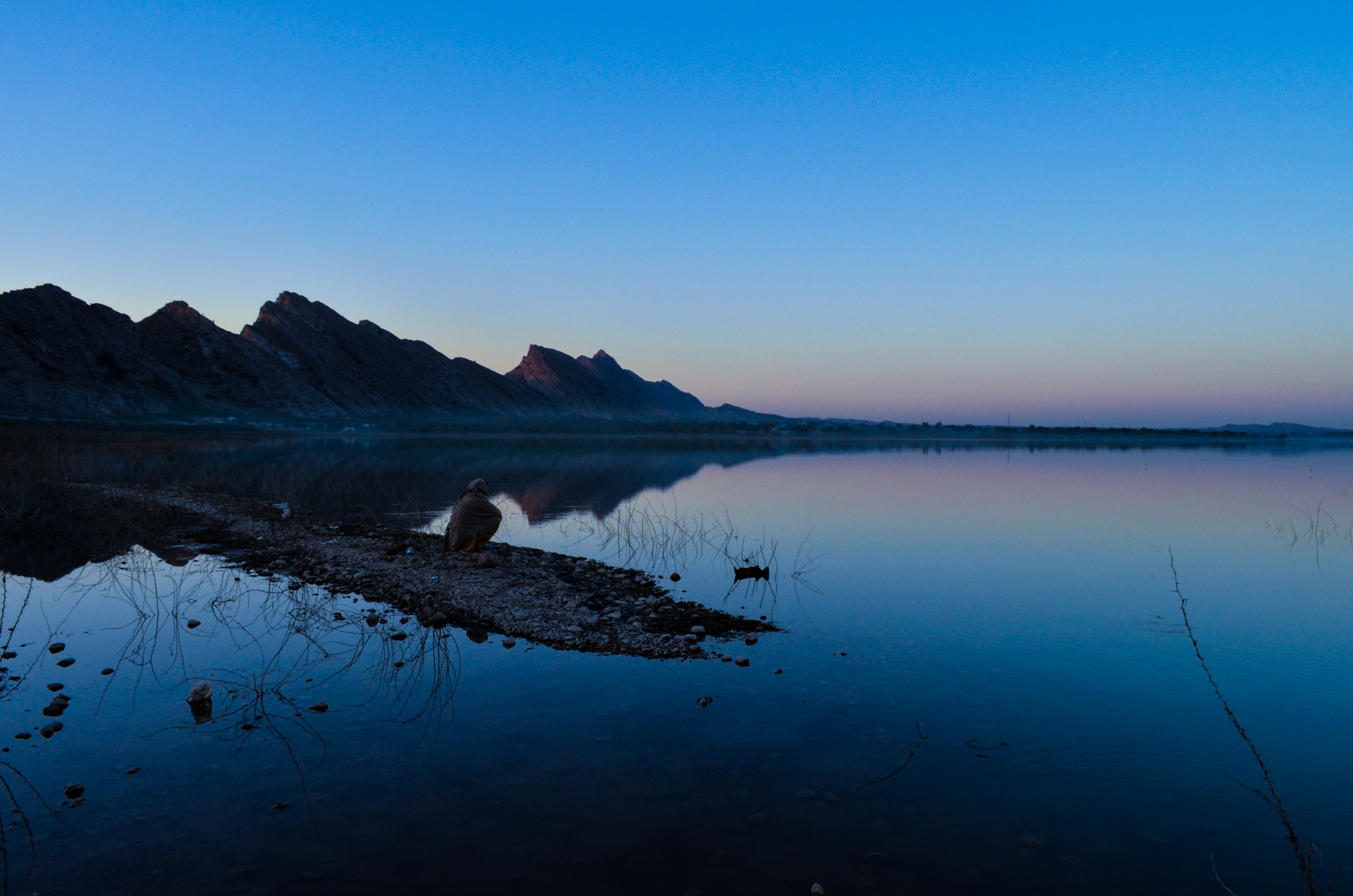
- A view of Namal Lake in the evening

- Location in Punjab, Pakistan
- Location: Namal Valley, Mianwali District, Punjab, Pakistan
- Coordinates: 32°41′24″N 71°48′05″E
- Type: Reservoir with gravity dam
- Etymology: Namal means priceless in English
- Part of: Salt Range Wetlands Complex (SRWC)
- Catchment area: 164 mi^{2} (420 km^{2})
- Basin countries: Pakistan
- Designation: Game Reserve
- Built: 1913
- Surface area: 480 ha (4.8 km^{2})
- Water volume: 630×10^{6} ft^{3} (0.018 km^{3}) (Average); 2,100×10^{6} ft^{3} (0.059 km^{3}) (Maximum)
- Settlements: Namal, Rikhi

Namal Lake (Urdu: نمل جھیل) is a man-made lake located near Rikhi, a village on one corner of the Namal valley in Mianwali District, Punjab, Pakistan. It was formed following the construction of Namal Dam in 1913 (113 years ago). Namal Dam is situated some 32 km (20 mi) from Mianwali city.

The lake has a surface area of 5.5 km^{2} (2.1 sq mi). There are mountains on its western and southern sides. On the other two sides are agricultural areas. It serves as a picnic spot for tourists from nearby areas, and functions as a habitat for waterfowl, Russian ducks, and Siberian cranes that migrate to the area during the winter months.

== History ==
In 1913, British engineers built a dam on Namal lake to address the scarcity of irrigation and drinking water for Mianwali city. Overflow handling was accomplished by releasing water through the sluice gates, rather than relying solely on a large spillway, although spillways were retained as a secondary safety measure. A valve tower controlled diversion of water into the associated irrigation canal system. Multiple sulphur springs were uncovered during construction which created a significant flow of water containing hydrogen sulfide gas. The springs required continuous management during construction but were ultimately contained and safely routed downstream.

The dam was formally inaugurated on 2 December 1913 by Lieutenant-Governor Sir Michael O’Dwyer. At the ceremony, it was named the “Dane Dam” in recognition of Sir Louis Dane’s role in advancing the project.

Over time, the development of the Thal Canal system and widespread use of groundwater abstraction through tube wells reduced the dam’s role in regional irrigation. The gates of the dam are repaired by the irrigation department regularly but without enthusiasm. The hill torrents and rains fill the Namal Lake round the year. Due to a drought-like situation in the country, this lake dried in 2022, which is the first incident of its kind in the last 100 years.

== Namal Canal ==
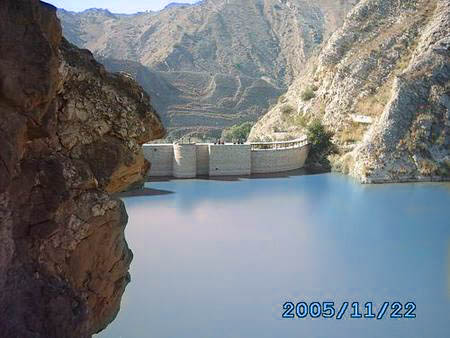
Namal dam

The Namal Canal was opened in December 1913. It received the Namal water from a lake of dam constructed across a gorge canal between Namal and Musakhel. The tail of the canal was at Mianwali, where it conveyed water to lands in the Civil Station. The canal was included under schedule-1 of the Minor Canals Act of 1905 by Punjab Government notification No. 84, dated 9th June 1914.

== See also ==
- List of lakes of Pakistan
- Namal Institute
