= Mianwali =

City in Punjab, Pakistan

Mianwali مِيانوالى
- City
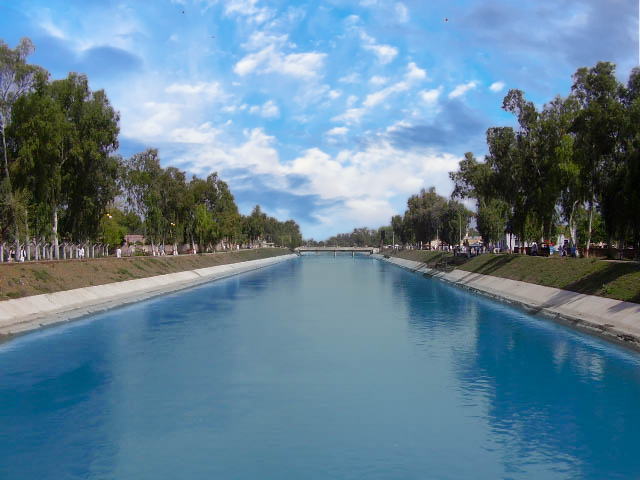
- Thal Canal from the main bridge of Mianwali City.

- Location within Punjab, Pakistan Location within Pakistan
- Coordinates: 32°35′7″N 71°32′37″E
- Country: Pakistan
- Province: (Punjab, Pakistan) Punjab
- Division: Sargodha
- District: Mianwali

Government
  - Type: Municipal Committee
  - Chairman: Vacant
  - Vice Chairman: Vacant
  - MNA(s): Vacant (NA-89 Mianwali-I); Vacant (NA-90 Mianwali-II)
- Elevation: 210 m (690 ft)

Population (2023)
  - City: 129,500
  - Rank: 94th in Pakistan
- Time zone: UTC+5 (PST)
- Calling code: 0459

Mianwali (Note: Urdu: مِيانوالى) is the capital city of Mianwali District in Punjab, Pakistan. Located to the east of the Indus River, the city is irrigated by the Thal Canal.

== Etymology ==
The name Mianwali literally means the "Land of the Mian". According to the local tradition, this name was originally given to a hamlet by a Sufi Qadiriyya saint Shaikh Mian Ali, who migrated from Baghdad and settled in the area in the 16th-century. Gradually the town, originally known as Kachchi, came to be known as Mianwali.

== History ==
The city of Mianwali was originally founded in the 16th-century by Shaikh Mian Ali, as a small village. The municipality of Mianwali was created in 1875, during the British colonial period. The British had made the town of Mianwali as tehsil headquarters of Bannu District, then part of Dera Ismail Khan Division of Punjab province. In 1901 it became headquarters of Mianwali District when it was carved out of Bannu District after the creation of Northwest Frontier Province. It had a population of 3,591 according to the 1901 census of India, which rose to 31,398 people in 1961.

== Geography ==
The city of Mianwali is located in North-west region of the Punjab. The city is located near to the Chashma lake to south west and Namal Lake to its north east. The Chasma lake is home to the Chasma Barrage, that houses a 184 MW power station.

== Infrastructure ==
The Chashma Nuclear Power Plant (or CHASNUPP), is a large commercial nuclear power plant located in the vicinities of Chashma colony in Mianwali District Punjab in Pakistan. Officially known as Chashma Nuclear Power Complex, the nuclear power plant is generating energy for industrial usage with four nuclear reactors with one being in planning phase in cooperation with the China. Supported by the International Atomic Energy Agency (IAEA) and Department of Energy of the United States.

It was established in 2000, the Chashma Nuclear Power Plant became operational, when it joined the nation's grid system with China National Nuclear Corporation overseeing the grid connections of the power plant. In 2004, the China National Nuclear Corporation was awarded contract for building a second unit based on the first reactor, followed by contracting for two more reactors in 2011.

PAF Base M.M. Alam is a Pakistan Air Force airbase located at Mianwali, in the Punjab province of Pakistan. The base is named after Muhammad Mahmood Alam. It primarily serves as the Fighter converter base for the Pakistan Air Force.

Mianwali is the only district in Pakistan with two barrages: Chashma and Jinnah.

Originally a World War II airstrip, it was decided that Mianwali would be upgraded into a satellite airbase for PAF Base Mushaf (then PAF Base Sargodha) during the 1965 Indo-Pak War to act as an alternate recovery airfield. The airbase was again upgraded to a permanent operational airbase in August 1974, although construction of facilities was not completed for another three years.

== Education ==
The Namal University is a private university about 20 min drive from the city of Mianwali. The university is located on 30 km, Talagang Mianwali Road near Namal Lake. Initially it was established as an affiliate college of the University of Bradford, UK. In 2019, Namal College acquired degree awarding status and thus became Namal University. There are further plans to turn the small campus into an education city. Construction is already underway.

== Demographics ==
Population

Historical population

Year	Pop.	±% p.a.
1951	23,340	—
1961	31,398	+3.01%
1972	48,304	+3.99%
1981	59,159	+2.28%

Year	Pop.	±% p.a.
1998	80,171	+1.80%
2017	118,865	+2.09%
2023	129,500	+1.44%

According to the 2023 census, Mianwali city has an urban population of 129,500. The literacy rate of urban population of Mianwali Tehsil in 2023 was 77.9%, considerably less than other urban cities in Punjab.

Languages

Languages of Mianwali MC (2023 Census)
1. Saraiki (86.9%)
2. Punjabi (5.10%)
3. Pashto (3.90%)
4. Urdu (3.80%)
5. Others (0.30%)

== See also ==
- List of cities in Pakistan by population
- List of cities of Punjab, Pakistan by Area
