= Shape analysis (digital geometry) =

This article describes shape analysis to analyze and process geometric shapes.

== Description ==
Shape analysis is the (mostly) automatic analysis of geometric shapes, for example using a computer to detect similarly shaped objects in a database or parts that fit together. For a computer to automatically analyze and process geometric shapes, the objects have to be represented in a digital form. Most commonly a boundary representation is used to describe the object with its boundary (usually the outer shell, see also 3D model). However, other volume based representations (e.g. constructive solid geometry) or point based representations (point clouds) can be used to represent shape.

Once the objects are given, either by modeling (computer-aided design), by scanning (3D scanner) or by extracting shape from 2D or 3D images, they have to be simplified before a comparison can be achieved. The simplified representation is often called a shape descriptor (or fingerprint, signature). These simplified representations try to carry most of the important information, while being easier to handle, to store and to compare than the shapes directly. A complete shape descriptor is a representation that can be used to completely reconstruct the original object (for example the medial axis transform).

== Application fields ==
Shape analysis is used in many application fields:

- archeology for example, to find similar objects or missing parts
- architecture for example, to identify objects that spatially fit into a specific space
- medical imaging to understand shape changes related to illness or aid surgical planning
- virtual environments or on the 3D model market to identify objects for copyright purposes
- security applications such as face recognition
- entertainment industry (movies, games) to construct and process geometric models or animations
- computer-aided design and computer-aided manufacturing to process and to compare designs of mechanical parts or design objects.

== Shape descriptors ==
Shape descriptors can be classified by their invariance with respect to the transformations allowed in the associated shape definition. Many descriptors are invariant with respect to congruency, meaning that congruent shapes (shapes that could be translated, rotated and mirrored) will have the same descriptor (for example moment or spherical harmonic based descriptors or Procrustes analysis operating on point clouds).

Another class of shape descriptors (called intrinsic shape descriptors) is invariant with respect to isometry. These descriptors do not change with different isometric embeddings of the shape. Their advantage is that they can be applied nicely to deformable objects (e.g. a person in different body postures) as these deformations do not involve much stretching but are in fact near-isometric. Such descriptors are commonly based on geodesic distance measures along the surface of an object or on other isometry invariant characteristics such as the Laplace–Beltrami spectrum (see also spectral shape analysis).

There are other shape descriptors, such as graph-based descriptors like the medial axis or the Reeb graph that capture geometric and/or topological information and simplify the shape representation but can not be as easily compared as descriptors that represent shape as a vector of numbers.

From this discussion it becomes clear, that different shape descriptors target different aspects of shape and can be used for a specific application. Therefore, depending on the application, it is necessary to analyze how well a descriptor captures the features of interest.

== See also ==
- List of geometric shapes
- Spectral shape analysis
- Discrete Morse theory
- Discrete differential geometry
- Topological data analysis
- Equidimensional
