= Medial axis =

Points with more than one closest boundary point

An ellipse (red), its evolute (blue), and its medial axis (green). The symmetry set, a super-set of the medial axis, is the green and yellow curves. One bi-tangent circle is shown.

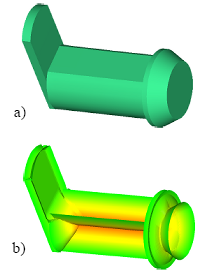
(a) A simple 3d object. (b) Its medial axis transform. The colors represent the distance from the medial axis to the object's boundary.

The medial axis of an object is the set of all points having more than one closest point on the object's boundary. Originally referred to as the topological skeleton, it was introduced in 1967 by Harry Blum as a tool for biological shape recognition. In mathematics the closure of the medial axis is known as the cut locus.

In 2D, the medial axis of a subset S which is bounded by planar curve C is the locus of the centers of circles that are tangent to curve C in two or more points, where all such circles are contained in S. (It follows that the medial axis itself is contained in S.) The medial axis of a simple polygon is a tree whose leaves are the vertices of the polygon, and whose edges are either straight segments or arcs of parabolas.

The medial axis together with the associated radius function of the maximally inscribed discs is called the medial axis transform (MAT). The medial axis transform is a complete shape descriptor (see also shape analysis), meaning that it can be used to reconstruct the shape of the original domain.

The medial axis is a subset of the symmetry set, which is defined similarly, except that it also includes circles not contained in S. (Hence, the symmetry set of S generally extends to infinity, similar to the Voronoi diagram of a point set.)

The medial axis generalizes to k-dimensional hypersurfaces by replacing 2D circles with k-dimension hyperspheres. The 2D medial axis is useful for character and object recognition, while the 3D medial axis has applications in surface reconstruction for physical models, and for dimensional reduction of complex models. In any dimension, the medial axis of a bounded open set is homotopy equivalent to the given set.

If S is given by a unit speed parametrisation $\gamma:\mathbf{R}\to\mathbf{R}^2$, and $\underline{T}(t) = {d\gamma\over dt}$ is the unit tangent vector at each point. Then there will be a bitangent circle with center c and radius r if

- $(c-\gamma(s))\cdot\underline{T}(s)=(c-\gamma(t))\cdot\underline{T}(t)=0,$
- $|c-\gamma(s)|=|c-\gamma(t)|=r.\,$

For most curves, the symmetry set will form a one-dimensional curve and can contain cusps. The symmetry set has end points corresponding to the vertices of S.

== See also ==
- Grassfire transform
- Local feature size
- Straight skeleton
- Voronoi diagram – which can be regarded as a discrete form of the medial axis.
