= Namal =

Coordinates: 32°40′10″N 71°48′45″E

Namal نمل
- Town and union council
- Interactive map of Namal نمل
- Country: Pakistan
- Region: Khudri
- District: Mianwali District
- Time zone: UTC+5 (PST)

Namal (Urdu: نمل), is a town and union council, an administrative subdivision, of Mianwali District in the Punjab province of Pakistan. It is part of Mianwali Tehsil and is located at 32°40'10N 71°48'45E. Namal is a combination of two Punjabi word "Na" mean No and "Mul" mean price. So Namal means "The most valuable land" or "The land for which no one can pay the price". In Urdu it means "Anmool"(انمول). This name was given by old residents of here. No doubt this area was "Anmool" as there were 120 wells of drinking water in the valley some hundred years ago.

This area, known as Namal Valley (وادی نمل) has been very ancient and inhabited for many centuries, which is evidenced by the oldest cemetery of Namal on the banks of the lake and the decayed graves here show how old this area is. There is a well-known tradition that before the British era, the ruler of this area was Raja Sarkap, who was very cruel.

== History ==
The 1915 Gazetteer of Mianwali, in a section entitled "Architectural Objects and Remain-Ruins of Sirkapp Fort", described the Namal area as follows:

Overlooking the village site of Nammal in the Khudri is a ridge of great natural strength, cut off on three sides by hill torrents. On the top of this ridge there are extensive ruins of what is said to have been the stronghold of Sirkapp, Raja of the country, who was a contemporary of Raja Risalu of Sialkot, by whom he was vanquished. The outer wall of the fort still exists in part in a dilapidated condition, but the enclosure, which must once have contained accommodation for a fairly large garrison, is now one mass of fallen houses and piles of hewn or chiselled stones . The series of lifts, made for carrying water from the bed of the stream to the top of the hill, have left their marks.
