= Jīvaka =

Personal physician of the Buddha and Indian King Bimbisara

Jīvaka Komārabhacca/Kaumārabhṛtya
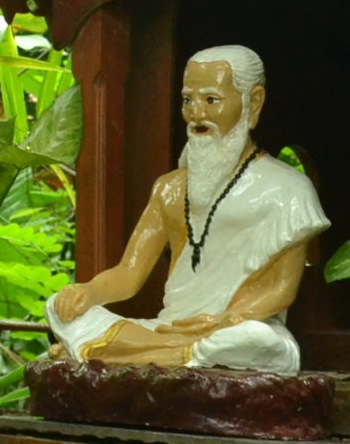
- Thai image of Jīvaka, wearing prayer beads and a white robe

Personal life
- Born: Rājagṛha, Magadha
- Died: Rājagṛha, Magadha
- Parent(s): Father: Unidentified (Pāli tradition), Prince Abhaya (Dharmaguptaka tradition) or King Bimbisāra (other textual traditions); mother: Salāvatī (Pāli tradition) or Āmrapālī (other textual traditions)
- Education: Takṣaśilā
- Known for: Indian traditional medicine, Thai massage
- Other names: Medicine King, Thrice-crowned Physician, Kumārabhūta

Religious life
- Profession: Physician, healer

Senior posting
- Teacher: The Buddha, Ātreya Punarvasu
- Post: Personal physician to the Buddha, King Bimbisāra, and King Ajatashatru

Jīvaka (Pali: Jīvaka Komārabhacca; Sanskrit: Jīvaka Kaumārabhṛtya) was the personal physician (Sanskrit: vaidya) of the Buddha and the Indian King Bimbisāra. He lived in Rājagṛha, present-day Rajgir, in the 5th century BCE. Sometimes described as the "Medicine King" (pinyin: yi wang) and "Thrice Crowned physician" he figures prominently in legendary accounts in Asia as a model healer, and is honoured as such by traditional healers in several Asian countries.

Accounts about Jīvaka can be found in Early Buddhist Texts in many textual traditions such as the Pāli and Mūlasarvāstivāda traditions, as well as later Buddhist discourses and devotional Avadāna texts. Textual traditions agree that Jīvaka was born as a foundling of a courtesan (gaṇikā), but not who his parents were exactly. Regardless, Jīvaka was found and raised by people from the royal court of King Bimbisāra. As he grew up, Jīvaka decided to travel to Takṣaśilā, to learn traditional medicine from a well-respected teacher. He turned out to be a promising student, and after seven years, started his healing profession in Rājagṛha. His medical feats gained him a reputation and he was quickly appointed as the personal physician of King Bimbisāra and the Buddha. As Jīvaka came more into contact with the Buddha, he became an important supporter of the religion and eventually founded the Jīvakarāma monastery. Later, Bimbisāra was killed by his son Ajatashatru, who usurped the throne. Eventually, Jīvaka was instrumental in bringing him to see the Buddha, to whom the new king repented the deeds he had done.

In the texts, Jīvaka is depicted performing complicated medical procedures, including those that could be interpreted as brain surgery. Scholars are in debate to which extent these depictions have historical value. Regardless, Jīvaka is honoured throughout Asian history by Buddhists, and to some extent by healers outside of Buddhism, as a model physician and Buddhist saint. Several medieval medical texts and procedures in India and China are attributed to him. Up until the present day, Jīvaka is honoured by Indians and Thai as a patron of traditional medicine, and he has a central role in all ceremonies involving Thai traditional medicine. Furthermore, Jīvaka's legendary persona has had an important role in helping to proselytise and legitimise Buddhism. Some of the details of Jīvaka's accounts were adjusted to fit the local milieus in which they were passed on. The Jīvakarāma monastery was identified by the Chinese pilgrim Xuan Zang in the 7th century, and it was excavated in the 19th century. Presently, it is one of the oldest Buddhist monasteries with archaeological remains still in existence.

== Sources ==
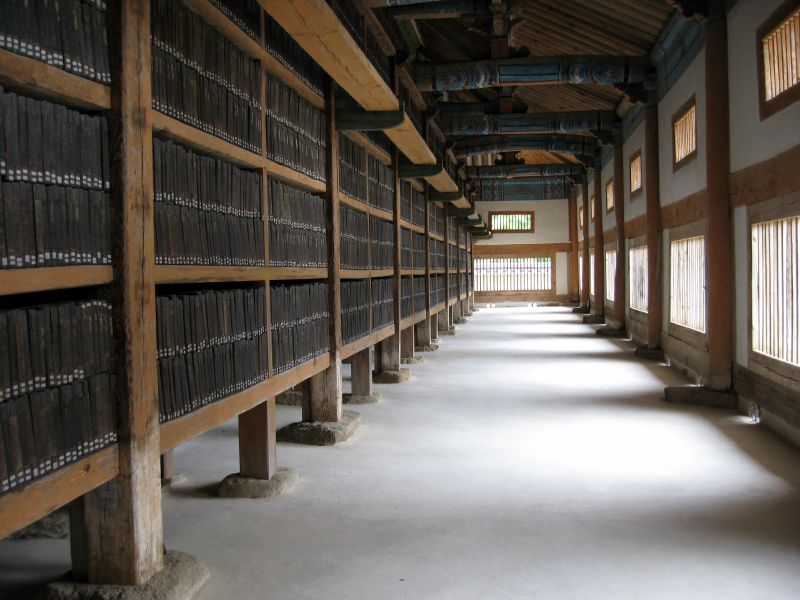
In the Chinese canon of Buddhist scriptures, numerous texts can be found about Jīvaka.

The life of Jīvaka is described in several early Buddhist textual traditions, that is, in the Pāli language, Chinese (from the Dharmaguptaka, Mahīśāsaka and Sarvāstivāda traditions, all translated from Indic texts in the 5th century CE), Tibetan (Mūlasarvāstivāda) and Sanskrit texts. (Note: The texts of the Mahāsaṃghika tradition about Jīvaka are fragmented.) Jīvaka's story can be found in the texts of monastic discipline (Pāli and Sanskrit: Vinaya) of which the oldest stratum can be dated back to the first half of the 4th century BCE. This stratum includes rules and regulations about medicine, also relating the life and work of Jīvaka, and can be found in various textual traditions.

Furthermore, in the Chinese canon of Buddhist scriptures, two separate discourses (Sanskrit: sūtra) can be found that are not part of the Vinaya, titled the Āmrapālī and Jīvaka Sūtra (known as T. 554) and the similarly titled Āmrapālī and Jīvaka Avadāna Sūtra (T. 553). The latter two discourses originate from before the 5th century CE and between 7th and 10th century respectively, both translated from a Sanskrit or Central Asian source. Traditionally, the two translations were attributed to An Shigao (148–180 CE), but this was probably an attempt to make them look more ancient and legitimate. Historian C. Pierce Salguero argues that they were probably based on a translation made by Zhu Fahu (233–±308 CE), as well as early Vinaya and 5th-century apocryphal material. Whereas the Vinaya accounts are intended for a monastic audience, the two Jīvaka Sūtras appear to be more popular versions of the account, meant for a wider lay audience. The T. 554 sūtra most likely incorporated and sometimes replaced the early Vinaya accounts in the Mahīśāsaka and Sarvāstivāda canons, some of which have hardly been passed down as part of the Vinaya, and can therefore only be found within that sūtra. The other T. 553 sūtra is most likely based on the T. 554, but has been expanded using material from the Dharmaguptaka Vinaya.

Besides these sources, several Avadāna texts also contain accounts about Jīvaka. There are also numerous references to him in Indian literature that is not Buddhist, such as the Māṭharavṛtti, a commentary to the Sāṃkhyasūtra, and the satirical poems of Kṣemendra, the 11th-century Kashmiri poet.

Salguero and fellow historian Kenneth Zysk have compared the different recensions of the story and have argued that none of them are the original text, and thus the original narrative cannot be known. Instead, they argue that the different narratives were adjusted to fit with local traditions. For example, Salguero argues that the medieval Jīvaka Sūtras that are not part of the Vinaya were written based on much indigenous knowledge of Chinese medicine: some of the healing methods Jīvaka uses, both in the Jīvaka Sūtras and the Vinaya texts, are more Chinese than Indian, and many motifs in his biography are drawn from legends of other famous Chinese physicians. Zysk notes that the Pāli recension is more practical, whereas the traditions influenced by Mahāyāna teachings deploy more magical and miraculous motifs. He also observes that the Tibetan and Sanskrit accounts depict more treatments that appear traditional Indian (Āyurveda) in nature. Each recension has its own regional character in understanding the diseases and having Jīvaka heal them, although there are also many similarities.

== Accounts ==
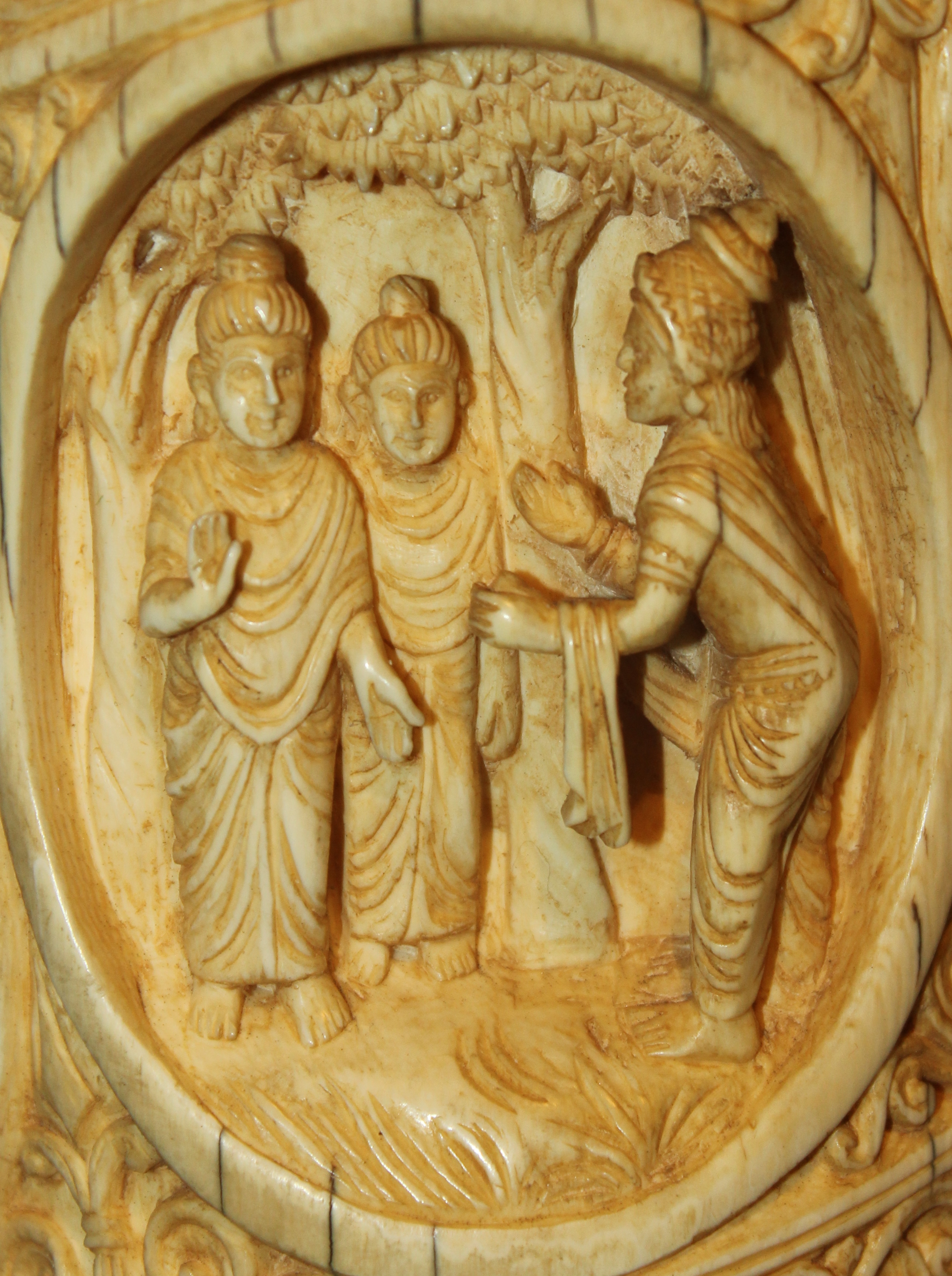
King Bimbisāra welcoming the Buddha. Carved ivory tusk in the National Museum, New Delhi, India.

Jīvaka is described in Buddhist texts as a contemporary of the Buddha, who most scholars date to the 5th century BCE. There are significant differences in how Jīvaka's early life is rendered according to the different textual traditions. In what appears to be the earliest version of the narrative, Jīvaka is described as a foundling discarded by a courtesan with no royal blood, and was later found and raised in the court by Prince Abhaya. In later versions, the story has been embellished to appeal to a wider audience, as Jīvaka's mother is identified with the courtesan of divine origin and Buddhist disciple Āmrapālī, and the previously unnamed father becomes none other than King Bimbisāra. Furthermore, some versions of the story attempt to show that Jīvaka is the real "Medicine King", a title used for other legendary healers such as the Chinese healers Bian Que and Hua Tuo. Many motifs in these accounts point in this direction: for example, the Jīvaka Sūtras state that Jīvaka was born with acupuncture needles and herbs in his hand, which is used as proof that Jīvaka is superior to other Chinese healers. In the Sanskrit and Tibetan version, Jīvaka is recognised and named the "Medicine King" by the court on three occasion, each time after a medical miracle. He is therefore also described as the "Thrice-crowned Physician".

=== The foundling ===
Texts from the earliest, Pāli tradition, as well as the Chinese Dharmaguptaka Vinaya and the T. 553 sūtra, describe that Jīvaka was born in Rājagṛha (present-day Rajgir) as a child of a gaṇikā (Sanskrit: gaṇikā; in the Pāli and Dharmaguptaka canons this was not Āmrapālī, but Salāvatī), who had him discarded on a trash heap by a slave. (Note: Buddhologist Jonathan Silk makes note of a passage in the commentary to the Dhammapada, which states that prostitutes had little use for sons, because they passed on their livelihood through their daughters. Historian Y.B. Singh says that the child would have damaged the reputation of the courtesan and thus her source of income.) He was later seen by a prince called Abhaya, son of King Bimbisāra, who asked whether the child was still alive. When the people responded that it was, he decided to raise him and named him "he who is alive" (Pali: jīvati), for having survived the ordeal. The Pāli, Tibetan and Sanskrit traditions explain that his second name became Komārabhacca, because he is raised by a prince (Pali: kumāra), but scholars have suggested the name is more likely related to the Kaumārabhṛtya: ancient Indian obstetrics and pediatrics, one of the eight branches of the Āyurveda. As he grew up, Jīvaka learnt about his humble origins, and determined to find himself good education to compensate for his background. Without Prince Abhaya's awareness, he went to learn medicine at an ancient place of learning called Takṣaśilā (what the Greeks called Taxila), presently identified with a city near Islamabad, Pakistan.

=== The prince ===
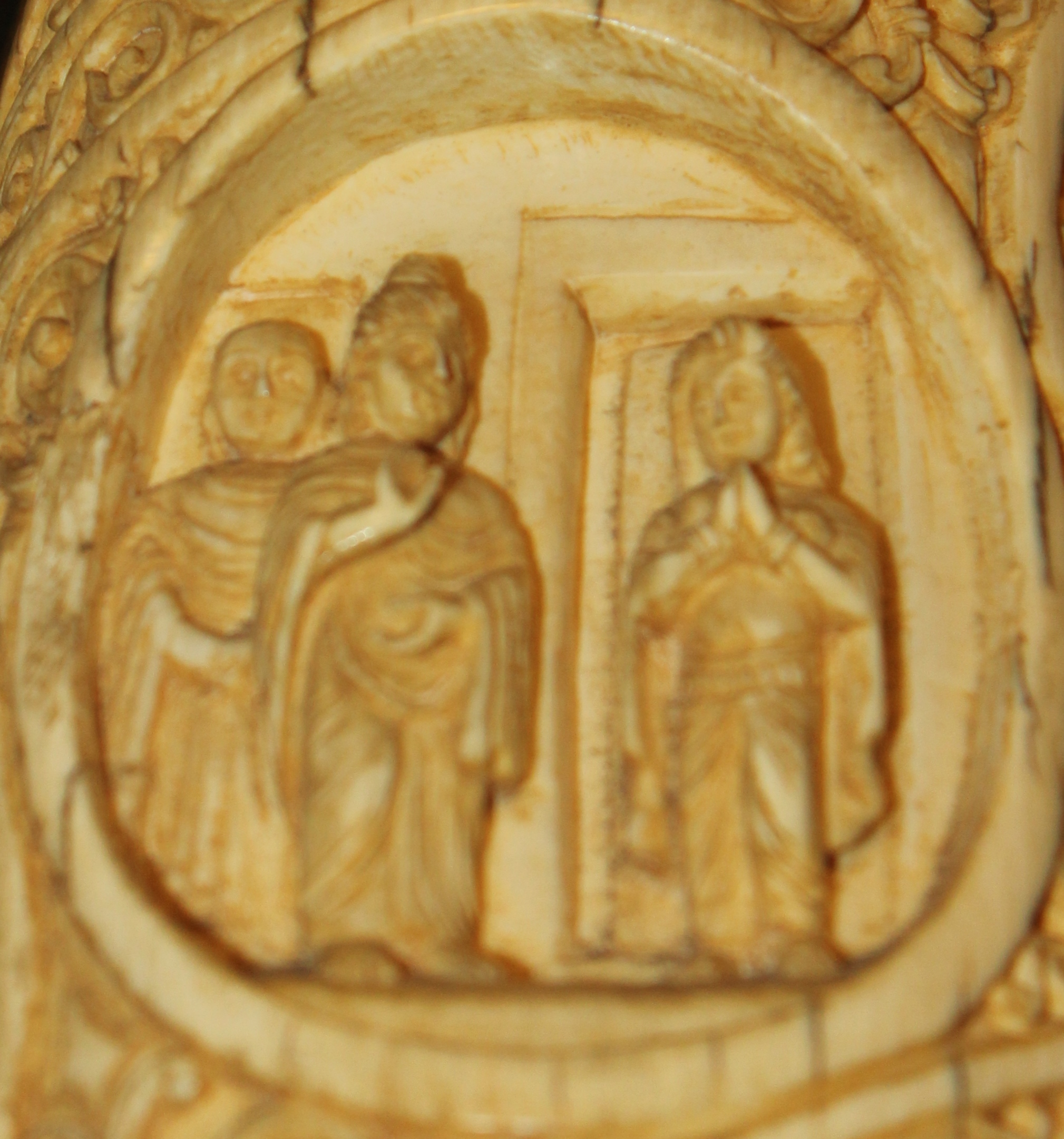
Ivory tusk depicting Āmrapālī saluting the Buddha.

Sanskrit texts and early Tibetan translations in the Mūlasarvāstivāda tradition state that Jīvaka was born as an illegitimate child of King Bimbisāra and a merchant's wife, who in the Chinese Jīvaka Sūtras is identified with the courtesan Āmrapālī. In the Sanskrit and Tibetan recension, however, the wife of the merchant remains unnamed, whereas Āmrapālī is considered to be the mother of Prince Abhaya instead of Jīvaka. The Sanskrit and Tibetan texts, as well the T. 554 sūtra, explain that the king had an illicit affair with the wife and later she informed him that she was pregnant. The king told the mother that if the child should turn out male, she should bring it to him to be raised in court. When it was born, she had the child placed in front of the palace in a chest. The king had the chest brought in and asked whether the child was still alive. When his servants responded that it was, he called it "he who is alive" (Sanskrit and Pali: jīvaka). The king had the child raised in the court by a person called Zho-nu Jigmed in the Tibetan version of the story, and in the court the child's interest in medicine was sparked when he saw some vaidyas (physicians) visit. He therefore decided to train as a physician in Takṣaśilā. In the Dharmaguptaka Vinaya and the Chinese Jīvaka Sūtras, Jīvaka considered his medical teachers in the court inferior and demonstrated his superior medical knowledge, after which he decided to further his studies in Takṣaśilā. During that time, Takṣaśilā was under Achaemenid rule, following the Achaemenid conquest of the Indus Valley circa 515 BCE.

=== The heart-exposing disciple ===
Texts in the Chinese tradition relate that Jīvaka was a crown prince in a kingdom in Central India. When the king died, his younger brother prepared an army to battle Jīvaka. But Jīvaka said to his brother that he had not much interest in the throne, because his mind was focused on the Buddha instead. He exposed his chest, showing a Buddha image engraved on his heart. The younger brother was impressed and called off his army. Because of this story, Jīvaka is called the 'Heart-exposing Arhat' (pinyin: Kaixin Luohan).

In all versions of the story, Jīvaka gave up his claim to the throne to study in Takṣaśilā. He was probably sixteen when he went there.

=== Life in Takṣaśilā ===
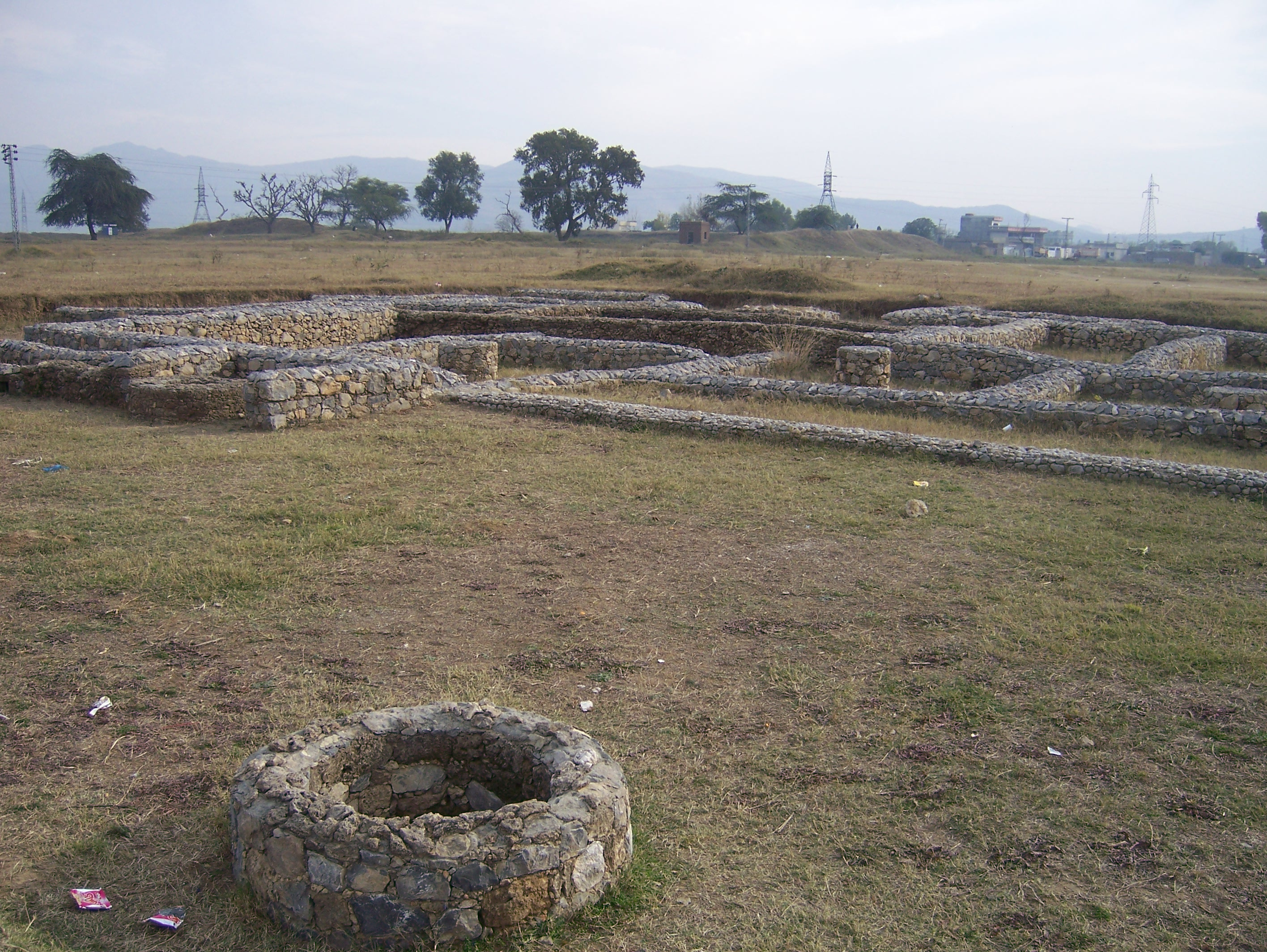
Ruins of Achaemenid city of Taxila, Bhir Mound archaeological site, 6th century BCE.

He was trained for seven years in Takṣaśilā by a ṛṣi (seer) called Ātreya Punarvasu, (Note: The Pāli version of the narrative does not identify who Jīvaka's teacher is.) which Tibetan texts say used to be the physician of Bimbisāra's father.

Jīvaka learned the classical Āyurvedic medical treatises of the time, such as the Caraka Saṃhitā (attributed to Ātreya) and the Suśruta Saṃhitā, although some later treatments of Jīvaka also point at other medieval traditions of knowledge. Ātreya helped Jīvaka build up his observation skills. Jīvaka became known for his powers of observation, as depicted in many stories. In one account, Jīvaka looked at the footprint of an elephant and was able to describe the rider of the elephant in great detail, just basing himself on the elephants' footprint. Tibetan texts do state that Jīvaka suffered from jealous fellow-students, however, who accused Ātreya of favouring him, because he was from the court. In the Pāli and Chinese version of the story, Ātreya then sent Jīvaka and his fellow pupils to look for any plant in the forest that did not have medicinal qualities. Jīvaka returned disappointed, however, telling Ātreya that he could not find a single plant of which he did not recognise its medicinal qualities. When Ātreya was satisfied with this progress, he gave Jīvaka a bit of money and sent him off, but not before acknowledging him as his next successor.

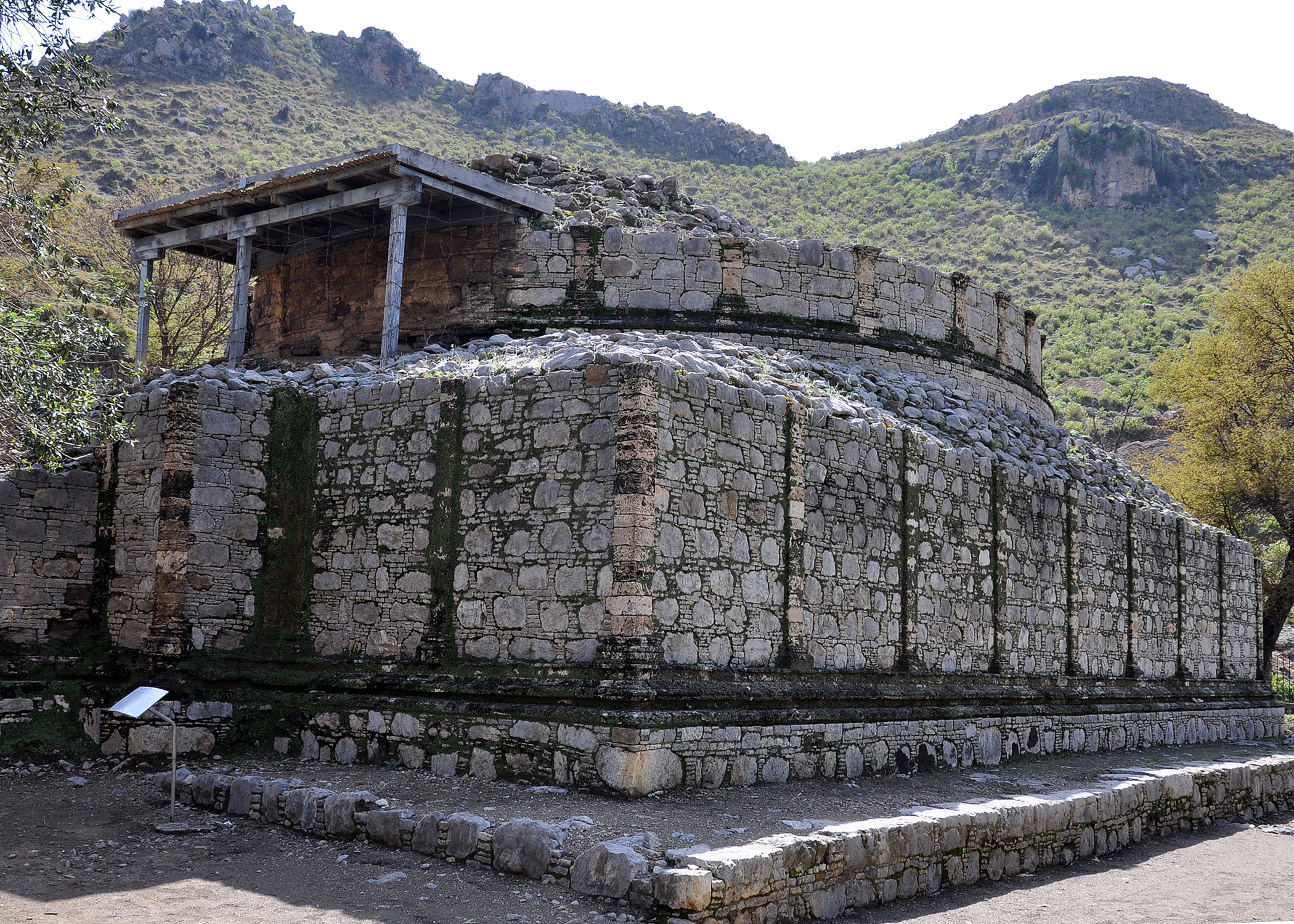
The remains of the Piplan site at Taxila.

In the Sanskrit and Tibetan recensions, however, the test of the forest is done before accepting Jīvaka in Takṣaśila, as opposed to the exam at the end of his studies. After Jīvaka passed the test, was admitted and learnt at the centre for several years, he started to demonstrate his medical superiority and was recognised as such by Ātreya. He finished his studies with Ātreya and continued his studies at the city of Bhadraṅkara in Vidarbha, where he studied the textbook called the Sarvabhūtaruta, which may refer to a book about magical chants and dharanis. After that, he traveled further and came in possession of a miraculous object that helped him to see through the human body and discover any ailments. In this account, which could also be found in the Jīvaka Sūtras, Jīvaka came across a man carrying wooden sticks. In some accounts, the man seemed to suffer terribly because of the effect of the wooden sticks, being emaciated and sweating; in other accounts, the wooden sticks which the man carried allowed any by-passers to see through his back. Regardless, Jīvaka bought the sticks and found that, according to most of the Chinese texts, one of the sticks originated from a miraculous "Medicine King Tree" (pinyin: yao wang shu): the tree of Bhaiṣajrayājan, who later Mahāyāna texts would describe as a bodhisattva, a Buddha-to-be, focused on healing. The Tibetan and Sanskrit version, however, relates that there was a gem hidden between the sticks which was the source of the miracles. Regardless, the miraculous object enables him to see through a patient's body and diagnose his illness, as the object "illuminates his inside as a lamp lights up a house". These accounts may have led to a myth about an ancient "ultrasound probe", as imagined in medieval Buddhist kingdoms of Asia.

=== Life as a healer ===
Observation skills

"Jivaka remarked, 'Those are footprints of an elephant, not male but female, blind of the right eye, and about to bring forth young today. On it a woman was riding. She too is blind of the right eye, and she will bear a son today.' Asked by Atreya and his astonished students to explain, Jivaka mentioned, 'being brought up in a royal family, I know that footprints of male elephants are round, whereas those of female elephants are oblong'. He explained further that, 'she had eaten grass only from the left side of the road, and that she was pressing hardest towards the right side, suggesting that the foal would be a male'. Lastly, he explained, 'the woman riding the elephant was blind in the right eye because she picked flowers that grew on the left side upon descending, and the heels of her feet made deeper than usual impressions, the backward lean suggested that she was pregnant.'"

— Quoted in Singh, J.; Desai, M. S.; Pandav, C. S.; Desai, S. P., 2011

According to the Pāli texts, on his way back to Rājagṛha, Jīvaka needed money for his travelling expenses, so he was forced to start working in Sāketa. A rich merchant (Pali: seṭṭhī) asked for help for his wife, but since many physicians had failed to heal her, Jīvaka was reluctant and stated that he would ask for no fee if his treatment was unsuccessful. He successfully treated her though and was rewarded generously. After his return in Rājagṛha, he gave his first earnings to Prince Abhaya, who refused these but had Jīvaka work in the palace. He quickly became wealthy because of his service to influential patients, including King Bimbisāra. Although he received good payments from his wealthy customers, the texts state he also treated poor patients for free. When King Bimibisāra suffered from an anal fistula, he called upon the help of Jīvaka. After curing the king of his fistula, Jīvaka was appointed by the king as his personal physician and as a personal physician to the Buddha.

Jīvaka was depicted healing a misplacement of intestines, performing an operation of trepanning on a patient, removing an intracranial mass and performing nose surgery. In T. 553, as well as in the Dharmaguptaka Vinaya, he healed a "disease of the head" by treating the patient with ghee through the nose, (Note: Analyzing this story from a scientific medical standpoint, medical historians Thomas and Patrick Chen speculate that Jīvaka may have used ghee as an emollient, and decreased the inflammation of the sinuses which caused the headache.) and he is depicted in Pāli texts as performing laparotomy, removing post-traumatic volvulus and a cesarean section on patients under some form of anaesthesia. This and some other descriptions of Jīvaka's medical procedures follow the protocol of the Suśruta and Charaka Saṃhitās closely. The Jīvaka Sūtras describe that he also performed acupuncture, but this must have been a Chinese interpolation in the narrative, since this was a Chinese practice.

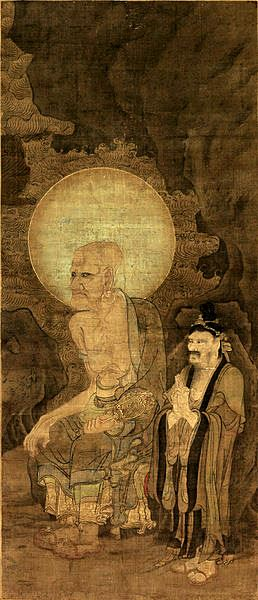
Painting of Jīvaka (pictured left) by Jin Dashou, Song Dynasty (10th–13th century), China

In a more psychological case, Jīvaka treated another seṭṭhī, this time with a brain condition. After having performed brain surgery, he told the patient to lie still on the right side for seven years, on the left side for another seven years and on his back for yet another seven years. The patient lied on each side for seven days and could not lie still for longer, standing up from his sleeping place. He confessed this to Jīvaka, who revealed to him that he ordered him seven years on each side just to persuade him to complete the full seven days on each side.

In another case described in the Mūlasarvāstivāda texts, King Bimbisāra lent Jīvaka to King Pradyota (Pali: Candappajjoti), the King of Ujjeni, to heal his jaundice. Jīvaka knew through the power of his magical wood that Pradyota was poisoned by a snake and could only be healed by using ghee, which Pradyota hated. Praydyota was prone to anger and Jīvaka was in doubt whether he should try to heal him. Consulting the Buddha, the Buddha said that Jīvaka had taken a vow in a previous life that he would heal people's bodies, whereas the Buddha had taken a vow that he would heal people's minds—Jīvaka then decided to attempt to heal the king. Therefore, Jīvaka gave a decoction to the king containing ghee, without him being aware. Anticipating the king's response, Jīvaka fled the palace on one of the king's elephants. When King Pradyota became furious as Jīvaka expected, he sent one of his servants to catch and bring back Jīvaka. The servant caught up with Jīvaka, but as they were eating, Jīvaka secretly served him a strong purgative. By the time they manage to get back to the palace, King Pradyota was healed and no longer angry, rewarding Jīvaka generously for healing him. (Note: Chen and Chen speculate that when ingested as a fat, ghee can help the gall-bladder to contract and promote choleresis, thereby facilitate the gallstone from passing and causing relief of jaundice.) In the Pāli version, he rewarded him by giving him an expensive cloth, which Jīvaka then offered to the Buddha; in the Mūlasarvāstivāda version, the king rewarded Jīvaka by listening to the teaching of the Buddha, the only payment Jīvaka accepted.

Accounts in medieval Japanese and Chinese literature depict Jīvaka offering baths to the Buddha and dedicating the religious merit to all sentient beings. The story was used in East Asian societies to promote the medicinal and ritual value of bathing, emphasizing the benefits of offering such baths to the monastic community as a form of "medical karma".

Some scholars have pointed to accounts about Jīvaka as evidence of ancient medical practices, with medical historians Thomas and Peter Chen stating that "[i]t is likely that the salient events of Jivaka's life and his medical feats are authentic" and analysing some of Jīvaka's procedures from a viewpoint of scientific medical practice. Salguero is more skeptical, however, and argues that "[m]edical legends simply cannot be considered evidence of medical practice".

=== Role in Buddhism ===
Relief depicting Jīvaka treating the Buddha's foot (below), after the unsuccessful murder attempt by the monk Devadatta (depicted holding a boulder above, right).

Pāli texts often describe Jīvaka giving treatments to the Buddha for several ailments, such as when the Buddha had a cold, and when he was hurt after an attempt on his life by the rebellious monk Devadatta. The latter happened at a park called Maddakucchi, where Devadatta hurled a rock at the Buddha from a cliff. Although the rock was stopped by another rock midway, a splinter hit the Buddha's foot and caused him to bleed, but Jīvaka healed the Buddha. Jīvaka sometimes forgot to finish certain treatments, however. In such cases, the Buddha knew the healer's mind and finished the treatment himself. Jīvaka tried to heal the Buddha using only objects that are regarded as reverential, such as parts of the lotus flower instead of herbs from trees. Tibetan texts stated that Jīvaka very often checked up on the Buddha, up to three times a day. Jīvaka not only cared for the Buddha, but also expressed concern for the monastic community, at one point suggesting the Buddha that he had the monks exercise more often.

Apart from his role as a healer, Jīvaka also developed an interest in the Buddha's teachings. One Pāli text is named after Jīvaka: the Jīvaka Sutta. In this discourse, Jīvaka inquired about how to be a good lay devotee. He also specifically asked why the Buddha ate meat. The Buddha responded that a monk is only allowed to eat meat if the animal is not killed especially for him—apart from that, meat is allowed. He continued by saying that a monk cannot be choosy about the food he is consuming, but should receive and eat food dispassionately, just to sustain his health. The discourse inspired Jīvaka, who decided to dedicate himself as a Buddhist lay person. The Tibetan tradition has another version of Jīvaka's conversion: Jīvaka's pride that he thought he was the best physician in the world obstructed him from accepting the Buddha. The Buddha sent Jīvaka to legendary places to find ingredients, and finally Jīvaka discovered there is still a lot he did not know yet about medicine, and it turned out that the Buddha knew a lot more. When Jīvaka accepted the Buddha as "the supreme of physicians", he was more receptive to the Buddha's teachings and the Buddha started teaching him. Jīvaka took upon himself the five moral precepts.

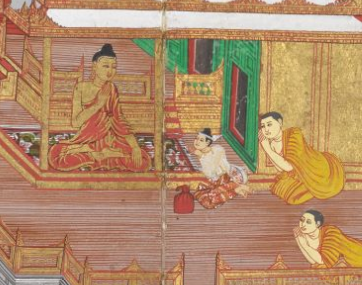
Jīvaka is conversing with the Buddha. Burma, 1875

Pāli texts relate that Jīvaka later attained the state of śrotāpanna, a state preceding enlightenment. Having accomplished this, he started to visit the Buddha twice a week. Since he had to travel quite far for that often, he decided to donate a mango grove close to Rājagṛha and built a monastery there. The monastery was used by monks during the yearly rains retreat. Later on, Jīvaka was the first layman recorded to offer robes to Buddhist monks. It was probably out of health considerations that Jīvaka offered the robes, since before that time, Buddhist monks would usually sew their robes together from pieces of rag left behind, or from corpses, which was less hygienic. At the time of Jīvaka's gift of robes, the Buddha was ill and this illness could be related to lack of hygiene. On a similar note, Jīvaka is described to donate robes made of woollen material, to be used in the winter.

At the end period of the Buddha's ministry, King Bimbisāra was imprisoned by his son Ajatashatru, who usurped the throne. Attempting to starve his own father, Ajatashatru heard that his mother tried to prevent Bimbisāra from starving. According to the Mūlasarvāstivāda texts, Ajatashatru nearly killed his mother out of anger, but was stopped by Jīvaka and a minister, who warned him that he would be considered a casteless outcast (Sanskrit: caṇḍala) if he killed his own mother. Later on, Bimbisāra did starve and died. Ajatashatru developed a tumour after his father's death, and asked Jīvaka to heal it. Jīvaka said he needed the meat of a child to heal the tumour. As Ajatashatru was planning to eat a child, he remembered that he killed his father. When he thought about the killing of his father, the tumour disappeared. Ajatashatru became ashamed of what he had done. Eventually, Jīvaka managed to bring Ajatashatru to see the Buddha to repent his misdeeds. In the Mūlasarvastivāda texts, this happened after Jīvaka raised examples of other evil people that could still be saved despite their misdeeds, and after Jīvaka reminded Ajatashatru that the Buddha was at the end of his life. In the Mahāsaṃghika texts, however, Ajatashatru consulted his ministers about who he should go to look for counsel. Although his ministers recommended to see several other non-Buddhist teachers, eventually Jīvaka suggested the new king to see the Buddha.

In Buddhist texts, the Buddha declared Jīvaka foremost among laypeople in being beloved by people, and the Pāli texts name him as example of someone with unwavering faith in Buddhism. Jīvaka was that widely known for his healing skills, that he could not respond to all the people that want his help. Since Jīvaka gave priority to the Buddhist monastic community, some people needing medical help sought ordination as monks to get it. Jīvaka became aware of this and recommended the Buddha to screen people for diseases before ordaining, which the Buddha eventually did for five diseases.

Although Jīvaka was depicted as showing great respect for the Buddha and concern and help for the monastic community, there was at least one case in which he failed to show respect. This is the case of Paṇṭhaka, a monk who was considered stupid by many. Jīvaka also shared this opinion, and when he invited the Buddha and the monastic community for a meal, Paṇṭhaka was the only monk he left out. The Buddha, arriving for the meal, refused to start eating, insisting that someone fetched Paṇṭhaka. Jīvaka sent a servant to get Paṇṭhaka, but this servant was surprised to find 1,250 Paṇṭhakas walking around the monastery, as Paṇṭhaka brings about a supernatural accomplishment. Eventually, the real Paṇṭhaka joined the meal, but Jīvaka still did not acknowledge the monk's mental prowess. Jīvaka only changed his mind as Paṇṭhaka showed another supernatural accomplishment, stretching his arm very long to help take the Buddha's alms bowl for him. Jīvaka bowed at the monk's feet to request his forgiveness.

== Legacy ==
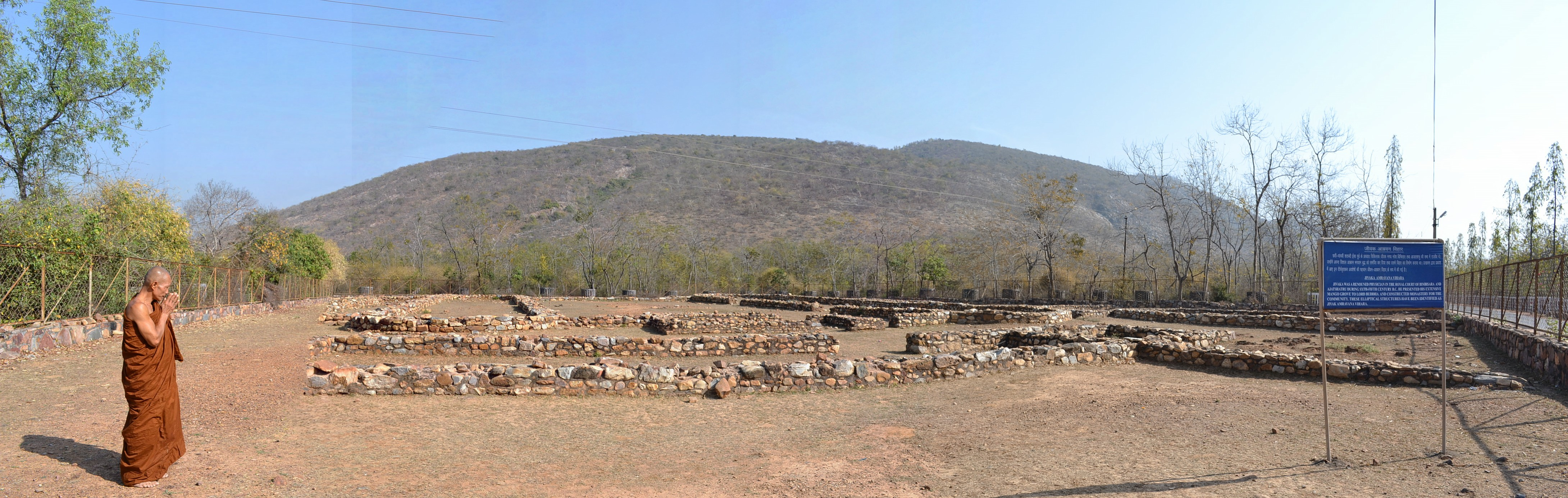
Remains of the Jivakarama Monastery in Rajgir

Medieval Chinese accounts about Jīvaka tend be hagiographic in nature, and were used more in the proselytising of Buddhism than regarded as medical biography. Since healing knowledge and the proselytising of Buddhism were closely connected, praise for Jīvaka's medical prowess also meant praise and legitimisation of Buddhism. In Chinese texts about medicine from the Six Dynasties period (early medieval), Jīvaka figures most prominently of all physicians, and his stories influenced the stories about other legendary physicians, as well as being influenced by their narratives. In East Asia, Jīvaka was associated with gynaecology, and the name Jīvaka is related to ancient female pathology and paediatrics. Several medieval medical formulas were named after him, and he is referred to in numerous medical texts from at least the 4th century CE onward. In 6th-century texts of Chinese pharmacology, the adage "Everything on earth is nothing but medicine" [sic] is attributed to him. In 10th-century Chinese medicine, many treatises were associated with or attributed to Jīvaka. There is also evidence that shows Jīvaka was regarded as an important figure for Indian Āyurvedic medicine: for example, Ḍalhaṇa, an Indian scholar who lived between the 11th and 13th centuries, wrote in a commentary on the Suśruta Saṃhitā that "Jīvaka's compendium" was regarded as an authoritative text on children's diseases, though this text has now been lost. This does not mean that Jīvaka was revered unanimously by all of Asia; several medieval Indian texts such as the Māṭharavṛtti, and the poems of Kṣemedra, depict him, as well as other physicians, as impostors. Among Indian texts, Buddhist texts tend to stand out in that they give much honour to the occupation of the physician, and medical knowledge was highly respected. The former may be related to the doctrine of salvation of Buddhism, in which the Buddha is often described as a doctor that cures the ills of the human race.

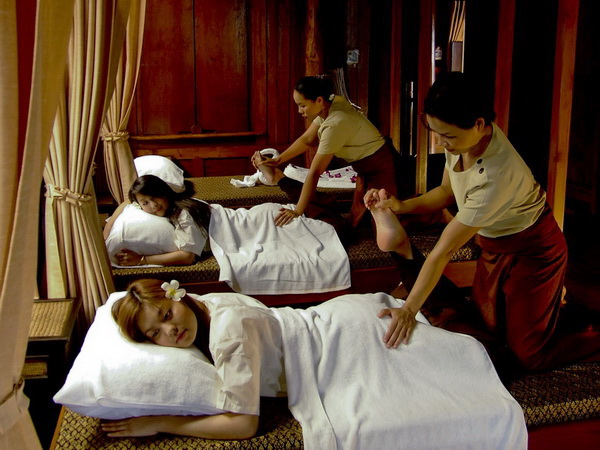
Jīvaka is regarded by Thai people as the creator of traditional Thai massage and medicine.

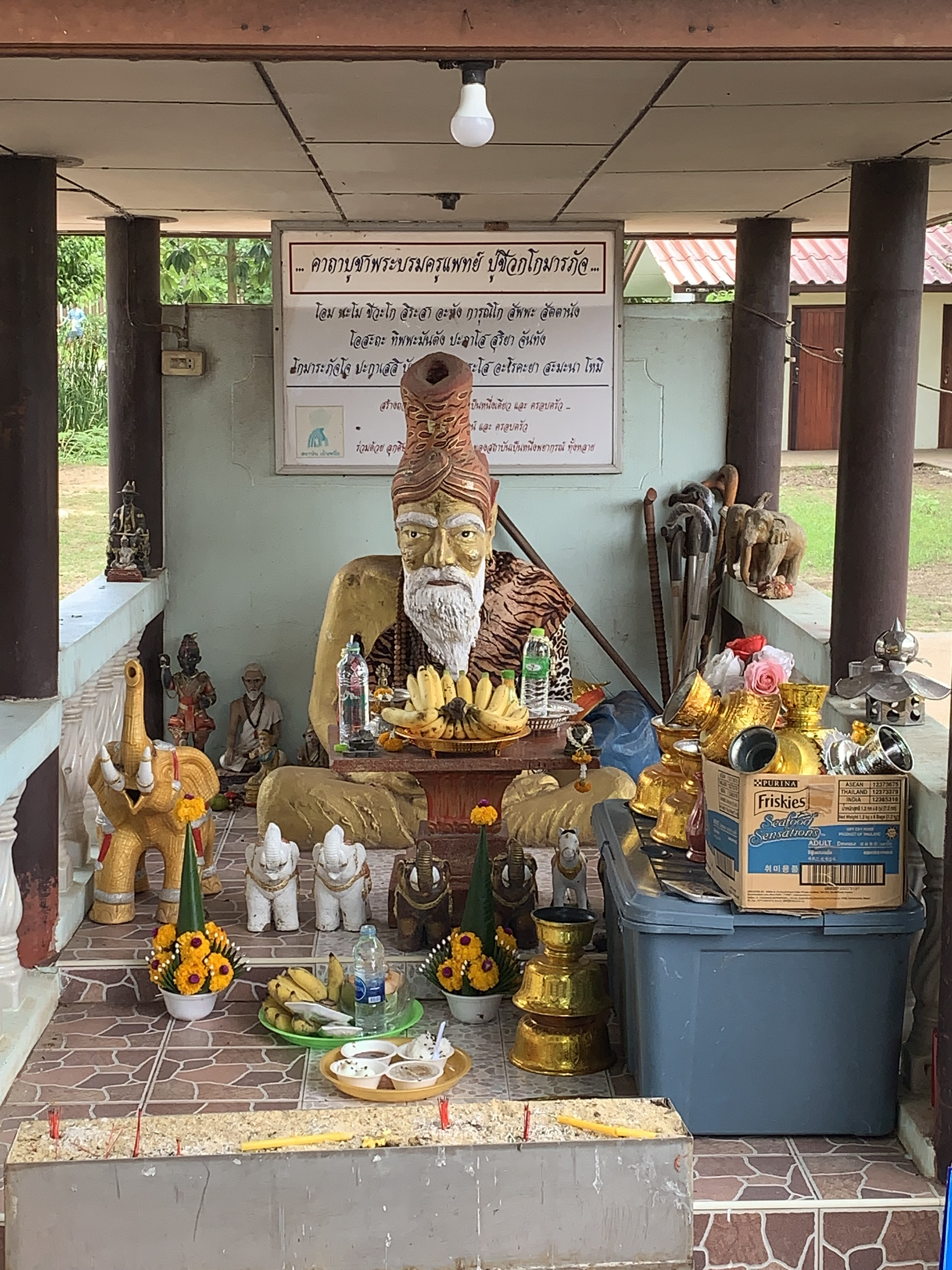
A shrine to Jivaka at Wat Bang Kung temple in Thailand

Jīvaka was and is for many Buddhists and traditional healers an icon and a source of inspiration. The figure of Jīvaka is presented in ancient texts as evidence for the superiority of Buddhism in both the realm of the spiritual as well as the medical. The Jīvaka Sūtras and the Mūlasarvāstivāda version describe that when Jīvaka meets the Buddha, the latter makes a statement that "I treat internal diseases; you treat external diseases", the word treat (pinyin: zhi) in this context also meaning 'to reign over'. Throughout the medieval period, the accounts about Jīvaka were used to legitimate medical practices. In the early Buddhist texts which were translated in Chinese, Jīvaka was deified and described in similar terminology as used for Buddhas and bodhisattvas. He came to be called the "Medicine King", a term used for several legendary Chinese physicians. There is evidence that during the Tang dynasty (7th–10th century), Jīvaka was worshipped along the Silk Road as a patron deity of children's health. Today, Jīvaka is seen by Indians as a patriarch of traditional healing, and is regarded by Thai people as the creator of traditional Thai massage and medicine. Thai people still venerate him to ask for assistance in healing ailments, and he plays a central role in nearly all ceremony that is part of traditional Thai medicine. Stories exist about Jīvaka's purported travels to Thailand.

In the Sanskrit textual traditions, Jīvaka is the ninth of the Sixteen Arhats, disciples that are entrusted to protect the Buddha's teaching until the arising of the next Buddha. He is therefore described in Buddhist texts as still being alive on a mountain peak called Gandhamādana, between India and Sri Lanka. The monastery Jīvaka presented to the Buddhist community came to be known as the Jīvakarāma Vihāra, Jīvakāmravaṇa or Jīvakambavana, and was identified by the Chinese pilgrim Xuan Zang (c. 602–64) with a monastery in Rajgir. The remains were discovered and excavated in the period from 1803 to 1857. The monastery is described by archaeologists as "... one of the earliest monasteries of India dating from the Buddha's time".
