= Hafiz Wala =

Coordinates: 32°27′0″N 71°28′0″E

Hafiz Wala حافظ والا
- Town and union council
- Interactive map of Hafiz Wala حافظ والا
- Country: Pakistan
- Region: Punjab
- District: Mianwali District
- Tehsil: Piplan
- Time zone: UTC+5 (PST)
- Postal code: 42050

Hafiz Wala (Urdu: حافظ والا) is a town of Mianwali District in the Punjab province of Pakistan. It is located in Piplan Tehsil at 32°16'0N 71°26'0E.

== Places ==
Hafiz Wala has a union council, public high schools, Ghala mandi, hospitals, cotton industries and a hospital for cattle. Notable People :-It has some known political people some of which include: Faqeer Abdul Majeed Khan ex-MPA, Saif Sarohi Advocate supreme court Of Pakistan, Engineer Imam Haqani Khan, Squadren Leader Fateh Shair Khan PAF, Ghazi Rehan Ali Tamgha Shujaat, Lt.Naeem Ahmed Khan Shaheed Pak Army, and Rafiullah Shaheed Islamabad police.
