= Musewali =

Coordinates: 32°15′0″N 71°20′0″E

Musewali موسے والی
- Town and union council
- Interactive map of Musewali موسے والی
- Country: Pakistan
- Region: Punjab
- District: Mianwali District
- Tehsil: Piplan
- Time zone: UTC+5 (PST)
- Postal code: 42050

Musewali (Urdu: موسے والی), is a town of Mianwali District in the Punjab province of Pakistan. It is located in Piplan Tehsil at 32°15'0N 71°20'0E
