= Piplan =

City in Punjab, Pakistan

Coordinates: 32°17′N 71°22′E

پِپلاں
- City
- Piplan
- Interactive map of پِپلاں
- Country: Pakistan
- Province: Punjab
- District: Mianwali District

Population (2017 Census of Pakistan)
  - Total: 30,989
- Time zone: UTC+5 (PST)

Piplan (Punjabi, Urdu: پِپلاں) is the main city of Piplan Tehsil in Mianwali District, situated in Punjab, Pakistan.

It is almost 52 km from the district capital Mianwali, which lies to the north. Piplan is surrounded by many other similar towns: To the south are the towns of Musa Wali, Mattha, Churkin, Jhanbir and KalurKot Kalurkot, Bhakkar, to the north are Doaba, Alluwali, Kundian and Mianwali to the east, Hernoli and Hafiz Wala and to the west is the Indus River.

== History ==
The name of Piplan was given historically before the independence of Pakistan in 1947. Many Hindus used to live in Piplan and the name of this town was Peepul or Peepul wala (Peepul: fig tree, regarded as sacred by both Hindus and Buddhists, who call it a "bo tree"). After the independence of Pakistan, the name was changed to Peepul-Aan, now written as Piplan.

== Geography ==
Latitude:32.2867, Longitude:71.3664
Altitude (feet) 647,(meters)185
Time zone: UTC+5

Nearby cities and towns

West
North
East
South
Dost Muhammad Khanwala(2.4 km)
Jal, Punjab (1.8 km)
Liaqatabad (Piplan) (0.5 km)

 Chak No 3/4 ML (9.0 km)

Musewali (2.1 km)
Banda Sardar Khan (2.4 km)
Jal, Punjab] (1.4 km)
Hafiz Wala (7.5 km)
Nuranwala (1.5 km)

[Jhangiwala/Raoji] (7.5 km.)

=== Climate ===
Piplan has extreme weather, as does the whole district of Mianwali. Summer lasts from May to September; June is the hottest month with an average monthly temperature of 42 °C with a maximum of up to 50 °C. In winter, however, the December and January temperature is as low as a 3 to 4 °C average monthly.

Month	Jan	Feb	Mar	Apr	May	Jun	Jul	Aug	Sep	Oct	Nov	Dec	Year
Avg high °C	19	21	26	33	38	45	39	37	37	33	28	21	31
Avg low temperature °C	3	6	12	17	22	27	27	26	23	16	9	4	16
Rainfall in. (Cm)	1.6	2.1	4.1	2.4	1.9	1.8	7.6	11	4.5	0.7	0.1	0.9	38.5
Source: Weatherbase
