= Vichvin Bala =

Vichvin Bala وِچوِن بالا
- Town and Union Council
- Country: Pakistan
- Region: Punjab
- District: Mianwali District
- Tehsil: Piplan
- Chairman: Syed Fayyaz Mahmood
- Time zone: UTC+5 (PST)

Vichvin Bala (Urdu: وِچوِن بالا), is a town and union council, an administrative subdivision, of Mianwali District in the Punjab province of Pakistan. It is part of Piplan Tehsil. It is home to the Sial family, who are one of the most prominent feudal families of the region.
