= Musa Wali =

Musa Wali is a village located south of Piplan on Piplan-Kallurkot Road on the left side of the Indus river. The original village used to be located much west from its present position but the inhabitants have had to shift their village at least twice due to flooding in the Indus. The population is around 10,000 according to 1998 census. Major castes living in Musa Wali are Aaheer and others are Arain, Awan, and Joyia (local Saraiki speaking). The people are mostly farmers.
