= Hernoli =

ہرنولى
- Town
- Harnoli
- Country: Pakistan
- Province: Punjab

Population (2018)
  - Total: 15,669
- Time zone: UTC+5 (PST)

Harnoli (Urdu: ہرنولى) is a town of Mianwali District in the Punjab province of Pakistan. The town is part of Piplan Tehsil and administratively subdivided into two Union councils, one for the urban area and the other for the rural area. It is situated in the southern part of District Mianwali.
