= Dabb Balouchan =

Dabb Balouchan ڈب بلوچاں
- Village and union council
- Country: Pakistan
- Region: Punjab
- District: Mianwali District
- Time zone: UTC+5 (PST)
- Postal code: 42012

Dab Blouchan (Urdu: ڈب بلوچاں) is a village and union council of Mianwali District in the Punjab province of Pakistan. The Union Council is an administrative subdivision of Piplan Tehsil.
