= C. Pierce Salguero =

Scholar of Buddhist medicine

- Occupations: Academic, author

Academic background
- Education: University of Virginia (BA, 1996; MA, 2005); Johns Hopkins School of Medicine (PhD, 2010)

Academic work
- Discipline: Asian history; history of medicine; Buddhist studies; health humanities
- Institutions: Penn State Abington
- Main interests: Buddhist medicine; Asian religions; traditional Asian medicine; Buddhism and health
- Notable works: Translating Buddhist Medicine in Medieval China; A Global History of Buddhism and Medicine; Buddhism and Medicine anthology (2 vols.)
- Website: www.buddhistmedicine.net

Pierce Salguero is an author and scholar of Buddhist medicine. As professor of Asian History and Health Humanities at Penn State University's Abington College, he also serves as the college's program chair for Multidisciplinary Studies and Health Humanities. He has been editor-in-chief of Asian Medicine: Journal of the International Association for the Study of Traditional Asian Medicine since 2016.

Salguero's scholarship focuses on the intersections of Buddhism, medicine, Asian religions, traditional Asian healing systems, and health humanities. His academic books include Translating Buddhist Medicine in Medieval China (2014), A Global History of Buddhism and Medicine (2022), and the two-volume Buddhism and Medicine anthology, comprising Buddhism and Medicine: An Anthology of Premodern Sources (2017) and Buddhism and Medicine: An Anthology of Modern and Contemporary Sources (2019).

Alongside his academic work, Salguero has written books for general readers on Buddhism, Asian spiritual practices, and contemporary spirituality, including Buddhish (2022), A Lamp unto Yourself (2025), and the forthcoming Multidharma.

== Education and career ==
Salguero attended the University of Virginia, from which he earned a Bachelor of Arts in anthropology and cognitive science in 1996 and a Master of Arts in East Asian studies in 2005. He then received a Doctor of Philosophy in the history of medicine from the Johns Hopkins School of Medicine in 2010.

Before entering academia, Salguero worked as a practitioner and teacher of traditional Thai medicine and authored trade books on Thai massage and traditional healing, including Traditional Thai Medicine: Buddhism, Animism, Ayurveda (Hohm Press, 2007; revised as Traditional Thai Medicine: Buddhism, Animism, Yoga, Ayurveda, White Lotus Press, 2016).

At Penn State Abington, Salguero teaches courses in Asian history, Asian religions, the history of medicine, mindfulness, and health humanities.

Since 2016, he has served as editor-in-chief of Asian Medicine: Journal of the International Association for the Study of Traditional Asian Medicine.

== Research ==
Salguero's research examines the historical and contemporary relationship between Buddhism and medicine. His work spans textual history, translation history, and ethnographic fieldwork. Across these methods, he has argued that Buddhist traditions across Asia developed and transmitted substantial bodies of medical knowledge that have often been overlooked in mainstream histories of medicine, and that these materials can be studied as a coherent, though internally diverse, field of "Buddhist medicine".

His early work on medieval China argued that Chinese Buddhist translators and authors did not merely transmit Indian medical ideas into Literary Chinese, but actively interpreted and adapted them for local audiences. He later edited anthologies of translated Buddhist medical sources from multiple Asian languages, intended to make a scattered textual record more accessible to researchers and teachers.

Academic reviews have credited Salguero's work with helping to establish Buddhist medicine as a distinct field of study. In a review of Translating Buddhist Medicine in Medieval China, Frederick Shih-Chung Chen wrote that the book helped locate Buddhist medicine in medieval China "as a subject in its own right" rather than as a subtopic within the history of Chinese medicine. Ronit Yoeli-Tlalim, reviewing A Global History of Buddhism and Medicine in Southeast Asian Studies, wrote that Salguero had "spearheaded many endeavors related to Buddhist medicine for almost two decades". William A. McGrath wrote in Hualin International Journal of Buddhist Studies that Salguero had integrated historical, anthropological, and clinical studies into a unified field of "Buddhist medicine".

Salguero has also conducted ethnographic research on contemporary American Buddhist communities, including Buddhist healthcare and healing practices in Philadelphia. This work has included producing a series of six short documentary films with filmmaker-scholar Lan A. Li.

His recent work has examined Buddhist textual discussions of "meditation sickness", including physical and mental difficulties associated with meditation practice.

== Academic publications ==
Salguero's academic books include Traditional Thai Medicine: Buddhism, Animism, Yoga, Ayurveda, published in revised edition by White Lotus Press in 2016; and A Global History of Buddhism and Medicine, published by Columbia University Press in 2022.

He has also edited or co-edited several collections, including Translating Buddhist Medicine in Medieval China (2014), Buddhism and Medicine: An Anthology of Premodern Sources (2017), Buddhism and Medicine: An Anthology of Modern and Contemporary Sources (2019), Buddhist Healing in Medieval China and Japan (2020), Buddhism and Healing in the Modern World (2024), and Meditation Sickness: A Sourcebook on the Dangers of Buddhist Practice.

His articles have appeared in notable journals, including History of Religions and Journal of Buddhist Ethics.

== General audience writing ==
Alongside his academic publications, Salguero has written books for general readers on Buddhism, Asian spiritual practices, and contemporary spirituality. These include Buddhish: A Guide to the 20 Most Important Buddhist Ideas for the Curious and Skeptical, published by Beacon Press in 2022, and A Lamp unto Yourself: A Beginner's Guide to Asian Spiritual Practices, from Advaita and Buddhism to Yoga and Zen, published by Beacon Press in 2025.

His book Multidharma: A New Map of Awakening for Contemporary Spiritual Explorers is scheduled for publication by Aeon Books in October 2026. The book presents a model of awakening organized around four "threads" or categories of spiritual experience: Emptiness, Oneness, Energy, and Psyche.

== Selected publications ==
=== Academic books ===
- Salguero, C. Pierce, ed. (2014). Translating Buddhist Medicine in Medieval China. University of Pennsylvania Press. ISBN 9780812246117.
- Salguero, C. Pierce (2016). Traditional Thai Medicine: Buddhism, Animism, Yoga, Ayurveda (Revised ed.). Bangkok: White Lotus Press.
- Salguero, C. Pierce, ed. (2017). Buddhism and Medicine: An Anthology of Premodern Sources. Columbia University Press. ISBN 9780231179942.
- Salguero, C. Pierce, ed. (2019). Buddhism and Medicine: An Anthology of Modern and Contemporary Sources. Columbia University Press. ISBN 9780231189361.
- Salguero, C. Pierce; Macomber, Andrew, eds. (2020). Buddhist Healing in Medieval China and Japan. University of Hawaiʻi Press. ISBN 9780824881214.
- Salguero, C. Pierce (2022). A Global History of Buddhism and Medicine. Columbia University Press. ISBN 9780231185271.
- Salguero, C. Pierce; Cheung, Kin; Deane, Susannah, eds. (2024). Buddhism and Healing in the Modern World. University of Hawaiʻi Press. ISBN 9780824897697.
- Salguero, C. Pierce, ed. (2026). Meditation Sickness: A Sourcebook on the Dangers of Buddhist Practice. University of Hawaiʻi Press. ISBN 9798880702633.

=== General audience books ===
- Salguero, C. Pierce (2022). Buddhish: A Guide to the 20 Most Important Buddhist Ideas for the Curious and Skeptical. Beacon Press. ISBN 9780807064566.
- Salguero, C. Pierce (2025). A Lamp unto Yourself: A Beginner's Guide to Asian Spiritual Practices, from Advaita and Buddhism to Yoga and Zen. Beacon Press. ISBN 9780807020395.
- Salguero, C. Pierce (2026). Multidharma: A New Map of Awakening for Contemporary Spiritual Explorers. Aeon Books.

=== Selected articles ===
- Salguero, C. Pierce (2009). "The Buddhist Medicine King in Literary Context: Reconsidering an Early Medieval Example of Indian Influence on Chinese Medicine and Surgery". History of Religions. 48 (3): 183–210.
- Salguero, C. Pierce (2015). "Reexamining the Categories and Canons of Chinese Buddhist Healing" (PDF). Journal of Chinese Buddhist Studies. 28: 35–66.
- Salguero, C. Pierce (2018). "A Missing Link in the History of Chinese Medicine: A Research Note on the Medical Contents in the Chinese Buddhist Taishō Tripiṭaka". East Asian Science, Technology, and Medicine. 47: 93–119.
- Salguero, C. Pierce (2019). "Varieties of Buddhist Healing in Multiethnic Philadelphia". Religions. 10 (1). 48. doi:10.3390/rel10010048.
- Salguero, C. Pierce (2022). "Beyond Mindfulness: Buddhism & Health in the US". Pacific World. Fourth Series. 3.
- Salguero, C. Pierce (2023). "Meditation Sickness in Medieval Chinese Buddhism and the Contemporary West" (PDF). Journal of Buddhist Ethics. 30: 169–211.
