= Traditional Thai massage =

Nuad Thai, traditional Thai massage
- UNESCO Intangible Cultural Heritage
- Country: Thailand
- Reference: 01384
- Region: Asia and the Pacific

Inscription history
- Inscription: 2019 (14th session)
- List: Representative

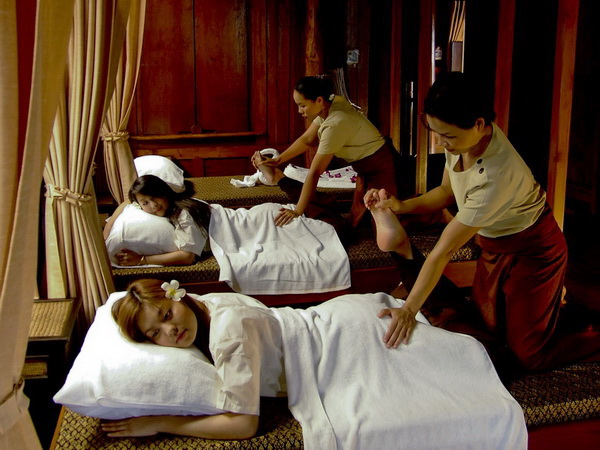
Thai massage

Traditional Thai massage or Thai yoga massage is a traditional therapy combining acupressure, Indian Ayurvedic principles, and assisted yoga postures. In the Thai language, it is usually called nuat phaen thai (นวดแผนไทย, [nûad pʰɛ̌ːn tʰāj], lit. 'Thai-style massage') or nuat phaen boran (นวดแผนโบราณ, [nûad pʰɛ̌ːn bōː.rāːn]; lit. 'ancient-style massage'), though its formal name is nuat thai (นวดไทย, [nûad tʰāj], lit. 'Thai massage') according to the Traditional Thai Medical Professions Act, BE 2556 (2013).

UNESCO added traditional Thai massage to its Cultural Heritage of Humanity list in December 2019.

== Practice ==
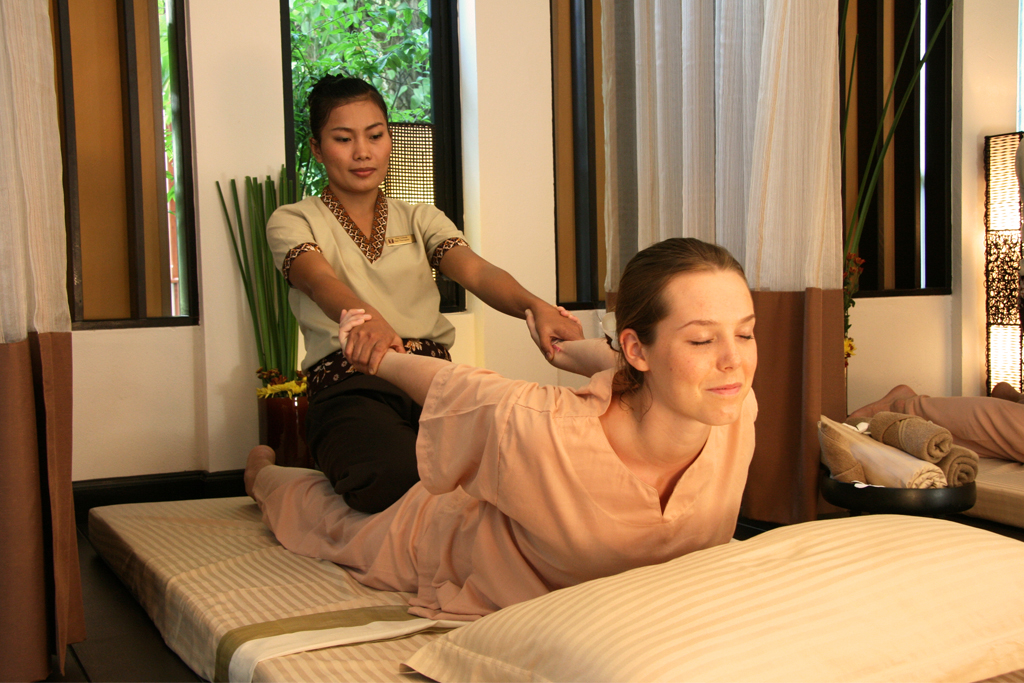
Thai massage posture

Traditional Thai massage combines broad and focused acupressure along "energy lines" called sen, Indian Ayurvedic principles, and assisted yoga postures. Oils and lotions are generally not used, and the recipient wears lightweight and loose clothing during treatment. There is constant body contact between the giver and receiver, but rather than simply rubbing on muscles, the body is compressed, pulled, stretched, and rocked. The concept of metta (loving-kindness), based on Buddhist teachings, is an integral part of this practice. Well-known practitioners also emphasize meditation on the part of the practitioner as integral to the effectiveness of this practice.

== History ==
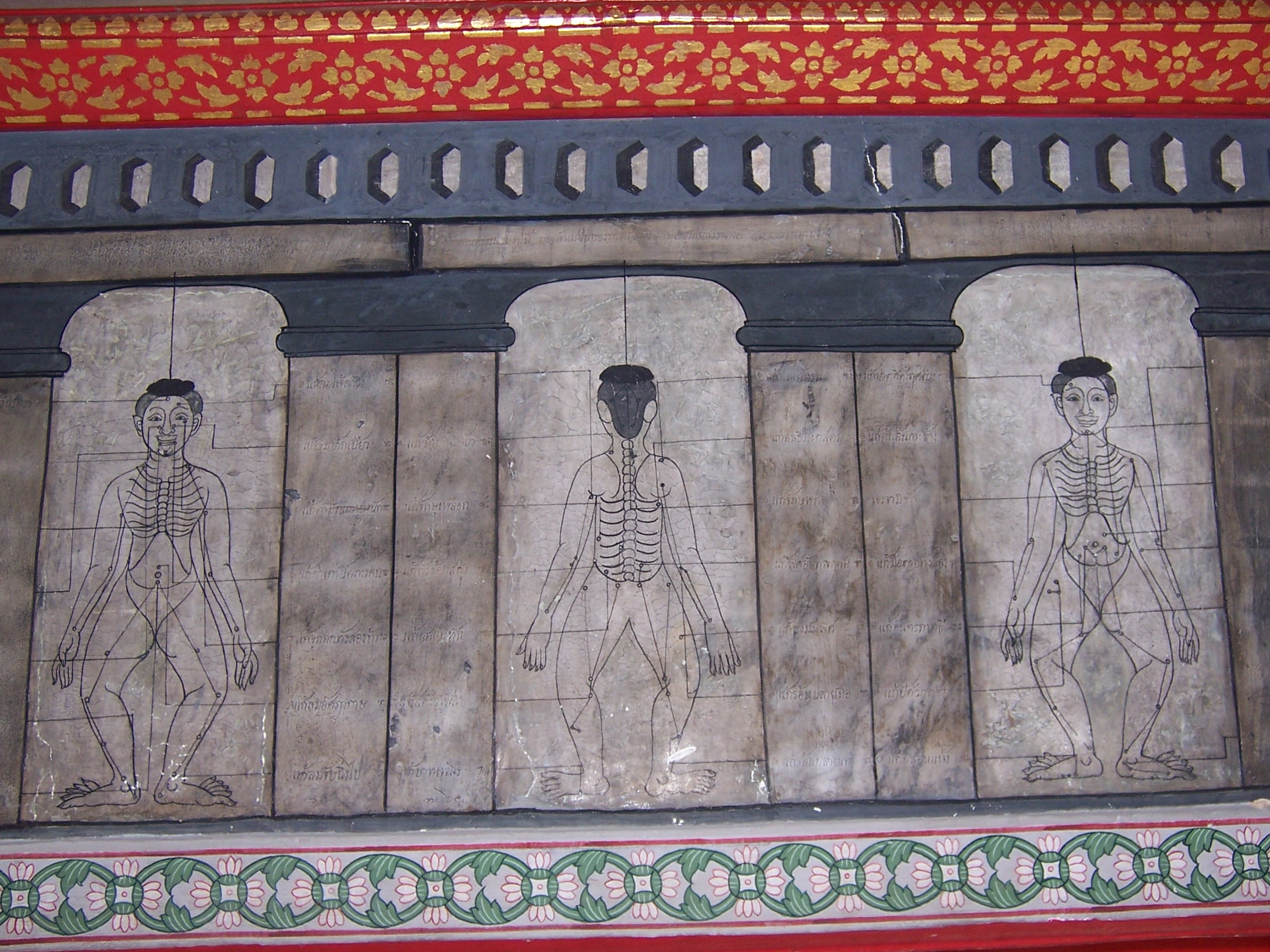
Drawings of acupressure points on sen lines at Wat Pho Temple, Phra Nakhon district, Bangkok

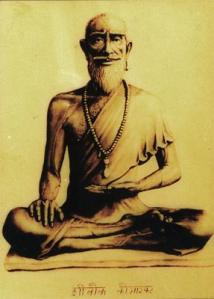
Jīvaka Komārabhacca

Thai massage, like Thai traditional medicine (TTM), is a combination of influences from Indian and Southeast Asian traditions of medicine, and the art as it is practiced today is likely to be the product of a 19th-century synthesis of various ancient healing traditions from all over the kingdom.

The spirit intermediary of traditional Thai massage and Thai medicine is Jīvaka (Thai: ชีวกโกมารภัจจ์, Jīvaka Komarabhācca), who is said in the Pali Buddhist canon to have been the personal physician of the Buddha and the Indian King Bimbisāra over 2,500 years ago. He was recorded in ancient documents as having extraordinary medical skills, for his knowledge of herbal medicine, and for having treated important people of his day, including the Buddha and the royal court himself.

=== Sukhothai Period ===
The oldest historical evidence of massage in Thailand is a stone inscription from the Sukhothai period, discovered at Wat Pa Mamuang in the Sukhothai Historical Park, dating to the reign of King Ramkhamhaeng and King Maha Thammaracha I. The inscription depicts the cultivation of medicinal herbs, the preparation of herbal medicines, and treatment through massage.

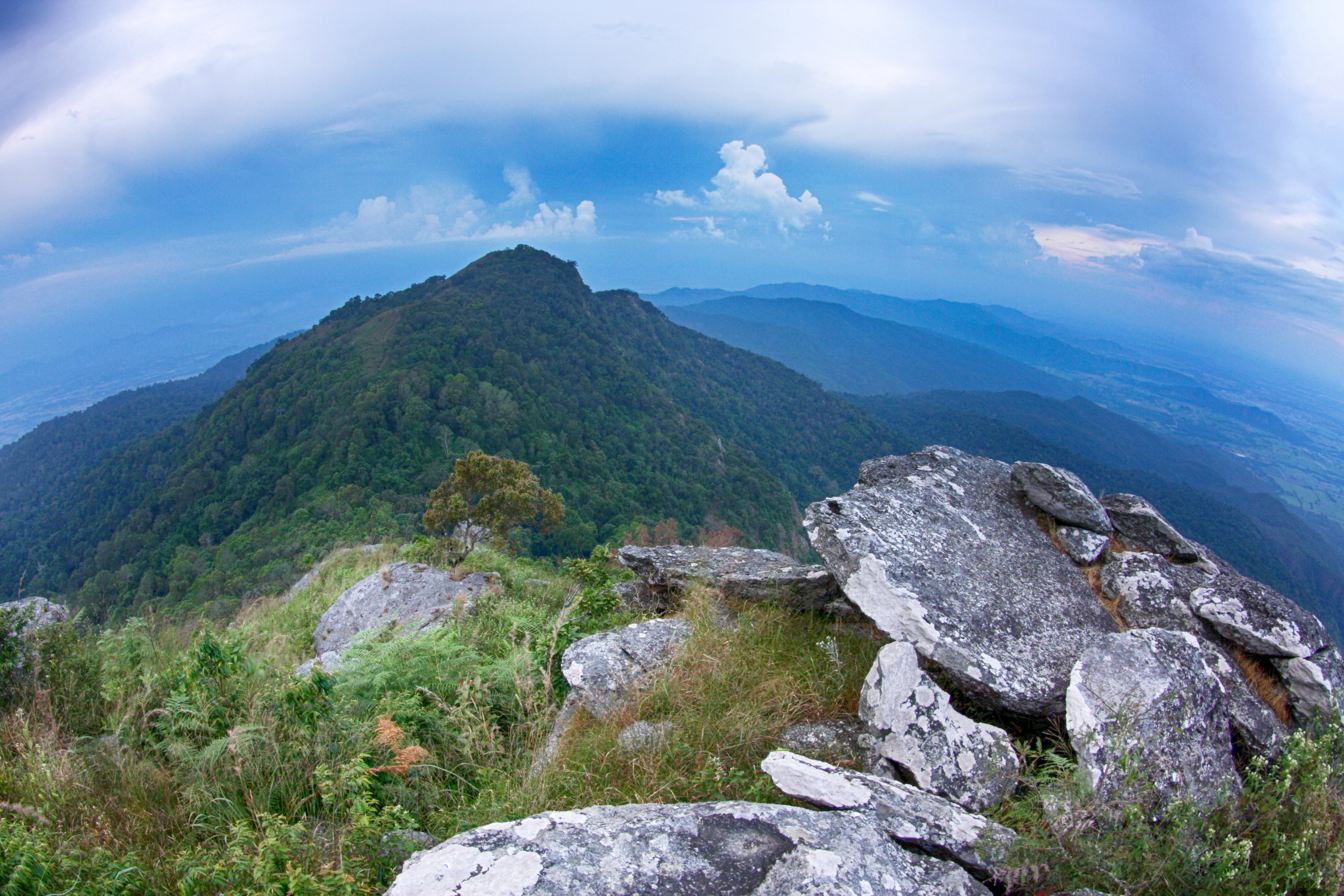
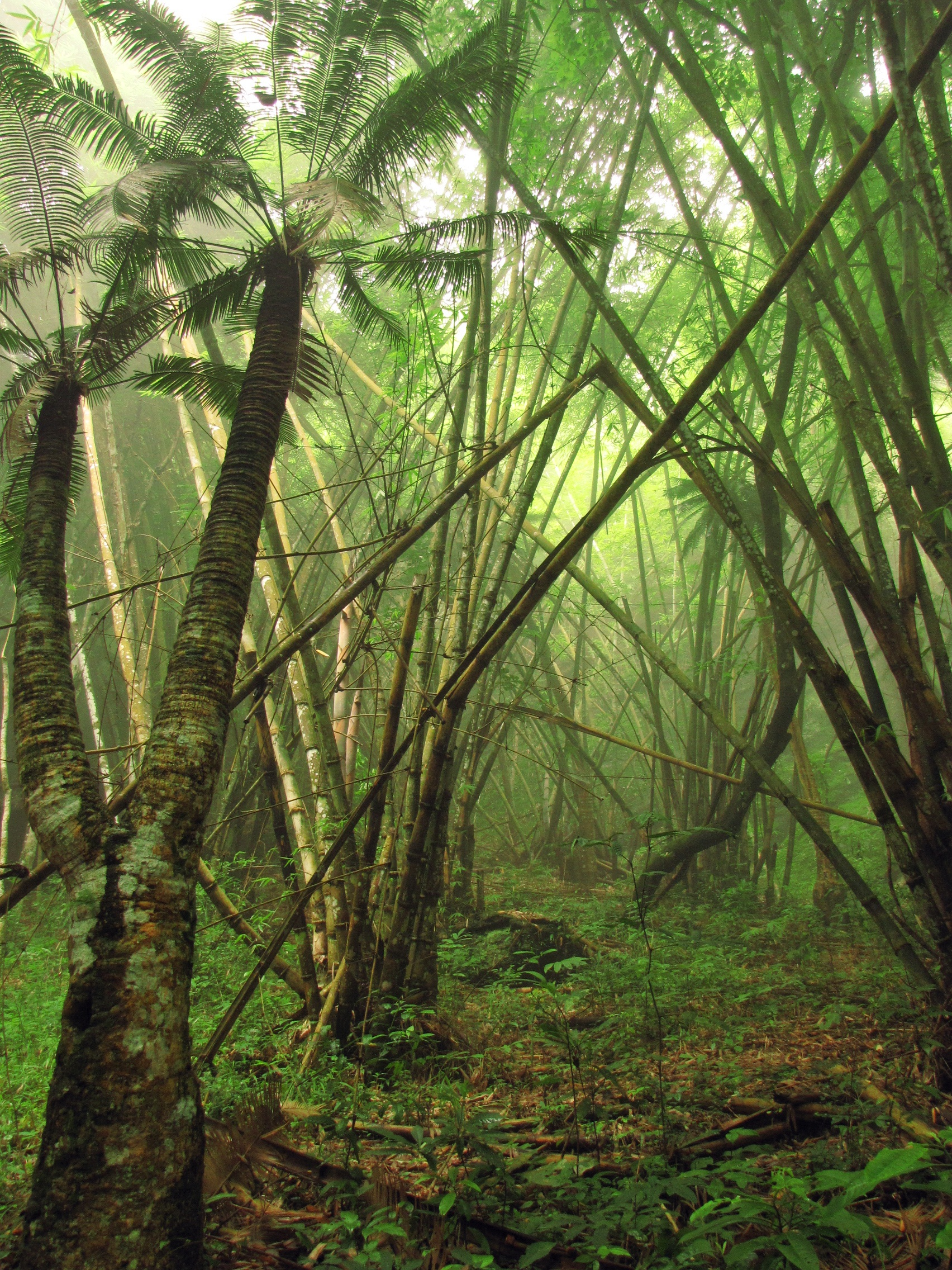
Ramkhamhaeng National Park (Khao Luang)

During the Sukhothai period, a mountain known as Khao Luang, also called the Ramkhamhaeng National Park (Thai: เขาหลวง, อุทยานแห่งชาติรามคำแหง), was designated as a site for gathering and cultivating medicinal herbs, reflecting the traditional knowledge of the Sukhothai people and forming an early foundation of public health in the kingdom.

In the past, this herbal source was regarded as the city's principal source of medicine, divided into two areas: Lum Garden (Thai: สวนลุ่ม), at the foot of the mountain, which supplied herbs for commoners, and Khwan Garden (Thai: สวนขวัญ), higher up the mountain, which supplied herbs for the king, royalty, and the nobility.

=== Ayutthaya Period ===
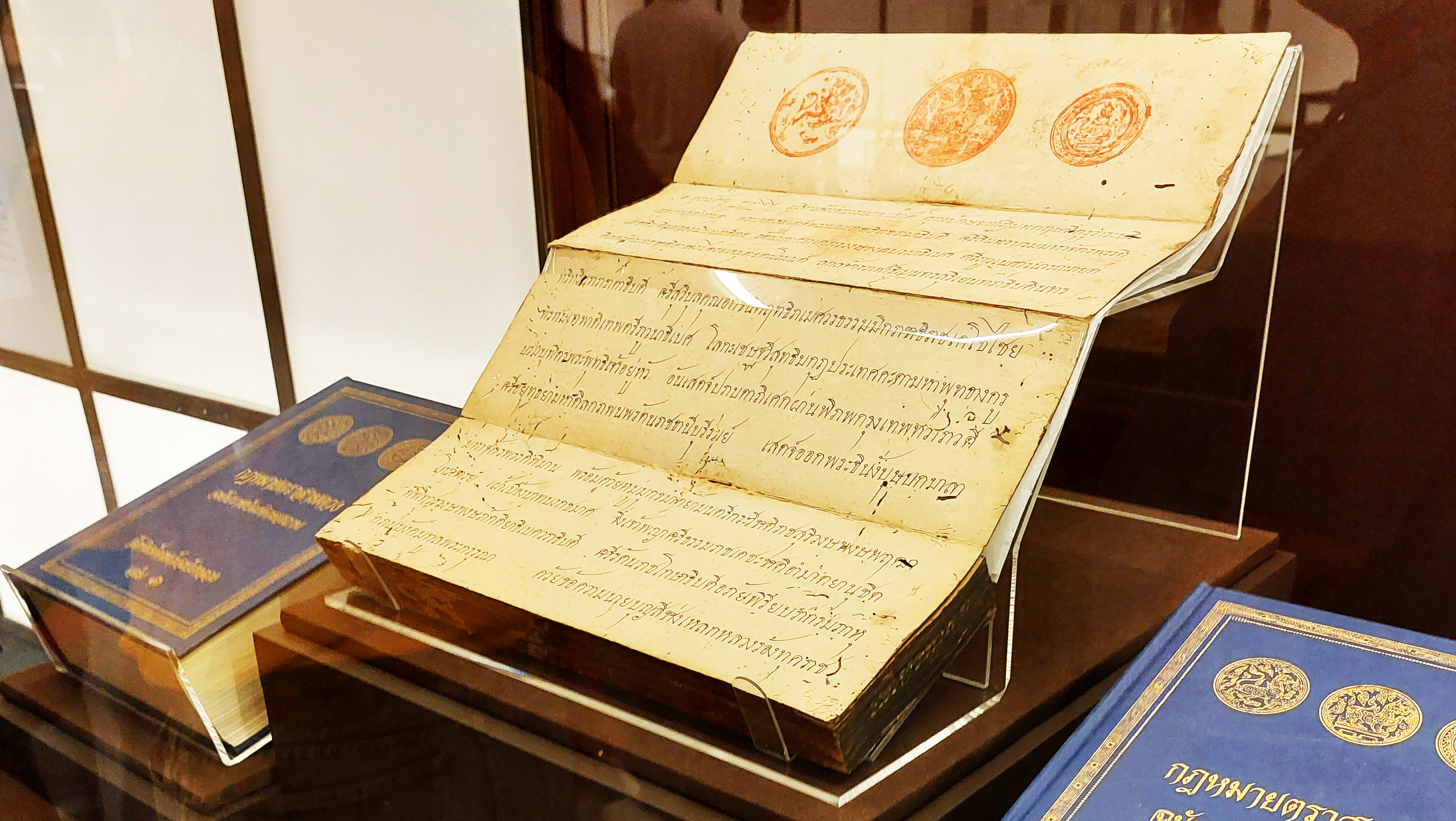
The Three Seals Law manuscript

By the Ayutthaya period, during the reign of King Borommatrailokkanat (1448–1488), the Three Seals Law recorded the organization of government departments, including a Department of Massage Physicians. This was a major department, which held higher rank (Sakdina) than officials in many other departments. Positions within the department were graded as Luang, Khun, Muen, and Phan, following the same ranking system used for officials of the period.

During the reign of King Narai (1656–1688), traditional medical knowledge was further documented through the compilation of numerous medical prescriptions. Many of these remedies had reportedly been used by royal physicians and were later compiled in the Tamra Phra Osot Phra Narai (Thai: ตำราพระโอสถพระนารายณ์; Phra Narai's Materia Medica). The collection includes preparations associated with the treatment of conditions involving the body's sen (lines) and lom (wind or vital energy), including pain, cramps, paralysis, swelling, and other disorders described in traditional Thai medicine. The prescriptions included topical medicines, oils, and ointments used as part of traditional therapeutic practices.

Evidence from the royal chronicles records that in 1758, during the reign of King Borommakot, the king fell gravely ill, and royal masseurs attended to him closely. The chronicle recounts that one day, past noon, five attendants helped him rise from bed to go to the royal privy. As Luang Ratcharaksa and Luang Racho, the royal masseurs, supported him to stand, he was struck by a sudden attack of "wind" (a traditional-medicine term for a disorder affecting circulation and nerve function): his eyes rolled back, his breathing became labored like snoring, and his hand reached out grasping for something to hold onto. The two masseurs laid him back down and administered massage to treat the affliction.

Further evidence comes from the records of Simon de la Loubère, a French envoy who visited the Kingdom of Siam in 1687–1688. He recorded that in Siam, when a person fell ill, a practitioner skilled in this art would climb onto the patient's body and press down with their feet to stretch the muscles and tendons. He also noted that pregnant women reportedly had children walk on their bodies to ease childbirth and reduce pain.

=== Rattanakosin Period (Rama I - Rama IX) ===
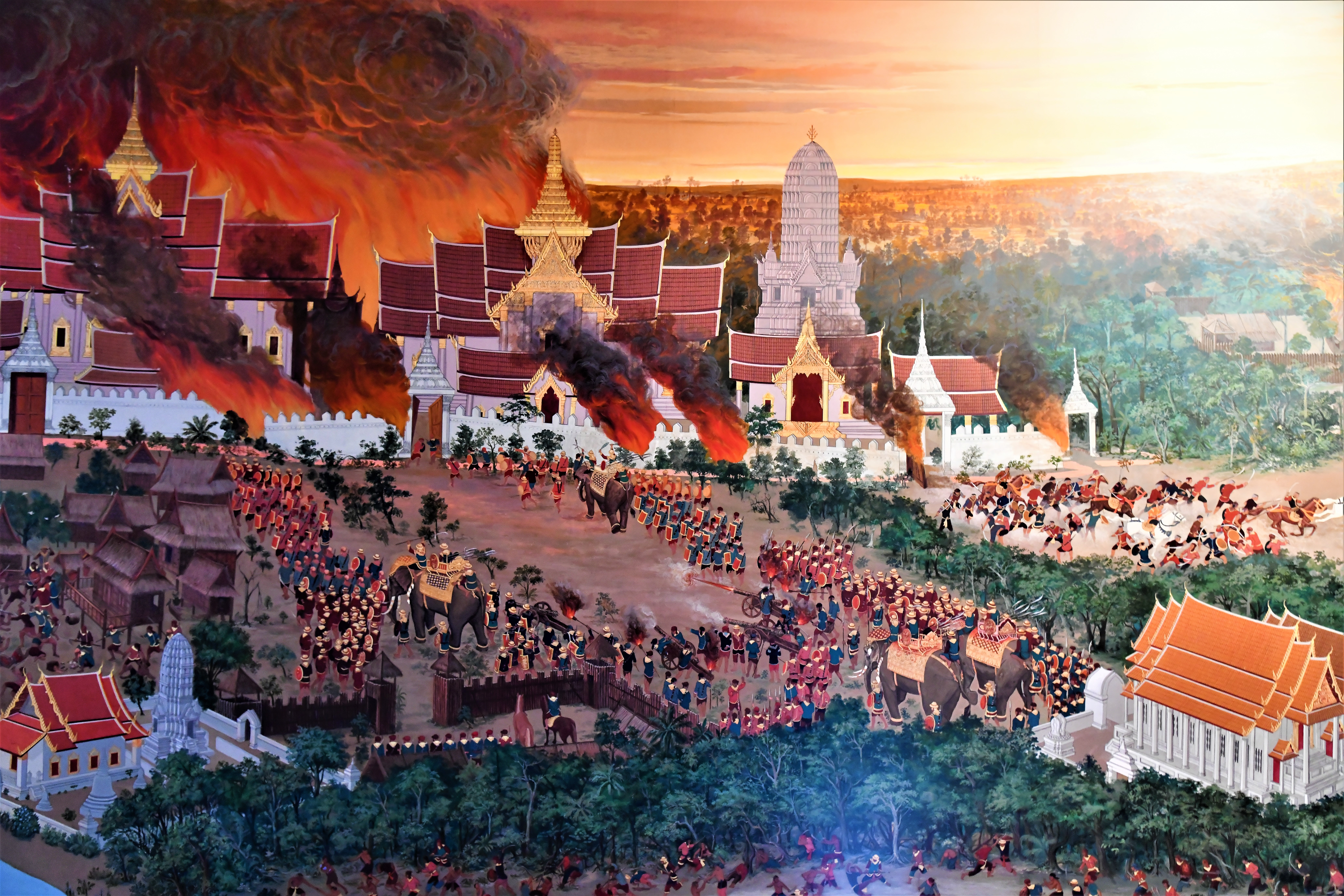
the Fall of Ayutthaya in April 1767 at the National Memorial

In the early Rattanakosin period, traditional Thai medicine continued the practices inherited from Ayutthaya, although some records and knowledge were lost due to the fall of Ayutthaya in the Burmese–Siamese War (1765–1767). Nevertheless, folk healers and monk physicians remained active in various towns.

King Rama I restored Wat Photharam and elevated it to royal temple status as Wat Phra Chetuphon Wimon Mangkhalaram Rajwaramahawihan (Wat Pho) in 1788. He ordered the compilation of medical texts and the creation of statues depicting Ruesi Dat Ton (hermit stretching exercises), each inscribed with a description of the ailment it addressed, placed in pavilions around the temple grounds. He also revived the Royal Department of Medicine.

In 1832, during the reign of King Rama III, a council of scholars and experts in various fields, including medicine, massage, poetry, archaeology, history, literature, tradition, religion, and proverbs, was convened to inscribe their knowledge on stone tablets at Wat Pho. He appointed a Royal doctor, Phraya Bamroer Rajaphat, as the chief to engrave the knowledge of Thai traditional medical science around the cloisters, Phra Maha Chedis and Sala Rai. And Prince Narongharirak, a son of Rama I, oversaw craftsmen who cast 80 statues depicting different hermit stretching postures, completed on 13 November 1836. These were placed in temple pavilions alongside 60 inscribed tablets describing the origins and treatment of diseases, along with prescriptions, composed as four-line verses by 35 poets of the era, including members of the royal family, nobles, monks, and commoners. These texts were carved onto marble panels along the temple's walls and pavilions so the public could study and apply the knowledge, at a time when medical texts were scarce. As a result, the temple became known as Thailand's first open university.

During the reign of King Mongkut (Rama IV), a Department of Massage Physicians continued to operate as it had during the Ayutthaya period, and physicians and masseurs regularly attended to the king during illness. Palace attendants and royal consorts skilled in massage would also accompany the king on his travels. The king ordered the revision of medical, massage, and hermit-exercise texts in 1870. A royal massage manual survives in the National Library of Thailand (Thai: หอพระสมุดวชิรญาณ), granted during the reign of King Chulalongkorn (Rama V) in 1906 for study and use exclusively by royal physicians. Among most important contents are diagrams of Thai massage lines, known as the Sen lines (Thai: เส้นสิบ), attributed to the physician Jīvaka over 2,500 years ago. Separately, in 1902, murals depicting 40 hermit stretching postures were painted in the pavilion of Wat Matchimawat (Wat Klang) in Songkhla province.

By the reign of King Vajiravudh (Rama VI), the Royal Department of Medicine was dissolved due to economic hardship and limited government funding. Royal physicians who had served the crown went into private practice, and massage lost its formal role at court. However, the king enacted the Medical Practice Act of 1923, which classified massage as a branch of traditional healing arts. Folk massage remained popular during this period, and one of the most renowned practitioners of the time was In Thewada (Thai: หมออินเทวดา), a court masseur.

Under King Rama VII, a 1929 ministerial regulation formally recognized massage as a branch of traditional medical practice, and in 1932 the Ancient Medicine Association of Thailand was established, offering massage instruction.

Under King Mahidol (Rama VIII), the Professional Medical Practice Control Act of 1936 was enacted but did not explicitly list massage as a recognized branch of traditional medicine.

In 1951, during the reign of King Bhumibol Adulyadej, Wat Pho committee and experts in traditional Thai medicine responded to the king's wishes by developing a curriculum for a school of traditional medicine, named the "Wat Pho Thai Traditional Medical and Massage School." It was opened in 1955 inside Wat Pho. It is the first Thai Medical School under the approval of Thai Ministry of Education. The school presently offers 4 basic courses of Thai Medicine that are Thai Pharmacy, Thai medical practice, Thai Midwife Nurse and Thai Massage.

== Training ==
The Thai Ministry of Public Health's Department for Development of Thai Traditional and Alternative Medicine regulates Thai traditional massage venues and practitioners. As of 2016 the department says 913 traditional clinics have been registered nationwide in Thailand. As of 2018, of the 8,000 to 10,000 spa and massage shops in Thailand, only 4,228 are certified by the Health Ministry's Department of Health Service Support (HSS).

A licensed, traditional massage practitioner is required to complete at least 800 hours training. Massage therapists must acquire a professional license and must register at the Public Health Ministry's Department of Health Service Support (HSS). To qualify for a license, therapists must be trained in courses created by the HSS. The standard courses are provided free. Alternatively, students can go to one of the 181 schools nationwide approved to train therapists using standard HSS courses.

Wat Pho, the center of Thai medicine and massage for centuries, opened the Wat Pho Thai Traditional Medical and Massage School in 1955 on the temple grounds, the first such school approved by the Thai Ministry of Education. Wat Pho offers four basic courses of Thai medicine: Thai massage, Thai midwife-nurse, Thai pharmacy, and Thai medical practice. Thai massage is also taught and practiced in other countries. In 2005, Thai Healing Alliance International (THAI) began to acknowledge Registered Thai Therapists (RTT) and Instructors around the world who met basic standards of study and practice. Today, THAI serves the general public as the largest online library of information and research about traditional Thai massage and Thai healing arts.

== Thai acupressure ==
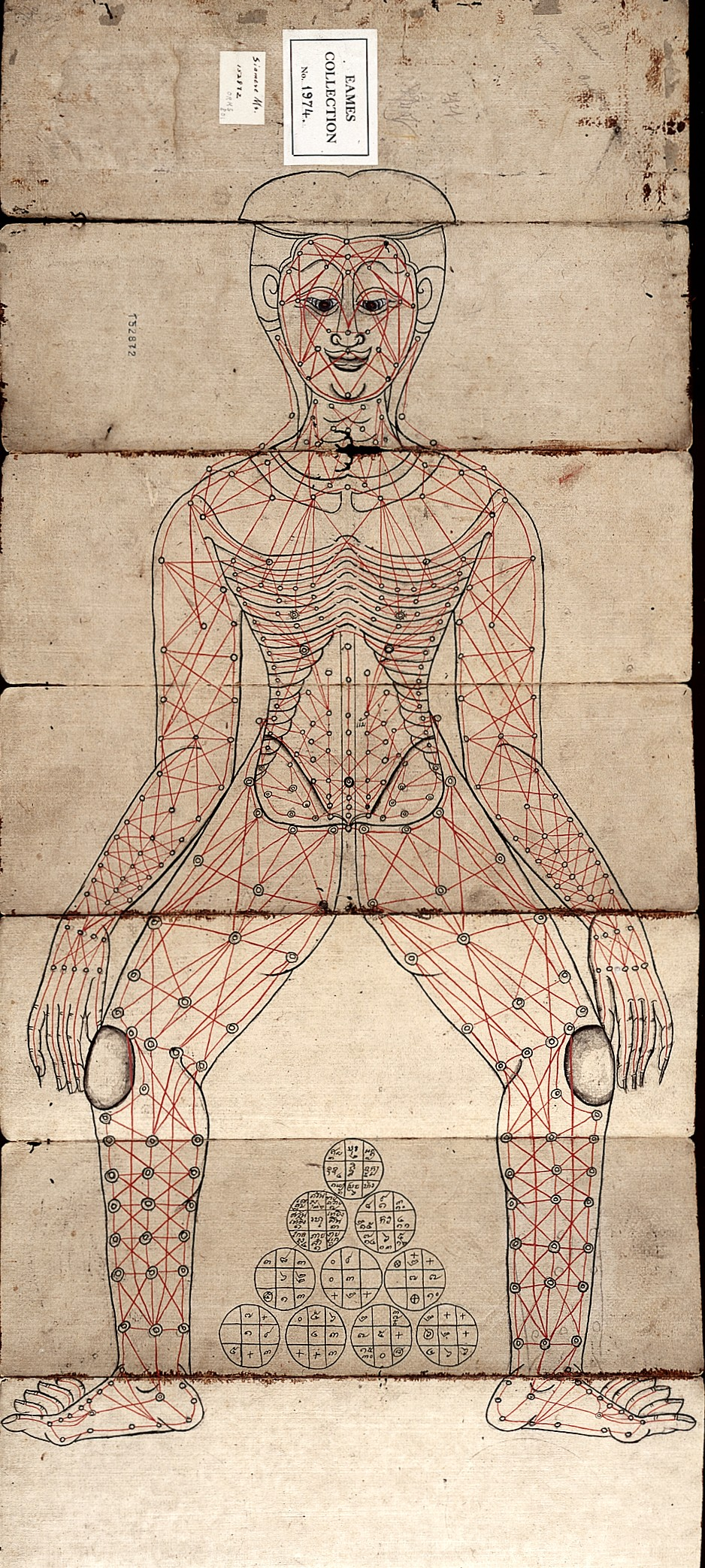
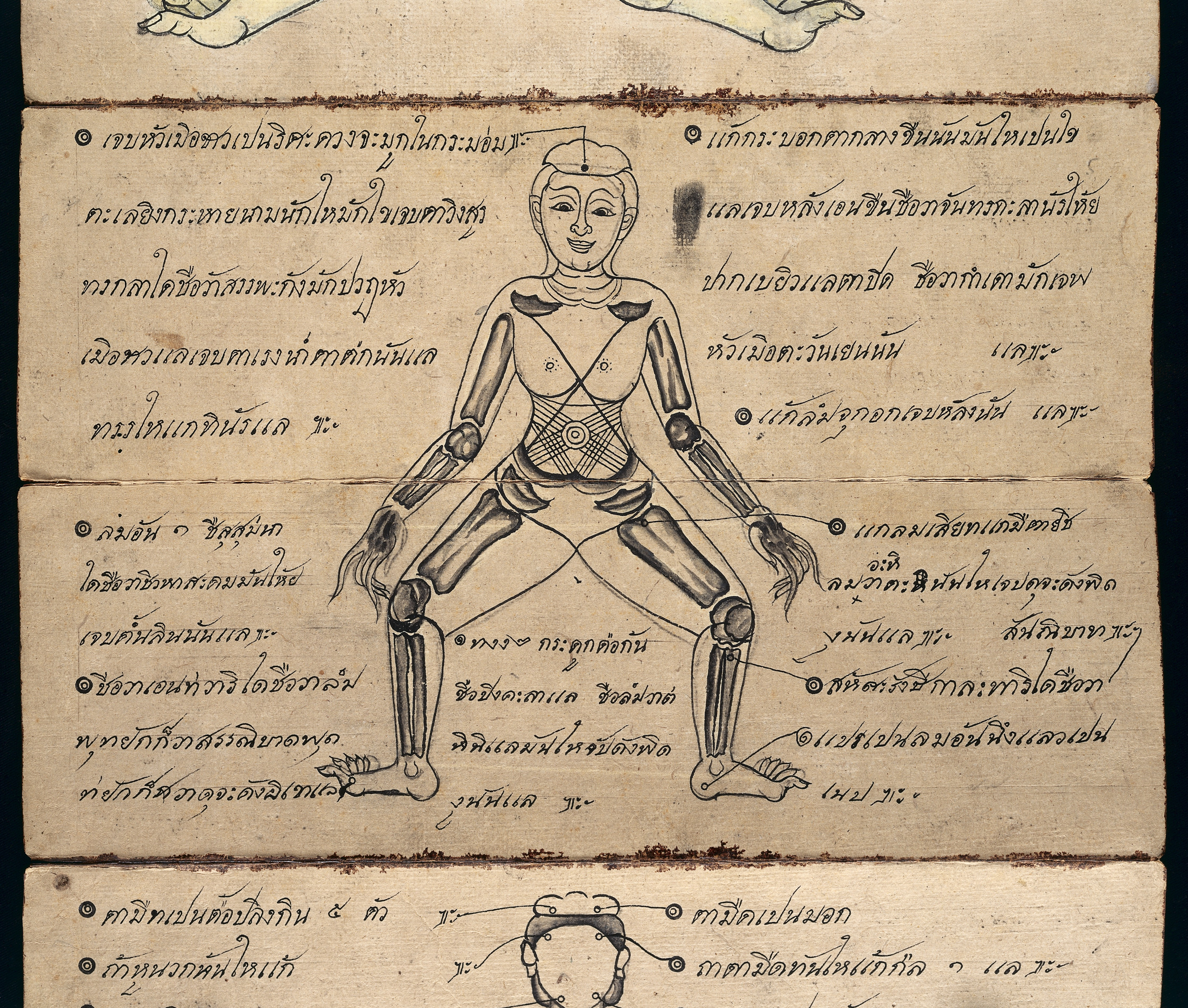
Ancient manuscripts of Thai acupressure

Thai acupressure (Thai: kot chut thai; กดจุดไทย) is a therapeutic technique derived from traditional royal Thai massage. It involves the application of finger pressure to specific points on the body to restore the flow of chi phajon (Thai: ชีพจร), a concept in traditional Thai medicine referring to the circulation of "blood and wind" rather than the anatomical pulse or circulatory system recognized in modern medicine. The technique has been transmitted through successive generations of practitioners and is primarily performed using the fingers.

According to traditional Thai medical theory, Thai acupressure aims to restore the balance and function of the body's elemental and energetic systems by stimulating specific points associated with the body's vital pathways. It is traditionally used to relieve musculoskeletal pain and stiffness and is also applied in the management of conditions including headaches, migraines, insomnia, hypertension, allergies, frozen shoulder, knee osteoarthritis, menstrual pain, and paralysis.

Thai acupressure is based on traditional Thai medical concepts of the four elements (Thai: ธาตุทั้งสี่), which are earth, water, wind, and fire. And the Tridosha (Thai: ตรีธาตุ), consisting of Vata (Thai: วาตะ), Pitta (Thai: ปิตตะ), and Semha (Thai: เสมหะ), and the diagnosis of disorders affecting the body's vital pathways. Some practitioners also interpret the technique in relation to the peripheral and central nervous systems, suggesting that stimulation of specific pressure points may influence muscular, neurological, and circulatory function.

== Thai Herbal Compress Massage ==
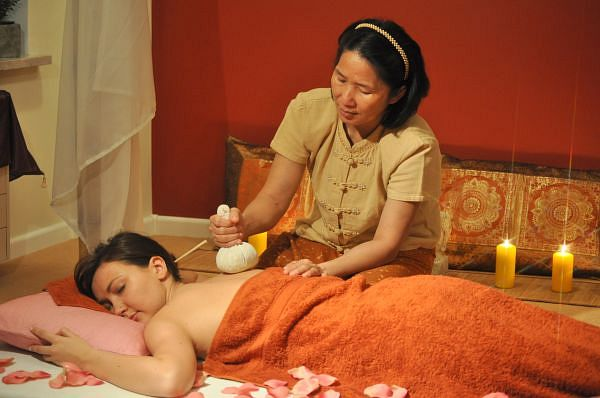
Thai massage using herbal compress for treatment

Thai herbal compress massage (Thai: luk pra khop; ลูกประคบ) is a therapeutic practice commonly used in conjunction with traditional Thai massage. It involves the application of steamed cloth compresses containing fresh or dried medicinal herbs to various parts of the body, typically following a massage session. The treatment combines the therapeutic effects of heat and herbal constituents to enhance the benefits of massage.

Herbal compress therapy is traditionally used to stimulate blood circulation, relieve muscle pain and stiffness, reduce swelling and inflammation, improve the flexibility of muscles and connective tissues, and promote relaxation. In traditional postpartum care, herbal compresses are also used to help relieve breast engorgement.

The herbal compress is traditionally prepared by wrapping a mixture of medicinal herbs in a cotton cloth to form a compress ball. Common ingredients include zingiber montanum, turmeric, curcuma zedoaria, lemongrass, kaffir lime, tamarind leaves, soap pod leaves, camphor, and borneol. Before application, the compress is steamed until hot and then gently pressed onto the body along the muscles and areas previously treated by massage. The heat is applied gradually to avoid burns, and the compress is reheated or alternated with another heated compress during treatment. A typical treatment session lasts approximately 15–20 minutes, although it may be performed twice daily for certain musculoskeletal conditions such as sprains.

== Effectiveness ==
All types of massage, including Thai massage, can help people relax, temporarily relieve muscle or joint pain, and temporarily boost a person's mood. Moreover, research suggests that Thai massage may also help reduce psychological stress, decrease sympathetic nervous system activity, and promote relaxation.

However, some practitioners' claims go far beyond those effects well demonstrated by clinical study. Some clinicians dispute its efficacy.

== See also ==
- Massage
- Yoga
- Traditional Thai medicine
- Thai Massage (film)
- List of forms of alternative medicine
- List of Intangible Cultural Heritage elements in Thailand
