= Jivakarama vihara =

Buddhist monastery in Bihar, India

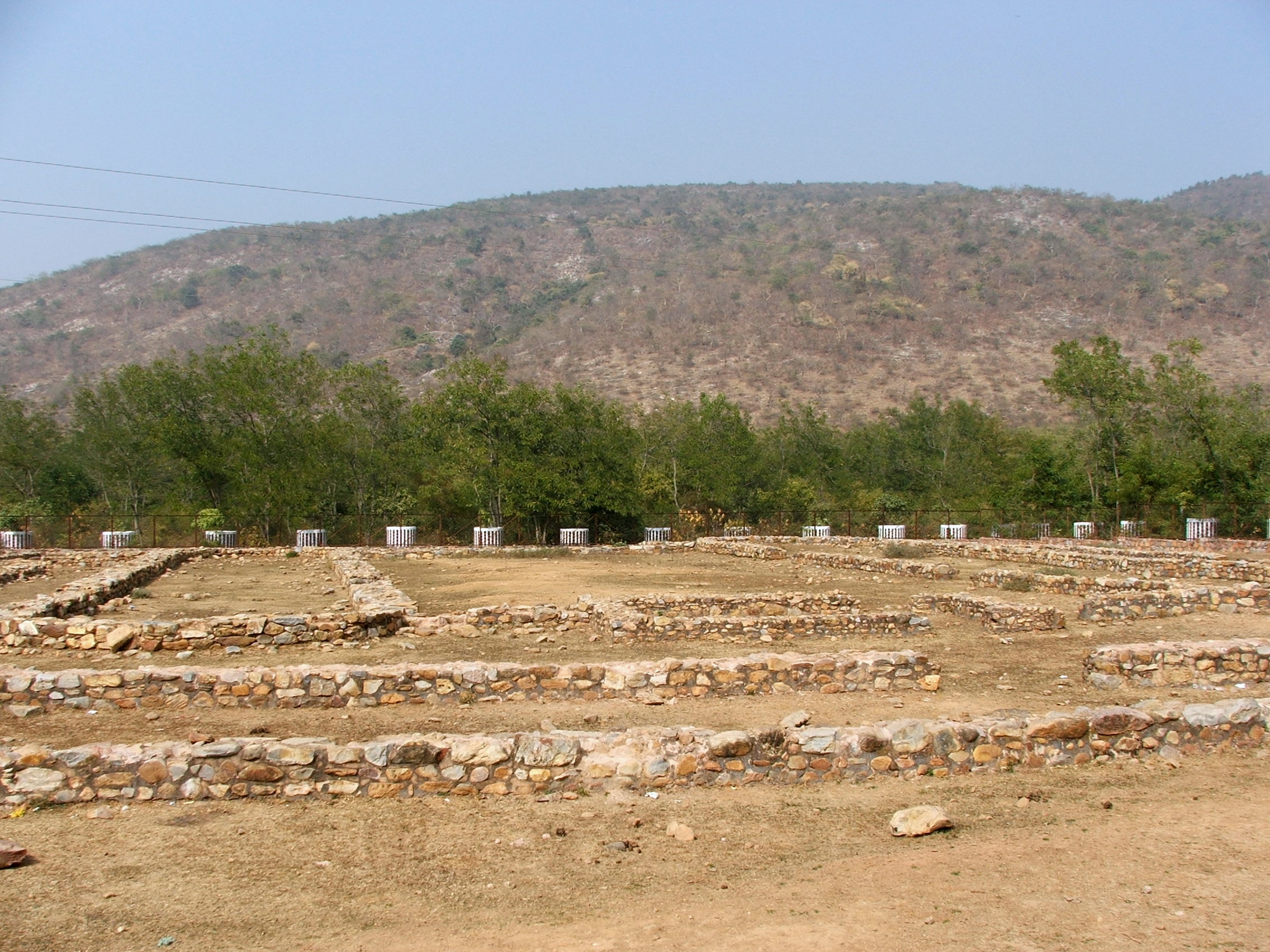
- Remains of the Jivakarama vihara.

- Location within India

Religion
- Affiliation: Buddhism
- Region: Bihar
- Ecclesiastical or organizational status: Vihara ruins
- Year consecrated: 6th-5th century BCE
- Status: Artifacts removed

Location
- Location: Rajgir, Bihar, India
- Interactive map of Jivakarama vihara
- Coordinates: 24.9953334°N 85.433397°E

The Jivakarama vihara, also Jivaka Amravana vihara (Amra-vana means "mango garden"), Jivakamravana, Jivakamrabana or Jivakavanarama, is an ancient Buddhist monastery, or vihara, established at the time of the Buddha.

The location, on the outside of Rajagriha in Nalanda district in the Indian state of Bihar, just below the Gijjhakuta hill, was originally a mango orchard which was donated to the sangha by the famous royal doctor Jivaka, who was in the service of king Bimbisara. Jivaka built a monastery on the location and also donated it to the sangha. The Buddha is said to have been treated once in the monastery, after having been injured by Devadatta.

The initial monastery was formed of two long parallel and oblong halls, large dormitories where the monks could eat and sleep, in conformity with the original regulations of the sangha, without any private cells. Other halls were then constructed, mostly long, oblong building as well, which remind of the oblong construction of several of the Barabar caves.

The archaeological evidence point to a very early construction for this vihara, probably circa 530-400 BCE. This vihara is very different from the later quadrangular vihara built from the 1st century CE in Gandhara. The absence of stupa is also noticeable, contrary to the viharas built with stupas at a later date. The construction method (rubble foundation) and artifacts discovered on the spot, such as iron nails, terracotta balls or coarse red pottery all point to a date no later than the 5th century BCE.

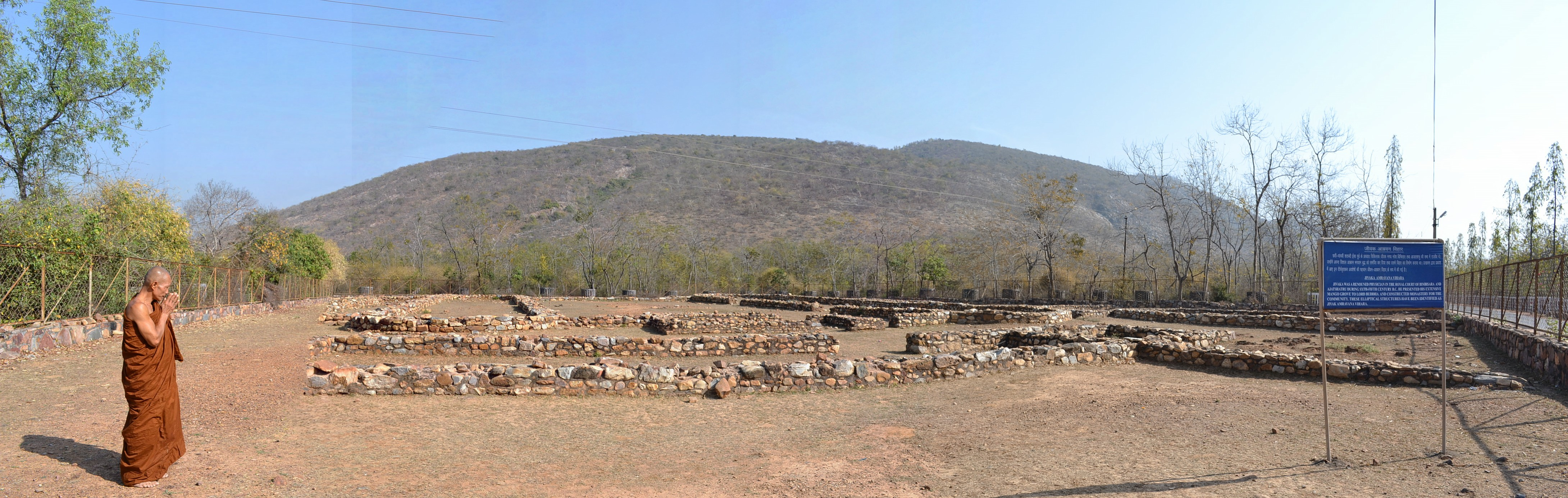
A Buddhist monk at the monastery.

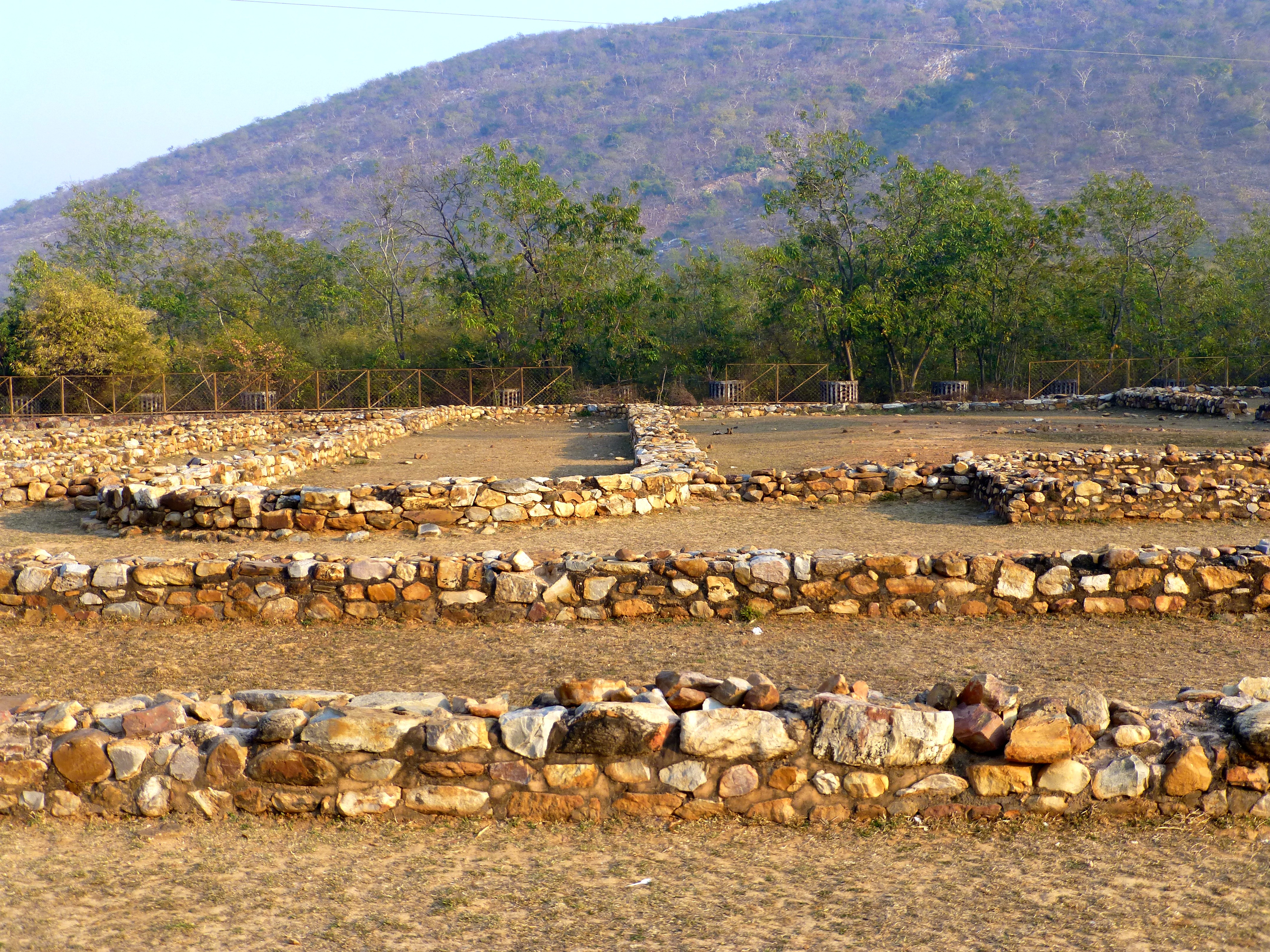
Ruins.

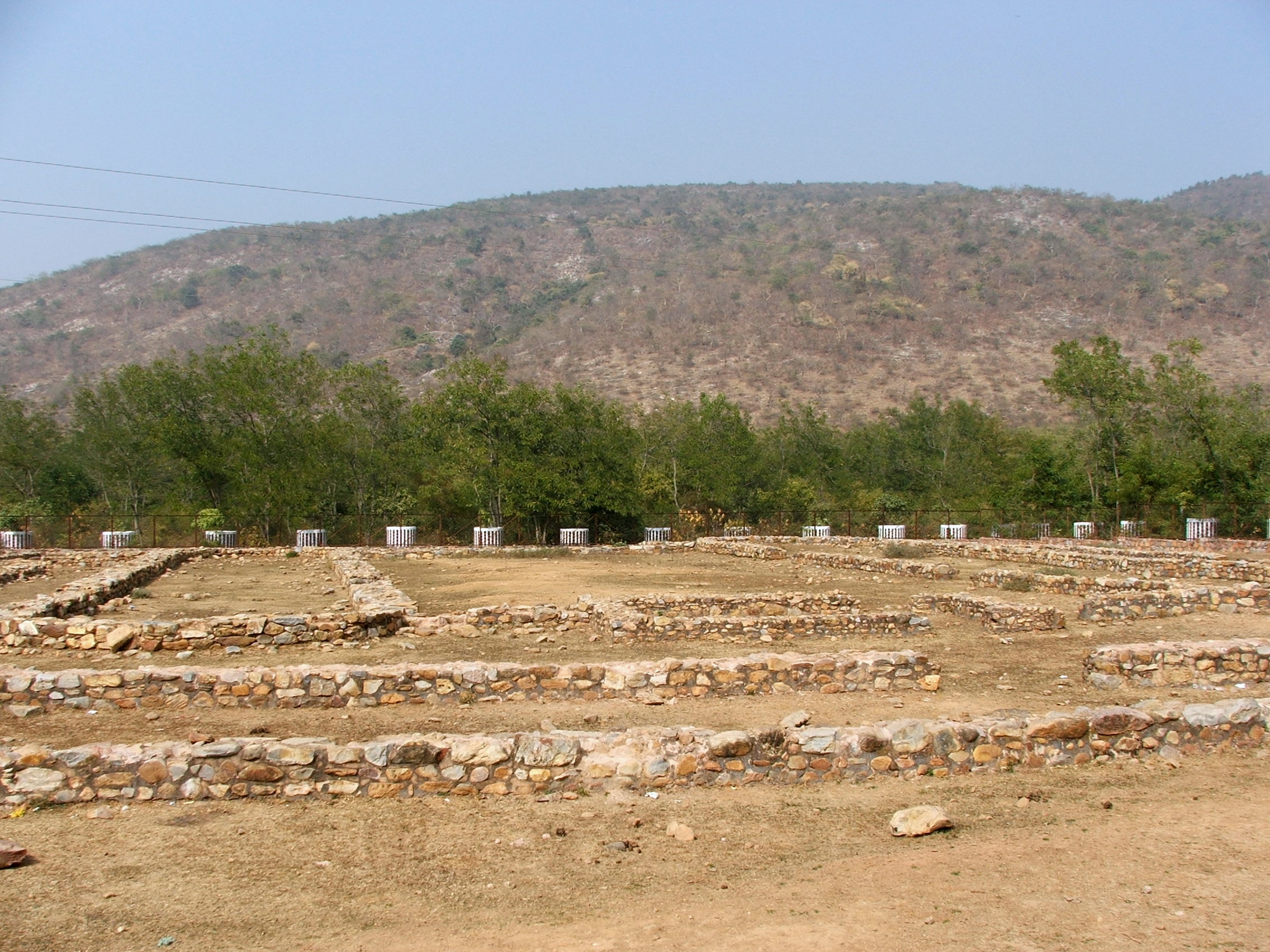
Ruins.

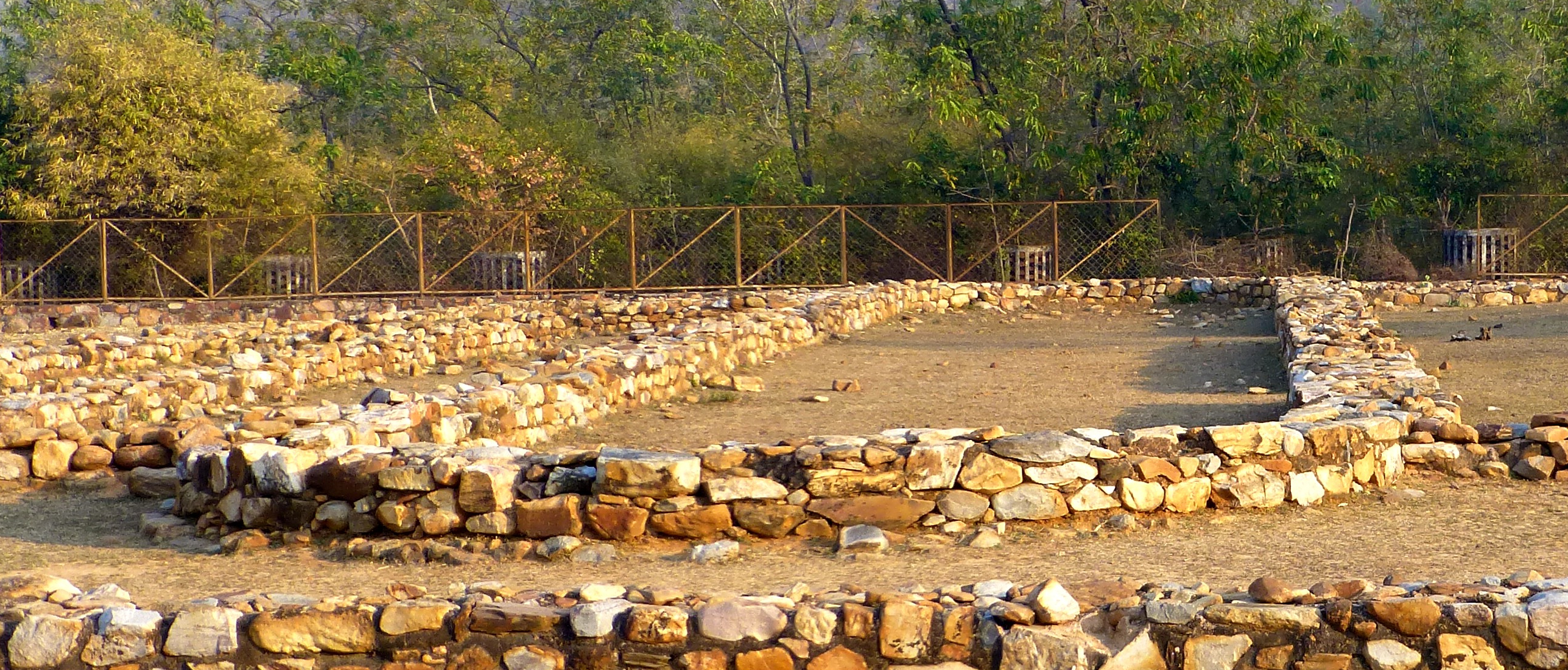
Oblong communal hall (remains).

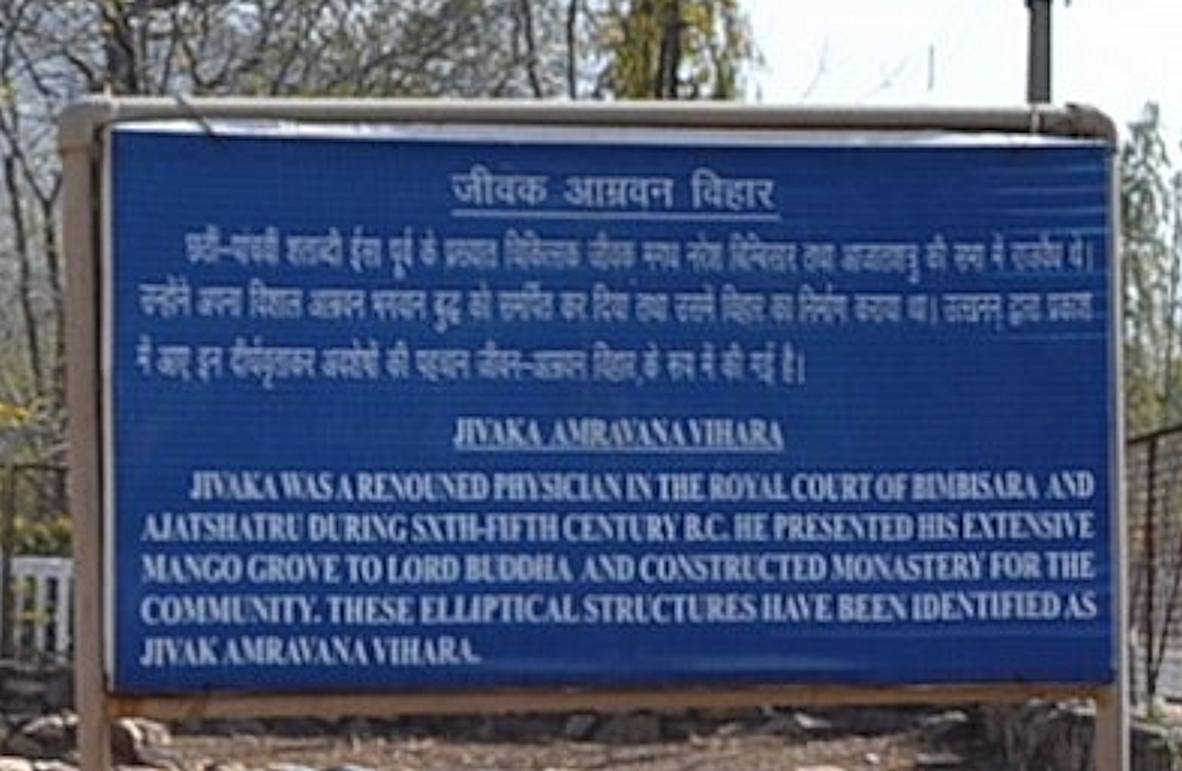
Archaeological Survey of India notice.
