= Tibba Mehrban Shah =

Coordinates: 32°12′20″N 71°18′20″E

Tibba Mehrban Shah ٹِبّہ مہربان شاه
- Village and union council
- Interactive map of Tibba Mehrban Shah ٹِبّہ مہربان شاه
- Country: Pakistan
- Region: Punjab
- District: Mianwali District
- Time zone: UTC+5 (PST)

Tibba Mehrban Shah (Urdu: ٹِبّہ مہربان شاه), is a village and union council of Mianwali District in the Punjab province of Pakistan. It is located in Piplan Tehsil at 32°12'20N 71°18'20E.
