= Doaba, Mianwali =

Coordinates: 32°20′1″N 71°23′44″E

Doaba, Mianwali دوآبہ
- Town and union council
- Interactive map of Doaba, Mianwali
- Country: Pakistan
- Region: Punjab
- District: Mianwali District
- Tehsil: Piplan Tehsil
- Time zone: UTC+5 (PST)
- Area code: 0459

Doaba (Urdu: دوآبہ), is a town and union council of Mianwali District in the Punjab province of Pakistan. It is located in Piplan Tehsil at 32°20'1N 71°23'44E.

In the west is River Indus and in the east is Main Thal Canal.
