= Alluwali =

Coordinates: 32°21′57″N 71°24′5″E

- Village
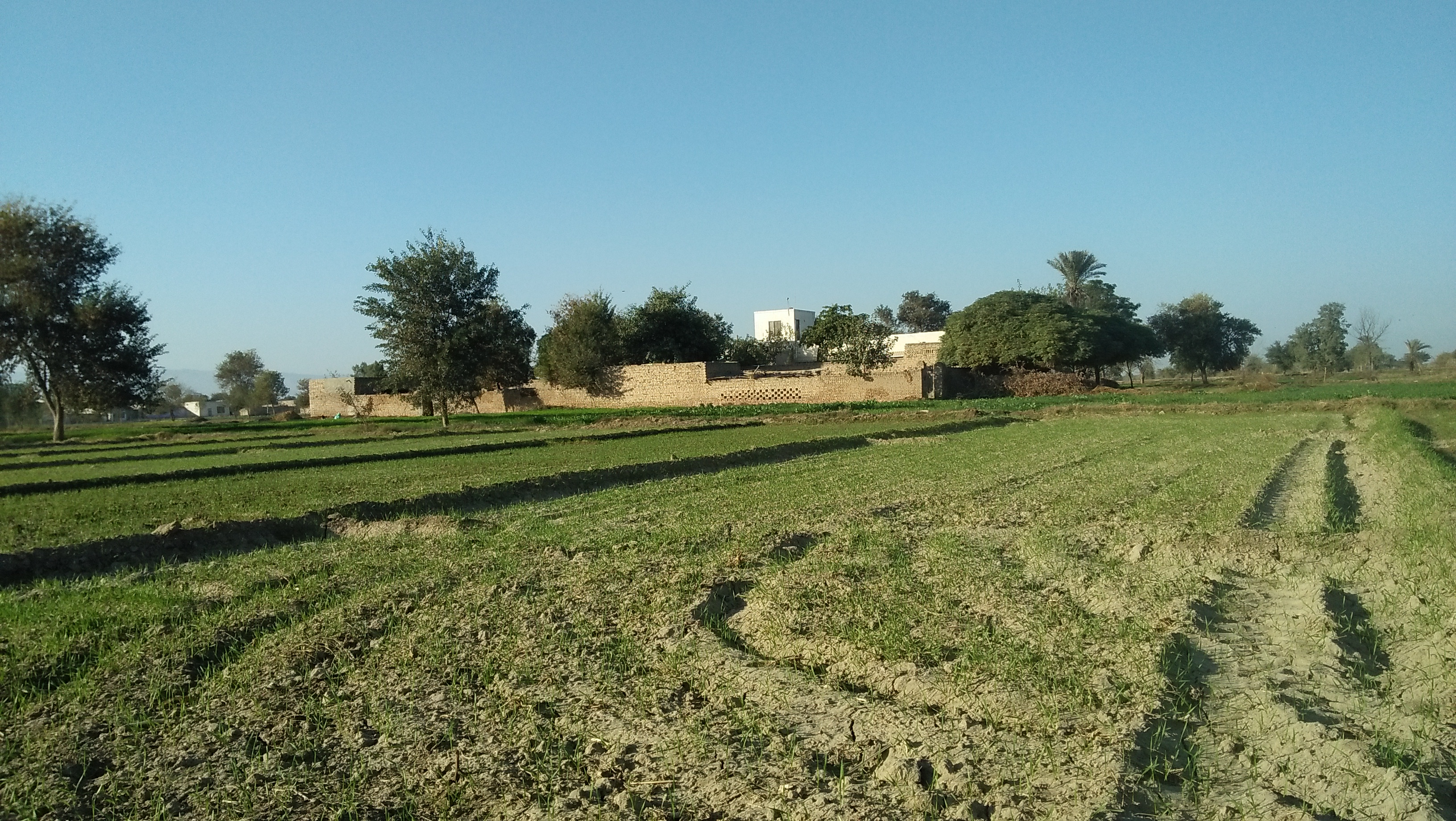
- Country: Pakistan
- Region: Punjab
- District: Mianwali
- Tehsil: Piplan
- Time zone: UTC+5 (PST)

Alluwali (Urdu: علووالى) is a village and union council of Mianwali District in the Punjab province of Pakistan. It is almost 39 km (by road) from the district capital Mianwali which lies to the north. It is located in Piplan Tehsil at 32°21'57N 71°24'5E on the bank of the Indus River. Alluwali has a population up to 40000. It is situated almost 7 km from Chashma Nuclear Power Complex, of the Pakistan Atomic Energy Commission.
