= Traditional Thai medicine =

Traditional system of methods and practices in Thailand

Traditional Thai medicine is a system of methods and practices, such as herbal medicine, bodywork practices, and spiritual healing that is indigenous to the region currently known as Thailand. While not all Buddhist medicine is Thai, Thai medicine is considered Buddhist medicine.

== History ==
Traditional Thai medicine stems from pre-history indigenous regional practices with a strong animistic foundation, the rich diversity of medicinal plants found across the different regions of present-day Thailand, indigenous Thai animistic knowledge blended with the influences from Indian Ayurveda, Chinese medicine, and Buddhist philosophy, together with the cumulative exchange of medical knowledge through centuries of cultural interaction across mainland Southeast Asia.

In the early-1900s, traditional medicine was "outlawed as quackery" in favor of Western medicine, however by the mid-1990s traditional medicine was once again being supported by the Thai government. The Seventh National Economic and Social Plan for 1992–1996 stated that "[t]he promotion of people's health entails the efforts to develop traditional wisdom in health care, including Thai traditional medicine, herbal medicine, and traditional massage, so as to integrate it into the modern health service system." In 1993 the government of Thailand created the National Institute of Thai Traditional Medicine, under the supervision of the Ministry of Public Health. The goal of the institute is to "systematize and standardize the body of traditional Thai medicine knowledge", to "gather knowledge, revise, verify, classify, and explain traditional Thai medicine knowledge", and to "compare and explain the philosophies and basic theories of traditional Thai medicine and to produce textbooks on traditional Thai medicine".

== Divisions ==
Regional differences between healing arts practitioners across Thailand and the recent codification of traditional Thai medicine by the Thai Ministry of Public Health have led to the existence of several variations of Thai medicine. These can be understood as follows:

- Traditional Thai medicine - while this umbrella title is used to describe all traditional medicine practices in Thailand, it can also be used to describe the system of medicine as systematized and taught by the Ministry of Public Health.
- Traditional medicine of Thailand - Traditional Thai medicine is based on this system, which is based on ancient texts, and varies a bit between practitioners throughout the kingdom.
- Local/Indigenous/village medicine - local practices based largely on oral tradition and local texts handed down from teacher to student.
  - Lanna medicine - A regional form of local/indigenous/village medicine requiring its own category due to the unique nature of being possibly the most preserved form of the roots of Thai medicine.

== Branches ==
Traditional Thai medicine (used as umbrella term for all medicine of Thailand) consists of five primary branches:

- Internal medicine - Primarily the use of herbs and diet to promote health
- External medicine - All therapies applied to the external body including but not limited to:
  - Bone setting (indigenous chiropractic)
  - Thai cupping
  - Thai scraping (a practice similar to Chinese Gua Sha)
  - Thai massage techniques including compression, Thai acupressure, beating, passive stretching and focus on sen channels (pathways of movement in the body such as tendons, ligaments, nerves and circulatory vessels)
  - External application of herbs through unique herbology of balms, liniments, compresses and poultices
- Spirit medicine - Use of amulets, incantations, sak yan tattooing and shamanistic involvement with spirits for the purpose of healing
- Divination - Use of vedic astrology, numerology, palmistry and geomancy to determine health predisposition and remedial measures
- Buddhism - seen as the mental health branch of Thai medicine.

== Licensing ==
Licensing and promotion is gaining ground in Thailand due to concerns about quality and safety. In fiscal year 2013, almost one million people used traditional therapy under the universal health scheme, which partially subsidized the treatments. About 6,000 hospitals are equipped with clinics having licensed traditional medical practitioners. One of the leading hospitals in Traditional Thai medicine is Chaophraya Abhaibhubejhr Hospital in Prachinburi Province.

== See also ==
- Pharmacognosy
- Hong Thai (inhaler)
- Traditional Thai massage
