= Piplan Tehsil =

Administrative sub-division in Mianwali District, Punjab, Pakistan

تحصِيل پِپلاں
- Tehsil
- Piplan Tehsil
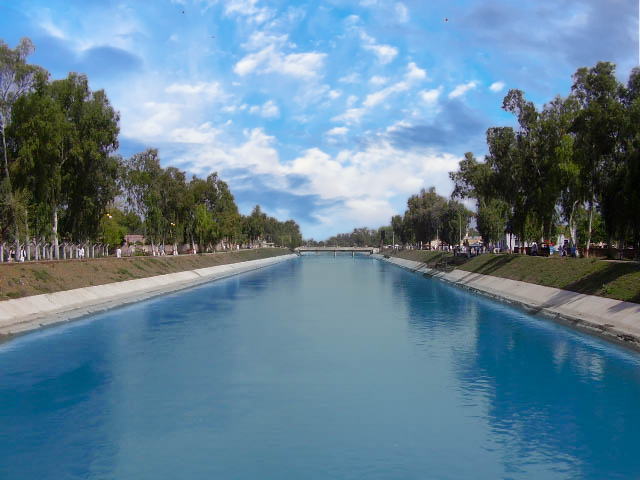
- Thal Canal
- Country: Pakistan
- Region: Punjab
- District: Mianwali District
- Capital: Piplan
- Towns: 2
- Union councils: 12

Area
  - Tehsil: 1,288 km^{2} (497 sq mi)

Population (2023 Pakistani Census)
  - Tehsil: 475,763
  - Density: 369.4/km^{2} (956.7/sq mi)
  - Urban: 106,271 (22.34%)
  - Urban density: 369,492/km^{2} (956,980/sq mi)
  - Rural: 369,492 (77.66%)

Literacy
  - Literacy rate: Total: (63.46%); Male: (76.04%); Female: (50.05%)
- Time zone: UTC+5 (PST)

Piplan Tehsil (Urdu: تحصِيل پِپلاں) is an administrative subdivision (tehsil) of Mianwali District in the Punjab province of Pakistan. The tehsil is subdivided into 2 Municipal committees and 12 Union Councils - one of which forms the capital Liaqatabad.

According to 2017 Pakistani census, the total population of Piplan Tehsil is 403,938, out of which 307,729 people live in rural and 96,209 in urban areas.

== Administration ==
Piplan tehsil is administratively subdivided into 2 Municipal Committees (MC Piplan and MC Kundian) and 12 Union Councils:

- Alluwali
- Dabb Balouchan
- Doaba, Mianwali
- Kacha Gujrat
- Noshera Mor
- Hazara Shumali
- MamuWali
- Chak No 7 ML Hafiz Wala
- Hernoli (Urban)
- Harnoli (Rural)
- Khola Khanqah Sirajia
- Kundian Rural
- Chak No 4 DB
- Tibba Mehrban Shah
- Vichvin Bala
- Kundian

== Urban areas and Towns ==
Name	Area (km²)	Pop. (2023)	Density (ppl/km²) (2023)	Literacy rate (2023)
Kundian		48,658		
Liaqatabad		35,297		
Harnoli		22,316		

== Demographics ==
=== Population ===
Historical population
Year	Pop.	±% p.a.
1951	...	—
1961	...	—
1972	...	—
1981	...	—
1998	...	—
2017	402,050	—
2023	475,763	+2.85%
Sources: As of the 2023 census, Piplan tehsil has an average household size of 6.2 and a population of 475,763.
