= NA-89 Mianwali-I =

Constituency of the National Assembly of Pakistan

- Constituency for the National Assembly of Pakistan
- Region: Isakhel Tehsil, Daud Khel and Kalabagh towns and Mianwali city (partly) of Mianwali Tehsil in Mianwali District
- Electorate: 565,437

Current constituency
- Party: Pakistan Muslim League (N)
- Member: Haji Obaidullah Khan Shadikhel
- Created from: NA-71 Mianwali-I

NA-89 Mianwali-I (این اے-89، میانوالی-۱) is a constituency for the National Assembly of Pakistan.

== Area ==
- Isa Khel
- Daud Khel
- Kalabagh
- Some areas of Mianwali Tehsil

== Members of Parliament ==
=== 1970–1977: NW-44 Mianwali-I ===
Election	Member	Party
1970	Nawabzada Malik Muzaffar Khan	Independent

=== 1977: NA-60 Mianwali-I ===
Election	Member	Party
1977	Nawabzada Malik Muzaffar Khan	PPP

=== 1985: NA-60 Mianwali ===
Election	Member	Party
1985	Maqbool Ahmed Khan Niazi	Independent

=== 1988–2002: NA-53 Mianwali-I ===
Election	Member	Party
1988	Abdul Sattar Khan Niazi	PAI
1990	Abdul Sattar Khan Niazi	JUP
1993	Obaidullah Khan Shadikhel	Independent
1997	Maqbool Ahmed Khan Niazi	PML-N

=== 2002–2018: NA-71 Mianwali-I ===
Election	Member	Party
2002	Imran Khan	PTI
2008	Nawabzada Malik Amad Khan	Independent
2013	Imran Khan	PTI
2013 by-election	Obaidullah Khan Shadikhel	PML-N

=== 2018–2022: NA-95 Mianwali-I ===
Election	Member	Party
2018	Imran Khan	PTI

=== 2024–present: NA-89 Mianwali-I ===
Election	Member	Party
2024	Jamal Ahsan Khan	PTI

== List of MNAs ==
N	Portrait	MNAs	Entered Office	Left Office
1		Malik Muzaffar Khan	7 December 1970	6 March 1977
2		Malik Muzaffar Khan	7 March 1977	5 July 1977
3		Maqbool Ahmed Khan Niazi	25 February 1985	29 May 1988
4		Abdul Sattar Khan Niazi	2 December 1988	6 August 1990
5		Abdul Sattar Khan Niazi	6 November 1990	18 July 1993
6		Obaidullah Khan Shadikhel	18 October 1993	5 November 1996
7		Maqbool Ahmed Khan Niazi	17 February 1997	12 October 1999
8		Imran Khan	10 October 2002	3 November 2007
9		Nawabzada Malik Amad Khan	17 March 2008	16 March 2013
10		Imran Khan	11 May 2013	1 June 2013
11		Obaidullah Khan ShadiKhel	30 August 2013	31 May 2018
12		Imran Khan	13 August 2018	21 October 2022
13		Obaidullah Khan Shadikhel	29 February 2024	Incumbent

== Election 2002 ==
General elections were held on 10 October 2002.

General election 2002: NA-71 Mianwali-I
Party	Candidate	Votes	%
PTI	Imran Khan	66,737	48.34
PML(Q)	Haji Obaidullah Shadikhel	60,533	43.85
Others	Others (five candidates)	10,780	7.81
Turnout		144,068	46.89
Valid ballots		138,050	95.82
Rejected ballots		6,018	4.18
Majority		6,204	4.49
Registered electors		307,223	
PTI win (new seat)			

== Election 2008 ==
Nawabzada Malik Amad Khan succeeded in the election 2008 and became the member of National Assembly.

General Election 2008: NA-71 Mianwali-I
Party	Candidate	Votes	%	±%
Independent	Nawabzada Malik Amad Khan	88,566	49.50	Steady
Independent	Amanatullah Khan Shadikhel	73,019	43.50	Steady
PPP	Sardar Bahadur Babar Khan	4,260	2.50	▲1.3
PML(N)	Inamullah Khan Niazi	2,087	1.20	▲1.2
Turnout		167,932	50.86	▲3.97
Rejected ballots		5,468	1.98	▼0.95
Majority		10,079	6.0	▲1.51
Registered electors		330,173		
Independent gain from PTI				

Note: PTI boycotted these elections.

== Election 2013 ==
General elections were held on 11 May 2013.

General election 2013: NA-71 Mianwali-I
Party	Candidate	Votes	%	±%
PTI	Imran Khan	133,224	59.40	▲59.40
PML(N)	Haji Obaidullah Shadikhel	73,373	32.70	▲31.50
Others	Others (ten candidates)	9,797	7.90	
Turnout		222,919	57.61	▲6.75
Rejected ballots		7,988	2.93	▲0.95
Majority		59,815	26.70	▲20.70
Registered electors		307,223		
PTI gain from PML(N)				

== By-election 2013 ==
Imran Khan, who won this seat in the 2013 general election, also emerged victorious on two other seats. As per Pakistani law, he was only allowed to keep a single seat. Therefore, he vacated this seat, as well as NA-1 (Peshawar-I), and chose to retain NA-56 (Rawalpindi-VII). As a result, a by-election was held on 22 August 2013, which Obaidullah Shadikhel won, and became a member of the National Assembly.

By-election 2013; NA-71 Mianwali-I
Party	Candidate	Votes	%	±%
PML(N)	Haji Obaidullah Shadikhel	95,210	54.0	▲22.7
PTI	Malik Waheed Khan	76,684	43.0	▼16.4
Others	Others (six candidates)	2,346	3.0	▼4.90
Turnout		177,764	46.0	▼11.61
Rejected ballots		3,524	1.98	▼0.95
Majority		18,526	11.0	▼15.7
Registered electors		386,794		
PML(N) gain from PTI				

== Election 2018 ==
General elections were held on 25 July 2018.

General election 2018: NA-95 Mianwali-I
Party	Candidate	Votes	%	±%
PTI	Imran Khan	163,538	64.67	▲21.67
PML(N)	Obaidullah Shadikhel	50,015	19.78	▼35.78
Others	Others (nine candidates)	31,142	12.32	▲9.32
Turnout		252,872	54.29	▲8.29
Rejected ballots		8,177	3.23	▲1.25
Majority		113,523	44.89	▲33.89
Registered electors		465,740		
PTI gain from PML(N)				

== Election 2024 ==
General elections were held on 8 February 2024. Jamal Ahsan Khan Isakhel won the election with 217,613 votes.

General election 2024: NA-89 Mianwali-I
Party	Candidate	Votes	%	±%
PTI	Jamal Ahsan Khan (Note: Filed nomination papers as PTI candidate but ECP allowed him to run as an Independent)	217,427	57.87	▲39.73
PML(N)	Obaidullah Shadikhel	34,068	39.23	▼24.11
Independent	Khurram Hameed Khan	12,454	4.14	
PPP	Nawab Malik Aamir Muhammad Khan	11,881	3.95	▲3.31
Others	Others (13 candidates)	24,618	8.17	
Turnout		526,931	93.19	
Total valid votes		526,139	99.99	
Rejected ballots		700	0.01	
Majority		83,200	18.64	▲15.89
Registered electors		565,437		

== See also ==
- NA-88 Khushab-II
- NA-90 Mianwali-II
