= Bani Afghan =

Pakistani village

Bani Afghan بنى افغان
- Village
- Interactive map of Bani Afghan
- Country: Pakistan
- Province: Mianwali Punjab, Pakistan
- Established: 32°57′05″N 71°42′27″E
- Elevation: 319 m (1,047 ft)
- Time zone: UTC+5
  - Summer (DST): UTC+6 (PDT)

Bani Afghan (بنى افغان – children of Afghan) is a village in the Mianwali District of Punjab Province, within Kala Bagh (قلعه باغ – Garden of the Citadel) in Pakistan. The village has an elementary school and is primarily inhabited by Pashtun tribes from various areas, including Kutch Tander Khel, Borh Khoi, Asghari, Kayaki, Kani, and Jamrah. The village is about 4 kilometres from the CPEC and Massan railway station, serving as a gateway to Attock District and providing connections to Chakrala and Bin Hafiz Jee.

== History ==
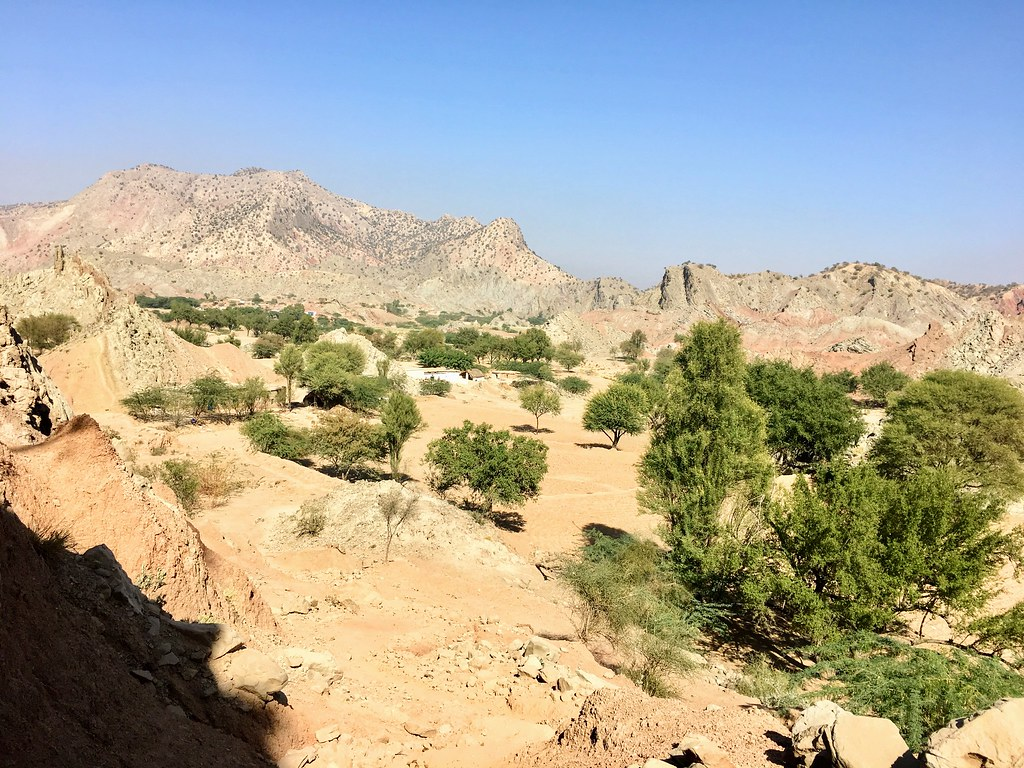
Bani Afghan landscape

The residents of Bani Afghan are indigenous to Punjab and have not been part of the refugee movements caused by the coups in Afghanistan during the 1970s or the Soviet occupation in the 1980s. The camps of the Afghan refugees are marked even in Khyber Paktunkhwa in Urdu and English. Refugees still live today, but there are various cities in Multan, Mardan on another cities of Pakistan and before 1947 in India, indigenous peoples of the Afghans or Pashtuns, who are mainly referred to in the Indian subcontinent as Rohilla or Pathan: Roh (Sanskrit) means high or peaks of the mountains and Rohilla means residents who live on high mountains. Pathan means man who is reliable. Pashtuns means sitting on the horse: rider. This people with four names (Afghan, Pathan, Rohilla and Pashtun) have lived in Iranian and Indian cultural areas for centuries and have also ruled in both cultures. Sher Shah Suri (1486 – 22 May 1545) or Sado Khan (11 October 1558 in Multan, died on 18 March 1627 in Kandahar ruled in India and also in Iran. Sado Khan was the ancestor of Dowlat Khan, grandfather of Ahmad Khan Abdali (founder of the Durrani dynasty).

Cpak in Bani Afghan was started in 2018 and completed in 2023 which passes by Bani Afghan railway station. Bani Afghan is an open vast and mountainous area.

== Other localities and cities in India and Pakistan ==
- Kala Afgana (قلعه افغانا "the Afgana Citadel")
- Ghari Afghanan (گڑھی افغانان "the Afganan Citadel") Ghari (گڑھی ) or Kala (قلعه) is for Fort. In India's history, was Nawab or rulers built such large buildings as fortresses or Cidalel. In Persian called Dazh or Arg.
- Nakkah Afghan Punjab, Pakistan
- Kiri Afghānān Punjab India
- Injra Afghan
- Afghan Kachi Basti Pakistan
- Daman Afghani Pakistan
- Bhati Afghana Narowal, Punjab, Pakistan
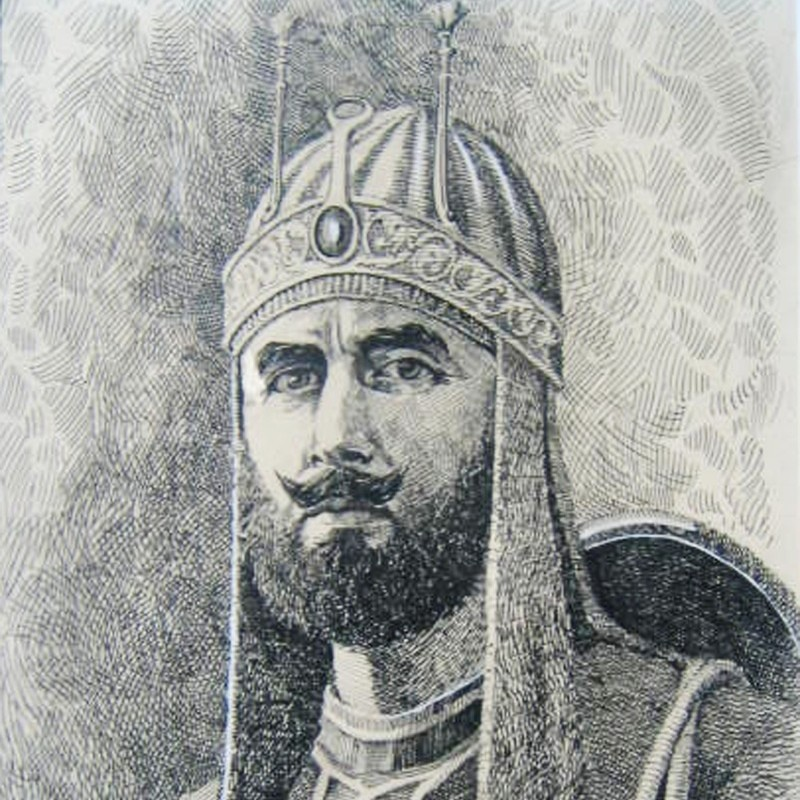
  Sher Shah Suri by Breshna
- Afghana (Jhelum) Punjab
- Fatehpur Afghanan

== See also ==
- Afghana
- Bene Israel in India
- Maghzan-e-Afghani

== Afghan refugee camps in Pakistan ==
- Afghan Refugees Camp, Pakistan Khyber Pakhtunkhwa
- Afghan Mahajrin Camp Immigrants, Pakistan
- Kalkatak Afghan Refugees Camp, Pakistan
- Khairabad Afghan Rafugees Camp, Pakistan
- Afghan Refugees Camp Number One, Balochistan, Pakistan
- Afghan Refugees Camp Number Five, Balochistan, Pakistan
- Afghan Mahajarin Camp – Balochistan, Pakistan
- Khairabad Afghan Rafugees Camp Pakistan

== Books ==
- Richardson, John. (1777). A Dictionary, Persian, Arabic, and English. Oxford: Clarendon Press. OCLC 84952352
- Adamec, Ludwig W: The A to Z of Afghan Wars, Revolutions and Insurgencies, ISBN 978-0810849488
- Frank Clements, Ludwid W. Adamec: Conflict in Afghanistan: A Historical 1.ed. Santa Barbara, 1942, ISBN 1-85109-402-4
