= Gullen khel =

Village in Mianwali District, Pakistan

Gullen khel گلن خیل is a small village in the Mianwali District of Punjab Province in Pakistan.

== Location ==
It is located some 45 km on the north of Mianwali city. Relatively larger towns of Daud Khel and Kalabagh in the vicinity are well-known than Gullen khel. Especially Kalabagh is famous because of disputed Kalabagh Dam, which was to be built in this area. Indus River flows at almost 3–4 km north west of Gullen khel near the towns of Kalabagh and Paki Shah Mardan.

== History and culture ==
Gullenkhel is a relatively new town, which started getting populated around 1940 by the migration of Awan people from the "Malkaan aali pati" ( Area of Nawab of Kalabagh) and other areas. Gullen Khel was named on the name of man Gull Muhammad who migrated from Khairabad to Gullen Khel in early 1900's. Gullen khel has one government middle school for boys and a primary school for girl students. Gullen khel is located adjacent to Pak American fertilizers industrial fertilizer manufacturing plant. It is populated on the both sides of road ( around 1 km). Since, Gullen khel is in proximity with the Pak American Fertilizers and Maple leaf cement industrial plants, trucks which transport these products to the different parts of Pakistan and to the port for export are usually parked around the road of Gullen khel. Due to this trucking activity, a number of restaurants have been developed in Gullen khel.

While most of the residents do business in transport, contractorship, and shops, etc., the youth are well educated and mostly settled in cities, predominantly in Islamabad. However, people of Gullen khel living in other cities like to be in their native town of Gullen khel at all important events such as Eid and Ashura.

== Religious harmony ==
Most of the People of Gullen khel are relative to each other. Yet, nearly 50% of the population is shia and 50% is sunni because of the conversion of the population from sunni to shia sect by the preachings of Ustad Gul Khan (a notable figure of Gullen khel who died in 1994). Originally, almost all of the people were sunni in the early 20th century. People from both sects live in peace and brotherhood. Intersect marriage is also exercised occasionally.

== Etymology ==
The word "Khel" خیل is commonly used in Mianwali for representing a place or a cast. Gullen گلن is derived from the name of someone with the same name who was among the first to live in the place which is called Gullen khel today.
