= Mohalla Khizar Khel =

- neighbourhood
- Country: Pakistan
- Region: Punjab
- District: Mianwali District
- Tehsil: Isakhel
- Union council: Khaglan Wala
- Time zone: UTC+5 (PST)

Mohalla Khizar Khel (Urdu: محله خضر خیل ) is a small neighbourhood in Khaglan Wala, Isakhel, Mianwali District, Punjab, Pakistan. Mohalla Khizar Khel is at the bank of the river kurram. It is located near Isakhel Town. One can travel to Khaglanwala from a straight road at Isakhel Bus Stop.A small mosque is also present in Mohalla Khizar Khel which is called Masjid Khizar Khel.It is named after the Niazi tribe Pashtun clan Khizar Khel.

== Inhabitants ==
Khizar Khel clan of Niazi Pakhtun tribe.
