= PP-86 Mianwali-II =

Constituency of the Punjabi Provincial Legislature, Pakistan

- Constituency for the Provincial Assembly of Punjab
- Region: Mianwali Tehsil (partly) including Daud Khel town of Mianwali District

Current constituency
- Created from: PP-44 Mianwali-II (2002-2018); PP-86 Mianwali-II (2018-)

PP-86 Mianwali-II (پی پی-86، مِيانوالى-2) is a Constituency of Provincial Assembly of Punjab.

== General elections 2024 ==
Provincial election 2024: PP-86 Mianwali-II
Party	Candidate	Votes	%	±%
Independent	Amin Ullah Khan (Note: Filed nomination papers as PTI candidate but ECP allowed him to run as an Independent)	85,387	59.25	
Independent	Adil Abdullah Khan	19,832	13.76	
Independent	Athar Yar Khan Awan	13,389	9.29	
TLP	Muhammad Tauqeer UI Hasnain Shah	13,125	9.11	
Independent	Muhammad Noman Saleem	2,563	1.78	
Others	Others (twenty four candidates)	9,811	6.81	
Turnout		148,023	56.03	
Total valid votes		144,107	97.35	
Rejected ballots		3,916	2.65	
Majority		65,555	45.49	
Registered electors		264,207		
hold				

== General elections 2018 ==
Provincial election 2018: PP-86 Mianwali-II
Party	Candidate	Votes	%	±%
PTI	Amin Ullah Khan	59,248	48.58	
Independent	Adil Abdullah Khan	27,673	22.69	
TLP	Muhammad Tauqeer UI Hasnain Shah	15,334	12.57	
Independent	Nawab Malik Amir Muhammad Khan	9,573	7.85	
Independent	Ikram Ullah Khan	4,878	4.00	
Independent	Manzoor Abbas Khan	1,939	1.59	
Others	Others (four candidates)	3,324	2.73	
Turnout		126,251	54.69	
Total valid votes		121,969	96.61	
Rejected ballots		4,282	3.39	
Majority		31,575	25.89	
Registered electors		230,850		

== General elections 2013 ==
Provincial election 2013: PP-44 Mianwali-II
Party	Candidate	Votes	%	±%
PTI	Dr. Salah U Din Khan	56,247	51.56	
PML(N)	Adil Abdullah Khan Rokhri	40,861	37.46	
Independent	Raza UI Mustafa Khan	7,706	7.06	
JI	Abdul Wahab Khan	3,234	2.96	
Others	Others (six candidates)	1,045	0.96	
Turnout		112,183	58.01	
Total valid votes		109,093	97.25	
Rejected ballots		3,090	2.75	
Majority		15,386	14.10	
Registered electors		193,385		

== General elections 2008 ==
Contesting candidates	Party affiliation	Votes polled

== See also ==
- PP-85 Mianwali-I
- PP-87 Mianwali-III
