= Nawabzada Malik Amad Khan =

Pakistani politician

Nawabzada Malik Ahmad Khan

Minister of State for Foreign Affairs
- In office July 19, 2011 – March 25, 2013
- President: Asif Ali Zardari
- Minister: Hina Rabbani Khar
- Preceded by: Hina Rabbani Khar
- Succeeded by: Hina Rabbani Khar
- In office November 4, 2008 – February 9, 2011
- President: Asif Ali Zardari
- Minister: Shah Mahmood Qureshi
- Preceded by: Makhdoom Khusro Bakhtiar
- Succeeded by: Hina Rabbani Khar

Member of the National Assembly of Pakistan
- In office 2008–2013
- Preceded by: Imran Khan
- Succeeded by: Obaidullah Shadikhel
- Constituency: NA-71 Mianwali
- Majority: 10,079 (%6.0)

Personal details
- Born: Lahore, Punjab, Pakistan
- Party: Pakistan Peoples Party

Military service
- Branch/service: Pakistan Army Armoured Corps Regiment, 26 Cavalry
- Years of service: 1992–1999

Nawabzada Malik Ahmad Khan , or simply Malik Ahmad Khan is the former Minister of State for Foreign Affairs and member of Majlis-e-Shoora from 2008 to 2013. He was one of the youngest members of the Cabinet of Pakistan.

== Early years ==
Malik Amad Awan's grandfather Malik Amir Muhammad Khan, of Kalabagh was the Governor of West Pakistan from 1960 to 1966. His uncles Malik Muzaffar Khan and Malik Allah Yar have been Members of Pakistan's parliament. His cousins Sumaira Malik and Ayla Malik were also members of the Pakistani parliament from 2002 to 2013. His mother was from the royal family of Hunza.

Having completed his secondary education in Islamabad, Khan enrolled in Pakistan Military Academy in Kakul, graduating from the school in 1992. He was then commissioned in the 26th Cavalry of Pakistan Army Armoured Corps Regiment. He resigned his commission in 1999.

== Political career ==
In February 2008, he ran as an independent and was elected to the Majlis-e-Shoora (the Pakistani Parliament) from his home constituency in Mianwali, NA-71, Mainwali-I with 83,098 votes. He later joined the Pakistan Peoples Party because of its progressive agenda. After starting his term, Malik Amad Khan has been a member of three parliamentary committees: Standing Committee on Public Accounts, Standing Committee, Standing Committee on Information & Broadcasting, and Standing Committee on Kashmir Affairs & Northern Areas. He served as the Minister of State for Foreign Affairs from November 8, 2008, to March 25, 2013.

== See also ==
- Ministry of Foreign Affairs of Pakistan
- Majlis-e-Shoora

Political offices
Preceded by Makhdoom Khusro Bakhtiar	Minister of State for Foreign Affairs; 2008 – present	Succeeded by Incumbent
