= Vanjari, Punjab =

Coordinates: 32°54′21″N 71°14′47″E

Vanjari ونجارى
- Town and union council
- Interactive map of Vanjari ونجارى
- Country: Pakistan
- Region: Punjab
- District: Mianwali District
- Time zone: UTC+5 (PST)

Vanjari (Urdu: ونجارى) is a town and union council of Mianwali District in the Punjab province of Pakistan. It is located near Kamar Mashani, a town of Mianwali District. It is part of Isakhel Tehsil and located at 32°54'21N 71°14'47E at an altitude of 268 m (882 ft). Vanjari has a population of around 5000 and is a developing town.
