= Mari Indus =

- Town
- Location within Pakistan
- Coordinates: 32.9506°N 71.5617°E
- Country: Pakistan
- Province: Punjab
- District: Mianwali
- Tehsil: Mianwali

Population
  - Total: 2,098

Mari Indus (Urdu: ماڑی اِنڈس) is a town in Mianwali District in Punjab, Pakistan, situated on bank of the Indus River near Kalabagh. It is located at 32°57 North 71°34 East and has an altitude of 206m or 679 ft.

== Ancient Hindu temples ==
Mari Indus is Historical Place of Mianwali District and historic village "Mari" or " famous for its historic ruins of Hindu civilization and temples.

== Railway ==
Mari Indus is the terminus railway station of Daud Khel-Mari Indus railway track. The length of the Daud Khel-Mari Indus railway track is approx 9.6 km. Two trains Mianwali Express (Mari Indus to Lahore), and Attock Passenger (Mari Indus to Attock) are available daily from there. Before 1991 it was also the terminus station of a 2 ft 6 in (762 mm) narrow gauge railway line which connected it with Lakki Marwat, Bannu and Tank. This railway line has been dismantled, but the Railway bridge is still being used as a road bridge.

== Politics ==
The leader of PTI in Mari Indus is Khawaja Nasir Abbas and always Pti won the election.The two major political groups here are Syed Ulfat Hussain Shah & Khawaja groups.Second party is Pmln.The leader of Pmln is Waqar Ali Zaidi and the founder of Pakistan Muslim League (N) is Haji Usman in Mari Indus.

== Sports ==
Mari Indus has a distinct identity regarding sports. People here are fond of sports. At one time, the football team of Mari Indus was famous throughout the district. moved away from and now cricket is one of the most popular sports in the Mari Indus.

Volleyball is also played with great passion but at this time cricket has reached its peak and every day big cricket tournaments are organized in Mari Indus where players from all over Pakistan participate. Maari Indus has a distinct identity regarding cricket and it would not be wrong to call it the home of cricket.

There are four cricket clubs in Mari Indus, the top one being Izhar Cricket Club which organizes All Pakistan level tournaments every year, Dosti Cricket Club, Bahadur Cricket Club and Manzoor Cricket Club. Dosti Cricket Club and Izhar Cricket Club are the oldest clubs which have been playing cricket for more or less 35 years.
