= Mohammad Zubair Khan =

Pakistani economist

Mohammad Zubair Khan is a Pakistani economist. After working briefly for the World Bank, he worked at the International Monetary Fund from 1981 to 1992, assigned to a wide range of countries, including industrial countries in northern Europe and Turkey, developing countries in south Asia, the oil producing countries in the Middle East and countries in the South Pacific region.

Since returning to Pakistan, he has been consulting for the World Bank, the Asian Development Bank, UNDP, JBIC and other international organizations on a range of issues, such as macroeconomic stabilisation policies, monetary policy, trade and exchange rate issues, fiscal and external debt sustainability, fiscal federalism, tax administration and poverty related issues. He also lectures at the Central Banks of Egypt and Sri Lanka, the National Institute of Public Administration (NIPA) campus in Lahore, the Pakistan Administrative Staff College, and the National Defence University in Islamabad.

He has been Commerce Minister of Pakistan and represented Pakistan at the first ministerial conference of the World Trade Organization. Currently, in addition to consulting, Khan is a member of the National Finance Commission, the advisory board of the Securities and Exchange Commission, Government of Pakistan, a member of the board of directors of Bank of Khyber, and a member of the Provincial Finance Commission of the Government of North-West Frontier Province. He is also a member of the Boao Boao Forum for Asia in Hainan, China.

Khan is currently managing director of Financial Techniques International. He is a popular guest on TV because of his knowledge of economics. He has a doctorate in political economy from Johns Hopkins University.

== Family ==
He is the son of the late Wali Mohammad Khan, the elder brother of late Hayat Sherpao and Aftab Sherpao who were born to the family of Khan Bahadar Ghulam Haider Khan Sherpao, a key player in the Pakistan Movement.

His family tree and cross-marriages in influential families of Pakistan are unique. He is the cousin and brother-in-law of the former President of Pakistan, the late Sardar Farooq Ahmed Khan Leghari, and uncle of Sumera Malik and Ayla Malik (granddaughters of Malik Amir Mohammed Khan of Kalabagh) both members of the National Assembly. He is also the uncle of Senator Jamal Leghari and Awais Leghari who was a Minister of Telecommunications and member of the National Assembly.

== Publications ==
- Kickstarting Pakistan's Economy. Lahore: Vanguard Books, 2001. ISBN 969-402-356-4.
- "Liberalization and Economic Crisis in Pakistan" In Rising to the Challenge in Asia: A Study of Financial Markets: Volume 9 - Pakistan. Asian Development Bank, 1999. ISBN 971-561-236-9.

Political offices
Preceded by Chaudhry Ahmed Mukhtar	Commerce Minister of Pakistan; 1996-1997	Succeeded by Ishaq Dar
