= Bohr Bungalow =

Historic 17th-century building in Punjab, Pakistan

- بوہر بنگلہ
- Interactive map of the Bohr Bungalow area

General information
- Status: Restored
- Type: Rest house
- Architectural style: Mughal-vernacular
- Location: Kalabagh riverbank, Mianwali District, Punjab, Pakistan
- Coordinates: 32.9585°N 71.5474°E
- Construction started: 17th century
- Renovated: 2010s
- Owner: Nawab family of Kalabagh

The Bohr Bungalow, also spelled as Bohar Bungalow, is a 17th-century building and historic landmark on the Indus River in Kalabagh, Punjab, Pakistan.

== History ==
It was constructed under a large, ancient banyan tree. The name Kalabagh stems from 'Kala' the Urdu term for black, and 'Bagh' meaning garden, representing the area's dark appearance due to the dense banyan trees and orchards.

The bungalow served as a resting place for the Nawab, hosting several distinguished guests such as Zulfikar Ali Bhutto, Ayub Khan, and Eleanor Roosevelt, the former First Lady of the United States, during her 1952 state visit to Pakistan. Air Force pilot, Lanky Ahmed, assisted Roosevelt during her stay.

Bohr Bungalow houses numerous historical artifacts and has recently been renovated. Other related buildings include Kalabagh Fort and Peepal Bungalow.
