= Paikhel =

- Town and union council
- Interactive map of Paikhel
- Coordinates: 32°47′16″N 71°35′8″E
- Country: Pakistan
- Region: Punjab
- District: Mianwali District
- Time zone: UTC+5 (PST)

Paikhel is a town and union council, an administrative subdivision, of Mianwali District in the Punjab province of Pakistan. It is part of Mianwali Tehsil.

== Demographics ==
The Pai khel is a town of and Niazi Pathan tribes. The people of that tribes live in Paikhel town.

Hospitality and graceful conduct are a hallmark of the area. Majority of young people are in armed forces.

The Pai khel niazi tribe sub-branches are Fathe Khan Khel, Nawab Khel, Raju Khel, Chanan Khel, Kibi Khel. Haji Ikramullah Khan Late (Ex-Provincial ministers of Punjab) belonged to Pai Khel tribe.

In Pai Khel some Awan/Jat tribes also settled, including Bajwa clan, Umer khel, Khanu Khel, Wirali, Misri Khel etc.

== History ==
The Pai khel Niazi tribe's forefather was Pai Khan Niazi. He had three brothers. His descendants were known as Sultan Khel, Bori Khan as Bori Khel and other was Gul Khan as Golay Khel who lived at Golewali.

The Pai khel tribe settled in its current location earlier in the 18th century. Like other Niazi tribes, they participated in the Third Battle of Panipat under the flag of Ahmad Shah Durrani. The tribe pursued a vendetta against the neighbored Niazi tribes. The rivalry with Taja Khel tribe is famous in local culture.
