= PP-85 Mianwali-I =

Constituency of the Punjabi Provincial Legislature, Pakistan

- Constituency for the Provincial Assembly of Punjab
- Region: Isakhel Tehsil of Mianwali District

Current constituency
- Created from: PP-43 Mianwali-I (2002-2018); PP-85 Mianwali-I (2018-)

PP-85 Mianwali-I (پی پی-85، مِيانوالى-1) is a Constituency of Provincial Assembly of Punjab.

== General elections 2024 ==
Provincial election 2024: PP-85 Mianwali-I
Party	Candidate	Votes	%	±%
Independent	Muhammad Iqbal (Note: Filed nomination papers as PTI candidate but ECP allowed him to run as an Independent)	92,550	65.45	
PML(N)	Amanat Ullah Khan	23,984	16.96	
PPP	Malik Muzammil Ali Khan	9,437	6.67	
TLP	Muhammad Amin Uddin Sialvi	6,418	4.54	
Independent	Abdul Azeem Khan Niazi	4,135	2.92	
Others	Others (eleven candidates)	4,891	3.46	
Turnout		144,711	53.13	
Total valid votes		141,415	97.72	
Rejected ballots		3,296	2.28	
Majority		68,566	48.49	
Registered electors		272,384		
hold				

== General elections 2018 ==
Provincial election 2018: PP-85 Mianwali-I
Party	Candidate	Votes	%	±%
PTI	Abdul Rehman Khan	76,122	61.52	
PML(N)	Amanat Ullah Khan	35,370	28.59	
TLP	Muhammad Khan	4,317	3.49	
MMA	Muhammad Arif	2,730	2.21	
Independent	Sohara Khan	2,144	1.73	
Independent	Abdul Karim Khan Niazi	1,316	1.06	
Others	Others (four candidates)	1,728	1.39	
Turnout		128,065	54.86	
Total valid votes		123,727	96.61	
Rejected ballots		4,338	3.39	
Majority		40,752	32.93	
Registered electors		233,431		

== General elections 2013 ==
Provincial election 2013: PP-43 Mianwali-I
Party	Candidate	Votes	%	±%
PML(N)	Amanat Ullah Khan Shadi Khel	37,100	34.54	
Independent	Abdul Rehman Khan alias Bubly Khan	36,382	33.87	
PTI	Muhammad Jamal Ahsan Khan Isa Khel	31,122	28.97	
JI	Muhammad Khurshid Ahmad Khan	2,311	2.15	
Others	Others (two candidates)	508	0.47	
Turnout		112,718	58.21	
Total valid votes		107,423	95.30	
Rejected ballots		5,295	4.70	
Majority		718	0.67	
Registered electors		193,648		

== General elections 2008 ==
Contesting candidates	Party affiliation	Votes polled

== See also ==
- PP-84 Khushab-IV
- PP-86 Mianwali-II
