= Muzafarpur =

Muzafarpur may refer to

- Muzafarpur Janubi, Mianwali District, Punjab, Pakistan.
- Muzafarpur Shumali, Mianwali District, Punjab, Pakistan.
- Muzaffarpur, Bihar, India
