= Chhidru =

Coordinates: 32°32′36″N 71°46′25″E

Chhidru چهِدرُو
- Village and union council
- Interactive map of Chhidru چهِدرُو
- Country: Pakistan
- Region: Punjab
- District: Mianwali Mianwali District
- Time zone: UTC+5 (PST)
- Postal code: 4200

Chhidru (Urdu: چهِدرُو) is a village and union council of Mianwali District in the Punjab province of Pakistan. It is part of Mianwali Tehsil and located at 32°32'36N 71°46'25E. It is famous for its tribal friction and ritual warfare. Well known clans are Goley Khel, Naurang Khail, kheskhy Khail, Shahjahan Khail, Hayatu Khail, Taru Khail, Awan, Bhatti, Mughal, Aheer, Dhatu Khail,
