= Yaru Khel =

Pakistani village

Coordinates: 32°35′0″N 71°31′0″E

Yaru Khel يارُوخيل
- Village and Union Council
- Interactive map of Yaru Khel يارُوخيل
- Country: Pakistan
- Region: Punjab
- District: Mianwali District

Government

Population
  - Total: 10,000 above
- Time zone: UTC+5 (PST)

Yaru Khel (Urdu: يارُوخيل), is a village and union council of Mianwali District in the Punjab province of Pakistan. It is part of Mianwali Tehsil.
