= Chapri, Mianwali =

- Village and union council
- Location in Pakistan
- Country: Pakistan
- Region: Punjab
- District: Mianwali District
- Tehsil: Isakhel Tehsil
- 2015: 19 Nov 2015

Government
  - Type: Local Body
  - Chairman: Haji Muhammad Iqbal Khan
  - Vice Chairman: Rafi Ullah Khan

Population (2017)
  - Total: 13,243 (Chapri Village)
- Time zone: UTC+5 (PST)

Chapri, meaning "hut" in English, is a village and union council of the Mianwali District in the Punjab province of Pakistan. It is located in Isakhel Tehsil at 32°58′46″N 71°23′28″E, and lies about 17 km from Kalabagh and Qamar Mashani on two separate roads. The people of the area are educated and hard working. Most of the people are employed in the Army, apart from doing jobs in other government departments. Chapri lies adjacent to Karak District of Khyber Pakhtunkhwa.
