= Tola Bhangi Khel =

Tola Bangi Khel Baangi Khel
- Town and union council
- Country: Pakistan
- Region: Punjab
- District: Mianwali District
- Time zone: UTC+5 (PST)

Tola Bangi Khel is a town and union council, an administrative subdivision, of Mianwali District in the Punjab province of Pakistan. It is part of Isakhel Tehsil.

As part of the mineral-rich Mianwali, iron ore is mined in Tola Bangi Khel.
