= Shadia, Punjab =

Coordinates: 32°22′46″N 71°45′39″E

Shadia
- Town and union council
- Interactive map of Shadia
- Country: Pakistan
- Region: Punjab
- District: Mianwali District
- Time zone: UTC+5 (PST)

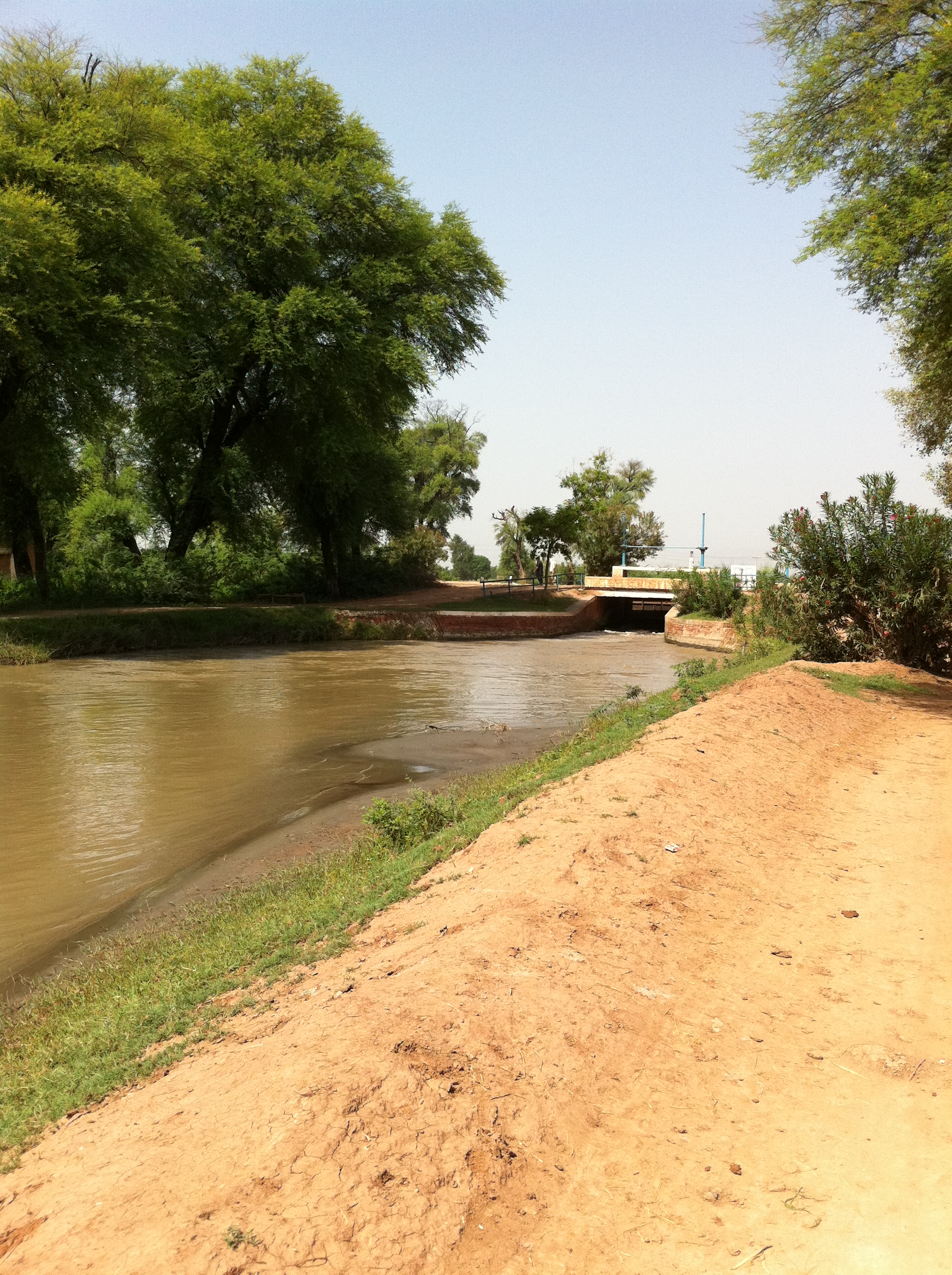

Shadia is a union council of the Mianwali District in the Punjab province of Pakistan. It is part of the Mianwali Tehsil subdivision and is located at 32°22'46N 71°45'39E and has an altitude of 198 metres (652 ft) and a population of approximately 17,783.

Shadia may have been named after the word shadi which means marriage in Urdu/Punjabi. In the 18th century Shadia was famous for frequent marriage processions to adjacent villages and places such as Bandial, Okhli Mohla, or Jabbi Dhokri. Shadia was a hub for matrimonial ceremonies, as well as a resting place for caravans.

According to another tradition the village is called Shadia because there used to be a lamp or deeya on the grave of a syed, commonly known as the Shah. The name shah da deeya was gradually corrupted to Shadia.

The union council of Shadia consists of Shadia itself as well as other surrounding villages: Dhakuwa Wala, Pakka Sandanwala, Muhammad Shah, Dera Bhattian Wala, Bhouki, Chak No.1, Chak No.2, Chak No.3, Chak No.4, Chak Qudrat Abad, Chandni, Maira, Taala, and Dera Jaat.

Much of the land in Shadia and its environs is irrigated by the Chashma Mohajir branch canal, though some of Shadia's soil is desert and is irrigated by rainwater only. Shadia has fertile lands which yield seasonal crops, such as kinos (mandarins) and oranges of all types, wheat, sugar cane, cotton, rice, channa and guara. Shadia is particularly famous for its mandarin orchards, which are the second largest in Pakistan after Sargodha.

Another prominent site in Shadia is one of Asia's oldest graveyards, Wanjhara. It is believed Wanjhara was built on a ruined city which was devastated in an earthquake centuries ago, and several times during

The citizens of this village mostly belong to Jutt Tribe such as Janjua, Saand, Bhatti, Poora, Sui, Natal, Langrial, Bhachar, Podha etc. and the language of these people is Punjabi
