= Mari, Punjab =

Coordinates: 32°57′32″N 71°35′7″E

Mari, Punjab Marwari
- Village and union council
- Old Mari Indus
- Location in Pakistan
- Country: Pakistan
- Region: Punjab
- District: Mianwali District
- Time zone: UTC+5 (PST)

Mari (Urdu: ماڑی) is a village and union council of Mianwali District in the Punjab province of Pakistan. It is also known as "Old Mari Indus".

Mari is situated 2 kilometers from Mari Indus town on the bank of the Indus River. It is located at 32°57'32N 71°35'7E at an altitude of 234 m (770 ft). This village is famous for its historic ruins of Hindu civilization.
