= Shadab Khan =

Pakistani cricketer (born 1998)

Shadab Khan شاداب خان
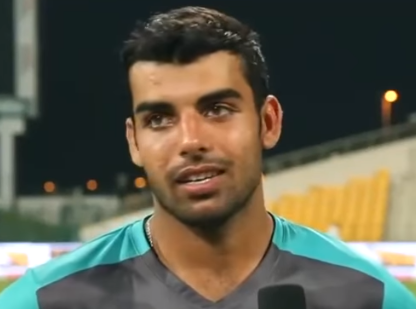
- Khan in 2017

Personal information
- Born: 4 October 1998 (age 28); Kamar Mushani, Punjab, Pakistan
- Nickname: Shaddy
- Height: 1.78 m (5 ft 10 in)
- Batting: Right-handed
- Bowling: Right-arm leg break
- Role: All-rounder
- Relatives: Saqlain Mushtaq (father-in-law)

International information
- National side: Pakistan (2017–present)
- Test debut (cap 227): 30 April 2017 v West Indies
- Last Test: 5 August 2020 v England
- ODI debut (cap 211): 7 April 2017 v West Indies
- Last ODI: 25 October 2026 v England
- ODI shirt no.: 7 (prev. 29)
- T20I debut (cap 73): 26 March 2017 v West Indies
- Last T20I: 11 October 2026 v Sri Lanka
- T20I shirt no.: 7 (prev. 29)

Domestic team information
- Years: Team
- 2017–present: Islamabad United
- 2017: Trinbago Knight Riders
- 2017/18: Brisbane Heat
- 2019: Guyana Amazon Warriors
- 2019/20: Dhaka Platoon
- 2021/22: Sydney Sixers
- 2022: Yorkshire
- 2022/23: Hobart Hurricanes
- 2023: Sussex
- 2023: Birmingham Phoenix
- 2023: San Francisco Unicorns
- 2023/24: Desert Vipers
- 2024: Colombo Strikers
- 2025/26: Sydney Thunder
- 2026: Lancashire
- 2026: Antigua & Barbuda Falcons

Career statistics
Competition	Test	ODI	T20I	T20
Matches	6	74	126	378
Runs scored	300	1,068	1,009	4,208
Batting average	33.33	31.41	19.03	19.66
100s/50s	0/3	1/5	0/1	0/15
Top score	56	113*	52	91
Balls bowled	954	3,586	2,461	7,638
Wickets	14	87	125	422
Bowling average	36.64	35.96	24.34	22.68
5 wickets in innings	0	0	0	1
10 wickets in match	0	0	0	0
Best bowling	3/31	4/27	4/8	5/28
Catches/stumpings	3/–	20/–	45/–	144/–
Medal record
Men's cricket
Representing Pakistan
ICC T20 World Cup
Runner-up	2022 Australia
ICC Champions Trophy
Winner	2017 England & Wales
ACC Asia Cup
Runner-up	2022 UAE
- Source: Cricinfo, 25 October 2026

Shadab Khan (Note: Urdu: شاداب خان, romanized: Shadāb Khān pronounced [ʃaːdaːb xaːɳ]) (born 4 October 1998) is a Pakistani cricketer. He is an all-rounder, who bats right-handed and bowls right-arm leg break. Khan is the vice-captain of Pakistan national team in T20Is and captains Islamabad United in the Pakistan Super League. He was a member of the Pakistani squad that won the 2017 Champions Trophy.

== Early life ==
Shadab Khan was born on 4 October 1998 into a Punjabi Muslim family in Kamar Mushani in the Mianwali District of Punjab, Pakistan. In 2008, his family shifted from Kamar Mushani to Rawalpindi where Khan joined Bajwa Cricket Club, a local cricket academy. He then joined the Siddiq-e-Akbar Academy and was later selected in the U19 team of Attock district.

Khan can speak Punjabi, Urdu and English. In August 2025, he completed his diploma in business management from Inspire London College (ILC).

== Youth career ==
In the U19 tri-nation tournament in the UAE (Jan 16, 2016), Pakistan U19s beat Australia U19s by 109 runs after posting 311. Khan led the defence with a decisive spell of 4 for 35, using flight and variation to help bowl Australia out for 202 and secure Pakistan's first win of the event.

In a 2016 Cricinfo feature profile, Khan was noted as Pakistan's emerging "mystery" leg spinner, outlining his repertoire (leg-break, googly, flipper) and how he uses flight, variation, and control rather than just pace through the air.

== Domestic and franchise career ==
On 26 August 2016, he made his Twenty20 debut for Rawalpindi in the 2016–17 National T20 Cup.

After his impressive performance in the 2017 ICC Champions Trophy, he was signed to play for Trinbago Knight Riders in the 2017 Caribbean Premier League. Later in 2017, Khan signed with the Brisbane Heat for the 7th season of the Big Bash League.

In June 2019, Khan was selected to play for the Edmonton Royals franchise team in the 2019 Global T20 Canada tournament.

=== Pakistan Super League ===
An analysis of PSL 2020 notes Khan's return to form with the bat, elevated to No. 4 for Islamabad United. He produced a run of impactful innings, mixing boundary-hitting with smarter rotation, while still offering utility leg-spin. It was thus argued that his batting evolution (range against pace and spin, better tempo control) points to a genuine all-rounder trajectory rather than a bowler who bats.

In December 2021, he was named the captain of Islamabad United following the players' draft for the 2021 Pakistan Super League.

In the PSL 2025 10th match at Karachi on 20 April 2025, Islamabad United beat Karachi Kings by six wickets (129/4 in 17.1 overs, chasing 128/7). Khan was Player of the Match for a decisive 2 for 17 with the ball and a composed 47 off 40 in the chase, leading United to a comfortable win.

During the PSL 2026 Khan was noted for his all-round performance: he scored 173 runs in eight innings at an average of 34.60 and a strike rate of 141.80, including one half-century, while also taking 17 wickets at a bowling average of 14.47 and an economy rate of 7.02. He was one of Islamabad United's leading all-round performers during the season, contributing with both bat and ball as the team finished second in the league stage.

== International career ==
In the 2nd unofficial Test at Bulawayo (Oct 15–18, 2016), Shadab Khan dominated for Pakistan A, scoring his maiden first-class century (129) in a total of 512 and then returning 5 wickets in Zimbabwe A's second innings to seal an eight-wicket win and a 1–0 series result. The match report highlighted his flight and variation with the ball and his counterattacking lower-order batting as the decisive factors.

He made his Twenty20 International (T20I) debut for Pakistan against the West Indies on 26 March 2017. Taking 3 wickets for 7 runs in his spell, he recorded the most economical figures for a bowler completing their four overs on debut in a T20I, and was Player of the Match. The following month, he was added to Pakistan's Test squad for their series against the West Indies.

Khan made his One Day International (ODI) debut for Pakistan against the West Indies on 7 April 2017. He made his Test debut for Pakistan, also against the West Indies, on 30 April 2017. He was part of Pakistan's 2017 Champions Trophy winning squad. In September 2017, he was named the PCB's Emerging Player of the Year.

On 16 October 2017, against Sri Lanka, Khan scored his maiden ODI fifty. Khan, along with Babar Azam, made a partnership of 109 and slowly built the innings towards 200. When bowling, Khan took early breakthroughs in the low-scoring game taking three wickets. Pakistan won the match by 32 runs and Khan was adjudged the man of the match for his all-round performances.

In the 3rd T20I at Dubai on 28 Oct 2018, Pakistan completed a 3–0 sweep over Australia, winning by 33 runs after posting 150/5 (Babar Azam 50). Khan led the defence with a match-turning 3 for 19 in four overs, throttling Australia's chase to 117 all out and headlining Pakistan's clean sweep.

In April 2019, Khan was named to Pakistan's squad for the 2019 Cricket World Cup. Three days after Khan was named in Pakistan's World Cup squad, he was ruled out of Pakistan's preceding tour of England with a virus. He was replaced by Yasir Shah for the matches against England. Ahead of the third ODI match against England, Pakistan's captain, Sarfaraz Ahmed, confirmed that Khan had recovered and would be fit enough to play at the World Cup. On 23 June 2019, in Pakistan's World Cup match against South Africa, Khan took his 50th wicket in ODIs.

In June 2020, Khan was named in a 29-man squad for Pakistan's tour to England during the COVID-19 pandemic. However, on 22 June 2020, Khan was one of three players from Pakistan's squad to test positive for COVID-19. Although he had shown no previous symptoms of the virus, he was advised to go into a period of self-isolation. In July, he was shortlisted for Pakistan's 20-man squad for the Test matches against England.

On 28 August 2020, in the first T20I match against England, Khan took his 50th wicket in the format.

On 18 December 2020, Khan captained the Pakistan team for the first time in an international match, when he led the team in the first Twenty20 International (T20I) against New Zealand during Babar's injury.

In September 2021, Khan was named the vice-captain of Pakistan's squad for the 2021 ICC Men's T20 World Cup.

In 2022, Khan was amongst the players centrally contracted by the Pakistan Cricket Board (PCB).

A post–2022 Asia Cup final analysis argues Khan had “got his groove back,” highlighting his all-round resurgence through the tournament: sharper leg-spin control and wicket-taking googlies, renewed batting impact in the middle order, and high-energy fielding/leadership that underpinned Pakistan's run to the final, even if the title match went Sri Lanka's way.

On 27 March 2023, he took his 100th T20I wicket against Afghanistan, and became the first male cricketer from Pakistan to take 100 wickets in T20Is.

In May 2024, he was named in Pakistan's squad for the 2024 ICC Men's T20 World Cup tournament.

In October 2026, Khan was named Player of the Match in the second match against England in a home ODI tri-series that also included Sri Lanka. He scored his maiden ODI century, as he remained not out on 113 runs off 96 balls, including 13 fours and five sixes, at the Gaddafi Stadium. He set a record for the highest 10th-wicket partnership in a successful ODI chase with his unbroken 89-run stand with Haris Rauf.

== Playing style ==
In late September 2019, Khan said he aimed to become a genuine all-rounder for Pakistan, stressing ongoing work on his batting alongside his leg-spin so he can contribute in multiple roles and improve team balance. He cites Australian cricketer Steve Smith as inspiration in this process.

Often regarded as better suited to shorter formats, Khan has been described as Pakistan's “Mr T20” due to his versatility across roles. He provides wicket-taking leg-spin during the middle overs, utilizing variations such as the googly and changes of pace. In addition, he adjusts his position in the batting order to exploit match-ups, contributes late-order hitting and strike rotation, and offers strong fielding and on-field leadership. Collectively, these attributes enhance Pakistan's overall balance in T20 cricket.

=== Bowling ===
Considering former Australian international Shane Warne to be his role-model, Khan is a leg-spinner who relies on generous flight and aerial deception, varying his release and use of the crease, both close to and wide of the stumps, to disrupt a batter's eye-line. In an April 2017 interview, Khan said his celebrated googly is not his only weapon; he emphasized that his leg-break and flipper are also wicket-taking options.

=== Fielding ===
Khan is regarded as one of the best fielders in Pakistan. Khan has been noted for raising Pakistan's fielding standards. As a teenager in the Pakistan Super League he drew attention for agile, attacking work and direct hits from backward point, and he has since been regarded as one of the team's leading fielders.

=== Batting ===
Khan began his international career primarily as a bowling all-rounder but has gradually developed into a more substantial batting option in limited-overs cricket. His batting is characterised by aggressive stroke-play, power-hitting against spin, and the ability to accelerate scoring in the middle and death overs. It was noted that, during periods of reduced effectiveness with the ball, Khan's batting remained an important asset for Pakistan, contributing to his selection as a batting all-rounder. His 71 against Australia in the second ODI of the 2026 home series was cited as an example of his growing value with the bat.

== Personal life ==
On 23 January 2023, he married Malaika Saqlain, daughter of cricket coach and former international cricketer Saqlain Mushtaq.
