= Tanikhel =

Tanikhel تانى خيل
- Town and union council
- Country: Pakistan
- Region: Punjab
- District: Mianwali District
- Time zone: UTC+5 (PST)

Tanikhel (Urdu: تانى خيل), is a town and union council, an administrative subdivision, of Mianwali District in the Punjab province of Pakistan. It is part of Isakhel Tehsil.

Tanikel was one of the Isakhel towns affected during the 2022 floods.
