= Tabisar =

Coordinates: 33°9′0″N 71°34′0″E

- Town and union council
- Interactive map of Tabisar
- Country: Pakistan
- Region: Mianwali
- District: Mianwali District
- Time zone: UTC+5 (PST)

Tabisar is a town and union council of Mianwali District, Punjab, Pakistan. Part of Isakhel Tehsil, it is located at 33 08'50.97"N 71°33 40.69"E at an altitude of 686 m (2,250 ft).
