= Kamar Mushani Pakka =

Kamar Mushani Pakka كمرمشانى پكّا
- Town and union council
- Country: Pakistan
- Region: Punjab
- District: Mianwali District
- Time zone: UTC+5 (PST)

Kamar Mushani Pakka (Urdu: كمرمشانى پكّا) is a town and Union Council of Mianwali District in the Punjab province of Pakistan. The Union Council is an administrative subdivision of Isakhel Tehsil.
