= Mochh =

Mochh موچھ
- Town and union council
- Country: Pakistan
- Region: Punjab
- District: Mianwali District
- Time zone: UTC+5 (PST)

Mochh (Urdu: موچھ) is a town and union council, an administrative subdivision, of Mianwali District in the Punjab province of Pakistan. It is part of Mianwali Tehsil and located north of the district capital at 32°44'49N 71°30'51E and lies east of the Indus River.
