= Amin Ullah Khan =

Pakistani politician

- آمین اللہ خان نیازی

Member of the Provincial Assembly of Punjab
- Incumbent
- Assumed office 20 March 2024
- Constituency: PP-86 Mianwali-II

Member of the Provincial Assembly of Punjab
- In office 15 August 2018 – 14 January 2023
- Constituency: PP-86 Mianwali-II

Nazim Union Council Daud Khel
- In office 2005–2010

Personal details
- Born: 15 May 1971 (age 55) Mianwali, Punjab, Pakistan
- Party: PTI (2018-present)
- Relations: Sanaullah Khan Niazi (brother); Imran Khan (cousin)
- Education: University of Balochistan (LL.B, M.A.)

Amin Ullah Khan is a Pakistani businessman and politician who has been Nazim Union Council Daud Khel from 2005 to 2010 and a member of the Provincial Assembly of the Punjab from 20 March 2024. He is the brother of Major General Sanaullah Khan Niazi and paternal cousin of former Prime Minister Imran Ahmed Khan Niazi.

== Early life ==
Amin Ullah Khan was born on 15 May 1971 in Daud Khel, Mianwali, West Pakistan to SSP Khan Ikhlas Khan. He has 3 brothers, notably former Deputy IG Quetta Police Rehmat Ullah Khan Niazi, Major General Sanaullah Khan Niazi and Madad Khan.

== Education ==
Amin Ullah graduated from the University of Balochistan with an LL.B in 1994 and M.A. in 1997.

== Political career ==
Amin Ullah served as Nazim Union Council Daud Khel from 2005 to 2010.

He was elected to the Provincial Assembly of Punjab as a candidate of the PTI from PP-86 Mianwali-II in the 2018 Punjab provincial election.

Amin Ullah again contested the Provincial Assembly seat from PP-86 Mianwali-II as a PTI candidate in the 2024 Punjab provincial election and secured a landslide victory, receiving 85,318 votes.
