= Chapri =

Chapri can ref to:

- Chapri, Mianwali, village of Mianwali, Punjab, Pakistan
- Chapri, Nowshera, village of Nowshera, Khyber Pakhtunkhwa, Pakistan
