= Kot Chandna =

Kot Chandna كوٹ چاندنہ
- Location within Pakistan
- Coordinates: 32.56°N 71.30°E
- Country: Pakistan
- Province: Punjab
- District: Mianwali
- Elevation: 191 m (627 ft)
- Time zone: UTC+5 (PST)

Kot Chandna (Urdu: كوٹ چاندنہ) is a small town and union council of Mianwali District in the Punjab province of Pakistan. It is part of Isakhel Tehsil and is located at 32°56'27N 71°30'13E at an altitude of 191 metres (629 feet)

Kot Chandna is located on the right bank of the Indus River, near Jinnah Barrage and Kalabagh. A provincial highway connects it with Mianwali and Khyber Pakhtunkhwa. Life in Kot Chandna is a mixture of Punjabi and Pashtun culture. There is a camp for Afghan refugees and a hydro power plant near Kot Chandna.
