= Watta Khel =

Coordinates: 32°34′0″N 71°31′0″E

Watta Khel وتہ خيل
- Village and union council
- Interactive map of Watta Khel وتہ خيل
- Country: Pakistan
- Region: Punjab
- District: Mianwali District
- Time zone: UTC+5 (PST)

Watta Khel (Urdu: وتّہ خيل), is a village and union council of Mianwali District in the Punjab province of Pakistan. It is part of Mianwali Tehsil and is located at 32°34'0N 71°31'0E.
