= Mianwali Tehsil =

Administrative sub-division of Punjab, Pakistan

تحصِيل مِيانوالى
- Tehsil
- Mianwali Tehsil
- Country: Pakistan
- Region: Punjab
- District: Mianwali
- Capital: Mianwali
- Towns: 2
- Union councils: 26

Population (2023 Pakistani Census)
  - Total: 908,405
- Time zone: UTC+5 (PST)

Mianwali Tehsil (Urdu: تحصِيل مِيانوالى), is an administrative subdivision (tehsil) of Mianwali District in the Punjab province of Pakistan.

Population of Mianwali Tehsil is 908,405 as per 2023 Pakistani Census. The tehsil is subdivided into 2 Municipal committees and 26 Union Councils.

== Administration ==
The tehsil of Mianwali is administratively subdivided into 2 Municipal Commeteis MC Mianwali MC Daud Khel and 26 Union Councils, these are:

- Abbakhel
- Ban Hafiz Jee
- Chakrala
- Chhidru
- Paki Shah Mardan
- Dher Umid Ali Shah
- Gulmiri
- Mari Indus
- Mochh
- Musakhel
- Muzafarpur Janubi
- Muzafarpur Shumali
- Namal
- Paikhel
- Rokhri
- Shadia
- Shahbaz Khel
- Swans
- Thamewali
- Wan Bhachran
- Watta Khel
- Yaru Khel
