= Sanaullah Khan Niazi =

Pakistani general (1960–2013)

Major General Sanaullah Khan Niazi HI(M) SBt
- ثناء اللہ خان نیازی

General Officer Commanding 17th Infantry Division
- In office February 2013 – 15 September 2013
- Succeeded by: Ghulam Qamar (temporarily); Javed Mahmood Bukhari

Personal details
- Born: 10 September 1960 Daud Khel, Mianwali, West Pakistan
- Died: 15 September 2013 (aged 53) Upper Dir District, Khyber Pakhtunkhwa, Pakistan
- Cause of death: Assassination
- Resting place: Daud Khel
- Children: 2
- Relatives: Amin Ullah Khan (brother); Imran Khan (cousin)
- Education: Officers Training School, Mangla; Command and Staff College Quetta; National Defence University, Pakistan; National Defense University (Republic of China)
- Known for: Establishing peace in Swat and Malakand; Launching development projects in Swat and Malakand
- Awards: See list
- Nickname: Soldiers' General

Military service
- Branch/service: Pakistan Army
- Years of service: 1983–2013
- Rank: Major General
- Unit: Baloch Regiment
- Battles/wars: United Nations peacekeeping; Angola Verification Mission III; Observer Mission in Sierra Leone; Insurgency in Khyber Pakhtunkhwa; Operation al-Mizan; Operation Rah-e-Haq; Operation Rah-e-Rast

Major General Sana Ullah Khan Niazi (Note: Urdu: ثناء اللہ خان نیازی) (10 September 1960 – 15 September 2013), also known as "Soldiers' General", was a two-star rank general in the Pakistan Army, serving as the General Officer Commanding of the 17th Division in Malakand from February 2013 until his assassination in a roadside blast. Lieutenant Colonel Tauseef and Lance Naik Irfan were also killed in the blast while two other officers were injured.

Niazi was posthumously awarded the Sitara-e-Basalat and Hilal-i-Imtiaz on Pakistan Day in 2014 and 2015. He is renowned for clearing the Malakand District division of militants in less than seven months and overseeing the security of 50,000 tourists. Additionally, he was known for launching a sports Gala and reopening the Kabal Golf Course for the youth of Swat, which subsequently led to the valley holding a national golf tournament after 20 years as well as an art exhibition for the first time in Swat's history.

Sanaullah is the brother of Amin Ullah Khan and paternal cousin of former Prime Minister Imran Khan.

== Early life ==
Sanaullah Khan Niazi was born on 10 September 1960 in Mianwali into a Pashtun Niazi family. His father, SSP Khan Ikhlas Khan, was a police officer who served in Quetta for most of his career and was known as "fearless" for arresting Nawab Akbar Bugti in the 1970s.

Sanaullah has three brothers, Rehmat Ullah Khan Niazi who at the time of Sanaullah's death was the Deputy Inspector General of the Quetta Police, Amin Ullah Khan and Madad Khan. One of his paternal cousins is former cricketer and 19th Prime Minister of Pakistan Imran Khan.

== Personal life ==
Sanaullah is survived by his widow and two daughters.

His former staff officer, Colonel Moeen Yusuf Khan, recalled that Sanaullah was a difficult man to make angry and very easy to make happy, adding that he was a car enthusiast.

== Military career ==
Upon completing the 12th course of the Officers Training School, Mangla on 11 December 1983, Sanaullah was commissioned into the Pakistan Army in the 11 Baloch Regiment. He was awarded the Chief of Army Staff Cane by General Zia-ul-Haq for achieving second place in the course.

Sanaullah graduated from the Command and Staff College Quetta in 1994, National Defence University, Pakistan, and the National Defense University (Republic of China) in 2012.

Throughout his career, he held various key positions, including General Staff Officer Grade II at the Chief of General Staff secretariate, Director of Military Training for Combat at the Military Training Directorate, and Brigade Major of an Infantry Brigade twice. In addition, he commanded an infantry battalion and an independent infantry brigade group, served as a United Nations Military Observer with MONUA and Contingent Commander with United Nations Observer Mission in Sierra Leone, and was a faculty member at the Pakistan Military Academy. He was also an instructor at the School of Infantry and Tactics and the Command and Staff College Quetta.

Brigadier Niazi was promoted to the rank of Major General on 14 July 2012.

On 9 September 2013, Sanaullah inaugurated the Jashn-i-Kumrat sports festival in Upper Dir District. Addressing the 3,000 participants, he stated, "terrorists wouldn't be allowed to disturb peace of the area" and added that the festival would promote peace and tourism in the district.

== Legacy ==
Major General Sanaullah was credited for establishing peace along with reviving tourism in the Swat Valley. He was further known for working tirelessly in the recovery efforts and bringing back the residents of Swat who were evacuated after the army launched an operation to clear the area from the occupation of militants.

He is also regarded as the pioneer of the Malam Jabba Snow Festival, which was the first cultural event that took place after the military operation. In a short span of seven months, he cleared the Malakand division of militants and oversaw the security of 50,000 tourists. He launched a sports Gala for the youth and reopened the Kabal Golf Course which subsequently led to Swat Valley holding a national golf tournament for the first time in 20 years. Additionally, an art exhibition took place for the first time in Swat's history.

== Assassination ==
After staying two nights above 10,000ft at Malatar troop post to boost the morale of soldiers following a deadly attack which killed 18 soldiers a year earlier, Sanaullah and Lt Col Touseef Ahmed were travelling to the Battalion Headquarters of 33 Baloch which Touseef was the Commanding Officer of, from the Upper Dir District along the Afghan border when their vehicle drove over a bomb at 12:30pm, planted by the Pakistani Taliban, killing them along with their driver Lance Naik Irfan Sattar (33 Baloch) and injuring Havildar Ilyas and Havildar Ghaffar. They were all airlifted to a military hospital in Rawalpindi.

=== Funeral ===
The Islamic funeral for Sanaullah, Lt. Colonel Tauseef, and Lance Naik Irfan was held on 16 September 2013 and attended by army personnel, police officers, politicians and civilians.

Military personnel laid floral wreaths on his grave on behalf of President Mamnoon Hussain, Chief of Army Staff General Kayani, Chief of Air Staff Tahir Rafique Butt, Chief of Naval Staff Asif Sandila, and Chairman Joint Chiefs of Staff Committee Khalid Shameem Wynne. At an event later that evening, General Kayani stated, "The General Officer has set towering example of leading from the front which is hallmark of leadership in Pakistan Army, we all salute his bravery."

=== Aftermath ===
In June 2018, the planner of the attack was killed in Afghanistan by a US Army drone strike. The militant who planted the device was arrested and sentenced to death on 15 December 2018.

== Memorials ==
Sanaullah Colony, Maj Gen Sanaullah Khan Niazi Shaheed Cricket tournament, Maj Gen Sanaullah Memorial Football tournament, Maj Gen Sanaullah Khan Niazi Shaheed Toll Plaza, and Maj Gen Sanaullah Khan Niazi Shaheed Interchange are named after him.

== Awards and decorations ==

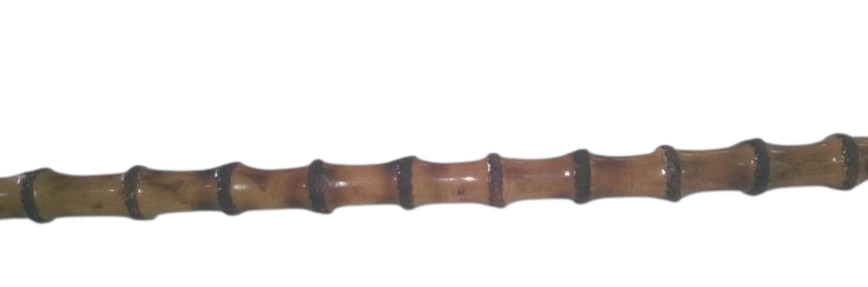

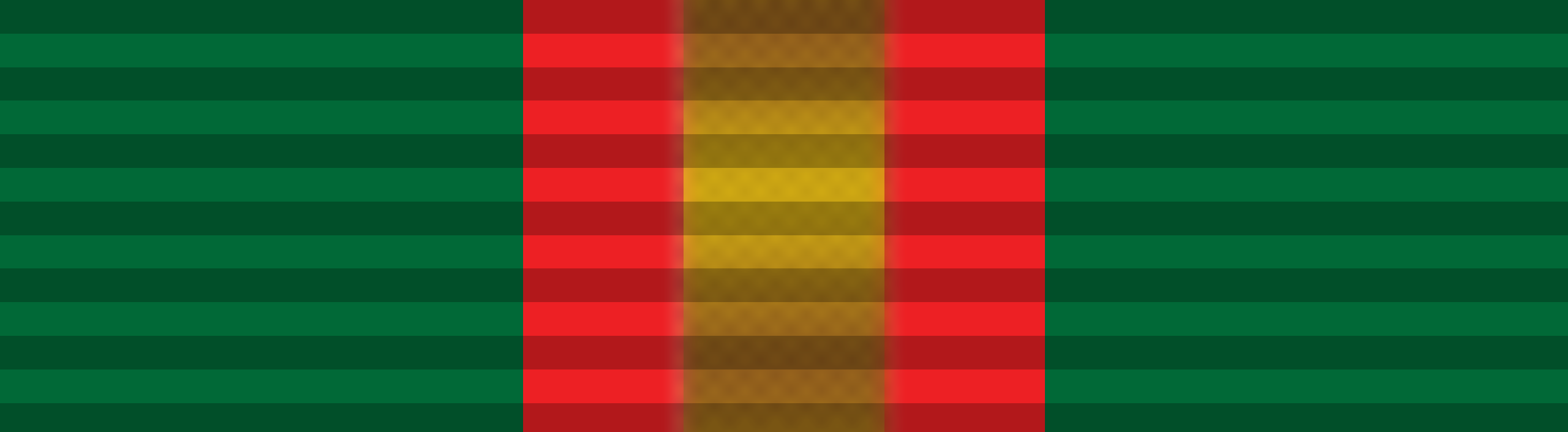

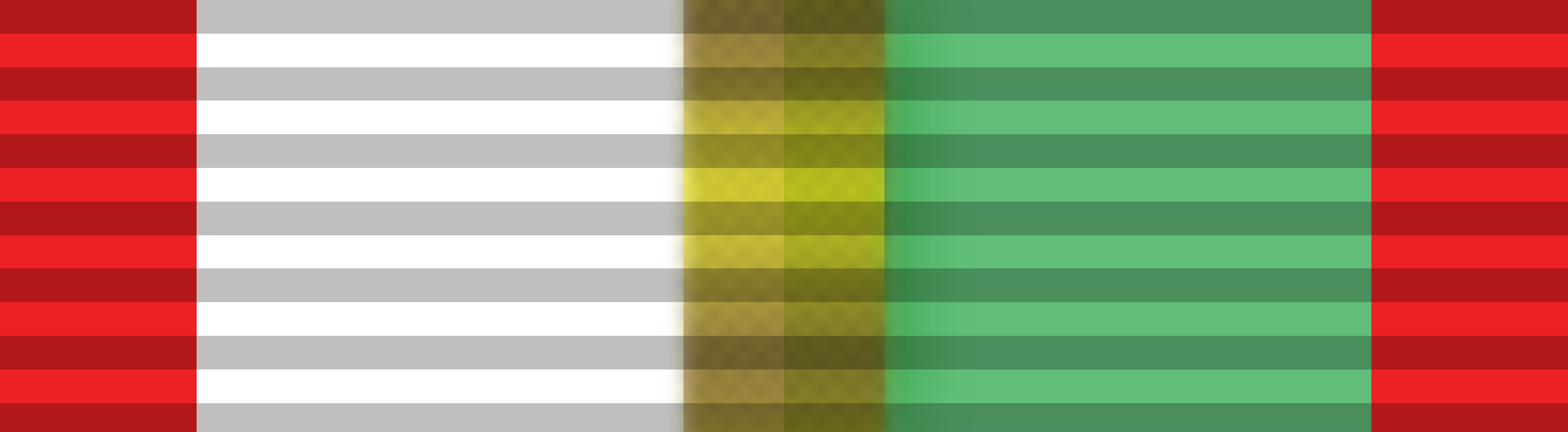

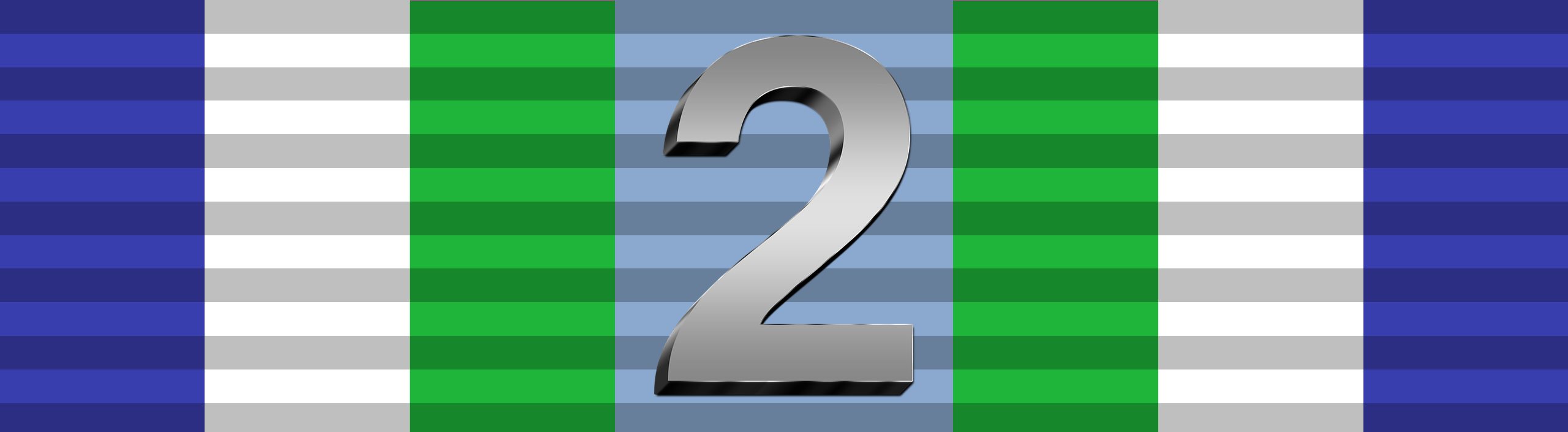

| Hilal-i-Imtiaz (Military) (Crescent of Excellence) (Posthumously) 2015 | | Sitara-e-Basalat (Star of Valour) (Posthumously); 2014 | |
| COAS Cane (12th OTS) 1983 | Tamgha-e-Jamhuriat (Democracy Medal) 1988 | Qarardad-e-Pakistan Tamgha (Resolution Day) (Golden Jubilee Medal) 1990 | Tamgha-e-Salgirah Pakistan (Independence Day Golden Jubilee Medal) 1997 |
| Tamgha-e-Baqa (Nuclear Test Medal) 1998 | UNAVEM III (UNMO Medal) (2 deployments) | UNOMSIL Medal (Contingent Commander) (2 deployments) | Tamgha-e-Istaqlal Pakistan (2001–2002 India–Pakistan standoff) |
| Command and Staff College Quetta Instructor's Medal | Tamgha-e-Diffa (Defence Medal) Siachen Glacier Clasp | 10 Years Service Medal | 20 Years Service Medal |

=== Foreign decorations ===
Foreign Awards
| UN | UNAVEM III |
| UN | UNOMSIL |
