= Jamal Ahsan Khan Isakhel =

Muhammad Jamal Ahsan Khan Pakistani PTI politician

- جمال احسن خان عیسیٰ خیل

Member of the National Assembly of Pakistan
- Incumbent
- Assumed office 29 February 2024
- Preceded by: Imran Khan
- Constituency: NA-89 Mianwali-I

Personal details
- Other political affiliations: PTI (2002-present)

Muhammad Jamal Ahsan Khan Isakhel (Urdu: محمد جمال احسن خان عیسیٰ خیل), also known as Muhammad Jamal Ahsan Khan Niazi, is a Pakistani politician who has been a member of the National Assembly of Pakistan since February 2024 won as PTI backed IND but later joined PML-N

== Political career ==
He was elected to the National Assembly of Pakistan from NA-89 Mianwali-I as an independent candidate supported by Pakistan Tehreek-e-Insaf (PTI) in the 2024 Pakistani general election. He received 217,613 votes while runner up Obaidullah Shadikhel of Pakistan Muslim League (N) (PML(N)) received 34,573 votes.
