= Amanat Ullah Khan Shadi Khel =

Pakistani politician

Member of the Provincial Assembly of the Punjab
- In office 29 May 2013 – 31 May 2018

Personal details
- Born: 21 October 1968 (age 58) Mianwali
- Party: PMLN (2013-present)

Punjab Assembly Lahore

Amanat Ullah Khan Shadi Khel is a Pakistani politician who was a Member of the Provincial Assembly of the Punjab, from 2002 to 2007 and again from May 2013 to May 2018.

== Early life and education ==
He was born on 21 October 1968 in Mianwali.

He graduated in 1988 from Bahauddin Zakariya University and has a degree of Bachelor of Arts.

== Political career ==
He was elected to the Provincial Assembly of the Punjab as a candidate of Pakistan Muslim League (Q) (PML-Q) from Constituency PP-43 (Mianwali-I) in the 2002 Pakistani general election. He received 29,379 votes and defeated Muhammad Wajih-Ud-Din, a candidate of Pakistan Tehreek-e-Insaf (PTI).

He ran for the seat of the National Assembly of Pakistan as an independent candidate from Constituency NA-71 (Mianwali-I) in the 2008 Pakistani general election but was unsuccessful. He received 73,019 votes and lost the seat to Nawabzada Malik Amad Khan. In the same election, he also ran for the seat of the Provincial Assembly of the Punjab as an independent candidate from Constituency PP-43 (Mianwali-I) but was unsuccessful. He received 37,419 votes and lost the seat to Abdul Hafeez Khan, an independent candidate.

He was re-elected to the Provincial Assembly of the Punjab as a candidate of Pakistan Muslim League (N) (PML-N) from Constituency PP-43 (Mianwali-I) in the 2013 Pakistani general election. He received 37,100 votes and defeated an independent candidate, Abdul Rehman Khan. In November 2016, he was inducted into the provincial Punjab cabinet of Chief Minister Shehbaz Sharif and was made Provincial Minister of Punjab for Irrigation.
