= Muzafarpur Janubi =

Muzaffarpur Janubi مُظفّرپُورجنُوبى
- Village and union council
- Country: Pakistan
- Region: Punjab
- District: Mianwali District
- Time zone: UTC+5 (PST)

Muzaffarpur Janubi (Urdu: مُظفّرپُورجنُوبى), is a village of Mianwali District in the Punjab province of Pakistan. The village serves as a Union Council (an administrative subdivision) of Mianwali Tehsil. The old name of this Village was Choor Wala, The Government Of Pakistan changed the name of this village From Choor Wala to Muzaffarpur (meaning village of Muzaffar) in the honor of khan Bahadar Malik Muzafar Khan Bhachar Ex MLA.

Muzaffarpur is an important UC of Mianwali and is located 22 km from Mianwali. Its population is 25,000. Malik Azeem Kundi is the nazim of Muzafarpur. The village has a high school for boys and an elementary school for girls. The Inhabitants of this village are mostly zamindars consisting of the Bhachar Bandial clan.

Among the notable educated figures of Muzaffarpur Janubi is Prof. Dr. Farooq Abdullah who has PhD degree in English Literature from UoH and Dartmouth, USA and is a fluent public speaker. His researches have been published in international research journals
