= Shahbaz Khel =

Village in Punjab, Pakistan

- Location within Pakistan
- Coordinates: 32.36°N 71.31°E
- Country: Pakistan
- Province: Punjab
- Elevation: 202 m (663 ft)
- Time zone: UTC+5 (PST)

Shahbaz Khel is a village of Mianwali District, in the northern part of the Punjab Province, Pakistan. It is located at 32°36'36N 71°31'40E with an altitude of 890 meters , and is situated in the north-west of the district, Mianwali.

It is the main village of the Union council of Mianwali.
