= Sultan Khel =

Coordinates: 32°50′20″N 71°12′20″E

- Village and union council
- Interactive map of Sultan Khel
- Country: Pakistan
- Region: Punjab
- District: Mianwali District
- Time zone: UTC+5 (PST)

Sultan Khel is a village and union council of Mianwali District in the Punjab province of Pakistan. It is located in Isakhel Tehsil.
