= Ban Hafiz Jee =

- Village and union council
- Country: Pakistan
- Region: Punjab
- District: Mianwali District
- Time zone: UTC+5 (PST)

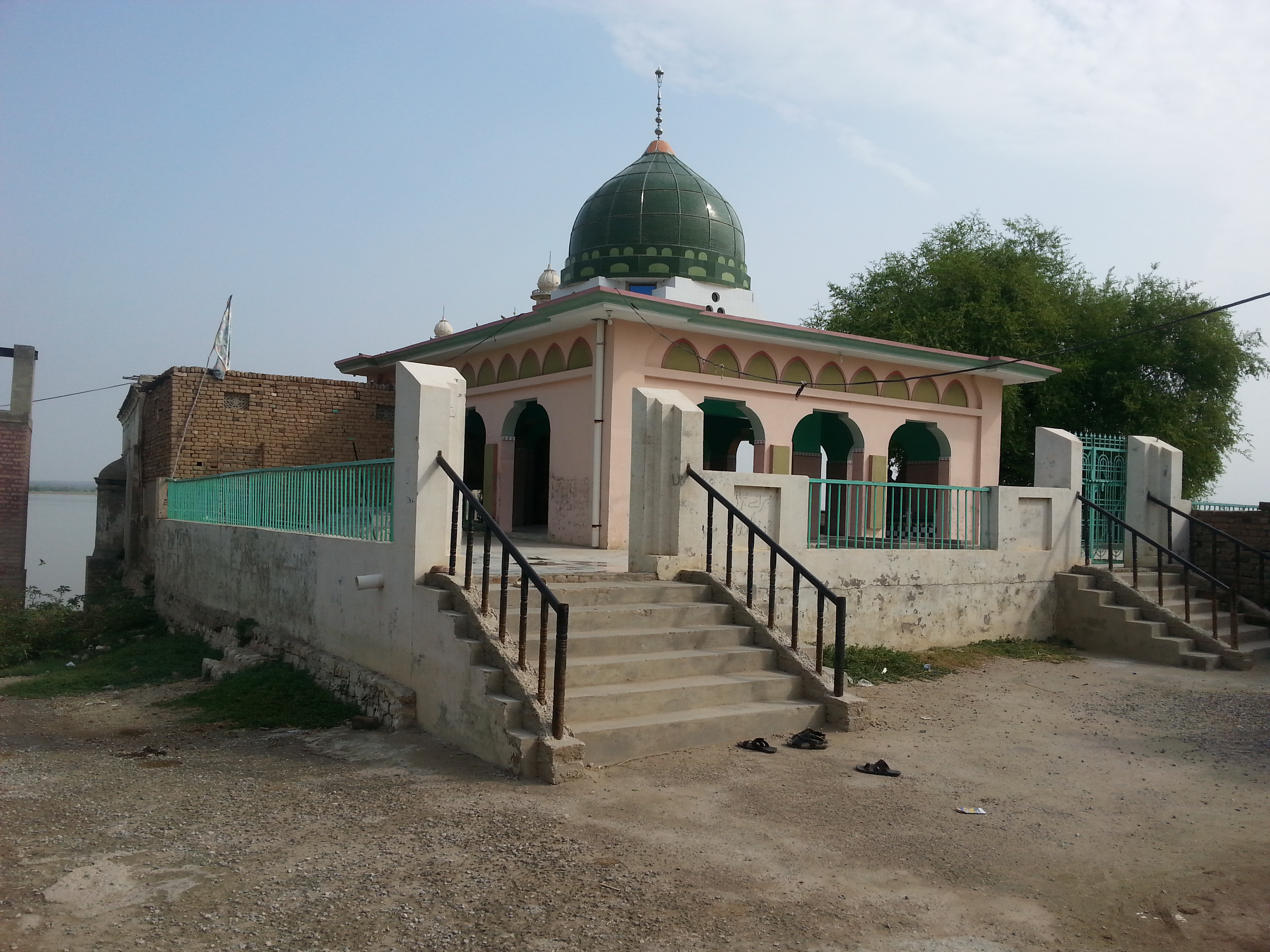
Tomb of the Saint after whom the village is named

Ban Hafiz Jee is a village and union council of Mianwali District in the Punjab province of Pakistan and is located in Mianwali Tehsil.
