= Muzafarpur Shumali =

Muzaffarpur Shumali مُظفّرپُورشُمالى
- Village and union council
- Country: Pakistan
- Region: Punjab
- District: Mianwali District

Government
  - Chairmen: Malik Miran Bakhash Bhachar

Population
  - Total: 25,000
- Time zone: UTC+5 (PST)

Muzaffarpur Shumali (Urdu: مُظفّرپُورشُمالى) is a village of Mianwali District in the Punjab province of Pakistan. The village serves as a Union Council (an administrative subdivision) of Mianwali Tehsil. The Union Council is after Khan Bahadar Malik Muzzafar Bandial, former MLA. The village's inhabitants are mostly landowners engaged in agriculture, consisting of the Bhachar clan.
