= Aqeela Asifi =

Afghan woman teacher

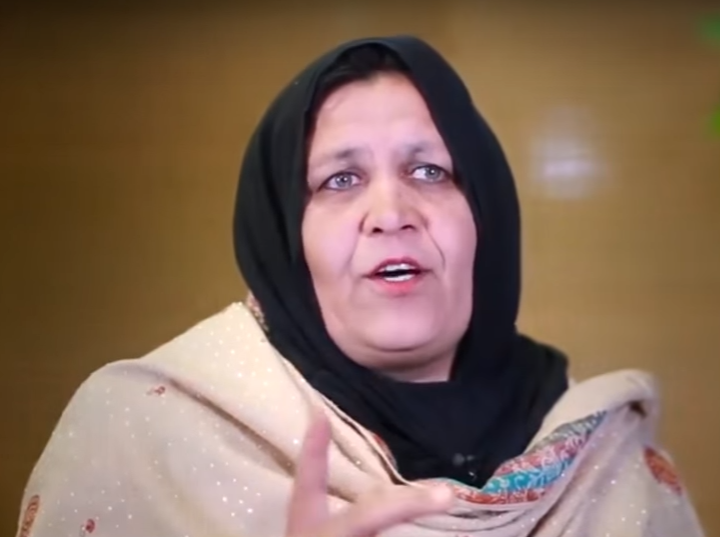
- Born: 1966; Kingdom of Afghanistan
- Occupation: Teacher
- Known for: educating thousands of refugee children in Pakistan
- Notable work: Starting the Community Girls Model School No 2 in Kot Chandna
- Awards: Nansen Refugee Award

Aqeela Asifi is an Afghan woman teacher who has educated thousands of refugee children in Mianwali, Pakistan.

== Education ==
Asifi trained in Afghanistan as a teacher of history and geography.

== Career ==
Asifi was forced to leave Afghanistan after the fall of Kabul to warlords and dissolution of the Republic of Afghanistan in 1992. When she arrived as a refugee at the Kot Chandna camp in Mianwali, there were no schools for refugee children. Asifi set up a school in a borrowed tent. As of 2017, there are nine schools in the camp with over 1,500 students. Several of these schools are also attended by Afghan refugee girls.

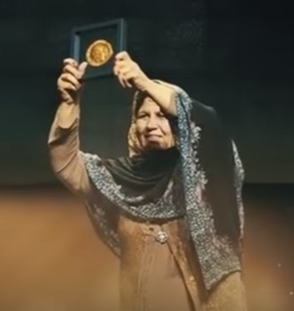
Asifi accepting the Nansen award in 2015

In 2015, Asifi was awarded the Nansen Refugee Award for her efforts in providing Afghan refugee children with an education. She has used most of her US$100,000 Nansen prize money to build a new school. The Award honours extraordinary service to refugees.

In 2017, the Community Girls Model School No 2 in Kot Chandna, started by Asifi, was recognised by the Department of Education as a higher-secondary school. It is now the first refugee school in the Punjab to be affiliated with a Board of Education.

Over a period of 23 years, Asifi has taught more than 1,000 girls. In 2020 another 1,500 refugee boys and girls were enrolled in six schools.
