= Chakrala =

Coordinates: 32.82984°N 71.87512°E

- Village
- Interactive map of Chakrala
- Country: Pakistan
- Province: Punjab
- District: Mianwali
- Tehsil: Mianwali
- Time zone: UTC+5 (PST)

Chakrala (Urdu: چكڑالا) is a village in Mianwali District in the Punjab province of Pakistan. Chakrala is also a Union Council, (administrative subdivision) of Mianwali Tehsil. Chakrala is the oldest and the largest village a seat of Hindu Tribe Chikar, of Mianwali District in the Punjab province of Pakistan. It was captured by Muslims invaders from the north-western tribes in the 13th century. Chakrala is located 10 miles (16 km) from Mianwali-Talagang Road at 32°6'0N 72°22'0E]. The area has been predominantly inhabited by Awan tribes for the last six centuries. During 13th century, Sadar Karabogha Khan, head of Khattaks along with Niazi and Awan tribes, conquered the areas at the west bank of the river Indus. The Arain had their first settlements in the Kohat and Mianwali areas. Later during 16th century these advanced towards eastern side of Indus river including Attock, Chakwal, Shah pur and Sargodha and many Awan clan shifted to new settlement. Chakrala is the birthplace of lance naik Sher Shah Awan, a Victoria Cross recipient. Chakrala village is part of Awankari Region. Awankari is an exclusive area of the Awan tribe between Mianwali, Attack, Chakwal, Khushab and Jhelum Districts. Awankari is also dialect of Awan tribe of Awankari Region.

== Notable residents ==
- Sher Shah Awan (1917–1945), British Indian Army soldier and recipient of Victoria Cross

== Location ==
Chakrala is located at 32°49' N, 71°52' E.
