= Gulmiri =

Coordinates: 32°30′0″N 71°36′0″E

Gulmiri گُلمِيرى
- Town and union council
- Interactive map of Gulmiri گُلمِيرى
- Country: Pakistan
- Region: Mianwali
- District: Mianwali District

Government
- Time zone: UTC+5 (PST)

Gulmiri (Urdu: گُلمِيرى) is a town and union council of Mianwali District, Punjab, Pakistan. Gulmiri is located at 32°30'0N 71°35'60E at an altitude of 200 m (659 ft).
