= Khaglan Wala =

Coordinates: 32°38′0″N 71°16′0″E

- Village and union council
- Interactive map of Khaglan Wala
- Country: Pakistan
- Region: Punjab
- District: Mianwali District
- Tehsil: Isakhel
- Time zone: UTC+5 (PST)

Khaglan Wala (ڪھگلانواله) is a village and union council of Isakhel Tehsil of Mianwali District in the Punjab province of Pakistan. It is part of Isakhel Tehsil and is located at 32°37'60N 71°16'0E. It is on the northern bank of Kurram River, on the western border of Punjab province adjacent to the Khyber Pakhtunkhwa province. The population is about 3,000.

The village became a Union Council in 1960s.
