= Obaidullah Shadikhel =

Pakistani politician

- عبیداللہ شادی خیل

Interior Minister of Pakistan
- In office 2 December 1971 – 19 June 1998
- Constituency: NA-71 (Mianwali-I)

Member of the National Assembly of Pakistan
- In office 2 December 1971 – 10 August 2023
- Constituency: NA-53 (Mianwali-I)

Chief Minister of Punjab
- In office 1978–1980

Personal details
- Party: PMLN (2013-present)
- Other political affiliations: PML(Q) (2002-2013)

Obaidullah Khan Shadikhel (Urdu: عبیداللہ خان شادی خیل) is a Pakistani politician who had been a member of the National Assembly of Pakistan from 1993 to 1996 and again from August 2013 to May 2018.

== Political career ==
He was elected to the National Assembly in 1993 Pakistani General Elections as an independent candidate.

He ran for the seat of the National Assembly of Pakistan as a candidate of Pakistan Muslim League (Q) (PML-Q) from Constituency NA-71 (Mianwali-I) in the 2002 Pakistani general election, but was unsuccessful. He received 60,533 votes and lost the seat to Imran Khan.

He was elected to the National Assembly as a candidate of Pakistan Muslim League (N) (PML-N) from Constituency NA-71 (Mianwali-I) in by-election held in August 2013. He received 69,799 votes and defeated a candidate of Pakistan Tehreek-e-Insaf. The seat became vacant after Imran Khan who won it in 2013 general election vacated it in order to retain the National Assembly seat he won in Constituency NA-56 (Rawalpindi-VII).

He ran for the seat of the National Assembly of Pakistan as a candidate of Pakistan Muslim League (N) (PML-N) from Constituency NA-95 (Mianwali-I) in the 2018 Pakistani general election, but was unsuccessful. He received only 50,015 votes and lost the seat to Chairman PTI Imran Khan received 163,538 votes, with very heavy margin of 113,523 votes.

He ran for the seat of the National Assembly of Pakistan as a candidate of Pakistan Muslim League (N) (PML-N) from Constituency NA-89 (Mianwali-I) in the 2024 Pakistani general election, but was unsuccessful. He received only 34,573 votes and lost the seat to Imran Khan's Candidate Jamal Ahsan Khan Isakhel received 217,613 votes, with very heavy margin of 183,040 votes.

== See also ==
- Imran Khan
- NA-89 Mianwali-I
