= Nakkah Afghan =

Coordinates: 33°09′52″N 71°50′03″E

Nakka Afghan
- Townlet
- نکہ افغان
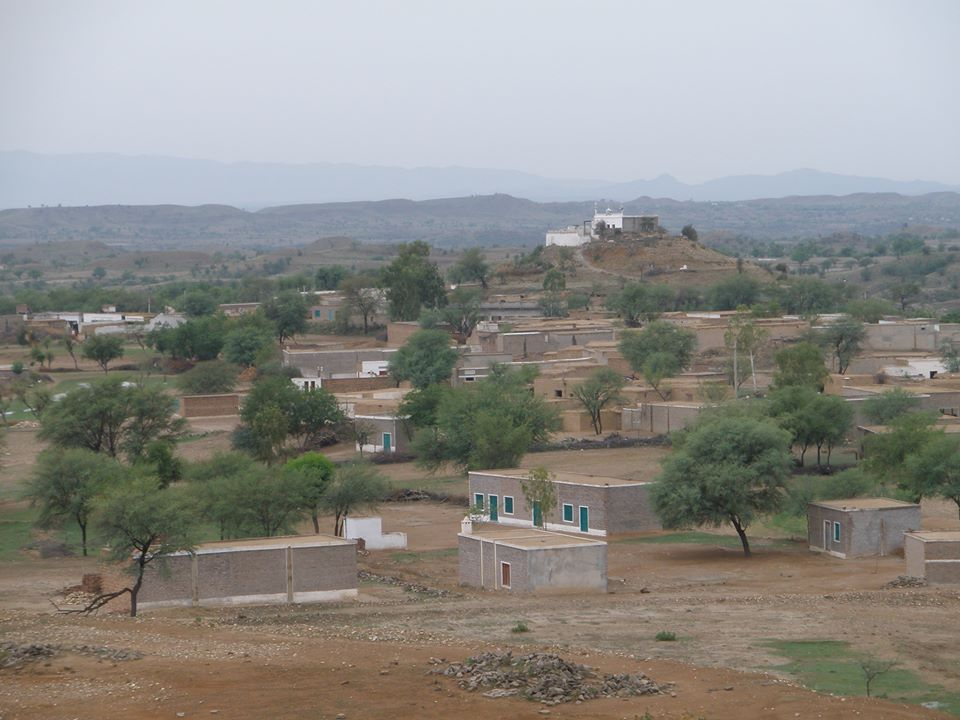
- Time zone: UTC +5

Nakka Afghan (Hindko, Urdu: نکہ افغان) is a village situated in Jand Tehsil of Attock District in Punjab Province of Pakistan.

== Geography ==
It is located near Makhad along the bank of Indus River.

== Climate ==
Nakka Afghan is situated in Potohar Plateau of Pakistan. In summer the weather gets very hot and in the winter temperature gets very cold.
