= Amir Mohammad Khan =

Pakistani politician

Amir Muhammad Khan نواب ملك امیر مُحمد خان اعوان Nawab of Kalabagh
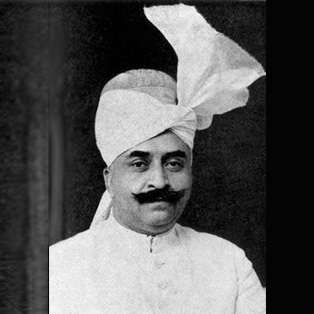

3rd Governor of West Pakistan
- In office 12 April 1960 – 18 September 1966
- President: Muhammad Ayub Khan
- Preceded by: Akhter Husain
- Succeeded by: General Musa

Personal details
- Born: 20 June 1910 Kalabagh, Punjab, British India
- Died: 26 November 1967 (aged 57) Kalabagh, Punjab, Pakistan
- Relatives: Malik Muzaffar Khan (son); Malik Amad Khan (grand son); Sumaira Malik (grand daughter); Ayla Malik (grand daughter)
- House: Nawab of Kalabagh

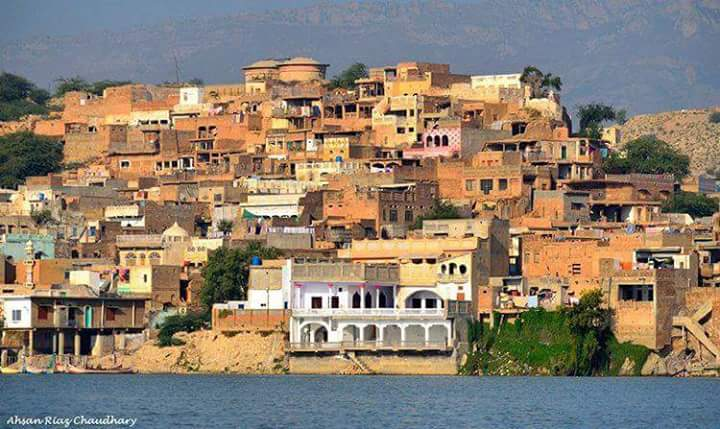
Kalabagh Estate

Nawab of Kalabagh Malik Amir Mohammad Khan (نواب کالا باغ; 20 June 1910 – 26 November 1967) was the hereditary ruler of Kalabagh Estate and a prominent feudal lord, politician of Pakistan. He was also the Chief or Sardar of the Awan tribe. Nawab of Kalabagh has been a ruling title for tribal estate of Kalabagh, in Mianwali District of north western Punjab, Pakistan.

== Early life ==
Malik Amir Mohammad Khan received his college education at Aitchison College, Lahore and then went on to finish his education at Oxford University in England.

== Career ==
Malik Amir Mohammad Khan served as a member of the Provincial Assembly of Punjab from 1956 – 1958. He also served as Governor of West Pakistan from 1960 to 1966. He was appointed chairman Pakistan Industrial Development Corporation with the rank of a Federal Minister in 1959, and subsequently Governor of West Pakistan on 12 April 1960 by Pakistan President General Ayub Khan.

His role during the Indo-Pakistan War of 1965 is praised, as he kept the law and order, controlled the prices, trafficked the raw material, and prevented smuggling in West Pakistan.

Among the guests to his famous Kalabagh guest house, the Bohr Bungalow, were Eleanor Roosevelt in 1952 and former Pakistani Presidents Iskander Mirza, Ayub Khan and Zulfikar Ali Bhutto.

General Jahandad Khan, who was military secretary to Nawab Malik Amir Mohammad Khan, the then governor of West Pakistan, wrote a book, Pakistan Leadership Challenges. In that book Nawab Malik Amir Mohammad Khan comes across as a sound, no-nonsense administrator, firmly wedded to the values and traditions of the feudal class. He was also considered "brutal," "ruthless" and "harsh" in both his public and private life. British assessment of the Nawab of Kalabagh was very similar. In his book Jahandad, Nawab Malik Amir Mohammad Khan's military secretary dismisses alleged rumours about a somewhat sinister aspect of the Gen Ayub regime.

In 1963, the regime faced strong opposition from the political party Jamaat-i-Islami. Ayub himself "felt gravely threatened by its head, Maudoodi." "Some sycophants" sought to persuade Ayub that "the physical elimination" of Maulana would bring peace to the country and that Malik Amir Mohammad Khan would help execute this attempt. Khan dismisses this as a baseless rumour in his above book.

== Death ==
It was widely reported in Pakistani news media that his third youngest son Malik Asad Khan killed him over a family property dispute on 26 November 1967.

== Descendants ==
His eldest son Nawab Malik Muzaffar Khan had been a member of National Assembly from Mianwali for 3 consecutive term in 1962-1964, 1965–1969 and 1970–1977.

Nawab Malik Muzzafar Khan had three sons: the eldest Malik Idrees Khan, the second Malik Fareed khan and the youngest Malik Waheed Khan. Following his death, his eldest nephew, Malik Amir Muhammad Khan, succeeded him as the Nawab of Kalabagh, a title he continues to hold to the present day.

Nawab Malik Amir Muhammad Khan's second son Malik Allahyar also remained a member of Majlis-e-Shoora during General Zia-ul-Haq's military regime from 1981 to 1985. Malik Allahyar's daughters, Sumaira Malik and Ayla Malik, both were members of the National Assembly of Pakistan from 2002 until 2013.

Amir Mohammad Khan's third son was Malik Asad Khan. Malik Asad's son Malik Amad Khan, won the National Assembly of Pakistan seat from NA-71 Mianwali-I in the February 2008 elections as an independent candidate. He also served as state minister of Foreign Affairs Pakistan from 2008 to 2013.

Nawab Malik Amir Mohammad Khan's fourth and youngest son Malik Azam Khan passed away in 1995. Malik Azam died without issue.

== See also ==
- Kalabagh Dam

Political offices
Preceded by Akhter Husain	Governor of West Pakistan; 1960–1966	Succeeded by General Muhammad Musa
