= Kamar Mushani =

Coordinates: 32°50′38″N 71°22′1″E

Kamar Mushani كمرمشانى
- Town and union council
- Interactive map of Kamar Mushani كمرمشانى
- Country: Pakistan
- Region: Punjab
- District: Mianwali District

Population (2023)
  - Total: 39,013
- Time zone: UTC+5 (PST)

Kamar Mushani (Punjabi: كمرمشانى) is a town with four union councils, an administrative subdivision, of Mianwali District in the Punjab province of Pakistan. It is part of Isakhel Tehsil.
