= Ayla Malik =

Pakistani politician and journalist (born 1970)

- عائلہ ملک

Member of the National Assembly
- In office October 2002 – May 2013

Personal details
- Born: 6 October 1970 (age 56) Mianwali, Punjab, Pakistan
- Other political affiliations: Pakistan Tehreek-e-Insaf
- Children: 2
- Relatives: Amir Mohammad Khan
- Profession: Politician; journalist

Ayla Malik (Note: Urdu: عائلہ ملک) (born 6 October 1970) is a Pakistani politician and journalist. She served as the Member of National Assembly from 2002 to 2013 on a reserved seat for women. She was a central member of Pakistan Tehreek-e-Insaf in Mianwali.

== Early life and education ==
Ayla belongs to a political family. Ayla is one of the granddaughters of Malik Amir Mohammad Khan of Kalabagh, who had been the governor of West Pakistan. She is the sister of politician Sumaira Malik. She is also the niece (Note: sister's daughter) of former Pakistan president Sardar Farooq Ahmed Khan Leghari.

The Board of Intermediate and Secondary Education (BISE), Rawalpindi, had declared her intermediate certificate 'bogus' on 20 July 2013 that carries the roll number of a male candidate named Imdad Hussain, who too had failed.

== Political career ==
Malik started her political career by joining the Millat Party of Farooq Leghari in 1998. She served as Deputy Secretary General of Millat Party and was an MNA from the platform of the National Alliance (Pakistan) from 2002 to 2007. Ayla Malik joined PTI in 2011 and since is the central member of Pakistan Tehreek-e-Insaf, she was on the priority list of the party for a reserved seat in the National Assembly but the party failed to win enough seats to nominate her to the parliament. PTI Chairman Imran Khan decided to field Ayla in his hometown seat in Mianwali in the by elections, after he decided to keep Rawalpindi seat, as she had been the campaign manager of the party in the district in which PTI won every single seat. On 10 May 2013 Ayla Malik were injured after unidentified persons opened firing on her convoy in Mianwali.

== Disqualification ==
On 30 July 2013, Ayla Malik was disqualified by a two-member Election Tribunal (ET) of Lahore High Court (LHC) Rawalpindi Bench over submitting her fake intermediate degree before the Election Commission of Pakistan (CEC). During the hearing of the petition, the ET LHC, consisting of Justice Mamoon Rasheed and Justice Ayesha A Malik, laid down its verdict declaring Ayla Malik ineligible for contesting the bye-polls.

== Media experience ==
Malik anchored a Current Affairs program called Situation Room with Ayla Malik on Dunya News.
