= Sher Shah Awan =

Crawled at the enemy despite shattered leg

Sher Shah Awan ( Sher Shah)
- Born: 14 February 1917; Chakrala, Punjab, British India
- Died: 20 January 1945 (aged 27) near the Kaladan River, British Burma
- Military career
- Allegiance: British India
- Branch: British Indian Army
- Rank: Lance Naik
- Units: 7th Battalion, 16th Punjab Regiment
- Conflicts: World War II; Pacific War; Burma campaign; Burma campaign (1944–1945) †
- Awards: Victoria Cross

Sher Shah Awan VC (14 February 1917 – 20 January 1945) was a British Indian Army soldier who received the Victoria Cross, the highest and most prestigious award for gallantry in the face of the enemy that can be awarded to British and Commonwealth forces.

== Military career ==
Sher Shah was an Awan Muslim and the son of Barkhurdar and his wife Makda Bibi; and husband of Mehr Bhari, from the village of Chakrala, about 30 km east from Mianwali, Punjab region that is now part of Pakistan. He was 27 years old and a lance naik in the 7th Battalion of the 16th Punjab Regiment in the Indian Army during World War II when the following deed took place for which he was awarded the VC.

On 19/20 January 1945 at Kyeyebyin, Kaladan, Burma (now Myanmar), Lance Naik Sher Shah was commanding a left forward section of his platoon when it was attacked by overwhelming numbers of Japanese. He broke up two attacks by crawling right in among the enemy and shooting at point-blank range. On the second occasion he was hit and his leg shattered, but he maintained that his injury was only slight and when the third attack came, he again crawled forward engaging the enemy until he was shot through the head and killed.

Sher Shah's Battalion 7/16 Punjab Regiment, affectionately known as "Saat Solah Punjab", is now a part of the Pakistan Army, proudly known as the "Sher Shah Battalion".

== See also ==
- Monuments to Courage (David Harvey, 1999)
- The Register of the Victoria Cross (This England, 1997)
