= Malik Muzaffar Khan =

Pakistani politician

Malik Muzaffar Khan Nawab of Kalabagh

Member of the National Assembly of Pakistan
- In office 1970–1977
- Constituency: NW-44 (Mianwali-I)
- In office 1965–1969
- Constituency: NW-36 (Mianwali-I)
- In office 1962–1964
- Constituency: NW-37 (Mianwali)

Malik Muzaffar Khan was a Pakistani politician and Nawab of Kalabagh. He was eldest son of Amir Mohammad Khan. He was member of the 5th National Assembly of Pakistan NW-44 (Mianwali) from 1970 to 1977.

He was member of the 3rd National Assembly of Pakistan NW-36 (Mianwali-I) from 1962 to 1964.

He was again member of the 4th National Assembly of Pakistan NW-37 (Mianwali) from 1965 to 1969.

He was elected for third consecutive term as member of the 5th National Assembly of Pakistan NW-44 (Mianwali) from 1970 to 1977.

== See also ==
- Kalabagh Dam
