= Isakhel Tehsil =

Isakhel Tehsil تحصِيل عِيسىٰ خيل
- Tehsil
- Country: Pakistan
- Region: Punjab
- District: Mianwali District
- Capital: Isakhel
- Towns: 3
- Union councils: 13

Area
  - Tehsil: 1,863 km^{2} (719 sq mi)

Population (2023)
  - Tehsil: 414,100
  - Density: 222.3/km^{2} (575.7/sq mi)
  - Urban: 94,541 (22.83%)
  - Rural: 319,559 (77.17%)
- Time zone: UTC+5 (PST)

Isakhel Tehsil (Urdu: تحصِيل عِيسىٰ خيل) is an administrative subdivision (tehsil) of Mianwali District in the Punjab province of Pakistan. The city of Isakhel is the headquarters of the tehsil which is administratively subdivided into 3 Municipal Committees and 13 Union Councils. It is located between 32° 30′ and 33° 14′ N. and 71° 7′ and 71° 44′ E., with an area of 678 square miles (1,760 km^{2}) and contains the towns of Isakhel, Kammar Mushani and Kalabagh

== Administration ==
The tehsil of Isakhel is administratively subdivided into 3 Municipal Committees

- MC Isakhel
- Qamar Abad Sharif
- MC Kamar Mushani
- MC Kala Bagh

and 13 Union Councils, these are:

- Chapri
- Khaglan Wala
- Kaloaan Wala
- Kallur Shareef
- Kamar Mushani Pakka
- Kot Chandna
- Manda Khel
- Sultan Khel
- Tabisar
- Tanikhel
- Tola Bhangi Khel
- Trag
- Vanjari

== History ==
During British rule Isakhel became part of Mianwali District when the North-West Frontier Province was created in 1901.

According to the 1901 census, it contained the municipalities of Isakhel (population, 7,630), the headquarters, and Kalabagh (5,824); and 43 villages. The land revenue and cesses in 1903-4 amounted to 1.6 lakhs. Lying on the west bank of the Indus, this tehsil is cut off from the rest of the District, and would seem to belong more properly to the North-West Frontier Province, but is separated even more completely from Bannu by the semicircular fringe of the Chichali and Maidani hills, which leave it open only on the river side. These hills drain into Isakhel and make it fertile. Its extreme northern portion, known as the Bhangi Khel country, is a wild and rugged region, a continuation of the Khattak hills.

The tehsil derives its name from the Isa Khel tribe, sub-tribe of the Niazi Afghans, who, settling here during the sixteenth century, long maintained their independence of the Mughal empire, and at last succumbed to the Nawab of Dera Ismail Khan.

== Demography ==
The total population as of the 1998 census was 256,000. The main first languages are Punjabi (40%), Pashto (35%) and Saraiki (23%).
