= Daud Khel =

DAUD KHEL (Urdu: داؤدخیل)
- Village and union council
- Location in Pakistan
- Coordinates: 32.52°N 71.34°E
- Country: Pakistan
- Region: Punjab
- District: Mianwali District
- Elevation: 207 m (679 ft)
- Time zone: UTC+5 (PST)
- Postal code: 42330

Daud Khel (Urdu: داؤدخیل) is a town of Mianwali District, Punjab, Pakistan.

== Location ==
The town is located at 32°52'60N 71°34'0E at an altitude of 207 meters, 35 kilometers from District Mianwali from its north side. Its nearest city is Kalabagh.

== Population ==
The town's population is approximately 1 lakh. Some 70% of the population lives in urban areas while 30% lives in suburban villages. What is special about this city is that there are 60% more males than females. The population lives in the Mohallahs. These include Mohalla shrif khel oner of the 80/property in Daud khel other. Mohalla Salar, Mohalla Amirekhel, Mohalla Janoobi Wandhi, Mohalla New Wandhi, Mohalla Bahram Khel, Mohalla Shakur Khel, Mohalla Daukhel, Mohalla Lamekhel, Mohalla Alawal Khel, Mohalla Ghazni Khel, Mohalla Samal Khel, Mohalla and Mohalla Hussainabad.
