= Kalabagh =

Kalabagh کالا باغ
- City
- Location of Kalabagh Kalabagh (Pakistan)
- Coordinates: 32.966°N 71.553°E
- Country: Pakistan
- Province: Punjab
- District: Mianwali District
- Tehsil: Isakhel Tehsil
- Seat: PTI
- Union Councils: 25

Government
- Time zone: UTC+5 (PST)
- Postal code: 04529
- Area code: 0459

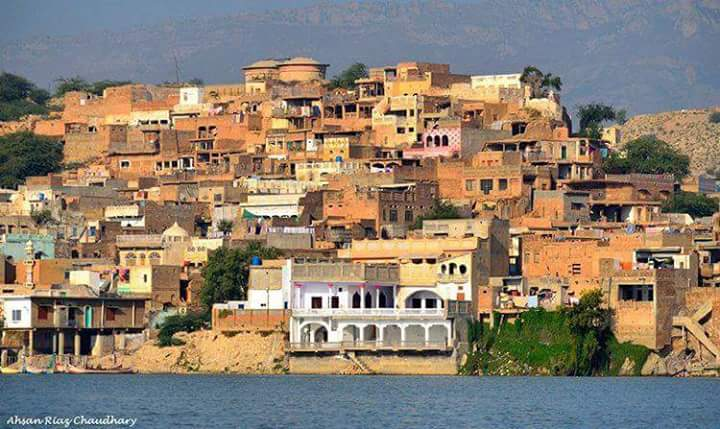
Kalabagh town

Kalabagh (Urdu: کالا باغ) is a town of Mianwali District in the Punjab province of Pakistan. and part of Isakhel Tehsil. It is located on the western bank of the Indus River. It is the seat of the Nawab of Kalabagh, who lives in the fort known locally as Qila Nawab Sahib. Kalabagh is known for its red hills of the Salt Range and the scenic view of the Indus traversing through the hills. It also produces handicrafts, especially footwear and Makhadi Halwa.

== Etymology ==
Kala means "black", and Bagh means "garden". This name came about because its founders, the nawabs of Kalabagh, planted a lot of mango trees, and their dark green leaves looked black to travellers from afar in the dusty haze. Hence kalabagh simply means "black garden". This local town has geological importance for Pakistan.

== See also ==
- Nawab Malik Amir Mohammad Khan
- Kalabagh Dam
- Kalabagh railway station
- Kalabagh Dam
