= Mianwali District =

District in Punjab, Pakistan

Coordinates: 32°00′N 71°30′E

Mianwali ضِلع مِيانوالى
- District of Punjab
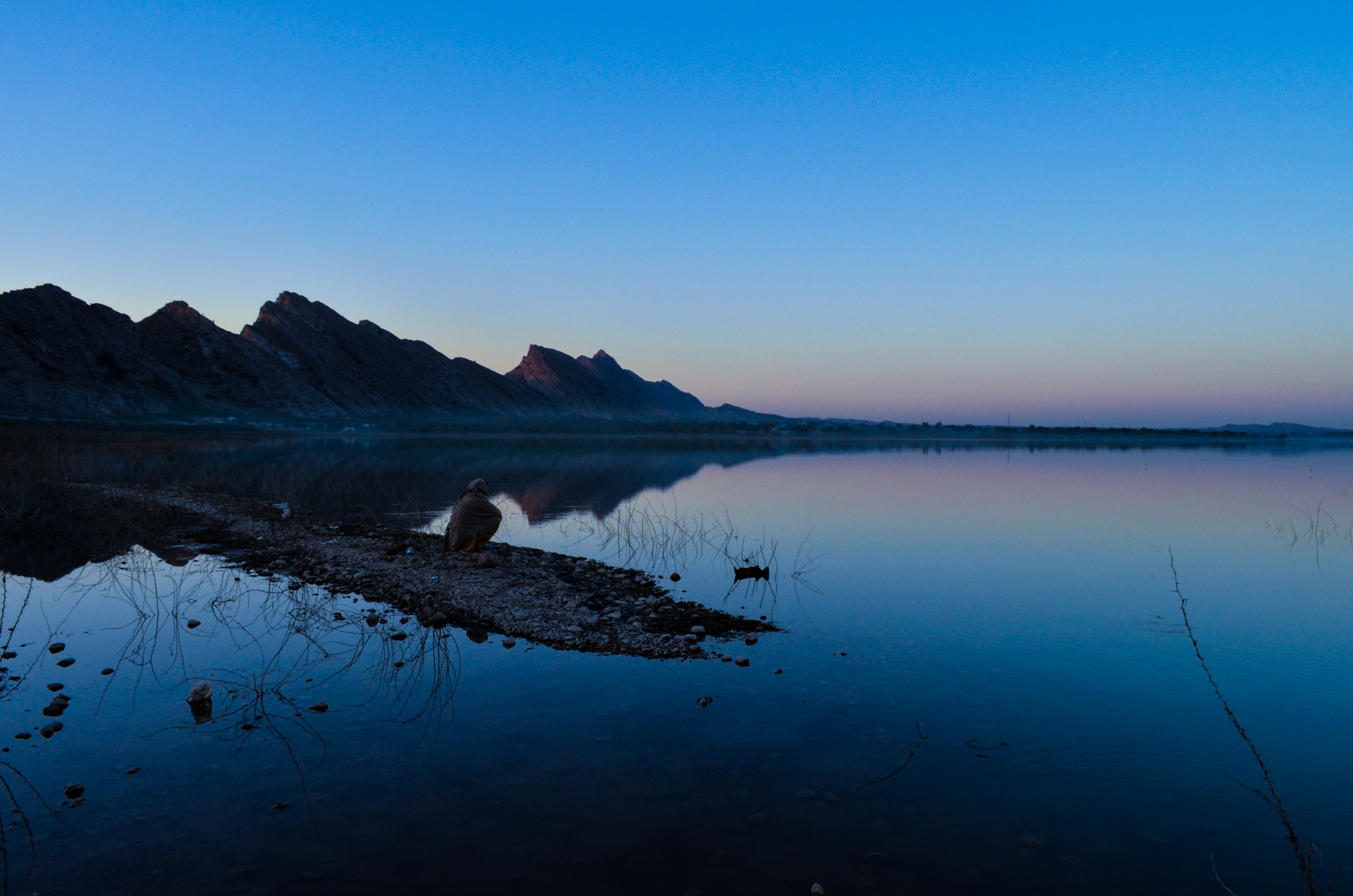
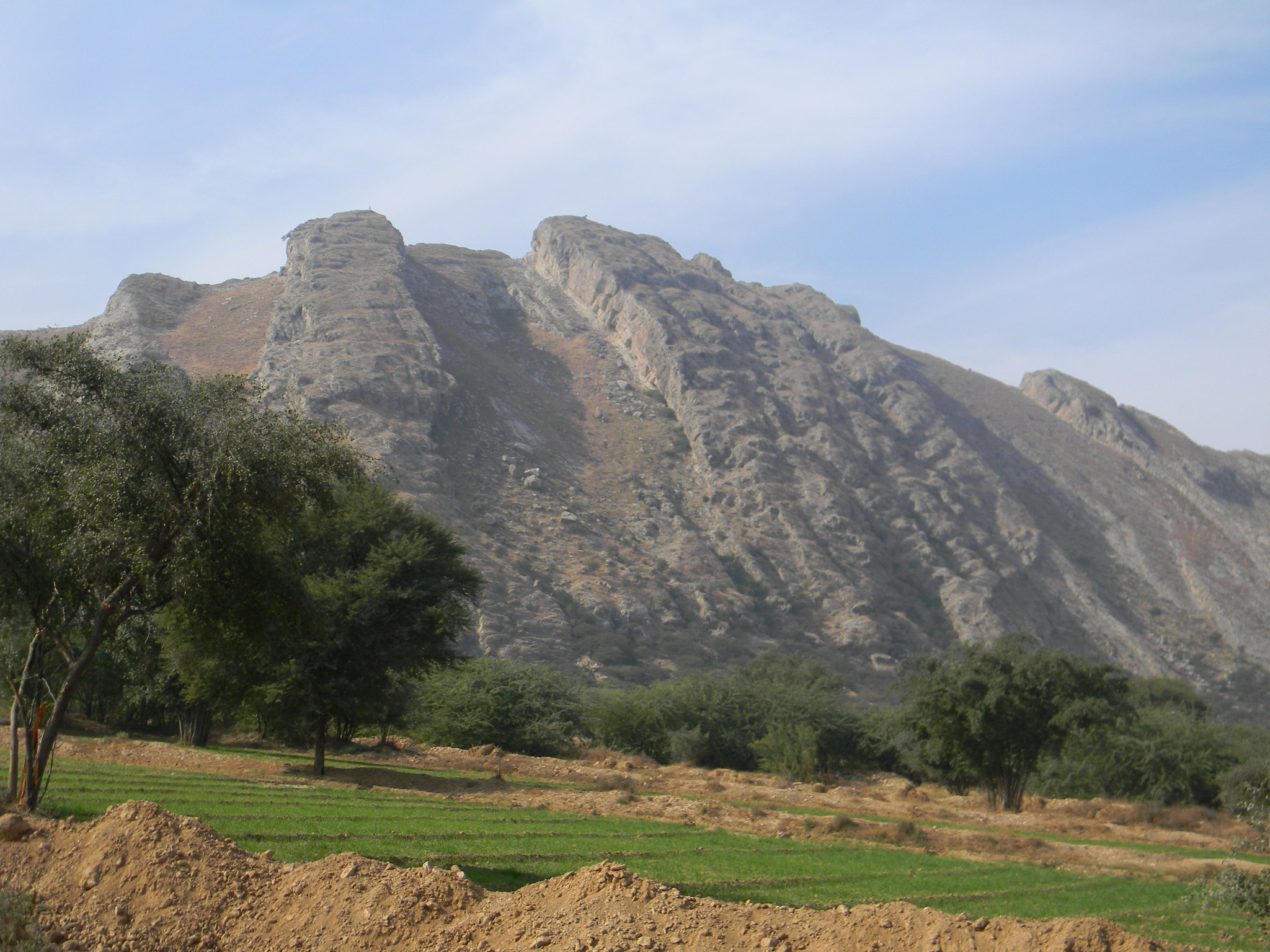
- Top: Namal Lake; Bottom: Salt Range

- Flag Seal

- Mianwali District highlighted within Punjab Province
- Country: Pakistan
- Province: (Punjab, Pakistan) Punjab
- Division: Sargodha
- Established: November 1901; 125 years ago
- Founder: British Raj
- Headquarters: Mianwali
- Number of Tehsil: 3: Isakhel Mianwali Piplan

Government
  - Type: District Administration
  - Deputy Commissioner: Asad Abbas
  - District Police Officer: Rai Muhammed Ajmal
  - Constituency: NA-89 Mianwali-I; NA-90 Mianwali-II
  - CNIC Code Mianwali District: 383XX-XXXXXXX-X

Area
  - District of Punjab: 5,900 km^{2} (2,300 sq mi)
- Elevation: 210 m (690 ft)

Population (2023)
  - District of Punjab: 1,795,897
  - Density: 300/km^{2} (790/sq mi)
  - Urban: 363,453 (20.21%)
  - Rural: 1,434,815 (79.79%)

Literacy
  - Literacy rate: Total: (62.87%); Male: (77.58%); Female: (47.63%)
- Time zone: UTC+05:00 (PKT)
  - Summer (DST): DST is not observed
- Postal Code: 42200
- NWD (area) code: 0459
- ISO 3166 code: PK-PB
- Website: mianwali.punjab.gov.pk

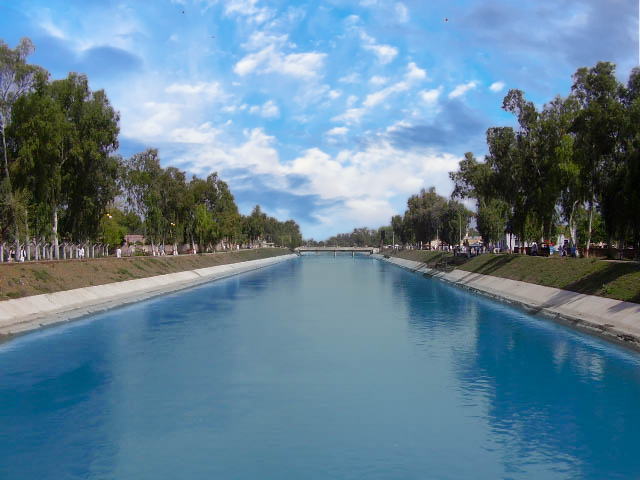
Thal Canal

Mianwali District (Note: Punjabi: ضِلع مِيانوالى) is a district located in the Sargodha Division of the Punjab province of Pakistan. Mianwali District remained part of Rawalpindi Division until 1963, when Mianwali District became part of Sargodha Division. According to 2023 Pakistani census, population of Mianwali District is 1.79 million.

It has borders with the Talagang, Attock, Kohat, Karak, Lakki Marwat, Dera Ismail Khan, Bhakkar, and Khushab districts.

== History ==
The town of Mianwali was made tehsil headquarters of Bannu District then part of Dera Ismail Khan Division of Punjab province of British India. The population of Mianwali, according to the 1901 census of India, was 3,591.

In November 1901, the North-West Frontier Province was carved out of Punjab and the tehsils of Mianwali and Isa Khel, and were separated from Bannu District (Bannu became part of NWFP). A new district was made with the headquarters in Mianwali city and placed in Punjab. The district became a part of Rawalpindi Division. There were four tehsils: Mianwali, Isa Khel, Bhakkar, and Layyah. Layyah was included in the Muzaffargarh District in 1909. The district became a part of Sargodha Division in 1963. Bhakkar Tehsil was separated from Mianwali and was made a separate district inside Sargodha Division w.e.f. 01-07-1982. Out of the three tehsils, Pashto is spoken in Isa Khel.

On January 14, 2023, CM Pervaiz Elahi announced that Mianwali and Bhakkar districts upgraded to divisional status, carved from the Sargodha Division. Newly formed Talagang district from the northern Rawalpindi Division would also be part of the division.

== Geography ==
Mianwali district covers an area of 5,840 square kilometres (2,250 sq mi). The area in the north is a continuation of the Pothohar Plateau and the Kohistan-e-Namak. Southern side of the district is a part of Thal desert. Indus River flows through the district.

=== Climate ===
Mianwali district has an extreme climate with a long hot summer season and dry cold winters. Summer lasts from May to September and winter lasts from November till February. June is the hottest month with average temperature of 42 °C (highest recorded temperature was 52 °C); in winter, the average temperature can be as low as 3 to 4 °C, particularly in December and January. The average rainfall in the district is about 385 mm.

Month	Jan	Feb	Mar	Apr	May	Jun	Jul	Aug	Sep	Oct	Nov	Dec	Year
Average High Temperatures °C (°F)	19° (66.2 °)	21° (69.8 °)	26° (78.8 °)	33° (91.4 °)	38° (100.4 °)	42° (107.6 °)	39° (102.2 °)	37° (98.6 °)	37° (98.6 °)	33° (91.6 °)	28° (82.4 °)	21° (69.8 °)	31° (87.8 °)
Average Low Temperatures °C	3	6	12	17	22	27	27	26	23	16	9	4	16
Rainfall in. (cm)	1.6	2.1	4.1	2.4	1.9	1.8	7.6	11	4.5	0.7	0.1	0.9	38.5
Source: Weatherbase

== Administration ==
The municipal committee was founded in December 1993 and has remained operational since then. The district is administratively divided into three tehsils 7 Municipal Committees and 51 union councils:

Tehsil	Area (km^{2})	Pop. (2023)	Density (ppl/km^{2}) (2023)	Literacy rate (2023)	Union Councils	Municipal Committees
Isakhel	1,863	414,100	222.28	55.02%	13	3
Mianwali	2,689	908,405	337.82	66.09%	26	2
Piplan	1,288	475,763	369.38	63.46%	12	2
Total					51	7

== Urban areas ==
Name	Area (km^{2})	Pop. (2023)	Density (ppl/km^{2}) (2023)	Literacy rate (2023)	Tehsil
Mianwali		129,500			Mianwali
Kundian		48,658			Piplan
Kamar Mashani		39,013			Isa Khel
Liaqatabad		35,297			Piplan
Daud Khel		33,141			Mianwali
Isa Khel		27,612			Isa Khel
Kalabagh		27,916			Isa Khel
Harnoli		22,316			Piplan

== Demographics ==
=== Language ===
Languages of Mianwali district (2023)
1. Saraiki (76.0%)
2. Pashto (11.3%)
3. Punjabi (7.79%)
4. Hindko dialect (0.50%)
5. Urdu (3.15%)
6. Others (0.52%)

At the time of the 2023 census, 76.67% of the population spoke Saraiki language, 11.35% Pashto, 7.79% Punjabi, 0.5% Hindko and 3.15% Urdu as their first language.

=== Population ===
Historical population
Year	Pop.	±% p.a.
1951	315,816	—
1961	413,851	+2.74%
1972	595,134	+3.36%
1981	711,529	+2.00%
1998	1,056,620	+2.35%
2017	1,542,601	+2.01%
2023	1,798,268	+2.59%

As of the 2023 census, Mianwali district has 296,339 households and a population of 1,798,268. The district has a sex ratio of 104.32 males to 100 females and a literacy rate of 62.87%: 77.58% for males and 47.63% for females. 454,517 (25.31% of the surveyed population) are under 10 years of age. 363,453 (20.21%) live in urban areas.

=== Religion ===
Religion in Mianwali district (2023)
Religion	Percent
Islam	99.32%
Christianity	0.67%
Other	0.01%

As per the 2023 census, Muslims made up almost the entire population with 99.32%, although there is a small mainly urban minority of Christians numbering 11,951.

Religion in contemporary Mianwali District
Religious group	1941		2017		2023	
Religious group	Pop.	%	Pop.	%	Pop.	%
Islam	266,984	88.91%	1,535,345	99.53%	1,783,687	99.32%
Hinduism (Note: 1931-1941: Including Ad-Dharmis)	30,084	10.02%	21	0%	63	0%
Sikhism	2,869	0.96%	—N/a	—N/a	41	0%
Christianity	302	0.1%	7,044	0.46%	11,951	0.67%
Ahmadi	—N/a	—N/a	101	0.01%	45	0%
Others	47	0.02%	90	0.01%	110	0.01%
Total Population	300,286	100%	1,542,601	100%	1,795,897	100%
Note: 1941 census data is for Mianwali and Isakhel tehsils of erstwhile Mianwali district, which roughly corresponds to contemporary Mianwali district. District and tehsil borders have changed since 1941.

Religious groups in Mianwali District (British Punjab province era)
Religious group	1901		1911		1921		1931		1941	
Religious group	Pop.	%	Pop.	%	Pop.	%	Pop.	%	Pop.	%
Islam	371,674	87.54%	299,971	87.87%	308,876	86.23%	357,109	86.77%	436,260	86.16%
Hinduism	50,202	11.82%	36,326	10.64%	45,974	12.83%	49,794	12.1%	62,814	12.41%
Sikhism	2,633	0.62%	4,881	1.43%	2,986	0.83%	4,231	1.03%	6,865	1.36%
Christianity	44	0.01%	168	0.05%	369	0.1%	380	0.09%	358	0.07%
Jainism	35	0.01%	31	0.01%	0	0%	20	0%	23	0%
Zoroastrianism	0	0%	0	0%	0	0%	5	0%	1	0%
Buddhism	0	0%	0	0%	0	0%	0	0%	0	0%
Judaism	0	0%	0	0%	0	0%	0	0%	0	0%
Others	0	0%	0	0%	0	0%	0	0%	0	0%
Total population	424,588	100%	341,377	100%	358,205	100%	411,539	100%	506,321	100%
Note: British Punjab province era district borders are not an exact match in the present-day due to various bifurcations to district borders — which since created new districts — throughout the historic Punjab Province region during the post-independence era that have taken into account population increases.

Religion in the Tehsils of Mianwali District (1921)
Tehsil	Islam		Hinduism		Sikhism		Christianity		Jainism		Others (Note: Including Buddhism, Zoroastrianism, Judaism, Tribals, others, or not stated)		Total	
Tehsil	Pop.	%	Pop.	%	Pop.	%	Pop.	%	Pop.	%	Pop.	%	Pop.	%
Mianwali Tehsil	129,004	87.43%	17,177	11.64%	1,189	0.81%	183	0.12%	0	0%	0	0%	147,553	100%
Bhakkar Tehsil	122,437	83.22%	23,262	15.81%	1,335	0.91%	87	0.06%	0	0%	0	0%	147,121	100%
Isa Khel Tehsil	57,435	90.4%	5,535	8.71%	462	0.73%	99	0.16%	0	0%	0	0%	63,531	100%
Note: British Punjab province era tehsil borders are not an exact match in the present-day due to various bifurcations to tehsil borders — which since created new tehsils — throughout the historic Punjab Province region during the post-independence era that have taken into account population increases.

Religion in the Tehsils of Mianwali District (1941)
Tehsil	Islam		Hinduism		Sikhism		Christianity		Jainism		Others (Note: Including Anglo-Indian Christians, British Christians, Buddhism, Zoroastrianism, Judaism, Tribals, others, or not stated)		Total	
Tehsil	Pop.	%	Pop.	%	Pop.	%	Pop.	%	Pop.	%	Pop.	%	Pop.	%
Mianwali Tehsil	194,442	87.42%	25,488	11.46%	2,202	0.99%	251	0.11%	0	0%	33	0.01%	222,416	100%
Bhakkar Tehsil	169,276	82.16%	32,730	15.89%	3,996	1.94%	22	0.01%	0	0%	1	0%	206,035	100%
Isa Khel Tehsil	72,542	93.16%	4,596	5.9%	667	0.86%	51	0.07%	23	0.03%	1	0%	77,870	100%
Note1: British Punjab province era tehsil borders are not an exact match in the present-day due to various bifurcations to tehsil borders — which since created new tehsils — throughout the historic Punjab Province region during the post-independence era that have taken into account population increases. Note2: Tehsil religious breakdown figures for Christianity only includes local Christians, labeled as "Indian Christians" on census. Does not include Anglo-Indian Christians or British Christians, who were classified under "Other" category.

== People ==
- Mian Sultan Zikria - Famous Sufi saint from the Mianwali districtIsakhel
- Amjad Khan Niazi - Retired Chief of Naval Staff of Pakistan Navy.
- Nawab Malik Amir Mohammad Khan - Chief of the Awan tribe, Nawab of Kalabagh, Former Governor of the West Pakistan.
- Tilok Chand Mehroom – Urdu poet
- Jagannath Azad – Urdu-Speaking poet of Hindu academic.
- Imran Khan Niazi – Former captain of the Pakistan cricket team, twice elected to the National Assembly of Pakistan from Mianwali and served as the 22nd Prime minister of Pakistan .
- Attaullah Khan Esakhelvi – Folk singer
- Abdul Sattar Khan Niazi – religious and political leader of Pakistan
- Misbah-ul-Haq – Pakistani cricketer
- Sher Afgan Niazi – Former Minister of Law and Member of Parliament
- Sardar Khan Niazi – Chief Editor and publisher of Daily Pakistan, Daily The Patriot, Daily Pak Watan, Daily Action, Daily Nawa-e-Nawabshah, Monthly Naya Rukh, and also Chairman of the Pakistan Group of Publications.
- Shadab Khan – Pakistani cricketer.
- Aqeela Asifi – Afghan refugee and teacher who has educated thousands of other Afghan refugee children in Mianwali
- Lt. Gen. Amir Abdullah Niazi - Commandent Army Eastern Command III Corps in East Pakistan
- Maj. Gen. Sanaullah Khan Niazi - Two-star Major-General rank officer of Pakistan military, GOC Malakand, who embraced martyrdom in Pakistan's War on terrorism
- Air Vice Marshal Abdul Razzaq Anjum- Two-star Air Vice Marshal of Pakistan Air Force
- Sher Shah Awan VC, commander of an ambushed platoon in the Burma Campaign where despite his shattered leg he crawled at the enemy to continue to fight

== Places of interest ==
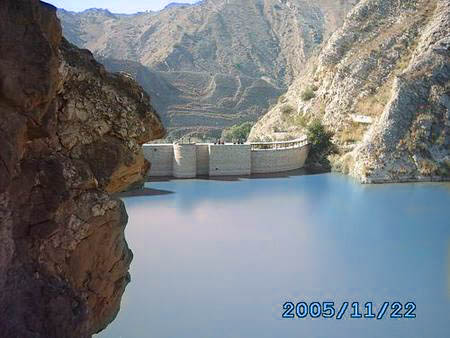
A view of Namal Lake in Mianwali Salt range

"Days of Yore" PR ZE. class 230 en route to Lakki Marwat from Mari Indus in frosty winter morning circa 1987. (Mianwali was the only district in Punjab with about 80 km of narrow gauge section, which was closed in 1992.)

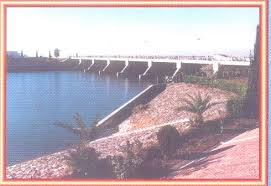
Chashma barrage near Kundian (Mianwali)

- Mari Indus railway station
- Kalabagh Dam
- Jinnah Barrage
- Chashma Barrage
- Namal Lake
- Kundian Railway Station
- Daud Khel Railway Station
- Mari Indus Railway Station

== See also ==
- Divisions of Pakistan
  - Mianwali Division
- Tehsils of Pakistan
  - Tehsils of Punjab
  - Tehsils of Khyber Pakhtunkhwa
  - Tehsils of Balochistan
  - Tehsils of Sindh
  - Tehsils of Azad Kashmir
  - Tehsils of Gilgit-Baltistan
- Districts of Pakistan
  - Districts of Khyber Pakhtunkhwa
  - Districts of Punjab
  - Districts of Balochistan
  - Districts of Sindh
  - Districts of Azad Kashmir
  - Districts of Gilgit-Baltistan
