= Khushab Tehsil =

Tehsil administrative subdivision in Punjab, Pakistan

Khushab Tehsil تحصِيل خُوشاب
- Tehsil
- Country: Pakistan
- Region: Punjab
- District: Khushab District
- Capital: Khushab
- Towns: 6
- Union councils: 32

Population (2017 Census of Pakistan)
  - Total: 689,742
- Time zone: UTC+5 (PST)

Khushab Tehsil (Saraiki: تحصِيل خُوشاب) is an administrative subdivision (tehsil) of Khushab District in the Punjab province of Pakistan.

== History ==
Khushab Tehsil was an agricultural region with forests during the Indus Valley civilization. The Vedic period is characterized by Indo-Aryan culture that invaded from Central Asia and settled in Punjab region. The Kambojas, Daradas, Kaikayas, Madras, Pauravas, Yaudheyas, Malavas, Saindhavas and Kurus invaded, settled and ruled ancient Punjab region. After overrunning the Achaemenid Empire in 331 BCE, Alexander marched into present-day Punjab region with an army of 50,000. The Khushab region was ruled by Maurya Empire, Indo-Greek kingdom, Kushan Empire, Gupta Empire, White Huns, Kushano-Hephthalites, Turk and the Hindu Shahi kingdoms.

In 997 CE, Sultan Mahmud Ghaznavi, took over the Ghaznavid dynasty empire established by his father, Sultan Sebuktegin. He conquered the Shahis in Kabul in 1005, and followed it by the conquests of Punjab region. The Delhi Sultanate and later Mughal Empire ruled the region. The Punjab region became predominantly Muslim due to missionary Sufi saints whose dargahs dot the landscape of Punjab region.

After the decline of the Mughal Empire, the Sikh Empire invaded and occupied Khushab Tehsil. The Muslims faced restrictions during the Sikh rule. During the British rule, Khushab district increased in population and importance. During British rule, Khushab was a tehsil of the old Shahpur District, the tehsil at that time had an area of 2,536 square miles (6,570 km^{2}). The population according to the 1901 census was 161,885, a rise of over 10,000 since 1891.

The predominantly Muslim population supported All-India Muslim League and the Pakistan Movement. After the independence of Pakistan in 1947, the minority Hindus and Sikhs migrated to India while some of the Muslim refugees from India settled in the Khushab Tehsil.

== Administration ==
Khushab tehsil is subdivided into 32 Union Councils:

- Angah
- Botala
- Chak No.50/Mb
- Chak No.59/Mb
- Daiwal
- Girote
- Hadali-I
- Hadali-Ii
- Hassanpur Tiwana
- Jabbi Shareef
- Jauharabad-I
- Jauharabad-Ii
- Katha Saghral
- Khabaki
- Khura
- Khushab-I
- Khushab-Ii
- Khushb-Iii
- Khushab-Iv
- Khushab-V
- Kufri
- Kund
- Mitha Tiwana
- Nali Shumali
- Nari
- Naushehra
- Padhrar
- Roda
- Sandral
- Tilokar
- Uchali
- Waheer
