= Sargodha Division =

Sargodha Division سرگودھا ڈویژن
- Division
- Sargodha Division in Punjab
- Coordinates: 32°10′N 72°30′E
- Country: Pakistan
- Province: (Punjab, Pakistan) Punjab
- Capital: Sargodha
- Established: 1960
- Districts: 4

Government
  - Type: Divisional Administration
  - Divisional Commissioner: Dr Irshad Ahmed
  - Regional Police Officer: N/A

Area
  - Division: 26,360 km^{2} (10,180 sq mi)
- Elevation: 155 m (509 ft)

Population (2023)
  - Division: 9,591,275
  - Density: 363.86/km^{2} (942.4/sq mi)
  - Urban: 2,744,219 (28.61%)
  - Rural: 6,847,056

Literacy
  - Literacy rate: Total: (63.19%); Male: (73.36%); Female: (52.65%)
- Time zone: UTC+5 (PST)
- Postal code: 40100 (Sargodha); 41000 (Khushab); 41000 (Mianwali); 41000 (Bhakkar)
- Dialling code: 048 (Sargodha); 0454 (Khushab)
- Website: sargodhadivision.punjab.gov.pk

Sargodha Division is an administrative division of Punjab province, Pakistan. Sargodha city is the capital of the division. Divisions are the third tier of government in Pakistan, below the federal and provincial levels.

In 2000, local government reforms abolished administrative divisions and raised the districts to the new third tier of government. But in 2008, the division system was revived after the restoration of democratic government system.

== Demographics ==
=== Population ===
Historical population
| Year | Pop. | ±% p.a. |
|---|---|---|
| 1951 | 1,835,178 | — |
| 1961 | 2,587,061 | +3.49% |
| 1972 | 3,218,873 | +2.01% |
| 1981 | 3,934,861 | +2.26% |
| 1998 | 6,101,052 | +2.61% |
| 2017 | 9,783,183 | +2.52% |
| 2023 | 11,416,686 | +2.61% |

According to 2023 census, Sargodha division had a population of 9,591,275, roughly equal to the population of Sweden or the US state of Michigan. The overall literacy rate of the division was 63.19%, with males at 73.36% and females at 52.65%.

== Geography ==
Sargodha division shares borders with Gujrat, Mianwali, Rawalpindi and Faisalabad divisions.

== List of the Districts ==
| # | District | Headquarter | Area (km²) | Pop. (2023) | Density (ppl/km²) (2023) | Lit. rate (2023) |
|---|---|---|---|---|---|---|
| 1 | Sargodha | Sargodha | 5,854 | 4,334,448 | 740.1 | 76.73% |
| 2 | Khushab | Jauharabad | 6,511 | 1,501,089 | 230.8 | 62.52% |
| 3 | Mianwali | Mianwali | 5,840 | 1,798,268 | 307.4 | 62.87% |
| 4 | Bhakkar | Bhakkar | 8,153 | 1,957,470 | 240.5 | 55.68% |

== List of the Tehsils ==
| Tehsil | Area (km²) | Pop. (2023) | Density (ppl/km²) (2023) | Lit. rate (2023) | Districts |
|---|---|---|---|---|---|
| Khushab | 2,115 | 816,682 | 386.14 | 65.94% | Khushab District |
| Noorpur Thal | 2,500 | 264,597 | 105.84 | 55.58% | Khushab District |
| Quaidabad | 1,080 | 274,959 | 254.59 | 55.11% | Khushab District |
| Naushera (Wadi-e-Soon) | 816 | 144,851 | 177.51 | 70.43% | Khushab District |
| Bhalwal | 663 | 387,262 | 584.11 | 79.31% | Sargodha District |
| Bhera | 504 | 384,403 | 762.70 | 67.37% | Sargodha District |
| Kot Momin | 948 | 544,208 | 574.06 | 56.33% | Sargodha District |
| Sahiwal | 829 | 407,487 | 491.54 | 63.34% | Sargodha District |
| Sargodha | 1,536 | 1,800,455 | 1,172.17 | 71.82% | Sargodha District |
| Shahpur | 769 | 424,746 | 552.34 | 61.85% | Sargodha District |
| Sillanwali | 607 | 385,887 | 635.73 | 63.07% | Sargodha District |
| Bhakkar | 2,427 | 809,789 | 333.66 | 58.56% | Bhakkar District |
| Darya Khan | 1,719 | 421,309 | 245.09 | 51.09% | Bhakkar District |
| Kaloorkot | 2,239 | 415,708 | 185.67 | 55.43% | Bhakkar District |
| Mankera | 1,768 | 310,664 | 175.71 | 54.83% | Bhakkar District |
| Isakhel | 1,863 | 414,100 | 222.28 | 55.02% | Mianwali District |
| Mianwali | 2,689 | 908,405 | 337.82 | 66.09% | Mianwali District |
| Piplan | 1,288 | 475,763 | 369.38 | 63.46% | Mianwali District |

== Constituencies ==
| Provincial Assembly Constituency | National Assembly Constituency | District |
|---|---|---|
| PP-71 Sargodha-I | NA-82 Sargodha-I | Sargodha |
| PP-72 Sargodha-II | NA-82 Sargodha-I | Sargodha |
| PP-73 Sargodha-III | NA-83 Sargodha-II | Sargodha |
| PP-74 Sargodha-IV | NA-83 Sargodha-II | Sargodha |
| PP-75 Sargodha-V | NA-84 Sargodha-III | Sargodha |
| PP-76 Sargodha-VI | NA-84 Sargodha-III | Sargodha |
| PP-77 Sargodha-VII | NA-85 Sargodha-IV | Sargodha |
| PP-78 Sargodha-VIII | NA-85 Sargodha-IV | Sargodha |
| PP-79 Sargodha-IX | NA-86 Sargodha-V | Sargodha |
| PP-80 Sargodha-X | NA-86 Sargodha-V | Sargodha |
| PP-81 Khushab-I | NA-87 Khushab-I | Khushab |
| PP-82 Khushab-II | NA-87 Khushab-I | Khushab |
| PP-83 Khushab-III | NA-88 Khushab-II | Khushab |
| PP-84 Khushab-IV | NA-88 Khushab-II | Khushab |
| PP-85 Mianwali-I | NA-89 Mianwali-I | Mianwali |
| PP-86 Mianwali-II | NA-89 Mianwali-I | Mianwali |
| PP-87 Mianwali-III | NA-90 Mianwali-II | Mianwali |
| PP-88 Mianwali-IV | NA-90 Mianwali-II | Mianwali |
| PP-89 Bhakkar-I | NA-91 Bhakkar-I | Bhakkar |
| PP-90 Bhakkar-II | NA-91 Bhakkar-I | Bhakkar |
| PP-91 Bhakkar-III | NA-92 Bhakkar-II | Bhakkar |
| PP-92 Bhakkar-IV | NA-92 Bhakkar-II | Bhakkar |
| PP-93 Bhakkar-V | NA-92 Bhakkar-II | Bhakkar |

== Notable people ==
- Malik Shakir Bashir Awan - politician, lawyer, social activist
- Mohammad Hafeez – former captain of Pakistan national cricket team and Lahore Qalandars player
- Attaullah Khan Esakhelvi – Pakistani award-winning musician from Isakhel, Mianwali.
- Suhail Warraich – journalist and television host from Jauharabad, Khushab.
- Imran Khan – former Prime Minister of Pakistan from Mianwali.
- Misbah-ul-Haq – former Test captain and coach of the Pakistan cricket team.

== See also ==
- Divisions of Pakistan
  - Divisions of Balochistan
  - Divisions of Khyber Pakhtunkhwa
  - Divisions of Punjab
  - Divisions of Sindh
  - Divisions of Azad Kashmir
  - Divisions of Gilgit-Baltistan
