= Chak 42 MB =

Village in Khushab District, Punjab, Pakistan

Chak 42 MB is a small village in Khushab District, Punjab, Pakistan.

== Location ==
The village is located approximately 19 kilometres (12 mi) from the district headquarters, Jauharabad, and 5 km from the nearby town of Mitha Tiwana. It is the seat of the union council of Botala. The village, with a population of approximately 3,000 people, covers an area of nearly 3 km^{2} (1.2 sq mi). It is one of the fourteen villages that were settled after gaining independence in 1947.

== Demography ==
Army officers, junior commission officers, and soldiers were first settled in Chak 42 MB, which was known as 3 Chack Faujianwal at the time. Some civilian families also settled there later on. Chaudry Nabi Bukhsh Arain, Chaudry Ismail Arain, Subedar Rana Nazir Ahmed, Haveldar Muhammad Akber, and Allahi Bukhsh founded the village. Arain, Rajput, Khilgi, Jat, Rana, Malik, Khoher, and Shakh families live in this village. Chak 42 MB is a planned village with straight streets. The major governmental facility in the village is the union council office. A road connects this village with Mitha Tiwana and Botala in the west, and all thirteen chacks, district city Khushab, and Juaharabad in the east.
