= Haveli Majoka =

Haveli Majoka حویلی مجوکہ
- Village
- Location within Pakistan
- Coordinates: 31°49′37″N 72°15′39″E
- Country: Pakistan
- Province: Punjab
- District: Khushab
- Tehsil: Khushab
- Time zone: UTC+5 (PST)

Haveli Majoka is a big village located at the Jhelum River in Pakistan. The geographical coordinates are 31° 49' 37" North, 72° 15' 39" East. The village comprises almost only a single tribe, the Majoka. That is also the reason for the name, Haveli being the word of for a large house with courtyard.

The original village was located on the western bank of the river Jhelum. This is traditionally called Haveli Majoka. Whereas the inhabitants shifted to the eastern bank due to the fertile land there. This part is traditionally called "Kacha Majoka". Owing to its inhabitants, now Kacha Majoka is also referred to as Haveli Majoka.

Haveli Majoka is included in the Khushab Tehsil of the Khushab district, whereas Kacha Majoka is included in Sahiwal Tehsil of the Sargodha district in the Punjab province in Pakistan.

Expatriates from this village are now living in many parts of Pakistan, the US, Canada, UK, Germany, and the Middle East.
