= PP-82 Khushab-II =

Constituency of the Punjabi Provincial Legislature, Pakistan

- Constituency for the Provincial Assembly of Punjab
- Region: Khushab Tehsil (partly) including Khushab and Jauharabad cities of Khushab District

Current constituency
- Created: 2023
- Created from: PP-41 Khushab-III (2002-2018)

PP-82 Khushab-II (پی پی-82، خُوشاب-2) is a Constituency of Provincial Assembly of Punjab. It was abolished after 2018 delimitations when Khushab lost 1 constituency. After 2023 Delimitations Khushab regained its 4th constituency.

== General elections 2024 ==
Provincial election 2024: PP-82 Khushab-II
Party	Candidate	Votes	%	±%
PML(N)	Muhammad Asif Malik	41,577	36.60	
Independent	Masood Anwar (Note: Filed nomination papers as PTI candidate but ECP allowed him to run as an Independent)	39,529	34.79	
Independent	Sardar Altaf Ali Raza Khan	10,771	9.48	
TLP	Muhammad Noor UI Hassan	6,014	5.29	
JUI (F)	Sajjad Manzoor	5,147	4.53	
Independent	Muhammad Akash Ahmad	3,186	2.80	
Others	Others (twenty two candidates)	7,385	6.51	
Turnout		116,551	49.45	
Total valid votes		113,609	97.48	
Rejected ballots		2,942	2.52	
Majority		2,048	1.81	
Registered electors		235,675		
hold				

== General elections 2013 ==
Provincial election 2013 : PP-41 Khushab-III
Party	Candidate	Votes	%	±%
PML(N)	Muhammad Asif Malik	40,082	40.44	
Independent	Haji Muhammad Sharif Khan	21,626	21.82	
Independent	Muhammad Umar Ali Khan	15,021	15.16	
Independent	Anwar Arain	6,954	7.02	
PTI	Doctor Muhammad Khalid Bashir Awan	6,647	6.71	
PPP	Sajjad Hussain Khan	4,078	4.11	
JI	Tanzir Ul Hassan	1,921	1.94	
Independent	Atta Muhammad Thaheem	1,154	1.16	
Others	Others (ten candidates)	1,632	1.65	
Turnout		102,687	56.02	
Total valid votes		99,115	96.52	
Rejected ballots		3,572	3.48	
Majority		18,456	18.62	
Registered electors		183,288		
hold				

== General elections 2008 ==
Provincial election 2008 : PP-41 Khushab-III
Party	Candidate	Votes	%	±%
Independent	Muhammad Asif Malik	27,338	37.46	
Independent	Malik Muhammad Ehsan Ullah Tiwana	16,442	22.53	
PML(N)	Muhammad Umer Khan	15,176	20.79	
Independent	Javed Iqbal Randhawa	8,257	11.31	
PPP	Malik Sultan Mehmood Tiwana	4,973	6.81	
Others	Others	800	1.10	
Turnout		75,876	53.72	
Total valid votes		72,986	96.19	
Rejected ballots		2,890	3.81	
Majority		10,896	14.93	
Registered electors		141,249		

== See also ==
- PP-81 Khushab-I
- PP-83 Khushab-III
