= Malik Khuda Buksh Tiwana =

Pakistani politician

Malik Khuda Buksh Tiwana is a political leader from Hassanpur Tiwana, Khushab District of Punjab, Pakistan.

== Political career ==
He was the first chairman of district council Khushab. He has been elected as member, National Assembly of Pakistan (MNA) twice and MPA without any party ticket (elected as an independent candidate) as well as has served as the provincial minister several times.

His brothers Saif Tiwana and Ghulam Muhammad Tiwana served as members of the National Assembly of Pakistan as well and his brother Ehsan Tiwana served as the district Nazim of Khushab. KB Tiwana is known for bringing the current elected politicians of Khushab into politics as he served as their mentor that include Sumaira Malik, Malik Naeem Khan Awan.

His brother Malik Ehsan Ullah Tiwana joined Pakistan Tehreek e Insaf in 2010 and since then has been loyal to the party, bringing an end to their family's record of contesting independently without any party affiliation. He recently won the 2018 elections for National Assembly from NA 94 on a PTI ticket and currently chairs the Standing Committee on Foreign Affairs. KB Tiwana, though, now sidelined from politics, still has a massive following in his district Khushab. He is well known for his political knowledge in national and local political circles.

== History ==
He was born in Hamoka, a village in Khushab District, Pakistan.
