= Noorpur, Punjab =

Noorpur may refer to one of the following places in Punjab, Pakistan:

- Noorpur Thal, a city in Khushab District of Punjab
  - Noorpur Thal Tehsil, a tehsil in Khushab District of Punjab
  - Jamali Noorpur, a union council of Khushab District
- Noor Pur 122 JB, a town in Faisalabad District of Punjab
- Noorpur, Chakwal, a town in Chakwal District of Punjab
