= Bijar =

Bijar (Persian: بیجار) may refer to:

== Places ==
=== Iran ===
- Bijar County, an administrative division of Kurdistan province, Iran
- Bijar (city), a city in Bijar County
- Bijar, Nehbandan, a village in South Khorasan province, Iran
- Bijar volcanic field, a volcanic field in western Iran

=== Pakistan ===
- Bijar, Punjab, a village in Pakistan

== Other uses ==
- Bijar rug, a type of Persian carpet

== See also ==
- Bejar (disambiguation)
