= Kufri =

Kufri can refer to:

- Kufri, India
- Kufri, Pakistan
