= PP-81 Khushab-I =

Constituency of the Punjabi Provincial Legislature, Pakistan

- Constituency for the Provincial Assembly of Punjab
- Region: Naushera Tehsil and Khushab Tehsil (partly) of Khushab District

Current constituency
- Created from: PP-39 Khushab-I (2002-2018); PP-82 Khushab-I (2018-2023)

PP-81 Khushab-I (پی پی-81، خُوشاب-1) is a Constituency of Provincial Assembly of Punjab.

== General elections 2024 ==
Provincial election 2024: PP-81 Khushab-I
Party	Candidate	Votes	%	±%
Independent	Hasan Aslam Awan (Note: Filed nomination papers as PTI candidate but ECP allowed him to run as an Independent)	46,991	36.02	
IPP	Ameer Haider Sangha	32,294	24.76	
TLP	Mukhtar Ahmed Malik	18,234	13.98	
PPP	Azhar Ali Awan	17,146	13.14	
JUI (F)	Atta Ullah Khan	7,918	6.07	
Independent	Nisar Aslam Khan	2,964	2.27	
JI	Shiraz Amin Awan	2,059	1.58	
Others	Others (eight candidates)	2,846	2.18	
Turnout		134,254	52.81	
Total valid votes		130,452	97.17	
Rejected ballots		3,802	2.83	
Majority		14,697	11.26	
Registered electors		254,204		
hold				

== General elections 2018 ==
Provincial election 2018: PP-82 Khushab-I
Party	Candidate	Votes	%	±%
PTI	Fateh Khaliq	71,925	46.94	
PML(N)	Karam Elahi Bandial	43,244	28.22	
TLP	Nasir Knan Awan	25,208	16.45	
Independent	Muhammad Sagheer	10,071	6.57	
Others	Others (two candidates)	2,787	1.82	
Turnout		158,611	58.29	
Total valid votes		153,235	96.61	
Rejected ballots		5,376	3.39	
Majority		28,681	18.72	
Registered electors		272,102		

== General elections 2013 ==
Provincial election 2013: PP-39 Khushab-I
Party	Candidate	Votes	%	±%
PML(N)	Malik Muhammad Javed Iqbal Awan	42,635	41.39	
PTI	Malik Ameer Mukhtar Sangha Awan	38,475	37.36	
Independent	Malik Mehmood UI Hassan Awan	9,854	9.57	
Independent	Faisal Aziz Malik	5,707	5.54	
Independent	Malik Mukhtar Ahmed Awan	4,490	4.36	
PPP	Dr. Malik Naeem Sadig Awan	1,418	1.38	
APML	Malik Muhammad Asghar Awan	417	0.40	
Turnout		107,472	60.61	
Total valid votes		102,996	95.84	
Rejected ballots		4,476	4.16	
Majority		4,160	4.03	
Registered electors		177,321		

== General elections 2008 ==
Provincial election 2008: PP-39 Khushab-I
Party	Candidate	Votes	%	±%
Independent	Malik Muhammad Javed Iqbal Awan	24,235	28.62	
PML(Q)	Faisal Aziz	19,538	23.07	
Independent	Raja Hassan Nawaz Khan	16,810	19.85	
Independent	Malik Mukhtar Ahmed Awan	14,101	16.65	
PML(N)	Malik Iftikhar Hussain Awan	5,089	6.01	
MMA	Maulana Muhammad Sibtain Shah Naqvi	2,800	3.31	
PPP	Malik Muhammad Javed Awan	2,105	2.49	
Turnout		89,359	58.52	
Total valid votes		84,678	94.76	
Rejected ballots		4,681	5.24	
Majority		4,697	5.55	
Registered electors		152,709		

== See also ==
- PP-80 Sargodha-X
- PP-82 Khushab-II
