= Ali Hussain Khan =

Pakistani politician (1956–2026)

- علی حسین خان

Member of the Provincial Assembly of Punjab
- In office 24 February 2024 – 8 April 2026

Personal details
- Born: 1 March 1956 Khushab, Punjab Pakistan
- Died: April 2026 (aged 70) Lahore, Punjab, Pakistan
- Party: PMLN (2024–2026)

Ali Hussain Khan Baloch (Urdu: علی حسین خان; 1 March 1956 – April 2026) was a Pakistani politician. He was a Member of the Provincial Assembly of the Punjab from 2024 until his death in 2026.

== Political career ==
Khan was elected to the Provincial Assembly of the Punjab as a candidate of the Pakistan Muslim League (N) (PML-N) from Constituency PP-83 Khushab-III in the 2024 Pakistani general election.

== Death ==
Khan died in April 2026, at the age of 70. He had been being treated at a hospital in Lahore for an illness.
