= Hadli-I =

Hadali-I ہڈالى
- Town and union council
- Country: Pakistan
- Region: Punjab Province
- District: Khushab District
- Time zone: UTC+5 (PST)

Hadali (Urdu: ہڈالى), (I) is one of the 51 Union Councils (administrative subdivisions) of Khushab District in the Punjab Province of Pakistan.
