= Golewali =

Golewali گولےوالی
- town and union council
- Location in Pakistan
- Coordinates: 34°45′N 73°20′E
- Country: Pakistan
- Region: Punjab Province
- District: Khushab District
- Tehsil: Quaidabad

Population
  - town and union council: 45,000
  - Density: 750/km^{2} (1,900/sq mi)
  - Urban: 7,500
  - Urban density: 412/km^{2} (1,070/sq mi)
- Time zone: UTC+5 (PST)

Golewali (Urdu: گولے والی) is a village and one of the 51 Union Councils (administrative subdivisions) of Khushab District in the Punjab Province of Pakistan. It is located at 32°29′21″N 71°50′46″E.

== History ==
Golewali is an ancient village located in Lap Muhar (Daaman-e-Muhar). Dodha(ڈھوڈا) is its older name. New name Golewali was established due to the name of Gola Khan (گولا خان) Gola Khan and different tribes came from (Afghanistan)before three centuries ago.

== Location ==
Golewali is situated in the pale of the Salt Range Mountains also called Daman-e-Mahar. It starts from the hilly area of mountains and ends at plain fieldy areas near Bandial Shumali. It is at a little distance from the Soon-Valley Sakesar. It is at the extreme border of District Khushab and Mianwali. So its culture is more like Mianwali than Khushab.
