= Girote =

Girote گِروٹ
- Village and union council
- Interactive map of Girote گِروٹ
- Coordinates: 32°5′6″N 72°16′29″E
- Country: Pakistan
- Province: Punjab
- District: Khushab
- Tehsil: Khushab

Area
  - Total: 20 km^{2} (7.7 sq mi)
- 31000
- Time zone: UTC+5 (PST)
- Area code: 0454
- 800-year-old town

Girote (Urdu: گِروٹ) is a village in Khushab District, Punjab, Pakistan and one of the district's 51 union councils (Union council No. 28). It is situated on the western bank of River Jhelum, and 26 kilometres (16 mi) south of Khushab city. It is located at 32°5'6N 72°16'29E. Aheer, Syed, Rana, Bhatti and Baloch are the most common surnames in the village. The village has a branch of MCB Bank, a basic health facility, and a post office. Girote is famous for Darbar Sultan Mohammed Jamali. Before Covid, a Mela was held every year. Last time, Mela was organized by Sardar Nasir Mehmood Khan Baloch. With a rich history spanning over 200-300 years, the Mela has been a long-standing tradition organized by Baloch community.

== Education ==
There are boys and girls high schools in Girote. The village has private educational institutes Al-Khalid Lasani Model School, Ali Memorial, Al-Hamza. The literacy rate is below 100%.
