= PP-83 Khushab-III =

Constituency of the Punjabi Provincial Legislature, Pakistan

- Constituency for the Provincial Assembly of Punjab
- Region: Khushab Tehsil (partly) and Noorpur Thal Tehsil (partly) including Noorpur Thal Town of Khushab District

Current constituency
- Created from: PP-42 Khushab-IV (2002-2018); PP-84 Khushab-III (2018-2023)

PP-83 Khushab-III (پی پی-83، خُوشاب-3) is a Constituency of Provincial Assembly of Punjab.

== BY-election ==
A by-election was held on due to the death of Ali Hussain Khan, the previous member from this seat. Zafar Khan Baloch, his younger brother and a candidate of PML(N), won the election unopposed.

== General elections 2024 ==
Provincial election 2024: PP-83 Khushab-III
Party	Candidate	Votes	%	±%
PML(N)	Ali Hussain Khan	48,083	35.34	
Independent	Amjad Raza	39,337	28.91	
IPP	Malik Muhammad Ehsan Ullah Tiwana	30,105	22.13	
TLP	Hafiz Sher Muhammad Sialvi	7,060	5.19	
Independent	Abrar	3,202	2.35	
Independent	Malik Ahmad Hassan (Note: Filed nomination papers as PTI candidate but ECP allowed him to run as an Independent)	2,296	1.69	
Others	Others (five candidates)	5,975	4.39	
Turnout		140,766	59.32	
Total valid votes		136,058	96.66	
Rejected ballots		4,708	3.34	
Majority		8,746	6.43	
Registered electors		237,293		
hold				

== General elections 2018 ==
Provincial election 2018: PP-84 Khushab-III
Party	Candidate	Votes	%	±%
PML(N)	Muhammad Waris Shad	66,775	41.90	
PTI	Sardar Shujja Muhammad Khan	60,288	37.83	
TLP	Hafiz Sher Muhammad Sialvi	12,346	7.75	
Independent	Rana Khalid Mehmood	10,796	6.77	
MMA	Muhammad Waris	4,856	3.05	
Independent	Muhammad Imran Farooq	1,731	1.09	
Others	Others (three candidates)	2,592	1.63	
Turnout		165,705	61.86	
Total valid votes		159,384	96.19	
Rejected ballots		6,321	3.81	
Majority		6,487	4.07	
Registered electors		267,858		

== General elections 2013 ==
Provincial election 2013: PP-42 Khushab-IV
Party	Candidate	Votes	%	±%
PML(N)	Muhammad Waris Kallu	50,616	46.10	
Independent	Malik Khuda Bukhsh Tiwana	50,148	45.68	
PTI	Gul Asghar Khan	7,797	7.10	
Others	Others (seven candidates)	1,225	1.12	
Turnout		112,802	70.22	
Total valid votes		109,786	97.33	
Rejected ballots		3,016	2.67	
Majority		468	0.42	
Registered electors		160,631		

== General elections 2008 ==
Provincial election 2008: PP-42 Khushab-IV
Party	Candidate	Votes	%	±%
Independent	Malik Muhammad Waris Kalo	42,093	48.13	
Independent	Syed Zulqarnain Shah	26,271	30.04	
PML(N)	Aziz Hussain	16,444	18.80	
PPP	Gohar Jamal	2,216	2.53	
Independent	Jalil Ahmad	427	0.49	
Turnout		90,453	68.24	
Total valid votes		87,451	96.68	
Rejected ballots		3,002	3.32	
Majority		15,822	18.09	
Registered electors		132,550		

== See also ==
- PP-82 Khushab-II
- PP-84 Khushab-IV
