= Jharkal =

Coordinates: 31°48′N 71°50′E

Jharkil
- Village and union council # 45
- Interactive map of Jharkil
- Country: Pakistan
- Region: Punjab Province
- District: Khushab District

Population
  - Total: approximate 5,000
- Time zone: UTC+5 (PST)

Jharkil is a village and one of the 45 Union Councils (administrative subdivisions) of Khushab District in the Punjab Province of Pakistan. It is located at 31°48'0N 71°49'60E and located 13 kilometers toward south from Noorpur Thal city.

Jharkil consists of several small villages, including Jharkil, Meikin, Jara, Nawan Saggu, Katimar, Sidha and Nikro Shaheed. Saggu, Jara, Khara, Chuhan, Aura, Bhutto, Harral, Balooch, Lohaar, Ghahi and Dhoda are major castes in the Union.

== Education ==
The education rate has increased since 2010, however there is no single college for either boys or girls in the Union Council. Agriculture and animal farming provide the majority of income. Volleyball and Kabaddi are the prominent sports in the area.

This union council needs proper roads for inter village connectivity, high schools for girls in villages and technical college for boys.
