= PP-84 Khushab-IV =

Constituency of the Punjabi Provincial Legislature, Pakistan

- Constituency for the Provincial Assembly of Punjab
- Region: Quaidabad Tehsil and Noorpur Thal Tehsil (partly) of Khushab District

Current constituency
- Created from: PP-40 Khushab-II (2002-2018); PP-83 Khushab-II (2018-2023)

PP-84 Khushab-IV (پی پی-84، خُوشاب-4) is a Constituency of Provincial Assembly of Punjab.

== General elections 2024 ==
Provincial election 2024: PP-84 Khushab-IV
Party	Candidate	Votes	%	±%
Independent	Fateh Khaliq (Note: Filed nomination papers as PTI candidate but ECP allowed him to run as an Independent)	49,820	42.63	
PML(N)	Karam Elahi Bandial	35,005	29.95	
IPP	Muhammad Zubair	8,116	6.94	
TLP	Ahmad Hassan	7,997	6.84	
Independent	Muhammad Akram Khan	4,960	4.24	
Independent	Raheel Nasir	4,005	3.43	
Others	Others (nine candidates)	6,976	5.97	
Turnout		123,274	57.60	
Total valid votes		116,879	94.81	
Rejected ballots		6,395	5.19	
Majority		14,815	12.68	
Registered electors		214,014		
hold				

== General elections 2018 ==
Provincial election 2018: PP-83 Khushab-II
Party	Candidate	Votes	%	±%
Independent	Malik Ghulam Rasool Sangha	69,036	44.41	
PML(N)	Muhammad Asif Malik	47,764	30.73	
Independent	Malik Zafar Ullah Khan Bugti	10,876	7.00	
TLP	Dildar Hussain Rizvi	9,576	6.16	
PTI	Gul Asghar Khan	8,537	5.49	
Independent	Muhammad Saleem Iqbal	2,791	1.80	
AAT	Shazia Kausar	2,544	1.64	
PPP	Nisar Ahmad Khan	1,899	1.22	
Independent	Saif Ullah Khan	1,660	1.07	
Others	Others (two candidates)	774	0.04	
Turnout		161,706	56.04	
Total valid votes		155,457	96.14	
Rejected ballots		6,249	3.86	
Majority		21,272	13.68	
Registered electors		288,570		

== General elections 2013 ==
Provincial election 2013: PP-40 Khushab-II
Party	Candidate	Votes	%	±%
PML(N)	Karam Elahi Bandial	45,854	47.77	
Independent	Malik Saleha Muhammad Gunjial	38,541	40.15	
Independent	Muhammad Deen Ayub Tiwana	7,328	7.63	
PTI	Malik Hassan Nawaz Gunjial	3,392	3.53	
Others	Others (three candidates)	880	0.92	
Turnout		101,217	63.57	
Total valid votes		95,995	94.84	
Rejected ballots		5,222	5.16	
Majority		7,313	7.62	
Registered electors		159,230		

== See also ==
- PP-83 Khushab-III
- PP-85 Mianwali-I
