= Utra =

Utra may refer to:

- 1447 Utra, asteroid
- E-UTRA, radio standard
- Utra (beetle), a genus of beetles in the subfamily Prioninae
- Utra Janubi, village in Pakistan
- Utra, Finland, a district of Joensuu
