= Jabbi Shareef =

Jabbi Shareef جبّى شرِيف
- Town and union council
- Jabbi Shareef
- Interactive map of Jabbi Shareef جبّى شرِيف
- Coordinates: 32°23′17.0″N 72°05′48.3″E
- Country: Pakistan
- Region: Punjab Province
- District: Khushab District
- Tehsil: Khushab
- Union Council Number: 15
- Time zone: UTC+5 (PST)
- Postal code of Jabbi: 41220
- Area code: 0454

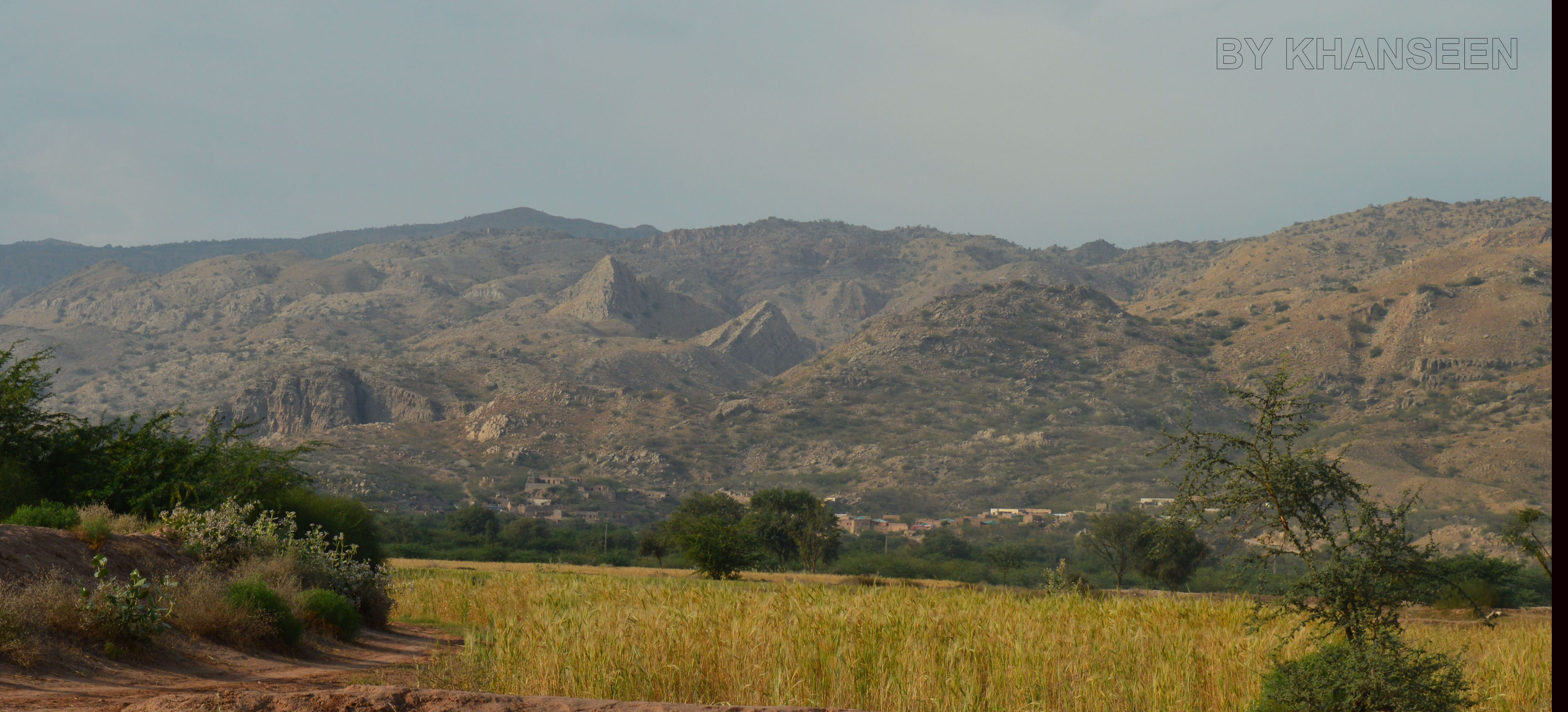
Jabbi village in Khushab

Jabbi Shareef (Urdu: جبّى شرِيف), is one of the 51 Union Councils (administrative subdivisions) of Khushab District in the Punjab Province of Pakistan. It is located 12 km north of Mitha Tiwana railway station at the main Sargodha-Mianwali Road. It is the oldest town of the district. It belongs to Daman-e-Muhar region of which it is the largest town. Sayd (Gilani and Hamdani) are also settled here.It has Gajial the major cast of jabbi shareef village and Jurwaal, Gulyal, Trahar,Pandial, Phirwaal, Hasnaal, Sadqi (Gaji Khanal ) ,Khideral (Awan)as its major castes . Well settle house in mahoullah gajial . The population of Jabbi Shareef is about 40,503 and is divided into three settlements:

Jabbi-Janubi, (population: 645)

Rakh Jabbi, (population: 5010)

Jabbi-Shumali, (population: 35493)

It is a hilly and plain area. The mountains of this region are rich in pink salt. There is also a natural spring here which is known as Mahla (Urdu: مہلہ) in the local language. The water in this spring is very clear and sweet. The fountain has been here since ancient times and is built according to the old style of construction. The water is accessed by going down the stairs.

It covers a vast land of 90 km^{2}. It is located 37 km (23 mi) away from Khushab and 31 km (19 mi) away from Jauharabad. It is located at 32°23'60N 72°5'60E.
