= Roda, Khushab =

Roda
- Village and union council
- Interactive map of Roda
- Coordinates: 32°04′25″N 72°05′59″E
- Country: Pakistan
- Region: Punjab
- District: Khushab District
- Time zone: UTC+5 (PST)
- Postal code: 41030

Roda is a village and union council of Khushab District in the Punjab province of Pakistan. It is located southwest of Khushab city.

== History ==
The area around Roda saw settlement in the early decades of the nineteenth century during Ranjit Singh's reign, after he led a campaign in the area in 1821.

In the Revenue Settlement of 1860, the name "Roda" was officially designated for this locality. The choice of the name is attributed to the appearance of the area's terrain at the time, characterized by a distinct lack of trees, resembling a bald landscape in the Punjabi language.

As per revenue record of Khushab, the following castes inhabited Roda Thal in 1860s: 1.Ranghar Rajpoot (Rana), 2.Joyia, Yarra Khel, Mahram Khel, 3. Kharal 4. Mummak (subcaste of Tiwana), 5. Kallu, 6. Janjua. 7. Bhatti 8. Bourana, 9. (Chalra) Joyia 10. Awan 11. Dhoodhan Notable personalities of Roda Thal are Rana Wakeel Ahmad(late) ,(Due to his unforgettable efforts, Boys High School was built in Roda and electricity was established). ambassador Malik Saifullah Khan Mummak, Malik Khuda Bakhsh, DSP Raiwind (Lahore), Master Muhammad Afzal Khan Janjua, MPA Malik Waris Kallu (Late), Malik Muhammad Khan Numberdaar (Late), Malik Allah Baksh Numberdaar, Chairman Malik Muhammad Ameer Killasi (Late) and MPA Malik Muazzam Sher Kallu Malik Fateh Sher (chalra) Master Muhammad Sher Chalra. Master Malik zafar ullah Chalrra Joyia (Arbitrator)

== Culture ==
Roda is home to 39 castes and clans. Both men and women wear the traditional shalwar kameez. Popular sports in Roda include thobi ball (volleyball), cricket, and kabadi. Allah Ditta Nahra (late) and Master Malik Mohammad Sher Chhalra Joyia (late) were the best and famous players of shooting volleyball.

The community is rich and strong.

== Geography ==
The village, Roda includes flat as well as desert type land, that is situated in between famous cities, from north Mitha Tiwana, from south Noorpur Thal, from east Chowk Girote and from west Adhi Coat.

== Education ==
Roda is rich in educational institutes w.r.t its population and culture as it has 2 Government Degree Colleges (one for Boys and one for Girls), two high schools (one for boys and other for girls) and several primary schools including Government and private institutes. Some famous private institutes are like, (Dar-e- Arqum school, Ghazali Education Trust, Nasar Public High School, Al-Qalam Group of Schools, Faheem Memorial Model School.

Most of the people here prefer their own business which includes buying and selling of vehicles and tractors, wood stalls and selling of agricultural commodities.
