= Mardwal =

- Village and Union Council
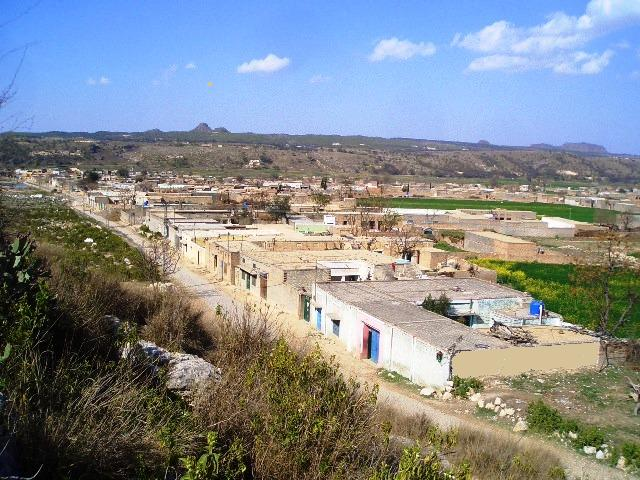
- A view of Mardwal

- Location in Pakistan
- Coordinates: 32°36′0″N 72°10′0″E
- Country: Pakistan
- Region: Punjab Province
- District: Khushab District
- Tehsil: Naushera
- Time zone: UTC+5 (PST)
- Area code: 0454-

Mardwal (Urdu: مردوال) is a village in union council of Naushera Tehsil, Khushab District, Punjab Province, Pakistan. It is situated in the Soon Valley region of the Salt Range in northwestern Punjab. The union council covers approximately 122 square kilometres and includes several neighbouring settlements, including Dhadhar, Makroomi, Noshera Rural, Ganwali, Thikrali, and Saura Kadhar.Soon Valley Ecotourism Master Plan 2040 (PDF) (Report). The Urban Unit, Government of Punjab.

== Geography ==
Mardwal is located at approximately 32°36′N 72°10′E and has an elevation of about 796 metres (2,612 ft) above sea level."Mardwal, Punjab, Pakistan". Tageo. The village lies about 5 kilometres north of Naushera and is connected to surrounding settlements through the Naushera–Rawalpindi Road.

The area forms part of the Soon Valley, a scenic valley in the Salt Range known for its hills, forests, lakes, and agricultural land. Nearby forests include Rakh Mardwal and Rakh Khairrot, which contribute to the ecological diversity of the region.

== Notable people ==
Hadi Baksh - Political figure of the village.

Lieutenant Muhammad Abbas Shaheed – Pakistan Army officer and former cadet of Military College Murree who was martyred in the Gujranwala train derailment incident on 2 July 2023 while travelling with his unit.

Muhammad Ali - Social Activist

Muhammad Deen - Religious Scholar and preacher

Molvi Idrees - Imam Masjid

Shah Dil Awan - Lawer, Researcher and Journalist (Wrote 7 Books including Manzar-e-Soon, Mashaheer Soon, Umdatul Awan, Tohfatul Awan, Editor in Chief Daily Soon Times Islamabad / Sargodha / Karachi.

Dost Muhammad (Ganja) - Influential landlord

Shakeel Ahmad - Political Figure

Malik Mushtaq Ahmad Khan – educationist and social worker.

Professor Iqbal - cited among respected academic personalities from the village.

Major Fateh Khan – military officer associated with Mardwal.

Master Allah Baksh – educator and community leader.

Master Atta Muhammad – educator.

Professor Iqbal – academic figure from the village.

== Climate ==
Mardwal experiences a semi-arid subtropical climate with hot summers and cool winters. Most annual rainfall occurs during the monsoon season between July and September.Management Plan for Uchhali Wetlands Complex, Pakistan (PDF) (Report). Ramsar Convention Secretariat.

The village is located near the Uchhali Wetlands Complex, a Ramsar-designated wetland system consisting of the lakes Uchhali, Khabbaki and Jahlar. The wetlands support migratory waterfowl and a variety of wildlife species native to the Salt Range.

== History ==
The wider Soon Valley region contains archaeological and historical remains dating to ancient times, including forts, caves, shrines and Buddhist sites. The Salt Range has historically been part of several major political entities, including the Ghaznavid Empire, the Delhi Sultanate, the Mughal Empire and British India.Syed, Javaid Haider (2014). "History of the Salt Range" (PDF). Journal of the Punjab University Historical Society.

Like many settlements in the Soon Valley, Mardwal is predominantly associated with the Awan tribe, whose presence in the region dates back several centuries.Gazetteer of Shahpur District, 1883–84 (PDF).

Following the partition of British India in 1947, Mardwal became part of Pakistan. In 1982, it was incorporated into the newly established Khushab District, which was separated from Sargodha District."Khushab District Profile". Government of Punjab.

== Demographics ==
According to the Election Commission of Pakistan voter lists (2013), Mardwal is among the larger villages in the Soon Valley, with approximately 5,670 registered voters, making it one of the higher voter-population settlements in the region after Naushera and Uchali.

The population is predominantly Muslim and mainly belongs to the Awan tribe. The Awans of Mardwal are traditionally organized into several clans (locally called biradaris or sub-tribal branches), including Atwal, Badhral, Budhial, Dirral, Gulial, Majhial, Makwal, Mumdal, Phathwal, Samlal, Sirral, Wadhial, Rajbal, and Bare.

Punjabi is the primary language spoken in the village, with a local dialect influenced by the broader Soon Valley region.

== Economy ==
Agriculture is the principal economic activity in Mardwal and the surrounding area. Major crops include wheat, maize, potatoes, onions, cauliflower and other seasonal vegetables. Fruit cultivation and livestock rearing also contribute to the local economy.

The village forms part of the wider agricultural economy of the Soon Valley, where farming remains dependent on rainfall, groundwater resources and seasonal watercourses.

== Infrastructure ==
Mardwal is linked to neighbouring settlements by local roads and regional highways serving the Soon Valley. Public transport is primarily provided by privately operated vans and buses connecting the village with Naushera, Khushab and other nearby towns.

Basic educational and healthcare facilities are available within the union council, while more advanced services are accessed in Naushera and Khushab. Electricity is supplied through the national grid, and mobile telecommunications services are available through national operators.

== Environment ==
The area surrounding Mardwal contains dry subtropical scrub forests, wetlands and rangelands characteristic of the Salt Range ecosystem. Wildlife recorded in the region includes the Punjab urial, chinkara and numerous resident and migratory bird species.

Environmental challenges in the area include water scarcity, groundwater depletion, soil erosion and deforestation. Conservation efforts in the wider Soon Valley have focused on wetland protection, forest management and biodiversity conservation.
