= Khai Khurd =

Coordinates: 31°50′N 72°13′E

- Interactive map of Khai Khurd
- Country: Pakistan
- Region: Punjab Province
- District: Khushab District

Government
- Time zone: UTC+5 (PST)

Khai Khurd is a village and one of the 51 Union Councils (administrative subdivisions) of Khushab District in the Punjab Province of Pakistan. It is located at 31°49'0N 72°13'0E.
