= Tilloker =

Talokar تِلوكر
- Village and union council
- Talokar
- Country: Pakistan
- Region: Punjab Province
- District: Khushab District

Population
  - Total: 1,111
- Time zone: UTC+5 (PST)

Talokar (Urdu: تِلوكر) is a village and one of the 51 Union Councils (administrative subdivisions) of Khushab District in the Punjab Province of Pakistan.
