= Chak Fourteen MB =

Coordinates: 32°10′N 71°52′E

Chak Fourteen MB Chak 14/MB
- Village and union council
- Interactive map of Chak Fourteen MB
- Country: Pakistan
- Region: Punjab Province
- District: Khushab District
- Time zone: UTC+5 (PST)

Chak Fourteen MB is a village and one of the 51 Union Councils (administrative subdivisions) of Khushab District in the Punjab Province of Pakistan. It is located at 32°10'0N 72°52'20E.
