= Jaura Kalan =

Coordinates: 31°54′N 72°14′E

Joura Kalan
- Village and union council
- Interactive map of Joura Kalan
- Country: Pakistan
- Region: Punjab Province
- District: Khushab District
- Time zone: UTC+5 (PST)

Joura Kalan is a village and one of the 51 Union Councils (administrative subdivisions) of Khushab District in the Punjab Province of Pakistan. It is located at 31°53'37N 72°13'39E.
