= Bejar (disambiguation) =

Bejar can refer to:

- Béjar, a city in the province of Salamanca in western Spain
  - Duke of Béjar, a Spanish title of nobility from 1453 to the present
- Béjar (surname), a Spanish surname (also rendered as Bejarano, Bexar, or Vejar), for people with this name, see
- Dan Bejar, a singer-songwriter from Vancouver, British Columbia, Canada

== See also ==
- Bexar (disambiguation)
- Bijar (disambiguation)
