= Bandial Janubi =

Bandial Janubi بنديال جنُوبى
- Village and union council
- Country: Pakistan
- Region: Punjab Province
- District: Khushab District
- Time zone: UTC+5 (PST)

Bandial (Urdu: بنديال جنُوبى) is a village and one of the 51 Union Councils (administrative subdivisions) of Khushab District in the Punjab Province of Pakistan.

== Notable people ==
- Malik Sher Muhammad Bandial (He received khilat, was made kursi nasheen in 1917 and inherited 8,000 acres of agricultural land in uttra zail)
- Malik Alamsher Bandial (appointed as Honorary Magistrate in 1935 till Ayub Khan's regime)
- Ex-MPA (late) Malik Khaliqdad Khan Bandial
- Ex-Chief Secretary Punjab (late) Malik Fateh Bandial (father of Umar Ata Bandial)
- Chief Justice of Supreme Court Malik Umar Ata Bandial
- SP retired (late) Malik Pervez Iqbal Bandial
- Malik Farooq Bandial
- Ex Naib Tehsil Nazim Malik Khursheed Iqbal Bandial
- Ex MPA and Ex Parliamentary Secretary Malik Karam Ilahi Bandial
- MPA and Parliamentary Secretary Malik Fateh Khaliq Bandial
- International tent pegger and coach of international tent pegging team of Pakistan Malik Haroon Bandial
