= Chak No.59/Mb =

Chak 59/MB چک نمبر ايم بى/59
- Village and union council
- Country: Pakistan
- Region: Punjab Province
- District: Khushab District
- Time zone: UTC+5 (PST)

Chak 59/MB (Urdu: چک نمبر ايم بى/59) is a village and one of the 51 Union Councils (administrative subdivisions) of Khushab District in the Punjab Province of Pakistan. It is located at 32°10'0N 72°52'20E.
