= Bexar =

Bexar can refer to:

Places:

- Bexar County, Texas, containing the city of San Antonio
- Bexar, Alabama, a community
- Bexar, Arkansas, an unincorporated community
- Béxar, a former spelling of Béjar, a city in the province of Salamanca in western Spain

Military uses:

- USS Bexar (APA-237), a Haskell-class attack transport in the US Navy
- Siege of Béxar (or Bejar), an early campaign of the Texas Revolution

== See also ==
- Behar (disambiguation)
- Bejar (disambiguation)
