= Idris Azad =

Pakistani writer

Idris Azad ادریس آزاد
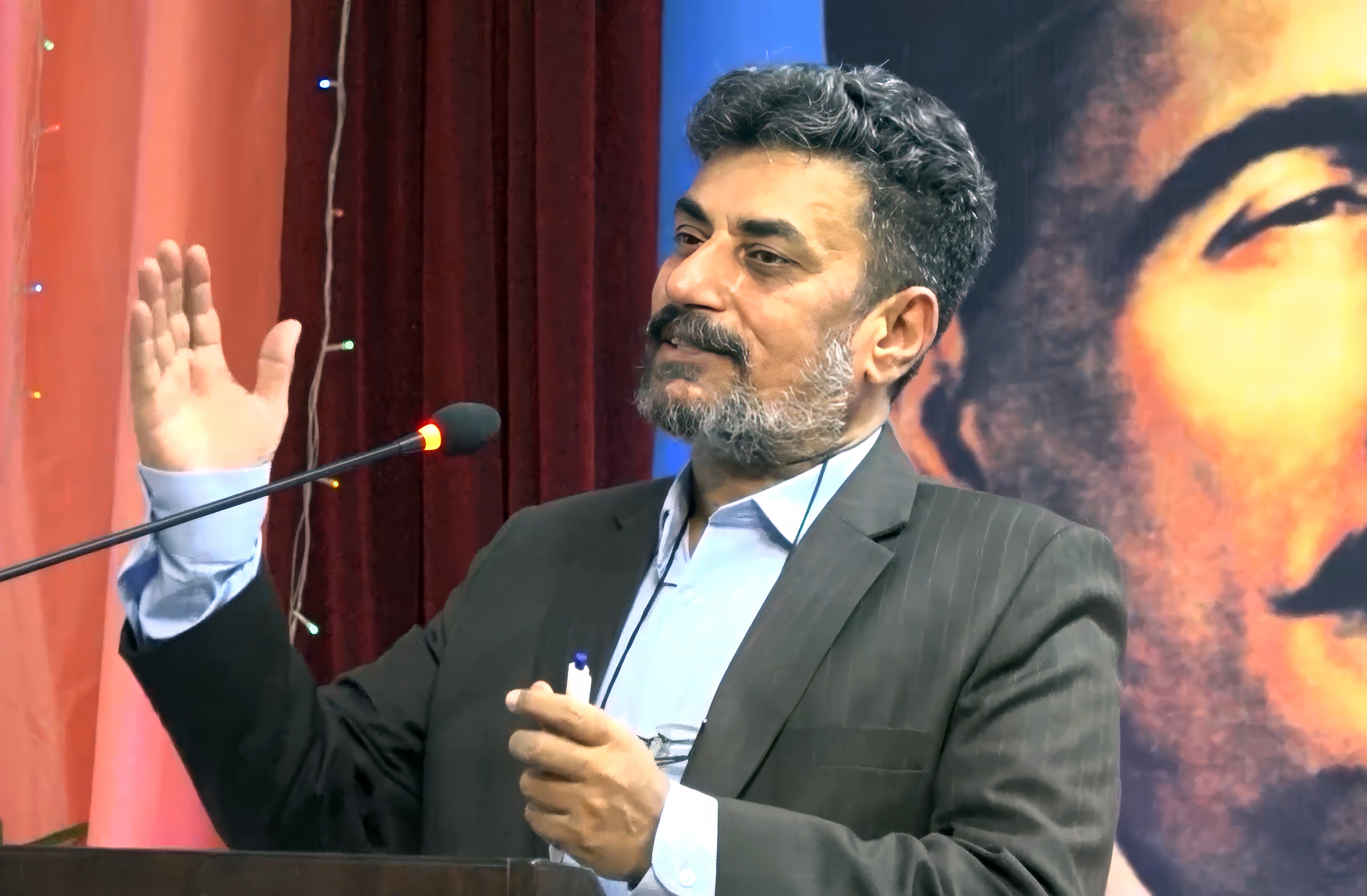
- Idris Azad - December 2023
- Born: Idrees Ahmad; 7 August 1969 (age 57); Khushab, Khushab District, Punjab, Pakistan
- Education: Master of Philosophy
- Occupations: Urdu poet, journalist, writer, philosopher
- Writing career
- Literary movement: Progressive Writers Movement
- Website: www.idrisazad.com

Idris Azad (Urdu: ادریس آزاد, Idrees Ahmad Urdu: ادریس احمد) born on 7 August 1969, is an author, philosopher, novelist, poet, dramatist and columnist. He has written several books on fiction, journalism, critic, poetry, philosophy, mysticism and art. He teaches logic and philosophy at International Islamic University, Islamabad. Idrees Azad is also associated with Pakistan film industry. He is Head of the Department of VFX & CGI at Paragon Academy of Performing Arts, Shabab Noor Studio, Lahore and assists the director Syed Noor in film making as well.

== Early life ==
Azad was born in the house of Saeed Ahmad, in Khushab, city of Punjab, Pakistan. He got his Masters in Philosophy from the University of the Punjab, Lahore.

== Philosophy ==
He elucidated socio-biological evolution. He expands the idea of the Pakistani philosopher Sir Muhammad Iqbal that every living organism on Earth is tightly attached to it and it needs an anti-gravitational force to get rid of Earth-rootedness. He calls this freedom from Earth-Rootedness. He asserts that, being nearer the Earth degrades the value of life. He also asserts that socio-biologically, there are four classes of animals.

1. Swarm
2. Gangs
3. Droves
4. Flocks

== Publications ==
Philosophy

- Aurat, Iblees aur Khuda (عورت، ابلیس اور خدا) (Women, Devil and God)
- Maoseeqi, Tasweer aur Sharaab(موسیقی، تصویر اور شراب) (Music, Picture and Vine)
- Islam Maghrib kay Katehray Main (اسلام، مغرب کے کٹہرے میں) (Islam in the court of West)
- Tassawuf, Science aur Iqbal (تصوف، سائنس اور اقبال) (Mysticism, Science and Iqbal)
- Companion To Philosophy And Logic

Novels

- Sultan Muhammad Fateh (سلطان محمد فاتح)
- Ibn e Attaash (ابن عطاش)
- Sultan Shamsuddin Altamash(سلطان شمس الدین التمش)
- Behr e Aswad kay Us Paar (بحر اسود کے اس پار)
- Undlus kay Qazzaaq (اندلس کے قزاق)
- Qartaajna (قرطاجنہ)

Other Books

- Nai Saleebi Jang aur Usaama (نئی صلیبی جنگ اور اسامہ)
- Baazgusht(باز گشت)
- Manashiyaat aur Tadaaruk (منشیات اور تدارک)
- Nijaat kay Raastay Par (نجات کے راستے پر)
- Ibn e Maryam Hua karay Koi(ابن مریم ہوا کرے کوئی)
