= Jamali Noorpur =

- Town and union council
- Country: Pakistan
- Region: Punjab Province
- District: Khushab District
- Time zone: UTC+5 (PST)

Jamali Noorpur is a town and one of the 51 Union Councils (administrative subdivisions) of the Khushab District in the Punjab Province of Pakistan. Ali Hussain Khan represents the area, PP-83 (Khushab-III) constituency, in the Provincial Assembly of Punjab on a Pakistan Muslim League (N) ticket.
