= Padhrar =

Padhrar پدهراڑ
- Village and union council
- Interactive map of Padhrar پدهراڑ
- Country: Pakistan
- Region: Punjab Province
- District: Khushab District
- Time zone: UTC+5 (PST)
- Website: http://www.padhrar.com

Padhrar (Urdu: پدهراڑ) is a village and union council (an administrative subdivision) of Khushab District located in Punjab, Pakistan. It is part of Khushab tehsil.

== Culture ==
A shrine of prominent Sheikh spiritual leader Baba Syed Adullah Shah Hashmi and Baba Syed Muhammad Shah Karori and his son Baba Syed Hashim Darya Shah of the Sayyid Hashemi family are in Padhrar.

== Geography ==
Padhrar is located at the entrance into Soon Valley, which leads to the mountain peak of Sakesar. The village is located 71 kilometers north of the Khushab District and 48 kilometers south of the Chakwal District. Kallar Kahar is 30 kilometers north east and Talagang is about 49 kilometers north of this town.
