= Ukhli Mohla =

Okhli Mohla
- Village and union council
- Ukhli Mohla
- Country: Pakistan
- Region: Punjab Province
- District: Khushab District
- Time zone: UTC+5 (PST)

Okhli Mohla is a village and one of the 51 Union Councils (administrative subdivisions) of Khushab District in the Punjab Province of Pakistan.
