= Peelu Wains =

Village in Punjab, Pakistan

Peelu Wains پیلو وینس
- Village and Union Council
- Country: Pakistan
- Province: Punjab
- District: Khushab
- Tehsil: Noorpur Thal
- Time zone: UTC+5 (PST)

Peelu Wains (Punjabi: پیلو وینس) is a village and one of the Union Councils (administrative subdivisions) of Khushab District (in Noorpur Thal Tehsil) in the Punjab province of Pakistan.
