= Gunjial Janubi =

Gunjial
- Village and union council
- Location in Pakistan
- Coordinates: 32.329°N 71.905°E
- Country: Pakistan
- Region: Punjab Province
- District: Khushab District
- Time zone: UTC+5 (PST)

Gunjial is a village and one of the 51 Union Councils (administrative subdivisions) there of Khushab District in the Punjab Province of Pakistan.. The village is home to several prominent families and clans, including Taqikhail , Nutqal , Balqal , kaalu khail , panjial, Norykhail , and Syed family, these families from important part of this village's history culture, and community.
