= Waheer =

Waheer وہِير
- Town and union council
- Country: Pakistan
- Region: Punjab Province
- District: Khushab District
- Time zone: UTC+5 (PST)

Waheer (Urdu: وہِير) is a small village and one of the 51 Union Councils (administrative subdivisions) of Khushab District in the Punjab Province of Pakistan.

== Location ==
The village is located on both banks of the Muhajir Branch canal 18 kilometers from Khushab city.

== Population ==
The population of Waheer is about 15,000. Most are farmers, others are in government forces. The area is a major contributor in the armed forces, including Pakistan Air Force, as well as Irrigation, WAPDA and the electronic media. Youth of the village takes pride in being part of the armed forces. The village is inhabited by the Dhudi and Awan tribes.

== Educational facilities ==
It has a Government Boys High School with a capacity of 800 students. The school is situated about 500 meters from the outer fringes of the village to the northwest. Owing to the non-availability of any academic setup in the nearby villages, Government High School Waheer serves as the only education facility for the boys of these villages and that is why it always remains overcrowded. Govt. High school Waheer have a computer lab. In spite of the repeated efforts of the people of Waheer and promises made by the political leaders, the village is still denied of any academic facility for the girls. Consequently, the girls of the village have to travel daily to get education from the nearest Girls High School in Khaliq Abad which is about 5 km from the village.
