= Khoora =

Khoora كهُوڑه
- Village and union council
- Country: Pakistan
- Region: Punjab Province
- District: Khushab District
- Time zone: UTC+5 (PST)

Khoora (Urdu: كهُوڑه), is a village and one of the 51 Union Councils (administrative subdivisions) of Khushab District in the Punjab Province of Pakistan.
