= Katha Saghral =

Coordinates: 32°31′N 72°27′E

Katha Saghral كٹهہ سگهرال
- Village and union council
- Interactive map of Katha Saghral كٹهہ سگهرال
- Country: Pakistan
- District: Khushab District
- Tehsil: Khushab
- Time zone: UTC+5 (PST)

Katha Saghral (Urdu: كٹهہ سگهرال) is a village and union council (an administrative subdivision) of Khushab District located in Punjab, Pakistan.

== Overview ==
Katha Saghral is situated 25 km north from Khushab on the Rawalpindi-Peshawar Road. It is a semi-hilly and mineral-rich area. Dozens of minerals including coal and salt are mined in the surrounding area of the village. The population is largely associated with and/or work in agriculture.
