= Daiwal =

- Village and union council
- Country: Pakistan
- Region: Punjab Province
- District: Khushab District

Government
  - Member of Local Government: Malik Muhammad Khan Awan

Population
  - Village and union council: 45,000
  - Density: 243/km^{2} (630/sq mi)
  - Urban: 14,000
  - Urban density: 353/km^{2} (910/sq mi)
- Time zone: UTC+5 (PST)

Daiwal is a village and one (Union council No. 8) of the 51 Union Councils (administrative subdivision) of Khushab District in the Punjab Province of Pakistan. Daiwal, Mangwal and Jaswal are the main settlements of this union council. It is located at 32°31'60N 72°31'60E.

== Population ==
ACCORDING TO THE 2010 THE POPULATION WAS 25000

year	population
1998	1000
2003	1509

2009 2450
