= Angah, Punjab =

Coordinates: 32°36′N 72°05′E

Anga Shah Bilawal, Punjab انگہ شاہ بلاول
- Village and union council
- Interactive map of Anga Shah Bilawal, Punjab
- Country: Pakistan
- Region: Punjab Province
- District: Khushab District
- Time zone: UTC+5 (PST)
- Postal code: 41140
- Area code: 0454

Anga Shah Bilawal (Punjabi: انگہ) is a village and one of the 51 union councils (administrative subdivisions) of Khushab District in the Punjab Province of Pakistan. It is located at 32° 36' N 72° 5' E.

Anga is the birthplace of noted Urdu writer Ahmed Nadeem Qasmi.
