= Sandral =

Sandral سندرال
- Village and union council
- Location in Pakistan
- Coordinates: 32°21′0″N 72°25′0″E
- Country: Pakistan
- Region: Punjab Province
- District: Khushab District
- Time zone: UTC+5 (PST)

Sandral (Punjabi & Urdu: سندرال) is a village and one of the 51 Union Councils (administrative subdivisions) of Khushab District in the Punjab Province of Pakistan.
