= Nari, Punjab =

- Village and union council
- Country: Pakistan
- Region: Punjab Province
- District: Khushab District
- Time zone: UTC+5 (PST)
- Postal code: 41001
- Area code: 0454

Nari (Urdu: ناڑى), is a village and one of the 51 Union Councils (administrative subdivisions) of Khushab District in the Punjab Province of Pakistan. It is located at 32°28'4N 72°24'32E.

Nari comprises two settlements: Nari Janubi and Nari Shumali. It has a population of approximately 35000. It has a government higher secondary school for boys, and high school for girls and a Basic Health Unit. The village has 5 private schools and 20 mosques.
