= Kund =

Kund Union Council Kund
- Village and union council
- Location in Pakistan
- Coordinates: 32°24′40″N 72°12′17″E
- Country: Pakistan
- Region: Punjab Province
- District: Khushab District
- Tehsil: Khushab
- Time zone: UTC+5 (PST)
- Postal Code: 41001

Kund is a village and one of the 51 Union Councils (administrative subdivisions) of Khushab District in the Punjab Province of Pakistan. It is located at 32°24'40N 72°12'17E.
