= Chak No.50/Mb =

Chak No. 50/MB چک نمبر ايم بى/50
- Village and union council
- Country: Pakistan
- Region: Punjab Province
- District: Khushab District
- Time zone: UTC+5 (PST)

Chak 50/MB (Urdu: چک نمبر ايم بى/50), is a village and one of the 51 Union Councils (administrative subdivisions) of Khushab District in the Punjab province of Pakistan. It is located at 32°10'0N 72°52'20E.
