= Khabaki =

- Village and union council
- Interactive map of Khabaki
- Country: Pakistan
- Region: Punjab Province
- District: Khushab District
- Time zone: UTC+5 (PST)

Khabaki is a village and one of the 51 Union Councils (administrative subdivisions) of Khushab District in the Punjab Province of Pakistan. It is located at 32°37'0N 72°13'60E, near the similarly named Khabikki Lake.
