= Bijar, Punjab =

Ukhli Mohla Janubi, Punjab
- Village and union council
- Country: Pakistan
- Region: Punjab Province
- District: Khushab District
- Time zone: UTC+5 (PST)

Ukhli Mohla Janubi is a village 1821 and one of the 51 Union Councils (administrative subdivisions) of Khushab District in the Punjab Province of Pakistan. It is located on an important junction from where roads lead in all four directions. Mitha Tiwana is located to the east, Sheikhu to the west, Panja to the south and Ukhli Mohla Janubi Stop (former Nawab de Kothi) National Highway (Mianwali-Sargodha Road) to the north.

The village is divided into two parts, Janoobi Ukhli and consists of the village and Shumali Ukhli Mohla the dwellings of the people working on agriculture lands.

== Location ==
It is located at 32°15'24N 72°3'15
