= Botala =

Botala بوتالہ
- Village and union council
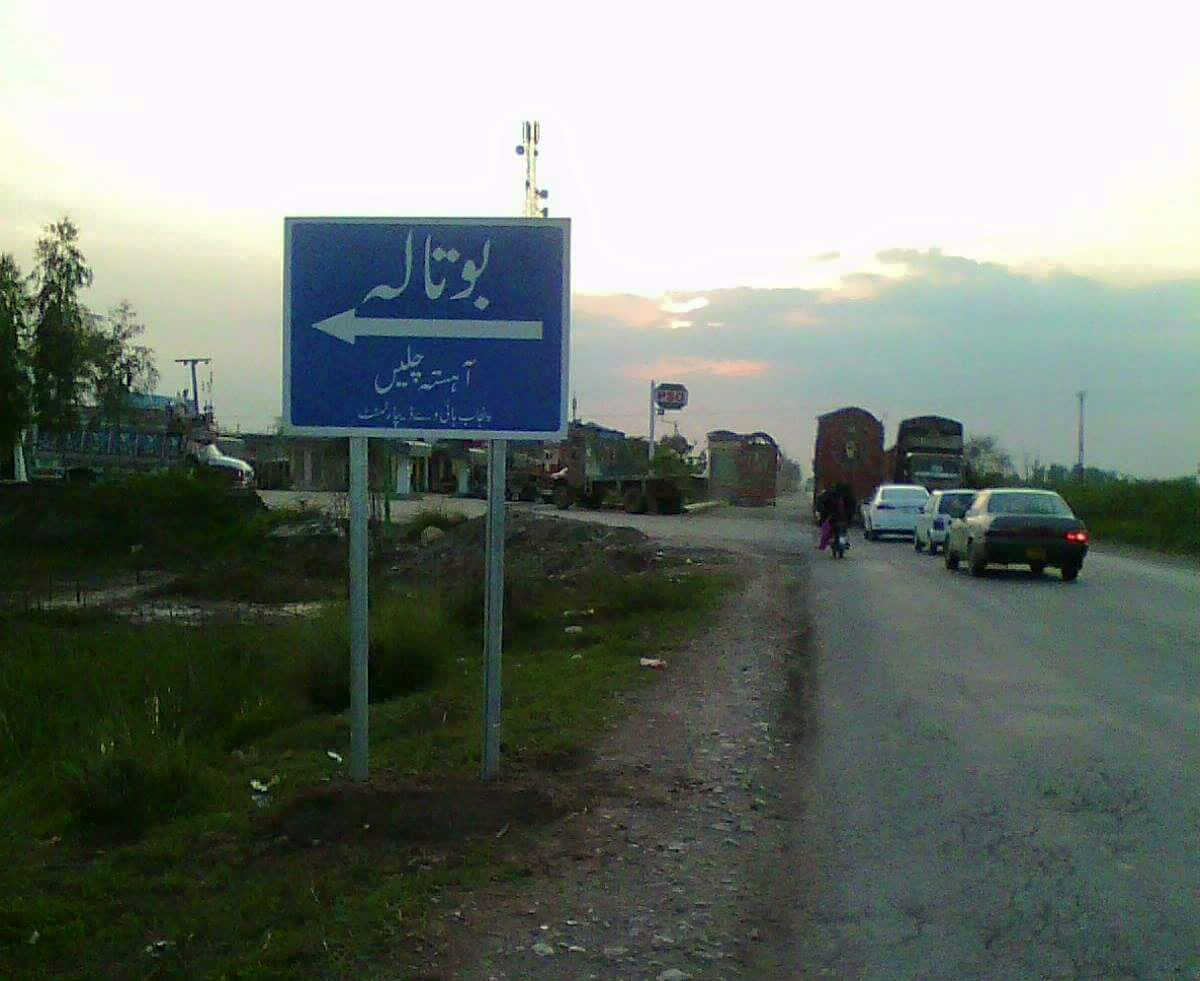
- Country: Pakistan
- Region: Punjab Province
- District: Khushab District

Population
  - Total: 36,000
- Time zone: UTC+5 (PST)
- Postal code: 41251

Botala (Urdu: بوتالہ) is a village and one of the 51 Union Councils of Khushab District in the Punjab Province of Pakistan. It is situated 2.0 km south of the main Mianwali-Lahore Road. It is about 12 kilometers from the district headquarters Jauahrabad and 60 kilometers from divisional headquarters Sargodha.

== Areas ==
- Area: about 10,000 acres (40 km^{2}).
- Sub Areas: Pindi, Jhugi Manday Wali, Handan Wala, Balkian Aala Boad, Neher Pul Jabbi
- Different parts of the agricultural areas of the village: Tapian, Gada Maar, Jhugi Manday Wali, Hadan Wala, Shero, Kamoon

== Population ==
Population is about 36,000.

== Geography ==
The land of the village is fertile, 98% of which is irrigated and 2% desert.

== Economy ==
- Crops: The major crops of Botala are sugarcane, rice and wheat.
- Canal and irrigation system: There are 5 major canals in Botala and hundreds of water courses carry water from these canals.
- Deserts: The great Thal Desert starts from Botala and its native town Hadali as well.

== PICS Gallery ==
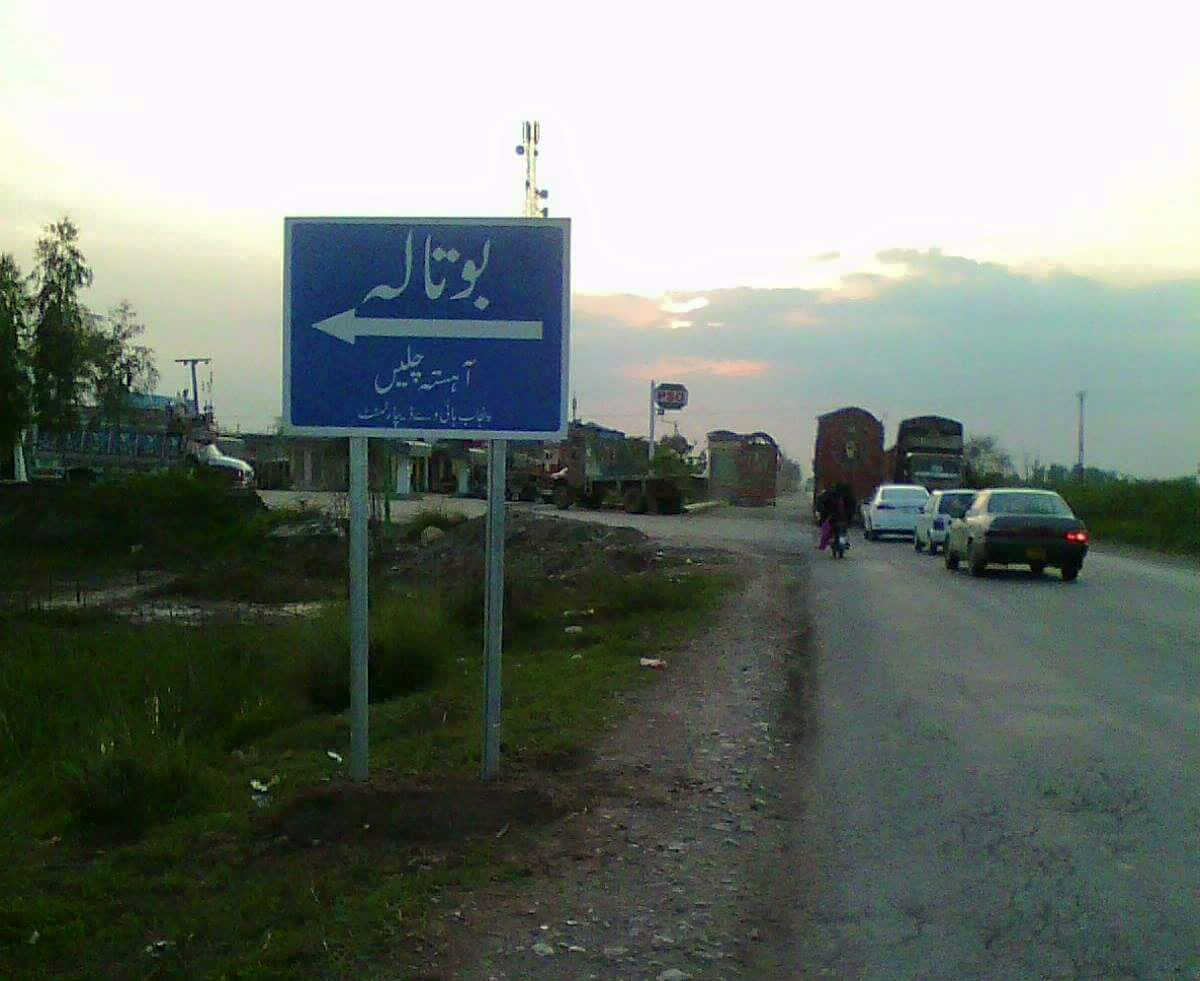
Botala, Khushab

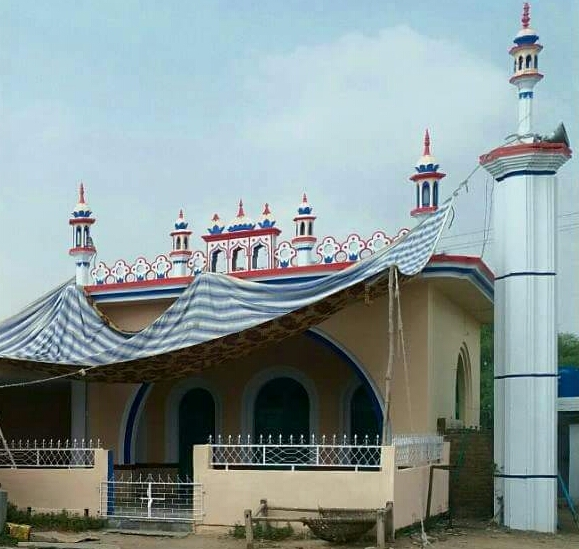
Mosque at Botala Adda

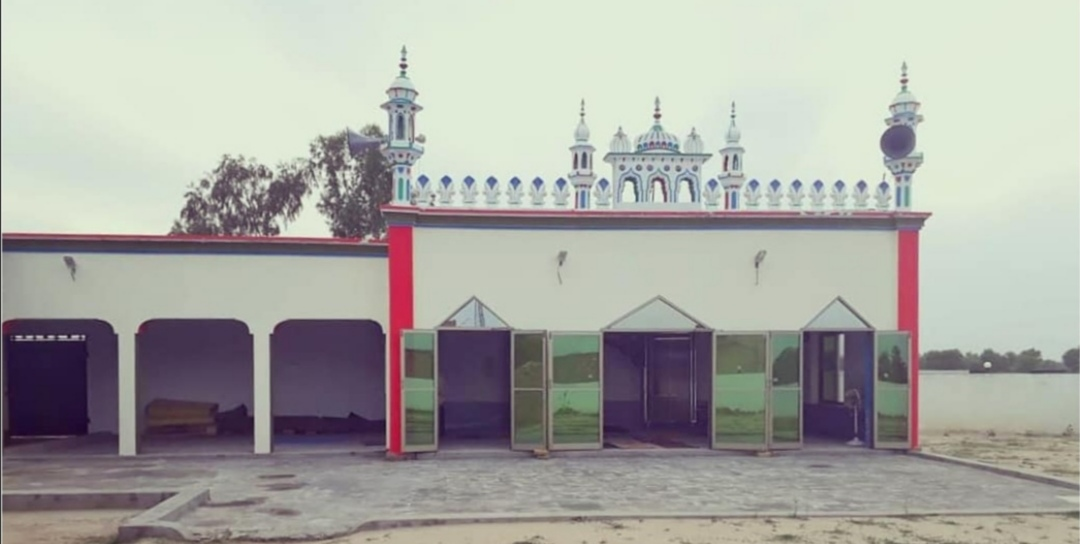

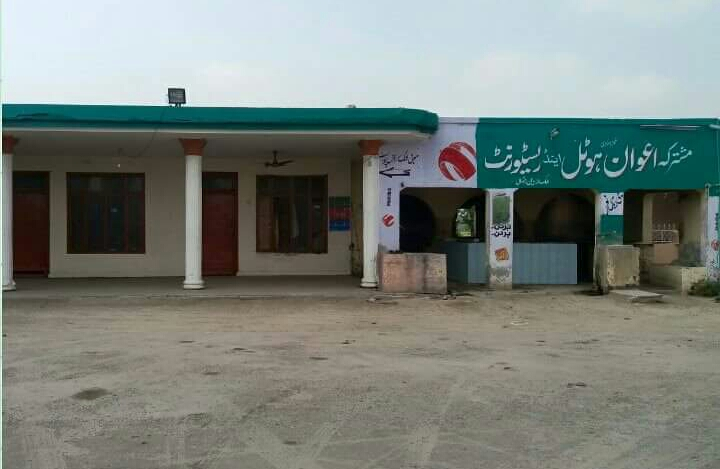
Hotel at Botala Adda

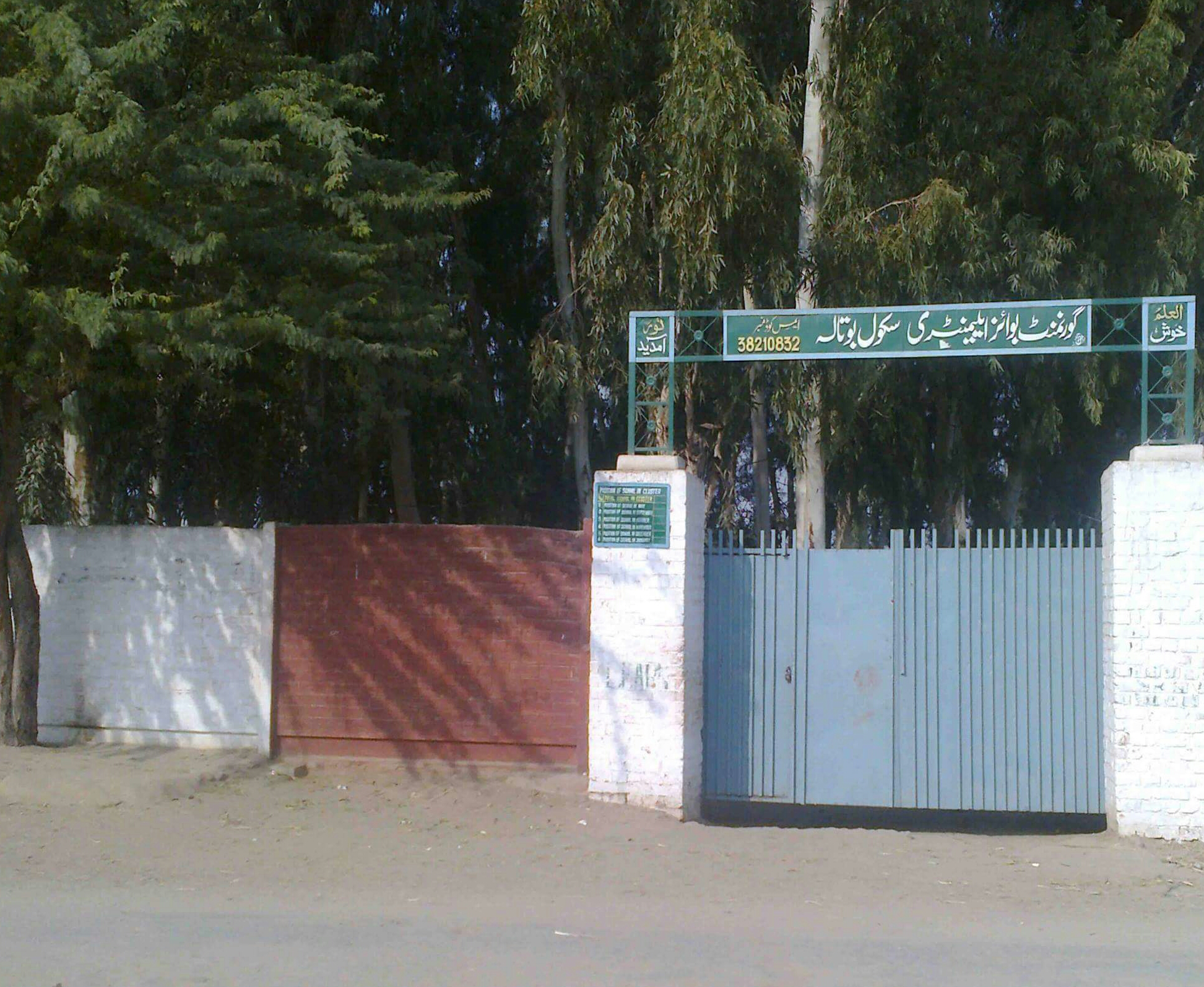
Govt Elementary School for Boys, Botala

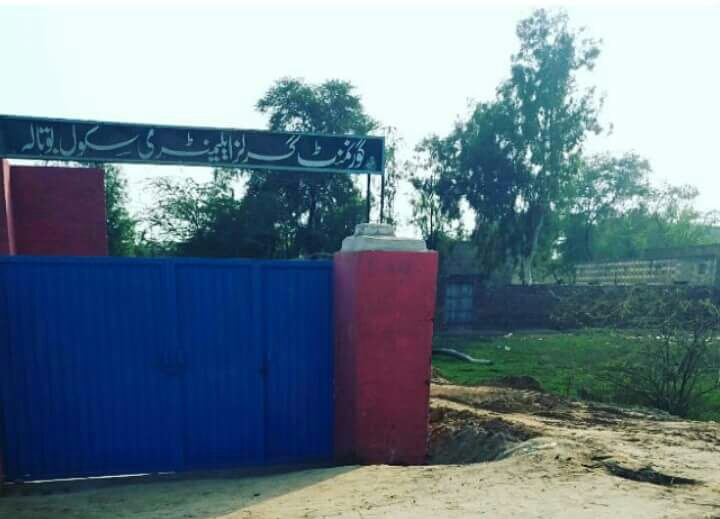
Govt Elementary School for Girls, Botala

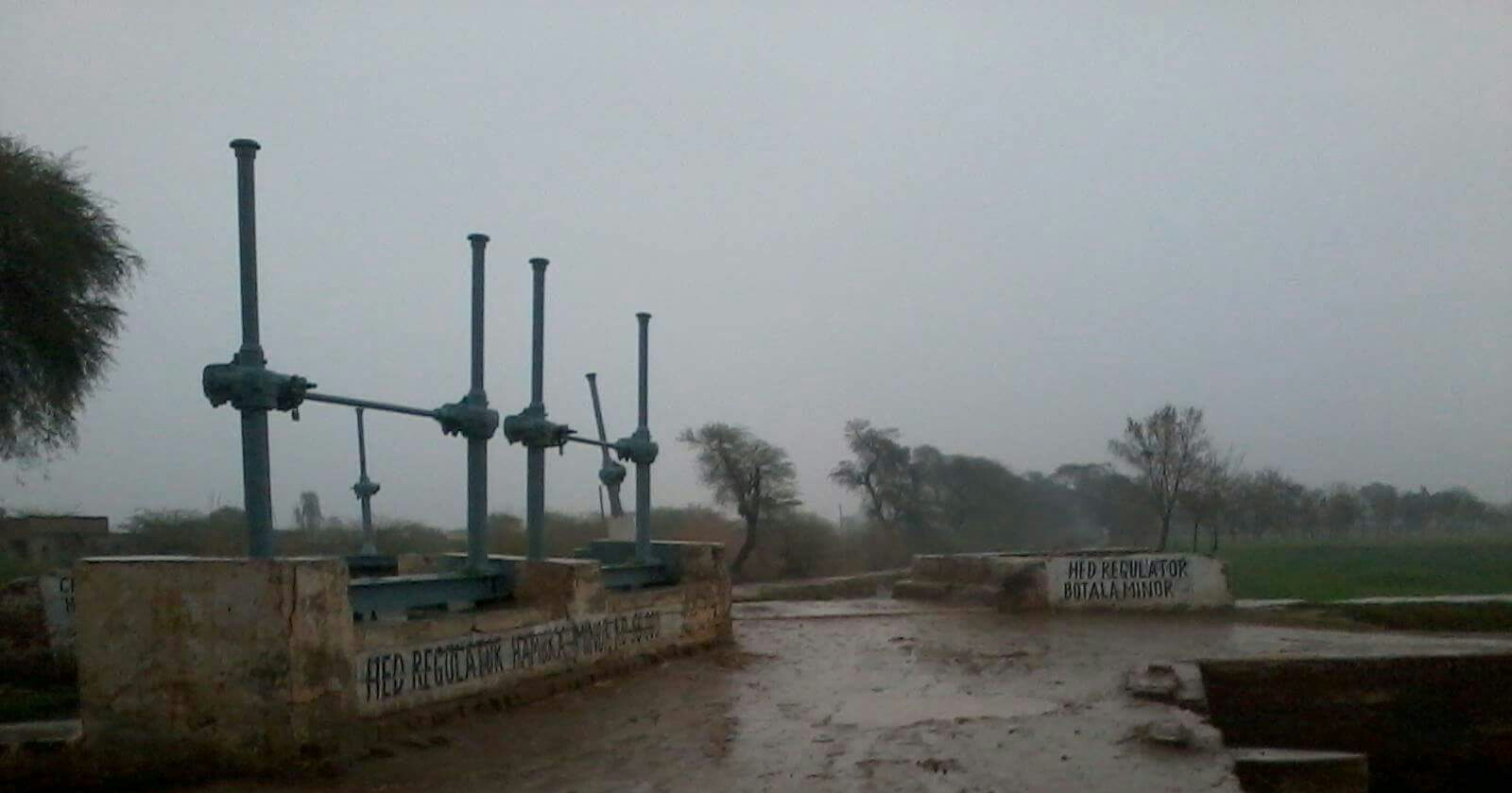
Head, Botala

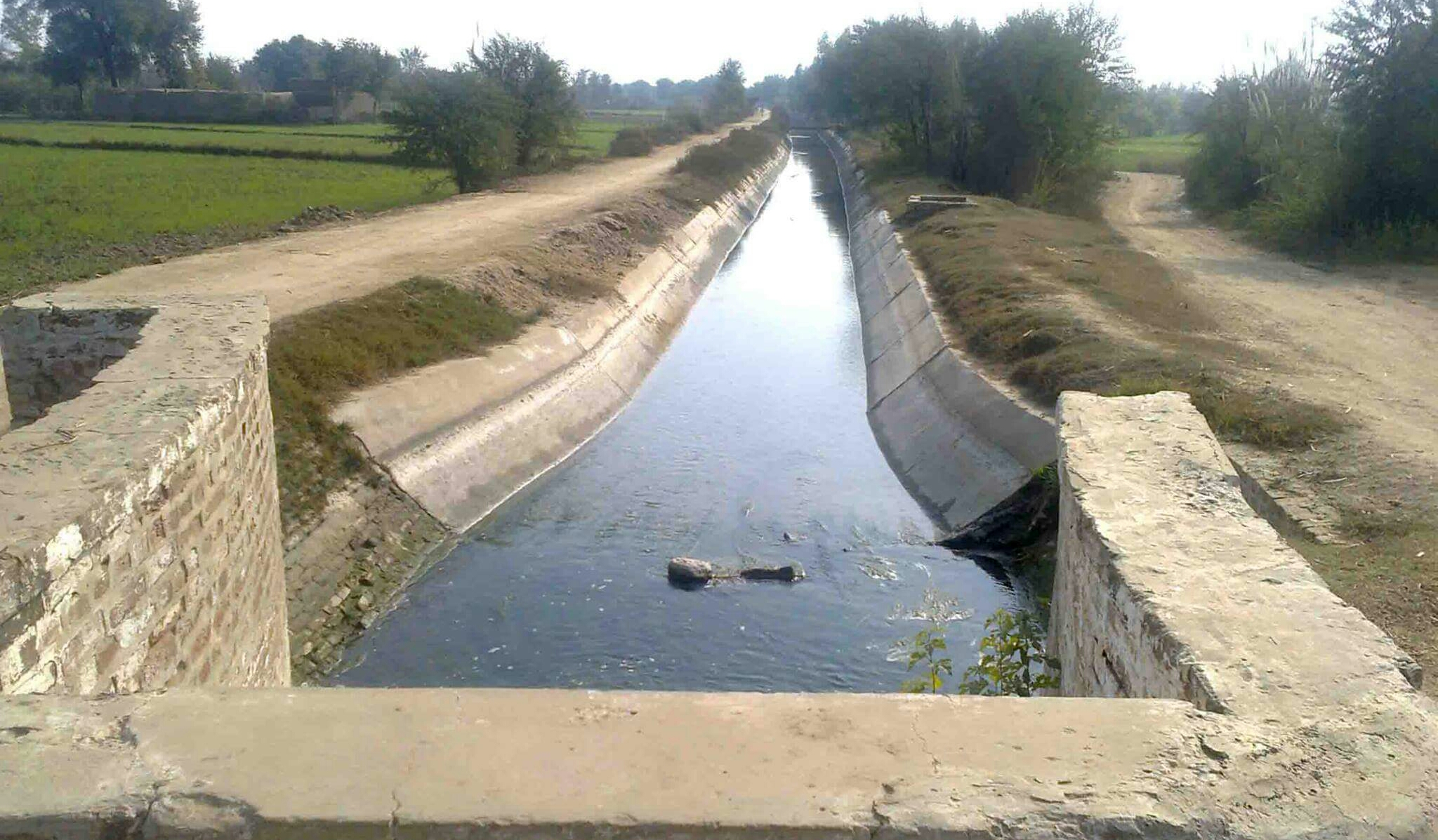
Botala Minor Canal

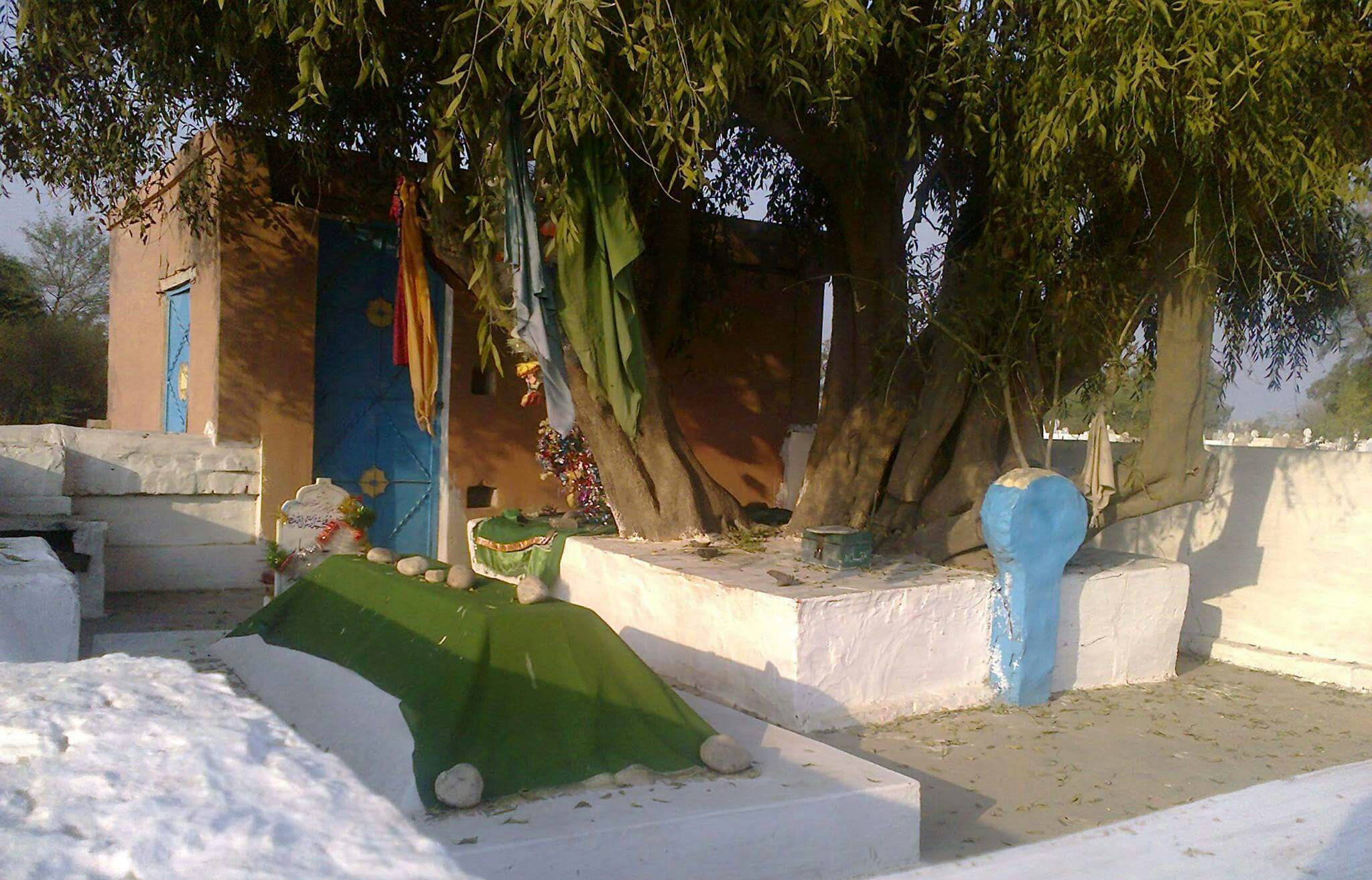
Darbar Baba Qamer Ali, Botala

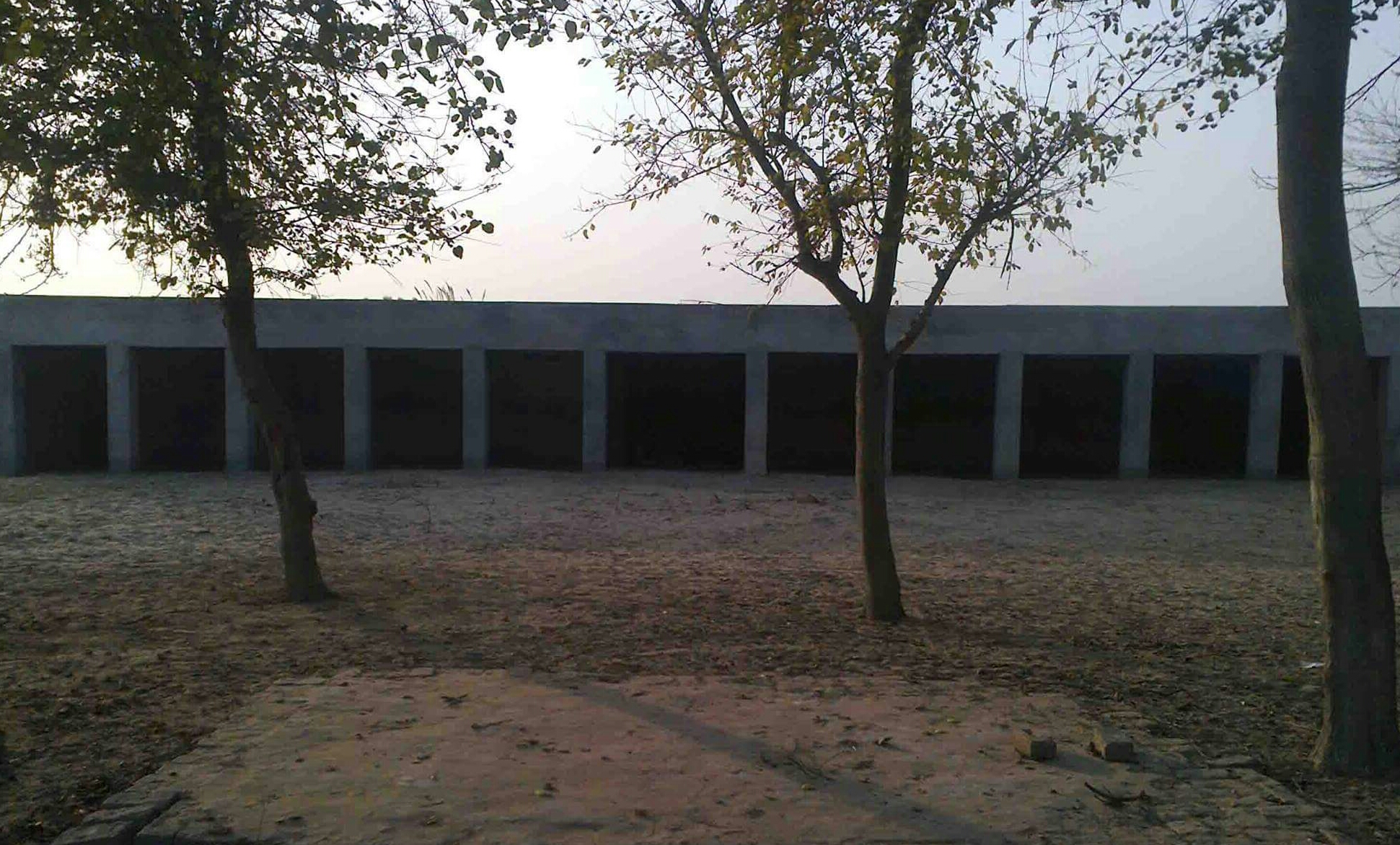
Janazgah, Botala

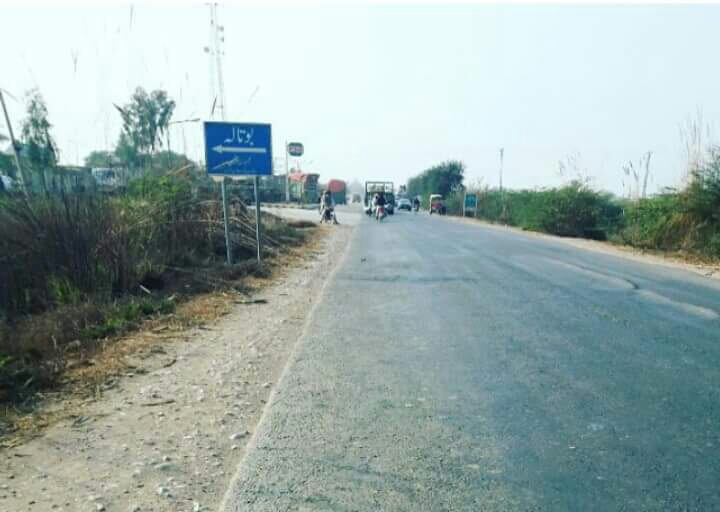
View of Botala Adda

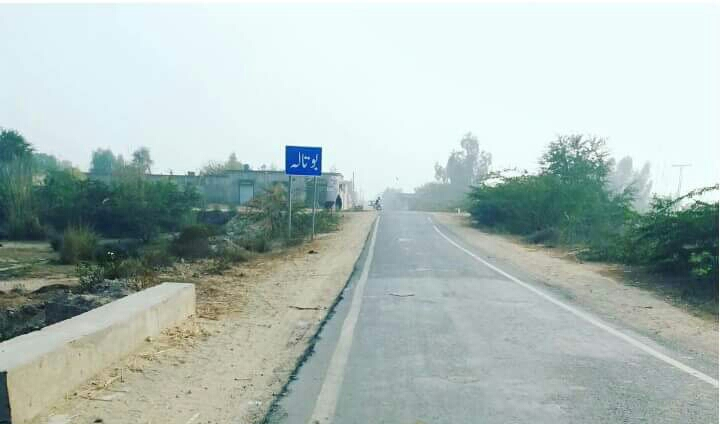
Botala Entrance

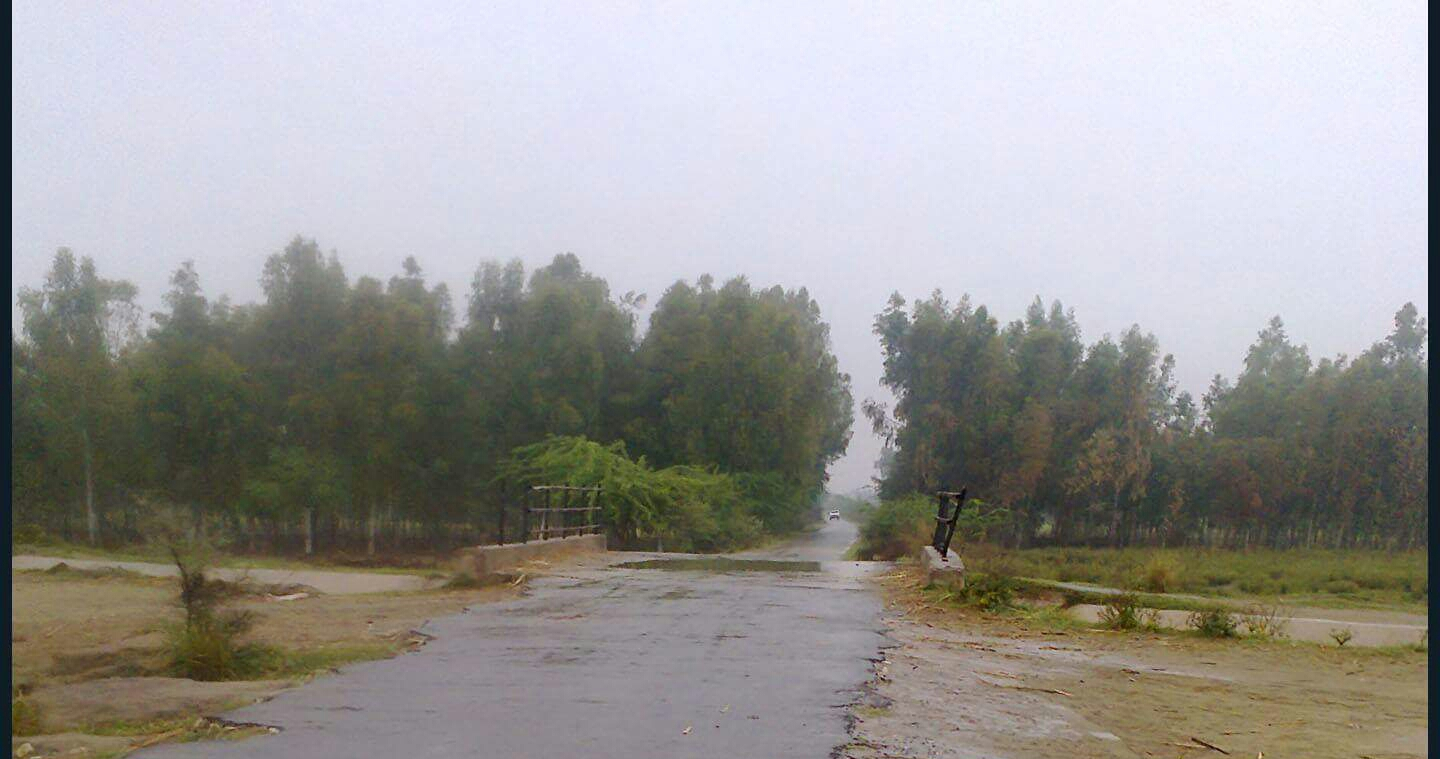
Botala-42 Chak road

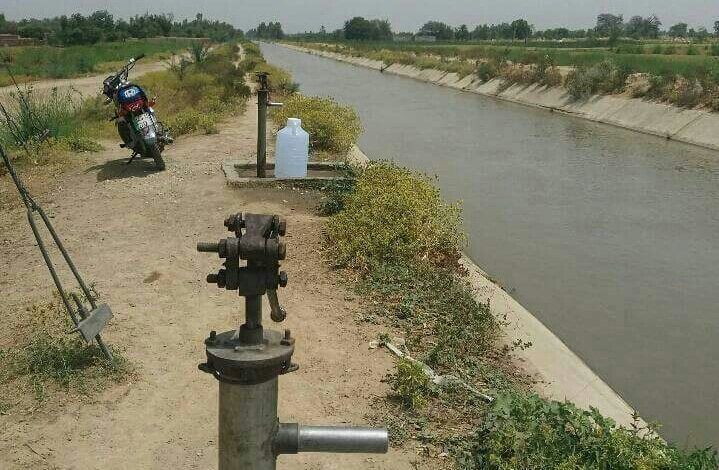
Loc. Near Govt Boys School

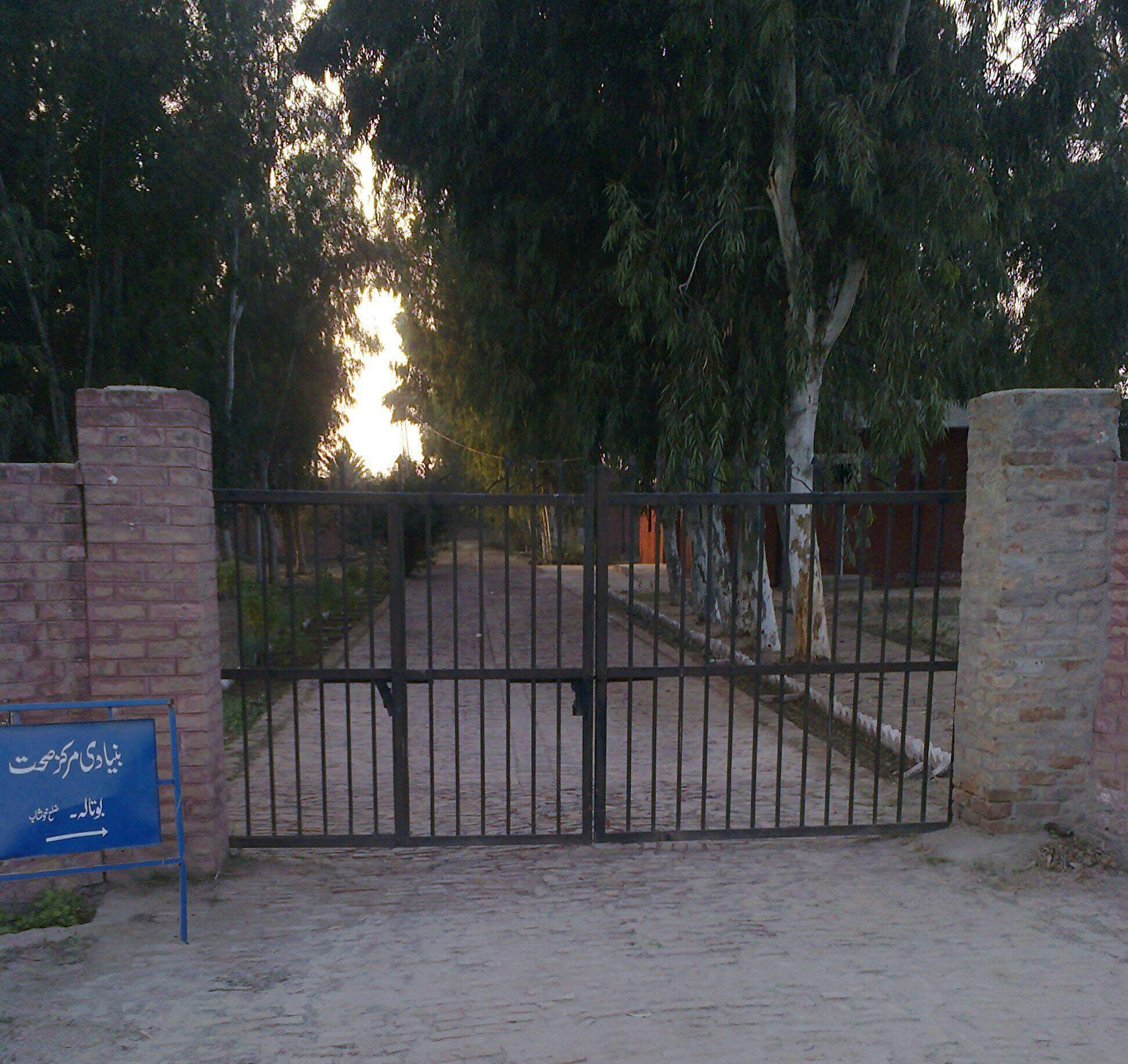
Basic Health Unit

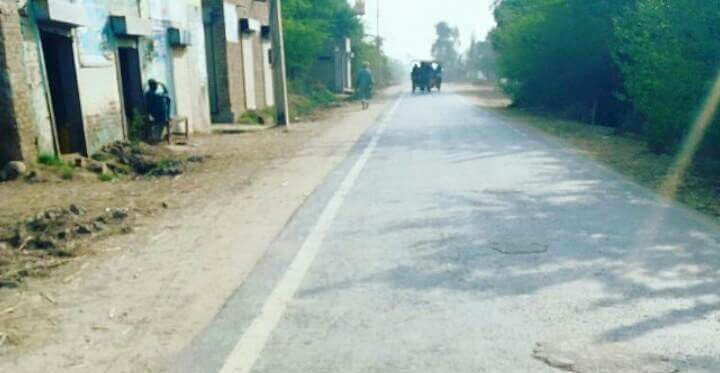
Pindi, Botala

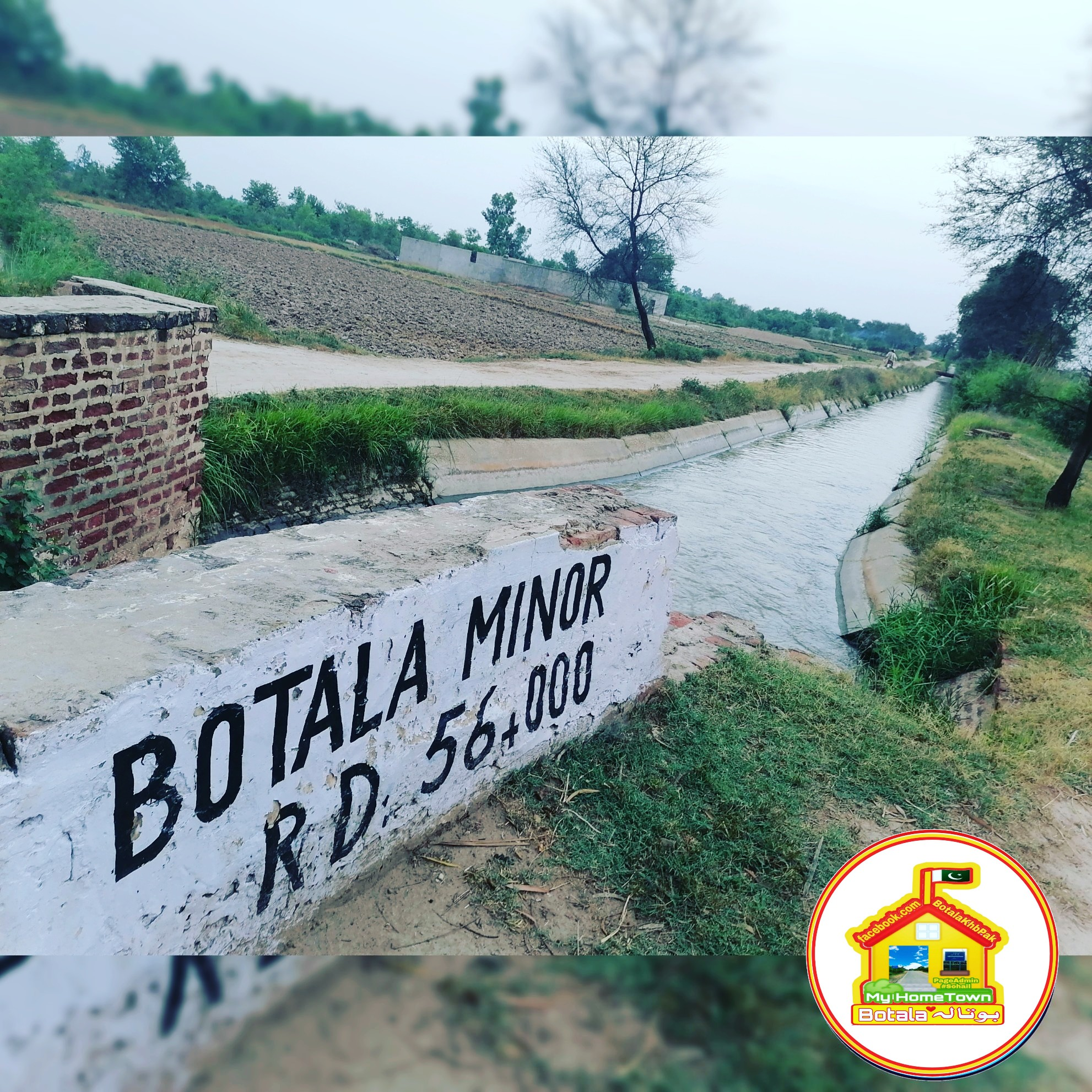
بوتالہ نہر
