= Nali Shumali =

Coordinates: 32°29′N 72°19′E

Nali Shumali نلّى شُمالى
- Village and union council
- Interactive map of Nali Shumali نلّى شُمالى
- Country: Pakistan
- Region: Punjab Province
- District: Khushab District
- Time zone: UTC+5 (PST)

Nali Shumali (Urdu: نلّى شُمالى) is a village and one of the 51 Union Councils (administrative subdivisions) of Khushab District in the Punjab Province of Pakistan. It is located at 32°29'17N 72°19'26E.

Nali Shumali is among the more populous villages of district Khushab, with a population of 30,000. There are many mines of coal, silica and other minerals. Access to clean drinking water is the main problem in the village. This village is dominated by the Awan tribe,all main clans which are living in Nali are offspring of Great warrior of the Era and Brave person of subcontinent Malik Chot Awan . All tribes of Nali are basically Chotaal which are further divided in to main clans being Sangal, Dalyal, Siwal, Chotaal, Ballah and Kandan. A Sufi saint, Mian Muhammad Azeem Bundi, is buried here.Baba Badshahan Sarkar, Mian Bodla are also buried in this village. Some Ashaba Kiram is buried here.
