= Utra Janubi =

Uttra اُترا جنُوبى
- Village and union council
- Country: Pakistan
- Region: Punjab Province
- District: Khushab District

Government
- Time zone: UTC+5 (PST)

Utra Janubi (Urdu: اُترا جنُوبى) is a village and one of the 51 Union Councils (administrative subdivisions) of Khushab District in the Punjab Province of Pakistan. This village gets its name from the Uttra tribe, whose members constitute the bulk of the village's population.
