= Uchalli =

Uchhali اُوچهالى
- Village and union council
- Interactive map of Uchhali
- Country: Pakistan
- Region: Punjab Province
- District: Khushab District
- Time zone: UTC+5 (PST)

Uchhali (Urdu: اُوچهالى) is a village and one of the 51 Union Councils (administrative subdivisions) of Khushab District in the Punjab Province of Pakistan. The Union Council includes the Uchhali Wetlands Complex located at 72°14'E, 32° 29'N, which has been the focus of conservation activities.
