= Kufri, Khushab =

Kufri, Pakistan کُفرى Siddiqabad صِدّيق آباد
- Village and union council
- Country: Pakistan
- Region: Punjab Province
- District: Khushab District
- Time zone: UTC+5 (PST)

Kufri (Urdu: کُفرى) is a village and Union Council (administrative subdivisions) of Khushab District in the Punjab Province of Pakistan. The name of village Kufri was changed in 2009 to Siddiqabad (Urdu: صِدّيق آباد). The village is located near the main Naushera- Sakesar Road. The village is surrounded by the mountains of Salt Range. Other villages in its surrounding are Uchalli, Mardawal, Nowshera, etc. The most Population is Qutbshahi Awan. The main castes are Shehal, Mirwal, Kondi, Ardal etc. The oldest tree, almost 200 years old, is a Peepal near Peepal Wali Masjid.

Notable people

Mansoor Usman Awan, Attorney General for Pakistan is from Kufri

Munshi Allah Baksh, a well known teacher in Soon Valley, used to live in Kufri. He died in 1978.
