= Hassanpur Tiwana =

Town in Punjab, Pakistan

Hassanpur Tiwana is a village and one of the 51 Union Councils (administrative subdivisions) of Khushab District in the Punjab Province of Pakistan.
