= Quaidabad =

Quaidabad قائِد آباد
- City
- Location in Pakistan
- Coordinates: 32°20′N 71°55′E
- Country: Pakistan
- Province: Punjab
- District: Khushab
- Tehsil: Quaidabad
- Time zone: UTC+5 (PST)

Quaidabad (Punjabi, Urdu: قائِدآباد), is a city and tehsil (administrative subdivision) of Khushab District in the Punjab, Pakistan. It is located in northwest Punjab, 283 kilometers from Islamabad and 295 kilometers from Lahore. It is located on the main Lahore-Mianwali Road, 90 kilometers from Sargodha and 40 kilometers from Khushab. It was founded by Sardar Abdur Rab Nishtar in 1951, and named after the Quaid-e-Azam (the founder of Pakistan).

It is the location of the famous Warcha salt mine. It has road links to the sandy agricultural area of Thal and with the mountain of Soon Valley. It is part of National Assembly constituency NA-94 and Provincial Assembly of Punjab constituency PP-82.

== History ==
Most of Muslim rulers who attacked Indo-Pak from Afghanistan used this route to access Delhi. Famous Gernaylee Road also passes from this city. Before partition, this area was under British rule. During British rule, Khushab was a tehsil of the old Shahpur District. The predominantly Muslim population supported Muslim League and Quaid-e-Azam during Pakistan Movement.

== Demography ==
Most of the population are farmers; about 85% of the population live in villages and only 15% live in the municipal urban area. But the trend is shifting and people are moving to the urban area.

== Economy ==
Agriculture is important to the local economy, particularly the growing of rice, wheat, black gram which is consumed all over Pakistan and exported around the world. The grain market of Quaidabad is one of the famous grain markets in Punjab particularly for rice trading. Overseas people also contribute much in the economy especially the people of Goleywali.

== Industry ==
Before 90s Quaid Abad was famous due to Quaidabad carpets - Quaidabad woolen mill which is now just a tract of plain land after privatization. Currently, the industry of Quaidabad is primarily agro-based. The main industries include rice mills, poultry sheds and salt processing units.

== Climate ==
The temperature of Quaid Abad reaches highs of 50 °C in summer and lows of 0 °C in winter. The soil of the suburbs is fertile due to irrigation by Mahajir Branch. It is a part of citrus land, so fruit like malta grow here. This tehsil also has unusual geography of dry mountains on one side and sandy soil in another corner.

== Famous places ==
Famous places to see here include the Warcha salt mine located at Rukhla Mandi. The beautiful Soon Sakeser valley is very near to it . "Amb Shareef" is also a famous place of Quaidabad Tehsil.

== Sports ==
Major sports : Cricket and volleyball

Others : Football, Hockey, Badminton

== Administration ==
Quaid Abad Tehsil is subdivided into 12 Union Councils.

BANDIAL Bijar Chak No.14/Mb Goleywali Gunjial Janubi Okhali Mohlah Quaidabad Utra Janubi Warcha Gunjial Shumali Choaa Panja

== Colleges & Universities ==
Quaid Abad houses few Government colleges. These include:

Colleges:

1. Govt. Degree College for Boys, 2. Govt. Degree College for Women, 3. PunjabCollege for boys & girls, 4. Superior group for boys & girls 5. Al-Hira College of Technology 6. The Reader group of colleges

Famous Schools :

(Private schools)

2

1. Edutop High school
1. Dar-e-Arqam High School
2. The Scholars High School,
3. The Arqam high School
4. Allied high School,
5. Al Syed High School
6. Al-Noor Public School
7. Al-Noor and Shaheer Web & IT Center
