= Jauharabad =

Jauharabad جَوہرآباد
- City
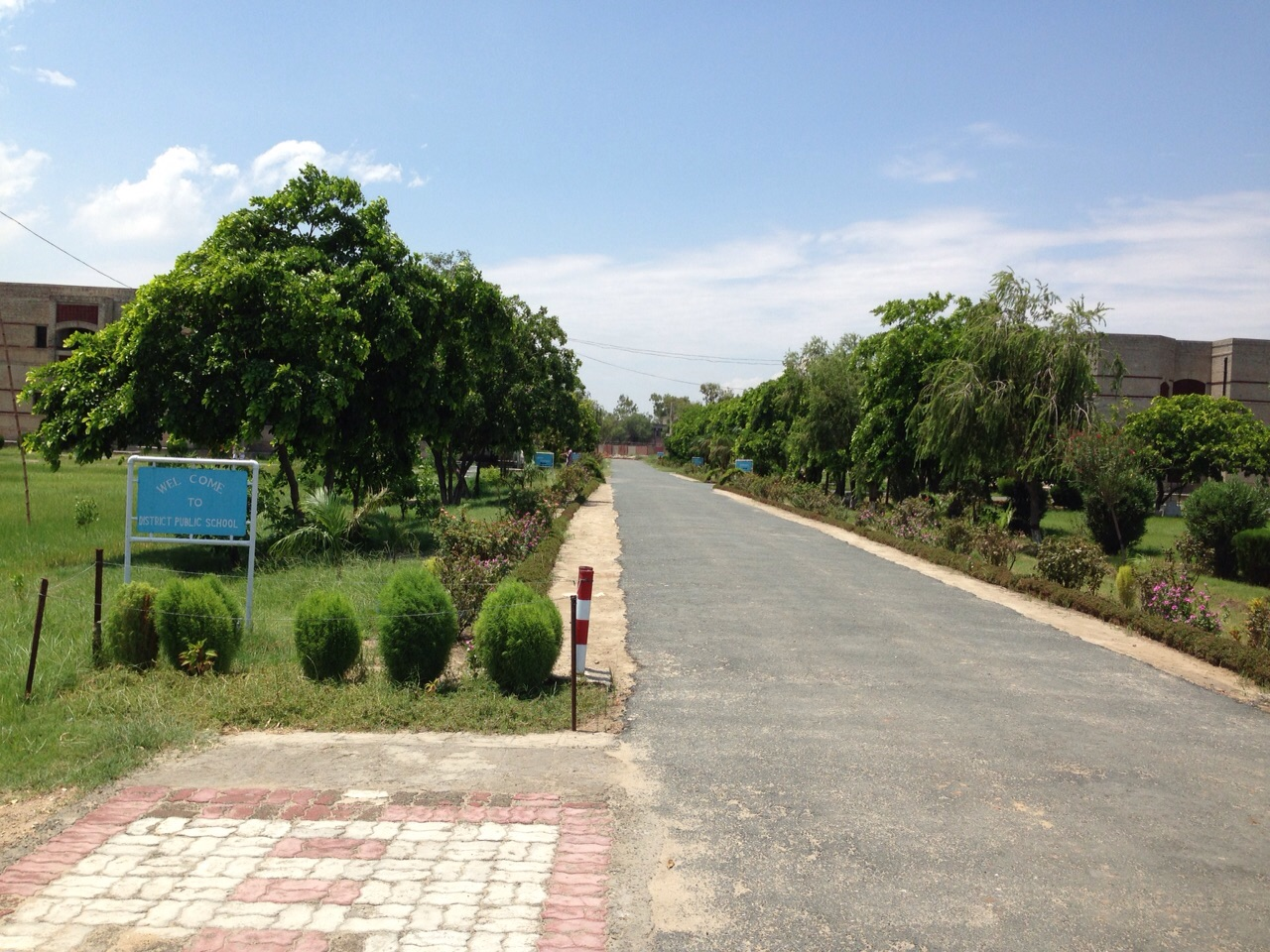
- District Public School & Inter College of Jauharabad

- Location within Punjab, Pakistan Location within Pakistan
- Coordinates: 32°17′31″N 72°16′25″E
- Country: Pakistan
- Province: (Punjab, Pakistan) Punjab
- Division: Sargodha
- District: Khushab

Government
  - Type: Municipal Committee
  - Chairman: Vacant
  - Sub-Chairman: Vacant

Population (2023)
  - City: 113,188
  - Rank: 113th in Pakistan
- Time zone: UTC+5 (PST)
- Calling code: 0454
- Number of Union Councils: 6

Jauharabad (Punjabi/Urdu: جَوہر آباد, romanized: jauhar ābād; Punjabi pronunciation: [ˈd͡ʒɔː˥˩ʱᵊɾäːˌbäːd̪ᵊ]; Urdu pronunciation: [ˈd͡ʒɔːɦəɾɑːˌbɑːd̪]) is the headquarters of Khushab District in the Punjab province of Pakistan.

== Etymology ==
The Urdu word 'Jauhar' translates to 'gem' in English, but the city was named in honour of the renowned Pakistani freedom activist, Maulana Mohammad Ali Jauhar.

== History ==
The foundation of Jauharabad was laid in 1951 and completed in 1953, and developed under a master plan to serve as the new federal capital of Pakistan due to its central location until Ayub Khan eventually replaced it with Islamabad. It began serving as the district headquarters when Khushab was carved out of Sargodha as a new district.

The famous Islamic thinker, scholar and Jewish convert to Islam, Muhammad Asad (formerly Leopold Weiss) — author of The Road to Mecca, The Message of the Qur'an and Principles of State and Government in Islam, stayed at Jauharabad in the 1950s. He resided at the bungalow of the town's prominent resident, Chaudhry Niaz Ali Khan; who on the advice of Allama Muhammad Iqbal, had established the Dar ul Islam Trust Institutes first in Pathankot, India, after Pakistan's independence, in Jauharabad.

The city houses Khushab Nuclear Complex and Pakistan Air Force Base Sakesar.

== Geography ==
Jauharabad lies at the confluence of the Thal Desert and the Pothohar Plateau in flat agricultural territory immediately south of the Salt Range, which marks the end of the Pothohar Plateau and the start of the Punjab plains. The Jhelum River passes 7 km southeast of Jauharabad and to the south of Jauharabad lies the Thal Desert. To the east of Jauharabad is the Khushab Reserve Forest, spread over approximately 4 km^{2}.

== Demographics ==
=== Population ===
Historical population
Year	Pop.	±%
1961	8,189	—
1972	14,681	+79.3%
1981	18,742	+27.7%
1998	40,175	+114.4%
2017	91,357	+127.4%
2023	113,188	+23.9%

Languages

Languages of Jauharabad MC (2023 Census)
1. Punjabi (93.8%)
2. Urdu (3.80%)
3. Pashto (1.40%)
4. Others (1.00%)
