= Noorpur Thal =

Noorpur Thal تحصِيل نُورپُورتهل
- Tehsil
- Interactive map of Noorpur Thal
- Country: Pakistan
- Province: Punjab
- District: Khushab

Government
  - Chairman: Rao Muhammad Alam
- Time zone: UTC+5 (PST)

Noorpur Thal Tehsil (Punjabi : تحصیل نُور پُور تھل) is a Tehsil (an administrative subdivision) of Khushab District in the Punjab province of Pakistan. The city of Noorpur Thal is the headquarters of the tehsil which is administratively subdivided into 10 Union Councils. It comprises a part of the Thal desert.

The majority religion is Islam, and Punjabi is the native language of 94.6% of the population.
