= Khushab =

Khushab خُوشاب
- City
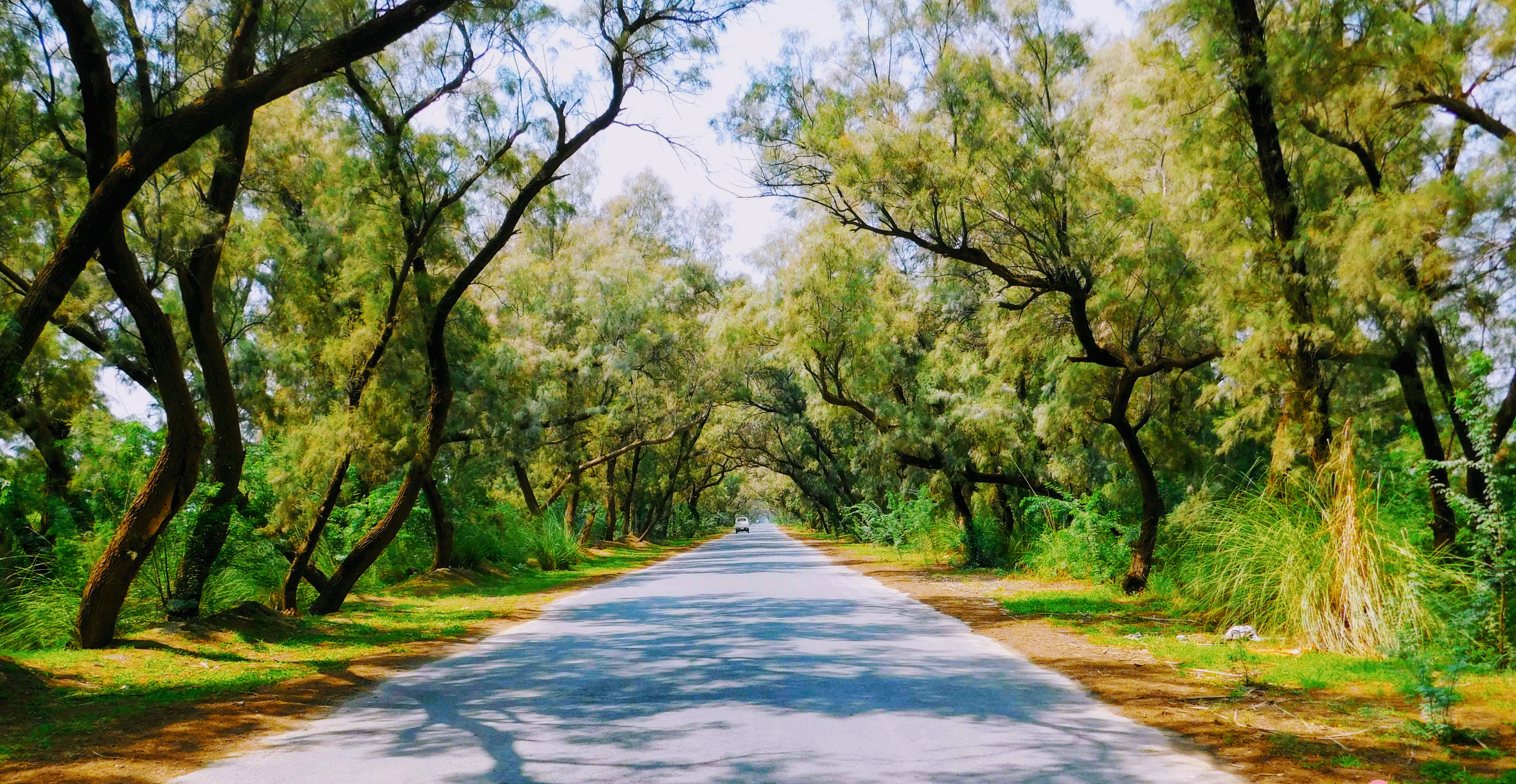
- Khushab Road

- Location of Khushab Khushab (Pakistan)
- Coordinates: 32°17′55″N 72°21′3″E
- Country: Pakistan
- Province: (Punjab, Pakistan) Punjab
- Division: Sargodha
- District: Khushab

Government
  - Type: Municipal Committee
  - Administrator: Qazi Ahmed Sohaib
  - Chief Officer: Usman Ghani

Population (2023)
  - City: 139,905
  - Rank: 85th in Pakistan
- Time zone: UTC+5 (PST)
  - Summer (DST): UTC+6
- Area code: 0454
- Website: www.khushab.gop.pk
- Khushab Official Website

Khushab (Punjabi: خُوشاب) is a city in Khushab District, Sargodha Division, in the Punjab province of Pakistan. The city also serves as the headquarters of Khushab Tehsil, an administrative subdivision of the Khushab District. It is the 85th most populous city of Pakistan.

The city of Khushab is the location of the Khushab Nuclear complex, a critical part of Pakistan's Special Weapons Programme.

== Demographics ==
Population

Historical population
Year	Pop.	±% p.a.
1951	20,476	—
1961	24,851	+1.96%
1972	43,391	+5.20%
1981	56,274	+2.93%
1998	87,859	+2.66%
2017	119,384	+1.63%
2023	139,905	+2.68%

According to the 2023 census, Khushab had a population of 139,905. The population, according to the 1901 census, was 11,403.

Languages

Languages of Khushab MC (2023 Census)
1. Punjabi (94.5%)
2. Urdu (3.50%)
3. Pashto (1.70%)
4. Others (0.30%)

== Etymology ==
"Khushab" is a combination of two Persian words: khush (Persian: خُوش), meaning "sweet or tasty", and aab (Persian: آب), meaning "water". A common belief is that the Persians from the west first used the word khush-aab in admiration of the sweet and tasty water found in the historical city situated on the bank of Jhelum River. In time the city became known as Khushab.

== Ecosystem ==
=== Olive cultivation ===
According to local farmers in Pakistan, there is untapped potential in olive cultivation and oil production, which could reduce the country's reliance on imported edible oil. The region of Punjab is most suitable for olive cultivation, with wild olives found abundantly in several areas. However, for good yields, modern irrigation systems, proper drainage, and adequate fertilizers are required. Additionally, specific varieties of the plant such as Ottobratica, Coratina, Frantoio, Leccino, and Mirailo, best for olive oil extraction and commercial production, should be planted.

=== Plantation drive ===
The Capital Development Authority planned to plant 5,000 saplings in Islamabad on Independence Day in accordance with the Clean and Green Pakistan campaign. Various areas were allocated a different number of saplings to plant, and citizens, students, and organizations participated in the plantation drive. The Metropolitan Corporation Islamabad also planted 1,000 saplings across the city. This initiative aimed to increase Pakistan's forest cover and mitigate the effects of climate change.

== Development projects ==
In October 2022, Pakistani government approved over Pkr 10 billion for the execution of various uplift projects in the country's different districts, including water supply schemes, the construction of small dams, the rehabilitation of schools and other development projects. The funds were allocated during the National Economic Council meeting, which was chaired by the Prime Minister. The government aims to complete these projects on a priority basis to ensure the socio-economic development of the country.

=== Jalalpur Canal ===
In the beginning of 2023, the Punjab Irrigation Department aimed to complete the repair and extension work of Jalalpur Canal, a water source for domestic and irrigation purposes in Jhelum, within six months. The canal's extension would provide more than 4,000 acres of land to farmers for irrigation purposes. To speed up the work, the government approved the allocation of Rs. 200 million to the department.

=== Bauxite reserves ===
The government of Pakistan approved a plan to extract bauxite reserves and utilize them to bolster the country's industrial sector and foreign reserves. A memorandum of understanding had been signed between the government and a Chinese company for the mining and processing of bauxite reserves in the country's southern region. This move is expected to create job opportunities and promote industrial development, helping to stabilize Pakistan's economy.

== Notable people ==
- Sultan Khan, chess grandmaster
- Shah Maroof Khushabi, Sufi Saint
- Idris Azad, philosopher, poet, fiction writer, and journalist.
- Wasif Ali Wasif, scholar, poet, and religious mentor.
- Satya Pal Wahi, former chairman of the Oil and Natural Gas Corporation of India
