= Khushab District =

District in Punjab, Pakistan

Khushab ضِلع خُوشاب
- District of Punjab
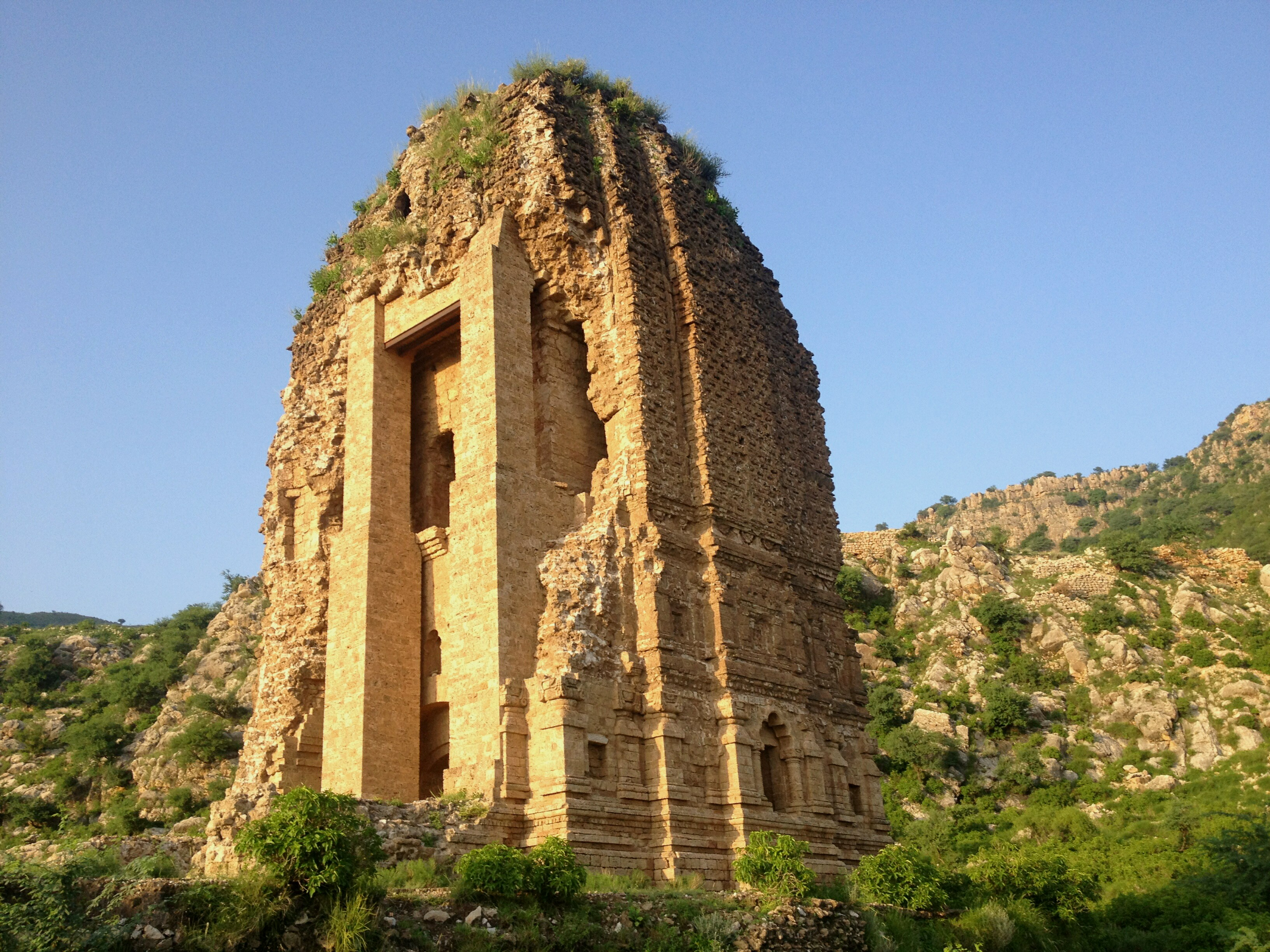
- Amb Temples

- Khushab District highlighted within Punjab Province
- Country: Pakistan
- Province: Punjab
- Division: Sargodha Division
- Established: 2 July 1982
- Headquarters: Jauharabad

Government
  - Type: District Administration
  - Deputy Commissioner: Dr. Farvah Aamir (PAS)
  - District Police Officer: Touqeer Muhammad Naeem
  - Additional Deputy Commissioner (Revenue): Adeel Haider PAS

Area
  - District of Punjab: 6,511 km^{2} (2,514 sq mi)

Population (2023)
  - District of Punjab: 1,501,089
  - Density: 230.5/km^{2} (597/sq mi)
  - Urban: 418,745
  - Rural: 1,082,344

Literacy
  - Literacy rate: Total: (62.52%); Male: (75.59%); Female: (49.03%)
- Time zone: UTC+5 (PST)
- Area code: 0454
- Number of Tehsils: 4
- Main language: Punjabi
- Website: khushab.punjab.gov.pk

Khushab District (Punjabi: ضِلع خُوشاب) is a district in the province of Punjab, Pakistan, with its administrative capital in Jauharabad. The district is named after the historical city of Khushab.

The district consists of four tehsils: Khushab, Noorpur Thal, Quaidabad and Naushera. Khushab is home to the Heavy Water and Natural Uranium Research Reactor, part of Pakistan's Special Weapons Program. District Khushab shares boundaries with the districts of Sargodha, Jhelum, Chakwal, Mianwali, Bhakkar and Jhang.

== History ==
The word Khushab is derived from two Persian words "Khush" (lit. 'sweet') and "Aab" (lit. 'water'), referring to the river Jhelum. The city was evidently well-established by the early 16th century; the Mughal emperor Babur mentions Khushab along with Bhera and Chiniot as the frontier cities between Hindustan and Kabul in his memoirs Baburnama. In the Ain-i-Akbari, written during the reign of Akbar in c. 1590, Khushab was enumerated as one of the parganas in the Sind Sagar sarkar of the Mughal province of Panjab.

After the decline of Mughal Empire in the 18th century, Khushab came under the control of Tiwana clan. The Tiwanas built the fortified towns of Mitha Tiwana and Nurpur Tiwana, and expanded their landholdings at the expense of Awans of Salt Range and the Thal Nawabs. Khushab was annexed by Ranjit Singh in 1817, but the area was later restored to Fateh Khan Tiwana as jagir in return for military services. After the annexation of Punjab by the British in 1849, Khushab became part of the Shahpur District. In 1960, Khushab and Sargodha Districts were created after the bifurcation of Shahpur District.

== Geography ==
Khushab is situated between the cities of Sargodha and Mianwali, near the river Jhelum. The district capital is Jauharabad (founded 1953, pop. 39,477).

Khushab consists of agricultural lowland plains, lakes, and hills. Parts of the Thal desert touch the district, which has a breadth of over 70 miles (110 km) and is situated between the Indus and Jhelum rivers.

There are three lakes (Uchhali, Khabbaki, and Jahlar) in the district. Kanhatti Garden is the largest forest in Khushab district, near Khabbaki village in the Soon Valley. Khabikki Lake is a salt-water lake in the southern Salt Range. The lake is one kilometre wide and two kilometres long. Khabikki is also the name of a neighbouring village. Sakesar is the highest mountain in the Salt Range, and is the site of the ancient Amb Temples. Sakesar’s summit is 1,522 m (4,946 ft) high and is situated in Khushab District.

== Demographics ==
Historical population
Year	Pop.	±% p.a.
1951	268,118	—
1961	360,395	+3.00%
1972	543,314	+3.80%
1981	641,366	+1.86%
1998	905,711	+2.05%
2017	1,280,372	+1.84%
2023	1,501,089	+2.69%

As of the 2023 census, Khushab district has 248,304 households and a population of 1,501,089. The district has a sex ratio of 104.80 males to 100 females and a literacy rate of 62.52%: 75.59% for males and 49.03% for females. 371,528 (24.75% of the surveyed population) are under 10 years of age. 418,745 (27.90%) live in urban areas.

Religion in Khushab district (2023)
Religion	Percent
Islam	98.85%
Christianity	1%
Other	0.15%

Religion in contemporary Khushab District
Religious group	1941		2017		2023	
Religious group	Pop.	%	Pop.	%	Pop.	%
Islam	211,565	90.08%	1,267,776	99.02%	1,483,583	98.85%
Hinduism (Note: 1941 census: Including Ad-Dharmis)	17,475	7.44%	12	0%	55	0%
Sikhism	5,809	2.47%	—N/a	—N/a	14	0%
Christianity	8	0%	10,511	0.82%	15,011	1%
Ahmadi	—N/a	—N/a	2,058	0.16%	2,123	0.14%
Others (Note: Including Jainism, Buddhism, Zoroastrianism, Judaism, or not stated)	2	0%	15	0%	49	0%
Total Population	234,859	100%	1,280,372	100%	1,500,835	100%
Note: 1941 census data is for Khushab tehsil of the former Shahpur District, which roughly corresponds to contemporary Khushab district. District and tehsil borders have changed since 1941.

According to the 1998 census, the primary language of the district is Punjabi, spoken by 97.7% of the population, with Urdu being spoken by 1.5%.

Languages of Khushab district (2023)
1. Punjabi (92.4%)
2. Saraiki (2.39%)
3. Pashto (2.05%)
4. Urdu (1.43%)
5. Others (1.75%)

At the 2023 census, 92.38% of the population spoke Punjabi, 2.05% Pashto, 2.39% Saraiki and 1.43% Urdu as their first language. The dialect of Punjabi spoken here is Shahpuri.

== Education ==
According to Pakistan District Education Ranking, a report released by Alif Ailaan, Khushab is ranked 42 nationally with an education score of 65.42 and learning score of 65.82.

The readiness score of Khushab is 62.33. The infrastructure score of the district is 88.11, which indicates that the schools in Khushab have adequate facilities

== Administrative divisions ==
Khushab got the status of district in 1982. At the start, the district was divided into two tehsils, Khushab, Noorpur Thal. Later on Quaidabad was given the status of Tehsil in March 2007 and Naushera (Wadi e Soon) became 4th Tehsil of District Khushab in March 2013. In the local bodies delimitation of 2000 (before the creation of the Tehsil Quaidabad and Naushehra), it contained a total of fifty-one Union Councils. In the 2015 delimitation of District Khushab, 48 rural union councils and 7 urban Municipal Committees were created by the election Commission of Pakistan.

=== Khushab Tehsil ===
In 2000, Tehsil Khushab was subdivided into 32 Union councils; but in 2015, 10 urban Union councils (Khushab 5, Jauharabad 2, Hadali 2 and Mitha Tiwana 1) transferred to Municipal Committees whereas six Union councils have become the part of Tehsil Naushehra. Now Tehsil Khushab has 18 Union councils and 5 Municipal Committees:

Union Councils

- Botala
- Chak No.50/Mb
- Daiwal
- Hassanpur Tiwana
- Jabbi Shareef
- Katha Saghral
- Kund

Union Councils

- Lukoo
- Mohibpur
- Dhak Janjua
- Nali Shumali
- Nari
- Padhrar
- Roda
- Sandral
- Talloker
- Waheer

Municipal Committee / Corporation

- Khushab
- Jauharabad
- Hadali
- Mitha Tiwana
- Girote

=== Noorpur Thal Tehsil ===
Noorpur Thal is subdivided into 12 Union Councils and 1 Municipal Committee.

Union Councils

- Adhi Kot
- Adhi Sargal
- Biland
- Jamali Noorpur
- Jaura Kalan
- Jharkal

Union Councils

- Khai Khurd
- Khatwan
- Pelowaince
- Rahdari
- Rangpur
- Noorpur Rural

Municipal Committee

- Noorpur

=== Quaidabad Tehsil ===
Quaidabad is subdivided into 10 Union Councils and 2 Municipal Committees.

Union Councils

- Bandial Janubi
- Bijar
- Chak No.14/Mb
- Choha
- Goleywali
- Gunjial Janubi
- Gunjial Shumali
- Okhali Mohlah
- Utra Janubi
- Warcha

Municipal Committee

- Quaidabad
- Mitha Tiwana

=== Naushera Tehsil ===
Naushera (Wadi-e-Soon) is subdivided into 6 Union Councils and 1 Municipal Committee.

Union Councils

- Angah
- Khabaki
- Khura
- Kufri
- Mardwal
- Uchhali

Municipal Committee

- Naushera (Soon Valley)

Tehsil	Area (km²)	Pop. (2023)	Density (ppl/km²) (2023)	Literacy rate (2023)	Union Councils
Khushab	2,115	816,682	386.14	65.94%	18
Noorpur Thal	2,500	264,597	105.84	55.58%	12
Quaidabad	1,080	274,959	254.59	55.11%	10
Naushera (Wadi-e-Soon)	816	144,851	177.51	70.43%	6

== Notable people ==
- Fateh Khan Tiwana, British Raj-era feudal landlord
- Khuda Buksh Tiwana, Pakistani politician
- Ehsan Ullah Tiwana, Pakistani politician
- Shakir Bashir Awan, politician and social activist
- Ahmed Nadeem Qasmi, Urdu writer
- Wasif Ali Wasif, Sufi poet and writer
- Abdulqadir Hassan, writer and journalist
- Idris Azad, philosopher and poet
- Sardar Sobha Singh, Indian real estate developer
- Ujjal Singh, Indian politician
- Khushwant Singh, Indian novelist and politician
- Sohail Warraich, writer and journalist
- Naeem Khan Awan, Pakistani politician
- Sumaira Malik, Pakistani politician
- Feroz Khan Noon, Pakistani politician
- Sultan Khan, chess player
