= Family of Imran Khan =

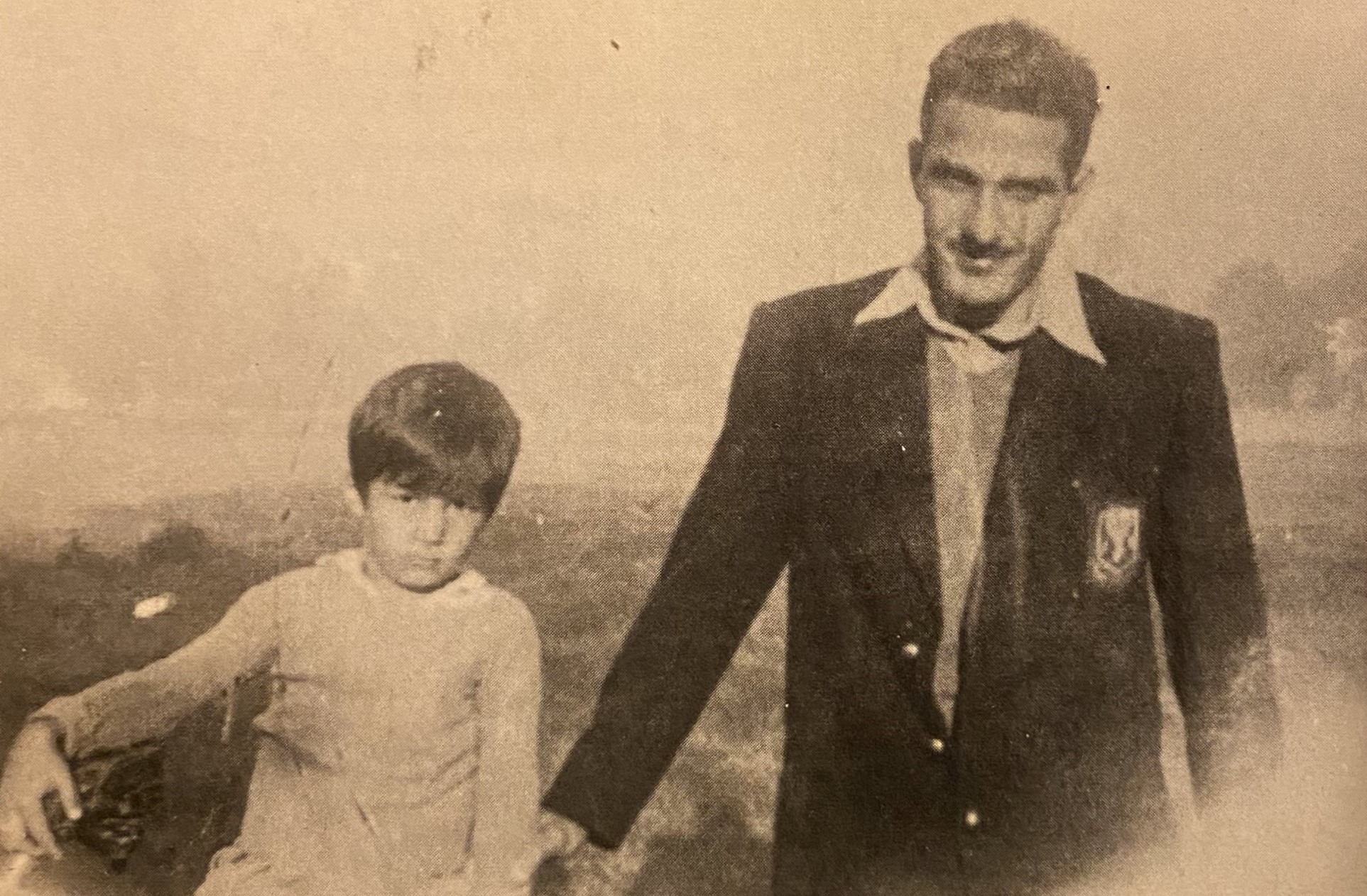
- Khan with his uncle Javed Zaman, who would later become his cricket mentor, c. 1957.
- Current region: Mianwali, Lahore, and Islamabad
- Origin: Kaniguram and Mianwali
- Members: Imran Khan; Bushra Bibi; Sulaiman Isa Khan; Kasim Khan
- Connected members: Jemima Khan; Ikramullah Khan Niazi; Shaukat Khanum; Ahmed Raza; Javed Zaman; Humayun Zaman; Khaled Ahmed; Javed Burki; Jamshed Burki; Majid Khan; Asad Jahangir; Ijaz Khan; Sherandaz Khan; Bilal Omer Khan; Babar Zaman; Hafeez Ullah Niazi; Najeebullah Khan Niazi; Sanaullah Khan Niazi; Amin Ullah Khan; Bazid Khan; Kamran Khan
- Connected families: Burki
- Distinctions: First Family of Pakistan

The family of Imran Khan, the 19th prime minister of Pakistan and former captain of the Pakistan cricket team, is a prominent Pakistani family of Pathan origin with Niazi and Burki ancestry. They are active in sports, politics, and the Pakistan Armed Forces.

Imran, his third wife Bushra Bibi, and her children were the first family for the duration of his premiership. Imran's father Ikramullah Khan Niazi was a civil engineer, while his mother Shaukat Khanum was a housewife and daughter of a prominent civil servant. Imran has two children from his first wife, Jemima Goldsmith.

== Immediate family ==
=== Wives ===
==== Jemima Goldsmith ====
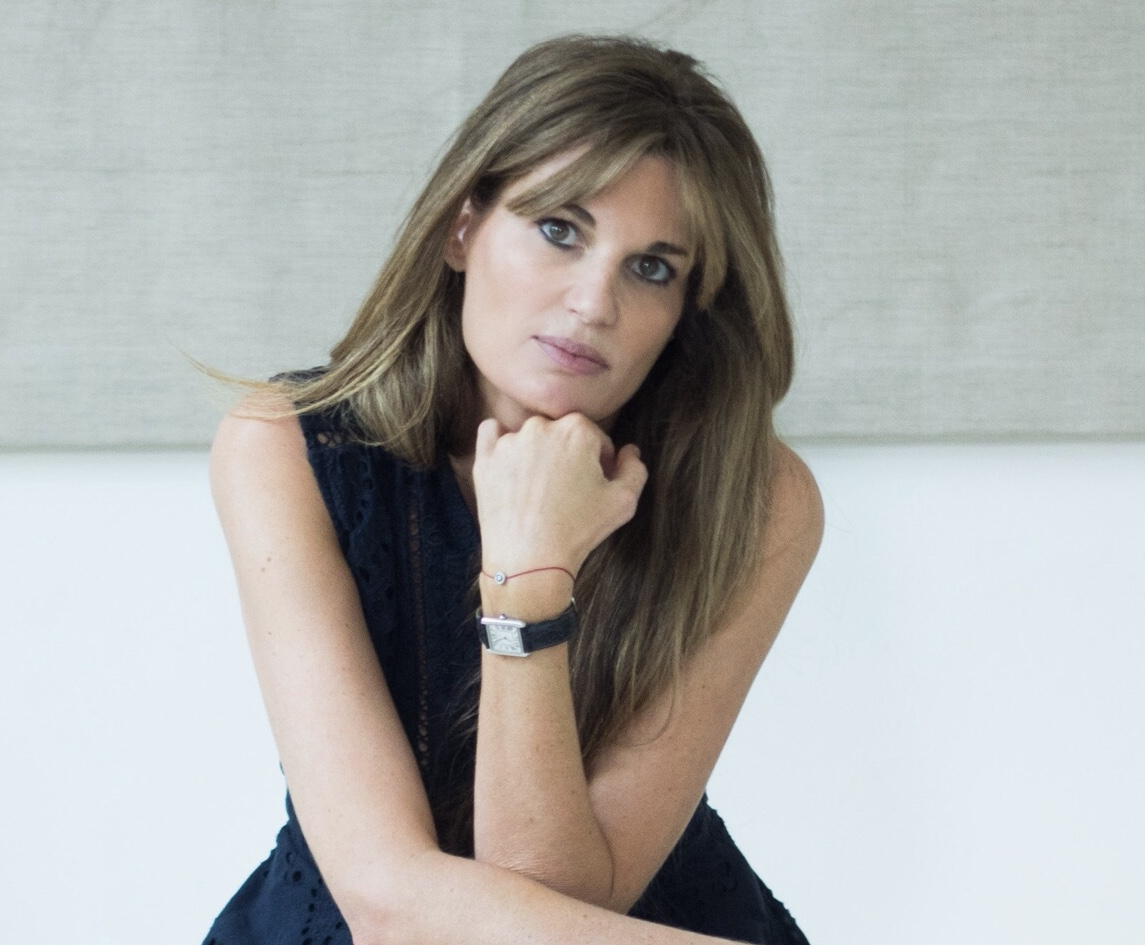
Jemima Goldsmith

On 16 May 1995, Khan married Jemima Goldsmith, in a traditional Pakistani wedding ceremony in Paris. A month later, on 21 June, they were married again in a civil ceremony at the Richmond registry office in England, followed by a reception at the Goldsmiths' house in Surrey which was attended by London's elite. The wedding was named by the media as "The wedding of the century".

Jemima Marcelle Goldsmith is the eldest child of Lady Annabel Vane-Tempest-Stewart and Billionaire financier Sir James Goldsmith, who was one of richest men in UK. Goldsmith enrolled at the University of Bristol in 1993 and studied English, but dropped out when she was married in 1995. She eventually completed her bachelor's degree in March 2002 with upper second-class honours. In 2003, she received her MA in Middle Eastern Studies at the School of Oriental and African Studies, University of London, focusing on Modern Trends in Islam.

The marriage, described as "tough" by Khan, ended in 2004 after nine years. Shortly after their marriage, Imran and Jemima arrived at Zaman Park in Lahore from their honeymoon at one of the Goldsmiths' farms in Spain, and were greeted by international and local reporters. It was also announced that Jemima had converted to Islam and she would use 'Khan' as her last name.

As an agreement of his marriage, Khan spent four months a year in England and the rest in Lahore. The marriage produced two sons, Sulaiman Isa (born 18 November 1996) and Kasim (born 10 April 1999). During the marriage Jemima actively participated in a Khan led charity drive for the Shaukat Khanum Memorial Cancer Hospital & Research Centre and also supported her husband in starting his initial political career.

Rumours circulated that the couple's marriage was in crisis. Jemima placed an advertisement in Pakistan newspapers to deny them. It read: "Whilst it is true that I am currently studying for a master's degree at the School of Oriental and African Studies in London, it is certainly not true to say that Imran and I are having difficulties in our marriage. This is a temporary arrangement." On 22 June 2004, it was announced that the couple had divorced, ending the nine-year marriage because it was "difficult for Jemima to adapt to life in Pakistan" despite both their best efforts.

The marriage ended amicably. Khan described the six months leading to the divorce and the six months after as the hardest years of his life. Following their divorce, Jemima returned to England with their sons.

==== Reham Khan ====
In January 2015, Imran Khan married British Pakistani journalist and television anchor Reham Khan. The marriage was conducted via a nikah ceremony at Khan's residence in Bani Gala. The marriage ended in divorce nine months later, in October 2015.

Reham is ethnic Pashtun, belonging to the Lughmani sub-clan of the Swati tribe. She comes from Mansehra in the Hazara region of Khyber Pakhtunkhwa, and speaks Hindko, in addition to Pashto and Urdu.

==== Bushra Bibi ====
Khan married Bushra Bibi, who was in her 40s, on 18 February 2018 at his residence in Lahore. The couple had been introduced to each other by Bushra's sister, Maryam Riaz Wattoo, who at the time led party operations in the United Arab Emirates She is known for her connection to Sufism; prior to her marriage with Khan, she had been his spiritual mentor (murshid). Bushra has two sons and three daughters, to whom Imran is a step-father, from her first marriage to Khawar Maneka.

=== Children ===
==== Sulaiman Isa Khan ====
Khan's eldest son with Jemima named Sulaiman Isa was born in November 1996 at the Portland Hospital in London.

==== Kasim Khan ====
Imran's second son with Jemima named Kasim was born on 10 April 1999 in England.

== Elementary family ==
=== Parents ===
==== Ikramullah Khan Niazi ====
Imran Khan's father, Ikramullah Khan Niazi, was born in Mianwali on 24 April 1922. He was a civil engineer who graduated from the Imperial College London in 1946 and was a member of the IMechE. Ikramullah was a staunch supporter of the Pakistan Movement during the days of the British Raj and was "fiercely anti-colonial"; he would tell off local waiters at the Lahore Gymkhana Club who would speak to him in English. He worked in the Pakistan Public Works Department and retired in 1959 as Superintending Engineer to establish the Republic Engineering Corporation Limited, a civil engineering consultant firm which was in negotiation with the Saudi Arabian government to provide its services in February 1977.

He was also a philanthropist, founding a charity called the Pakistan Educational Society which "funded the university education of underprivileged but talented children." Ikramullah Niazi served as a board member of the Shaukat Khanum Memorial Cancer Hospital & Research Centre (SKMCH&RC) in his later years. He died on 19 March 2008 at the age of 85 from pneumonia, after a protracted illness for which he was being treated at SKMCH&RC. He is buried at the family's ancestral graveyard in Mianwali.

==== Shaukat Khanum ====
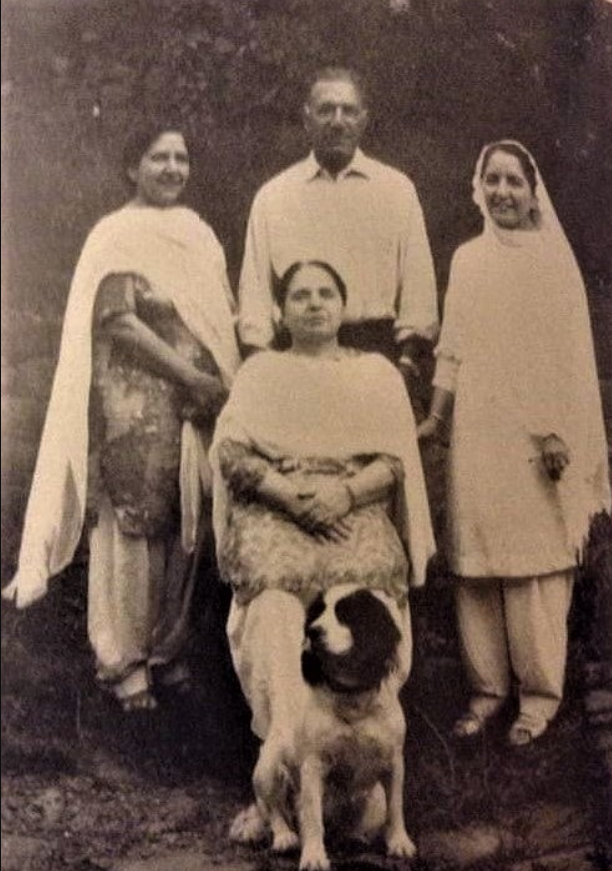
Shaukat Khanum (left) with her siblings, Ahmed Raza (middle), Iqbal Bano (seated), and Naema Khanum (right) in a family portrait, c. 1963.

Imran's mother, Shaukat Khanum, was a housewife. Born in 1922 in Jullundur to Ahmed Hassan Khan (1880-1955) and Amir Bano (1885-1985), she belonged to a Burki Pashtun family. She was the youngest child and had one brother, Ahmed Raza, and two sisters: Iqbal Bano, the wife of Wajid Ali Khan Burki and mother of cricketer Javed Burki, and Naema Khanum, the wife of Jahangir Khan and mother of cricketer Majid Khan.

Imran credits his mother as having played a deep influential role in his upbringing. Recalling that he grew up with religion, with his mother teaching him Islamic history through bedtime stories. She told him tales of Moses and Pharaoh, Joseph and his brothers, and the life of the Islamic Prophet Muhammad, each carrying a moral lesson.

One story that deeply resonated with Imran was about an elderly Meccan who wanted to convert to Islam because his entire clan had done so but admitted that he was too old to change his habits. The Prophet Muhammad advised him, "Tell the truth. That is the one thing you need to be a Muslim."

She also shared how her father, Ahmed Hassan Khan, modeled his life after the Prophet, with Ahmed often saying, "This is what the Prophet did," even in small habits like his fondness for honey and dates.

In 1985, she died at the age of 63 due to cancer. The helplessness and personal experience of seeing his mother diagnosed with cancer, motivated Khan to build a cancer hospital in Pakistan where those who could not afford expensive care could be treated well. In 1994, the Shaukat Khanum Memorial Cancer Hospital & Research Centre was founded by Khan in Lahore, and named in memory of his mother. A second Shaukat Khanum cancer hospital has been inaugurated in Peshawar, while plans are underway for a third hospital to be located in Karachi.

=== Siblings ===
Khan has four sisters: Rubina Khanum, Aleema Khanum, Uzma Khanum and Noreen Niazi.

Khan's elder sister, Rubina Khanum, is an alumnus of the London School of Economics and held a senior post with the United Nations.

Aleema Khanum is an entrepreneur and philanthropist who is the founder of a Lahore-based textile buying house, CotCom Sourcing (Pvt.) Ltd. She graduated with an MBA from the Lahore University of Management Sciences in 1989. Her textile buying house has served textile retailers and agents across the globe, and maintains representative offices in Karachi and New York. Aleema served as marketing director for the Shaukat Khanum Memorial Trust Hospital, and played an instrumental role in fundraising efforts for the hospital. She is a member of the board of governors of the hospital. She is also a member of the board of the Imran Khan Foundation and Namal Education Foundation, and several charitable and social welfare organisations including the Hameed Muggo Trust and the SAARC Association of Home-Based Workers.

Of Khan's other sisters, Uzma Khanum is a qualified surgeon based in Lahore while Rani Khanum is a university graduate who coordinates charity activities.

Shortly after her marriage to Imran Khan, Jemima Khan acknowledged the support she received from Khan's sisters while adjusting to life in Lahore and described them as "educated, strong women, with lives of their own."

== Paternal family ==
Imran Khan's father belonged to the Niazi Pashtun tribe, who were long settled in Mianwali in northwestern Punjab. Khan's paternal family hail from the Shermankhel sub-clan of the Niazis. One of Imran's ancestors was said to have killed a lion with his bare hands during a hunting expedition. He reportedly entered Mianwali carrying the lion on his shoulders, and the event left such an impression that his clan became known as Shermankhel, meaning "descendants of the lion killer."

The Niazis had come to the subcontinent with invading Afghan tribes during the fifteenth century. Imran identifies Haibat Khan Niazi as a paternal ancestor, a sixteenth century military general of Sher Shah Suri and later governor of Punjab.

The Niazis mainly speak Saraiki and are based in Mianwali and surrounding areas, where family and tribal networks are strong and where, according to Khan, "even third cousins know each other".

=== Grandparents ===
Imran Khan's paternal grandfather, Muhammad Azeem Khan Niazi, was a physician. His paternal family's ancestral haveli (mansion), known as Azeem Manzil, is located in Shermankhel Mahallah, Mianwali. Named after his grandfather who built it, the mansion remains home to Khan's extended relatives. It spans ten kanals, with the family's ancestral graveyard—where his paternal grandfather, grandmother, and father are buried—situated nearby.

Khan began his political campaign from Mianwali in 2002, winning his first seat in the National Assembly from the city which he calls his hometown.

=== Uncles ===
Azeem Khan Niazi had four sons: Ikramullah Khan Niazi (Imran's father), Amanullah Khan Niazi, Zafarullah Khan Niazi, and Faizullah Khan Niazi. Imran's paternal uncle Amanullah was a lawyer and politician, serving as a senior member of the Muslim League, while Zafarullah Khan Niazi was a businessman. Imran's father, Ikramullah, along with his uncles Zafarullah and Amanullah, previously lived in the family haveli, which now belongs to Khan's cousin, Inamullah Niazi.

=== Cousins ===
Zafarullah Khan Niazi had several sons, including Khan's paternal cousin Inamullah Niazi; a politician and former parliamentarian who was a member of the Pakistan Muslim League (N) for nearly two decades, before becoming senior vice-president of Khan's Tehreek-e-Insaf in Punjab in 2013. He later rejoined the PML (N), following a dispute over election ticket distributions. Inamullah's brother and occasional columnist Hafeez Ullah Niazi is also Imran's brother-in-law, through cousin marriage to Imran's sister. They have other brothers, including Irfan Ullah Khan Niazi, and their youngest brother, the late Najeebullah Khan Niazi.

According to Dawn, many members of Khan's paternal tribe, and particularly his cousins, have been traditional supporters of Khan's rival party, the PML-N, even after Khan founded his own party. The newspaper noted that Khan's ancestral home functioned "partially as a local office for the PML-N" and that instead of Khan, the family home featured posters of the Sharifs and pictures of other family members. Inamullah was reportedly unhappy when he was snubbed and not given an election ticket from the PTI's platform, causing Inamullah and his brothers to part ways with Khan and heavily criticise him on the media. Commenting on the bitter family politics, Khan once said: "What should I say? It is a family matter. They are my brothers, Hafizullah and Saeedullah, and their contributions to PTI are great. Inamullah was new to the party... but I did [what I thought was fair]."

Another cousin, Saeedullah Khan Niazi was the president of the PTI in Punjab. He also has a cousin, Ahmed Khan Niazi, who serves as his head of security. Other cousins include Amin Ullah Khan and Major General Sanaullah Khan Niazi.

== Maternal family ==
According to a tribal legend, they may have served as bodyguards for Mehmood Ghaznavi who conquered much of Afghanistan, Pakistan and parts of northern India in the eleventh century, and were awarded lands. They made their living as traders, taking horses and silk to India. Some members of the Burki tribe emigrated from Kaniguram around 1600 AD and formed a settlement in the city of Jullundur (40 miles from Lahore), where Khan's mother was born. According to Khan, his maternal family had been based in Jalandhar for over 600 years before migrating to Pakistan after the Partition of British India. His mother's family played an instrumental role in establishing the Islamia College in Jalandhar.

Maternally, Khan is a descendant of the Sufi warrior-poet and inventor of the Pashto alphabet, Pir Roshan, a Burki born in Jullundur who hailed from Kaniguram. According to a Burki historian, K. Hussain Zia, the Burki emigration from Kaniguram was prompted by a severe drought; "The elders decided that some people would have to leave in order for the others to survive. It was thus that 40 families bade farewell to Kaniguram. The entire population walked with them for some miles and watched from the top of a hill till they were out of sight." These forty caravans would eventually arrive in Jalandhar, an area which the Burkis were already acquainted with previously, on account of their trading routes to India via the Grand Trunk Road.

In Jullundur, the Burkis established twelve fortified villages referred to as "bastis", known as Basti Pathan (lit. Pathan Colony). To preserve their ethnic identity and keep their Pashtun culture intact in India, they did not marry outside their tribe. Khan's maternal grandfather, Ahmed Hasan Khan, was a civil servant and was known to have hosted Quaid-e-Azam Muhammad Ali Jinnah, the Founder of Pakistan, at Basti Pathan. Until the 18th century, the Jalandhar Burkis retained ties and trading links with their kinsmen back in Kaniguram. However, these links were cut off following local instability during Sikh resistance against the Mughal Empire. As a result of this, the Jalandhar Burkis lost much of their language and cultural traits, adopting the Punjabi language.

Following the Partition of British India and the Independence of Pakistan in 1947, the entire Burki clan migrated to Lahore in Pakistan, escaping the carnage and violence that ensued during the partition. In Lahore, the Burkis settled in an affluent area which came to be known as Zaman Park, and it was here among his maternal family where Imran Khan spent much of his youth growing up. The area is named after Imran's maternal grandfather's brother (i.e. grand-uncle), Khan Bahadur Mohammed Zaman Khan, who settled in Lahore before the partition and was serving as postmaster general of the Punjab Province (British India). When the Burkis from Jalandhar arrived to Lahore, they took shelter in Zaman's house and eventually took up surrounding houses vacated by Hindus who left for India. Thus, all of Imran's maternal family established themselves in Zaman Park. Imran's parents built their house in the same area, which he now owns. Imran grew up playing cricket with his cousins in the neighbourhood. The name Zaman Park came from the presence of a park, around which the houses were located.

Imran Khan's maternal family is known for its sporting tradition; the Burki clan has produced a long line of cricketers and played an influential role in Pakistan's cricket history. Eight of his cousins played first-class cricket. The most prominent of them are Javed Burki and Majid Khan, who went on to represent the national team and served as captains. In total, up to forty members of the Burki tribe have at some point played first-class cricket in British India or Pakistan. Two of Imran's mother's cousins also captained the Pakistan national field hockey team.

=== Great-grandfather ===
Imran's maternal great-grandfather, Ahmad Shah Khan, (born 2 November 1840 — died 1 February 1921), served as a civil servant, honorary district judge, and President of the All-India Muslim League in Jullundur.

=== Grandparents ===
Imran's maternal grandfather Ahmad Hasan Khan was born in 1880 and had also been a civil servant. He entered the Government College Lahore in 1900, and was reputed in sport, captaining the cricket and football teams at the college. After completing his studies, Ahmed entered the government service. At the height of his career in civil service, he served as the census commissioner of Punjab. He was posted in various areas, including a posting as a District Commissioner in Mianwali (the hometown of Imran Khan's paternal family). Imran writes his mother "instilled in me a pride that the Pashtuns had never been subjugated and had constantly fought the British. Her family had ended up living in twelve fortresses, known as basti Pathan, near the town of Jalandhar (where she took much pride in saying my grandfather had hosted Muhammad Ali Jinnah)."

Writing on his maternal grandmother, Amir Bano, Khan said that his mother would "make us children go to see our maternal grandmother with our cousins every day for half an hour. These evenings with her were most enjoyable. She would know everything that was going on in our lives. In fact she would get involved in all our problems and we would tell her things that even our parents would not know." According to Khan, his grandmother died at the age of a hundred and "all her mental faculties were fully intact." He also writes that his grandmother died shortly after his own mother died in 1985, and that she might have lived longer but could not get over the loss; "my mother being her youngest child... It almost seemed as if she decided it was time for her to go. She refused to get out of bed and three months after my mother's death she passed away."

=== Uncles and aunts ===
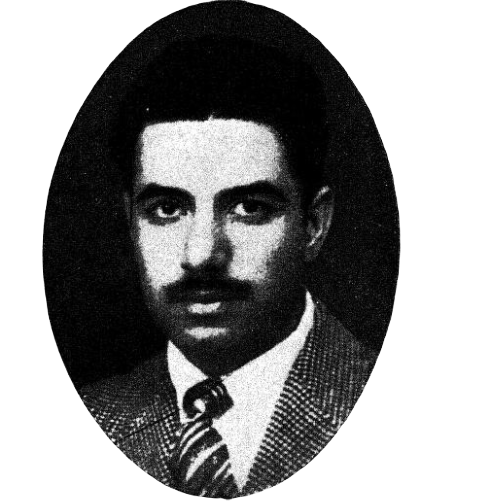
Ahmed Raza Khan

Ahmed Hasan Khan had four daughters: the eldest, Iqbal Bano, followed by Mubarak and Shaukat (Imran's mother). Another sister is said to have died early. Ahmed Raza Khan (Imran's maternal uncle) was the only son. Ahmed Raza was known affectionately by his friends as "Aghajan", and played fifteen first-class cricket matches in India and Pakistan, playing for Northern India followed by Punjab. He later served as a national selector on the Pakistan Cricket Board.

Imran's eldest maternal aunt, Iqbal Bano, was married to Dr. Wajid Ali Khan Burki, a high-ranking medical corps officer and physician in the Pakistan Army. Imran's second aunt, Mubarak, was married to Jahangir Khan. Jahangir was a cricketer during the British Raj era and played for India. He later served as a cricket administrator in Pakistan until his resignation when his son Majid was close to national selection. He resigned from the post to maintain the impartiality of the Cricket Board.

Imran's uncles Humayun Zaman, Javed Zaman (his cricket mentor), and Ahmed Fuad Zaman, also played first-class cricket and were the sons of Khan Bahadur Zaman Khan, the founder of Zaman Park. Ahmed Fuad retired as a Brigadier in the Pakistan Army.

One of Pakistan's leading English-language columnists, Khaled Ahmed (1943-2024), who belongs to the Burki tribe, was also an uncle of Imran.

=== Cousins ===
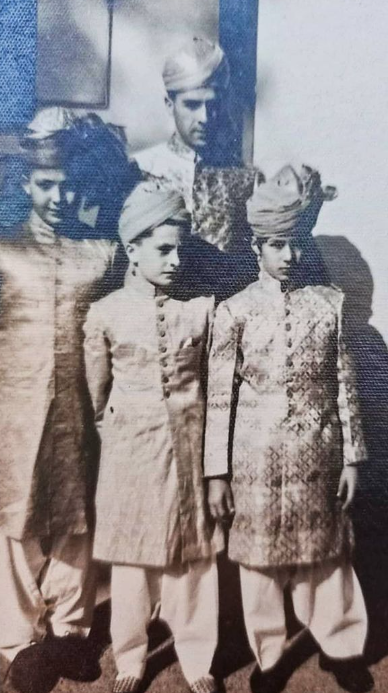
Imran (right) at his cousin Jamshed Burki's wedding (1962)

Wajid Ali Khan Burki and Iqbal Bano's eldest son, Jamshed Burki, is a retired army captain and civil servant who served as a political agent in the Khyber Agency of the tribal areas and went on to become the Interior Secretary of Pakistan. Their second son, Javed Burki, briefly played cricket for Pakistan during the 1960s and also captained the national side. After retiring from cricket, Javed served as secretary to the Ministry of Water and Power of the Government of Pakistan. Their third son, Nausherwan Burki, is a US-based physician and pulmonologist who played an instrumental role in setting up Imran's Shaukat Khanum Cancer Hospital and serves in its board of governors; he was also among the original founders of the Pakistan Tehreek-e-Insaf in 1996.

Jahangir Khan and Mubarak's eldest son Asad Jahangir won an Oxford Blue in cricket and was a first-class cricketer in Pakistan, later serving as Inspector General of the Sindh Police. Their second son, Majid Khan became a cricket legend who captained the national side of Pakistan during the 1970s. Majid's son Bazid Khan is also a cricketer who has played at the national level.

Sherandaz Khan, Ijaz Khan, Babar Zaman, and Major General Bilal Omer Khan, are also cousins of Imran Khan.

== Extended family ==
=== In politics ===
Imran's nephew Hassaan Niazi headed the Insaf Students Federation, the student wing of the PTI. He also has many other nephews. PTI's Additional General Secretary Saifullah Niazi belongs to the Niazi clan and is a distant relative. Lawyer and PTI member Hamid Khan is also a relative.

=== In art ===
One of Imran's father's cousins, Sajjad Sarwar Niazi, was a poet and music composer who served as the director of the Peshawar Radio Station, while his daughter Nahid Niazi earned fame as a singer. Nahid was married to a prominent Bengali music composer Moslehudin, and her sister Najma Niazi was also a popular singer.

=== In sport ===
Shaukat Khanum's grandson, Moin Khan holds a record for traveling from California, America to Lahore, Pakistan on a sports bike. Pakistani cricket captain Misbah-ul-Haq also belongs to the Niazi tribe in Mianwali and shares blood relations with Imran Khan paternally.

Imran's uncle Jahangir's brother-in-law Baqa Jilani also played cricket for India. Jilani's nephew, Sherandaz Khan, was a first-class cricketer, and another distant cousin of Imran from the Burki tribe. He was also the first bowler to dismiss Imran in first-class cricket. Imran's great-uncle Khan Salamuddin and many members of Salamuddin's extended family also made a name in cricket.

=== In the healthcare profession ===
Imran Khan is said to be a distant cousin of the British-Pakistani heart surgeon Hasnat Khan, who had a relationship with Lady Diana. Usman Ameer Khan, a doctor by profession, is also a cousin and a director at Parrhesia News and the Pakistan World Alliance.

=== In the military ===
Many family relatives of Imran, from both the paternal and maternal sides, have served in the Pakistan Armed Forces. Shaukat Khanum's cousin Mrs. Lt Col. Zaheer-ud-Din has two sons, one of whom is Lt. Col. Muhammad Omer Khan. Major General Bilal Omar Khan, who died in the 2009 Rawalpindi mosque attack, was from Khan's maternal family. Major General Sanaullah Khan Niazi was from Imran's paternal family and was assassinated in a roadside blast. Another extended relative, General Zahid Ali Akbar Khan, was an engineering officer in the Pakistan Army, director of the nuclear Project-706, and later chairman of the Pakistan Cricket Board.

=== In banking and economics ===
The Pakistani economist Shahid Javed Burki is an extended relative of Imran. The other son of Shaukat Khanum's cousin Mrs. Lt Col. Zaheer-ud-Din is Muhammad Ali Khan, who is a banker serving as a Vice President in MCB Bank Limited.

== See also ==
- Pets of Imran Khan
- Pakistan

== Bibliography ==
- Chris Hutchins; Dominic Midgley (2015), Goldsmith: Money, Women and Power, BookBaby, p. 163, ISBN 978-0-9933566-3-6
- Piers Morgan (2012), The Insider: The Private Diaries of a Scandalous Decade, Random House, p. 81, ISBN 978-1-4464-9168-3, archived from the original on 24 March 2023
