= Families of heads of state and government of Pakistan =

First Family is an unofficial title for the family of the head of state or head of government of a country (usually a republic). In Pakistan, the family of head of state and government in Pakistan refers to the head of state (the President) or head of government (the Prime Minister), and their immediate family which comprises their spouse (the First Lady or First Gentleman) and their descendants. In the wider context, the First Family may comprise the head of state or head of government's parents, siblings and extended relatives who thus make a dynasty.

== Jinnah family ==
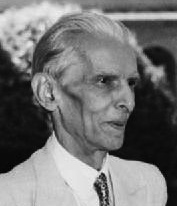
The founder of Pakistan, Muhammad Ali Jinnah

Jinnah family is the family of the founder of Pakistan. Its most notable member, Muhammad Ali Jinnah, is the founder of Pakistan. He is revered in Pakistan as Quaid-i-Azam (Great Leader) and Baba-i-Qaum ("Father of the Nation"); his birthday is a national holiday there. Jinnah was Pakistan's first Governor-General from independence until his death on 11 September 1948. His younger sister, Fatima Jinnah, was one of the leaders of modern-state of Pakistan. She is commonly known in Pakistan as Khātūn-e Pākistān ("Lady of Pakistan") and Māder-e Millat ("Mother of the Nation").

Notable members of the family are:

First Generation

- Poonja Gokuldas Meghji, the grandfather of Muhammad Ali Jinnah and Fatima Jinnah.

Second Generation

- Mitthibai Jinnahbai (1857–1902) was married to Jinnahbai Poonja.

Third Generation

- Muhammad Ali Jinnah, the founder of Pakistan and was the country's first Governor-General
- Fatima Jinnah (1893–1967), known as Mother of the Nation.

Fourth Generation

- Dina Wadia (b. 1919), born to Muhammad Ali Jinnah and Maryam Jinnah. Last member of the Jinnah family.

== Ayub family ==
The members of Ayub's family (Urdu: خاندان ایوب):

- Ayub Khan (President of Pakistan, 1958–1969)

The children of Khan:

First Generation

- Gohar Ayub Khan (Federal Minister for Minister of Foreign Affairs: 25 February 1997 – 7 August 1998)

Second Generation

- Omar Ayub Khan (Federal Minister for Economic Affairs: 17 April 2021 – 10 April 2022)

== Bhutto family ==
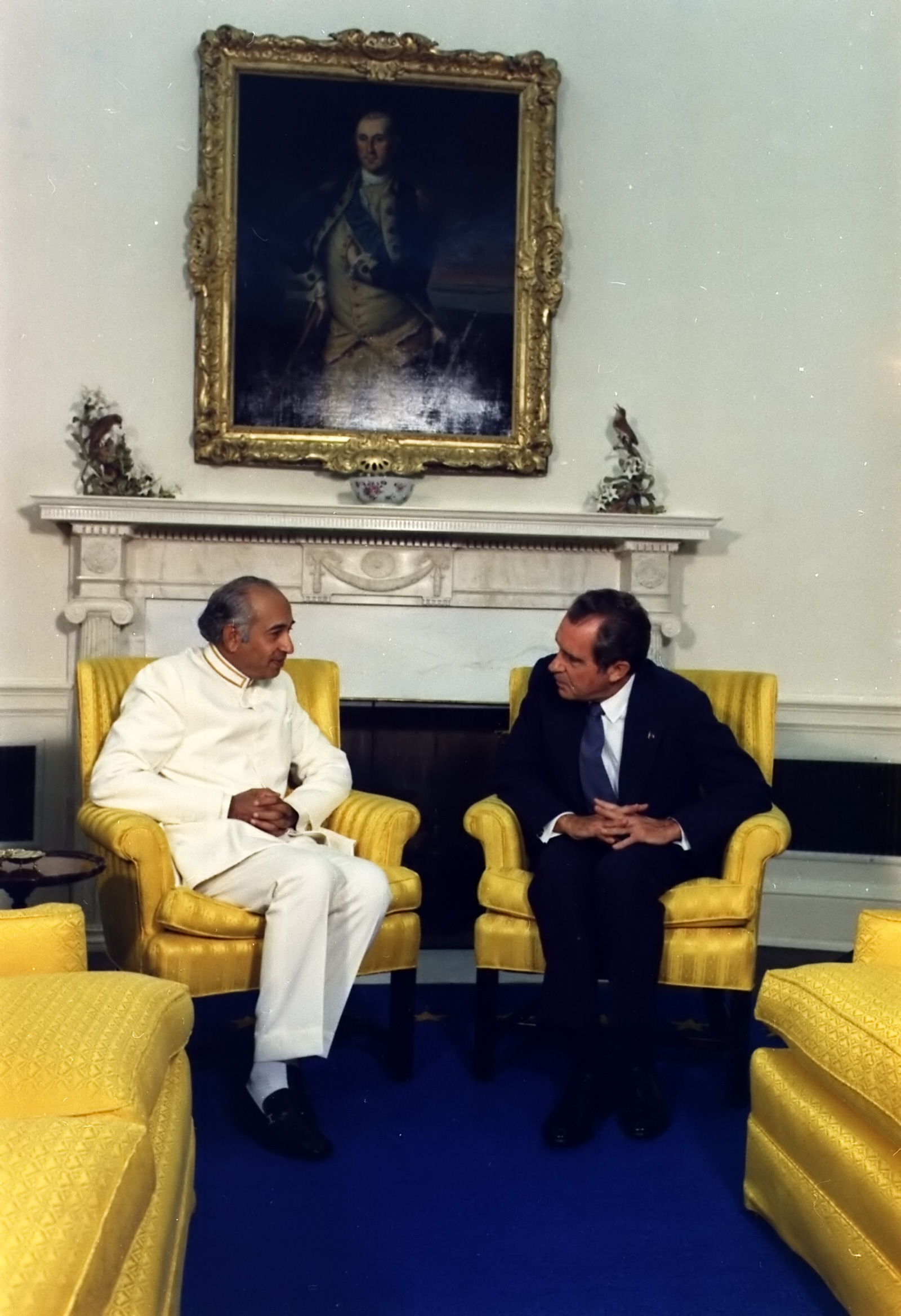
Richard Nixon meeting with President Bhutto of Pakistan in 1973.

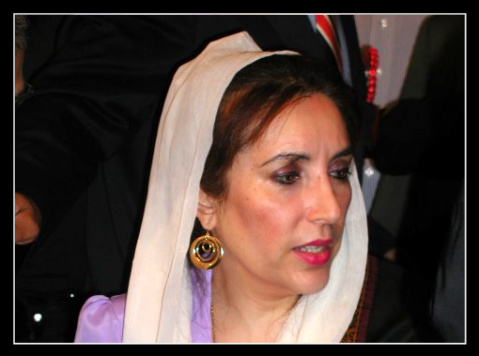
Former Prime Minister of Pakistan, Benazir Bhutto.

A Pakistani political family which has been dominant in the Pakistan Peoples Party (PPP) for most of Pakistan's history since independence. Zulfikar Ali Bhutto was the founder of PPP and served as the ninth Prime Minister of Pakistan from 1973 to 1977, and prior to that as the fourth President of Pakistan from 1971 to 1973. His daughter, Benazir Bhutto, also served as the 11th Prime Minister of Pakistan in two non-consecutive terms from 1988 until 1990 and 1993 until 1996. She was married to Asif Ali Zardari, the who became President of Pakistan after her death. Her daughters alternately served as the First Lady of Pakistan.

Notable members of Bhutto family are:

First Generation

- Ghulam Murtaza Bhutto, grandfather of Zulfiqar Ali Bhutto.

Second Generation

Shah Nawaz Bhutto –– The Dewan of Junagadh and the Father of Zulfiqar Ali Bhutto (Member Bombay Council).

- Wahid Baksh Bhutto –- (1898 –- 1931) was a landowner of Sindh, an elected representative to the Central Legislative Assembly and an educational philanthropist.

Third Generation

- Zulfikar Ali Bhutto, son of Shah Nawaz (President (1970–1973); Prime Minister (1973–1977))
  - Nusrat Bhutto, wife of Zulfikar (former minister without portfolio)
- Mumtaz Bhutto, cousin of Zulfikar, (chief of Bhutto tribe, former chief minister and Governor of Sindh, Federal Minister of Pakistan)

Fourth Generation

- Benazir Bhutto, daughter of Zulfikar (Prime Minister, 1988–1990 and 1993–1996), assassinated December 27, 2007.
- Murtaza Bhutto, elder son of former Prime Minister of Pakistan Zulfikar Ali Bhutto and the brother of former Prime Minister of Pakistan Benazir Bhutto. He was usually known as Murtaza Bhutto and was assassinated under mysterious circumstances.
- Shahnawaz Bhutto, Shahnawaz was studying in Switzerland when Zia ul Haq's military regime executed his father in 1979. Prior to the execution On July 18, 1985, the 27-year-old Shahnawaz was found dead in Nice, France. He died under mysterious circumstances.
- Ameer Bux Bhutto, currently Vice President of Sindh National Front and also ex-Member of Sindh Assembly. He is son of Mumtaz Bhutto.

Fifth Generation

- Fatima Bhutto, Fatima was born in Kabul, Afghanistan while her father Murtaza Bhutto was in exile during the military regime of General Zia ul Haq. Murtaza Bhutto, was son of former Pakistan's President and Prime Minister, Zulfiqar Ali Bhutto.
- Bilawal Bhutto Zardari, son of former Prime Minister Benazir Bhutto and former President Asif Ali Zardari. Chairman of Pakistan People's Party and the current Foreign Minister of Pakistan.

== Sharif family ==
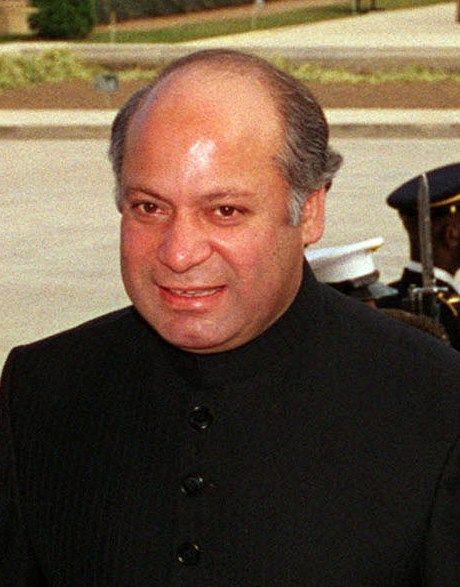
Prime Minister of Pakistan, Nawaz Sharif

Sharif family is a prominent political family of Pakistan which is actively involved in politics of Pakistan though Pakistan Muslim League (N) (PMN-N). PML-N is currently headed by Nawaz Sharif. Nawaz Sharif served as the 12th Prime Minister of Pakistan in three non-consecutive terms from November 1990 to July 1993, from February 1997 until October 12, 1999 and from May 2013 until July 2017. He also remained Chief minister of the Punjab. His brother, Shahbaz Sharif, is the current Chief Minister of the Punjab. They previously remained the First Family for two times in non-consecutive terms and currently hold the title as well. Since, Nawaz has been ousted by the Supreme Court of Pakistan, he will no longer be allowed to take part in politics for 10 years. His family including his daughter Maryam Safdar, and sons Hassan and Hussain Nawaz, have received a negative blow to their political careers.

Notable family members:

First Generation

- Muhammad Sharif, father of Nawaz Sharif.

Second Generation

- Nawaz Sharif, Former Prime Minister of Pakistan
  - Kalsoom Nawaz Sharif is the wife of Nawaz Sharif and was the First Lady of Pakistan in two non-consecutive terms from 1990 till 1993 and from 1996 till 1998.
- Shahbaz Sharif, former chief minister of the Punjab and current Prime Minister of Pakistan.
  - Begum Nusrat Shahbaz, first wife of Shahbaz Sharif.
  - Tehmina Durrani, second wife of Shahbaz Sharif.
- Muhammad Abbas Sahrif, A Pakistani businessman and brother of Nawaz Sharif and Shabaz Sharif.

Third Generation

- Hussain Nawaz Sharif, son of Nawaz Sharif.
- Hassan Nawaz Sharif, son of Nawaz Sharif current
- Maryam Nawaz Sharif, daughter of Nawaz Sharif current chief minister of the Punjab.
- Hamza Shahbaz Sharif, Son of Shahbaz Sharif and the Member of Ex-National Assembly of Pakistan.

== Soomro family ==
- Members of Soomro family (Urdu: خاندان سومرو) in politics are:
- Khan Bahadur Allah Bux Soomro, Twice Chief Minister of Sindh
- Elahi Bux Soomro, remained Member of National Assembly of Pakistan, Speaker National Assembly of Pakistan, Federal Minister
- Rahim Bux Soomro, Minister Sindh
- Mohammad Mian Soomro, remained President of Pakistan, Prime Minister of Pakistan, Senate of Pakistan and Governor of Sindh

== Zia-ul-Haq family ==
The members of Zia-ul-Haq's family (Urdu: خاندان ضياءالحق):

- Muhammad Zia-ul-Haq (President of Pakistan, 1978–1988)
- Begum Shafiq Zia (First Lady of Pakistan, 1978-1988)

The children of the couple:

- Muhammad Ijaz-ul-Haq (Federal Minister for Religious Affairs & Minorities: January 2004 – November 2007)
- Zain Zia
- Dr. Anwar ul Haq (Member of National and Provincial Assembly, provincial minister in Nawaz Sharif's first government)
- Dr. Quratulain Zia
- Rubina Saleem

== Noon family ==
Noon family (Urdu: خاندان نون) is major political family of Pakistan.

Members of Noon family:

- Malik Taimur Hayat Noon
- Malik Adnan Hayat Noon of Nurpur Noon (Sargodha)
- Malik Salman Hayat Noon of Nurpur Noon (Sargodha)
- Malik Amjad Ali Noon of Alipur Noon - former High Commissioner / Ambassador of Pakistan, former District Governor/Nazim Sargodha, former parliamentarian. He also held a number of senior government positions including Chairman State Cement, Chairman PMIC, Chairman PMG, amongst others. He has also been on the board of a number of major national educational institutions including Aitchison College and LUMS.
- Maj (R) Malik Anwar Ali Noon Patriarch of Alipur Noon (Sargodha), politician (founding and executive member PPP, founding and executive member Tehrik-e-Istiklal), law maker, Parliamentarian) and philanthropist.
- Malik Nur Hayat Noon, son of Malik Firoz Khan Noon. Served as minister and set up many successful businesses.
- Malik Firoz Khan Noon Of Nurpur Noon (Sargodha), former Prime Minister and one of the leading members in the struggle for Pakistan.

Other Noon Tribe members, not related directly to the Noon family (Chief family of Punjab) include:

- Rana Taj Ahmed Noon Son of Rana Sultan Ahmad Noon who was Elected Three times Member of Nation Assembly of Pakistan was the closest fellow of Zulfiqar Ali Bhutto.
- Barrister Rana Salman Noon is Grand Son Of Rana Sultan Ahmad Noon and Nephew of Rana Taj Ahmad Noon EX MNA

Belong to Basti Mitho Shujabad, Multan He has done his Bar At Law from Canada Ontario He is a prominent Lawyer practicing Law in Toronto, Canada.

== Leghari family ==
The members of Leghari family (Urdu: خاندان لغاری), in politics:

- Farooq Leghari (ex President of Pakistan)
- Awais Leghari (MPA, MNA, Federal Minister)
- Rafique Haider Khan Leghari (MPA "Punjab"), Minister, Chairman District Council RY Khan
- Arshad Khan Leghari

== Tarar family ==
- Muhammad Rafiq Tarar, (President of Pakistan from 1998 to 2001)
- Saira Afzal Tarar, (MNA, Federal Minister for Health)
- Attaullah Tarar, (MNA, Federal Minister for Information)
- Bilal Farooq Tarar, (MPA, Member for Law)
- Mamoon Jaffar Tarar, (MPA, Chairman Tevta)

== Zardari family ==
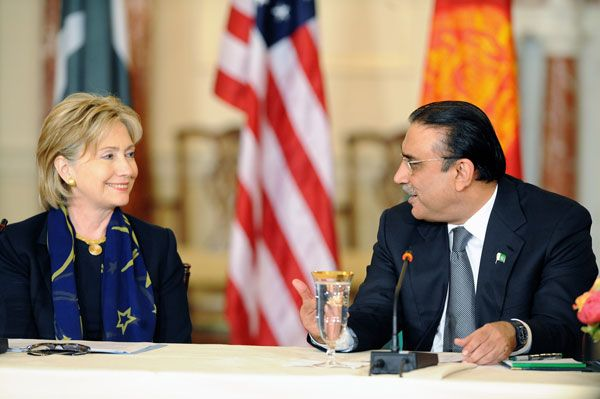
President of Pakistan Asif Ali Zardari and Hillary Clinton

The members of Zardari family (Urdu: خاندان زرداری), in politics:

- Hakim Ali Zardari, the patriarch of Zardari family. He served as the District Mayor (Zila Nazim) of Nawabshah in the year 1964 and was later elected as Member of the National Assembly in the year 1970, 1988 and 1993.
- Asif Ali Zardari, son of Hakim Ali Zardari and husband of Benazir Bhutto, ex-President of Pakistan who also served as MNA from 1988–1990, 1993–1996 and as a Senator from 1996–1999.
- Azra Peechoho, daughter of Hakim Ali Zardari Member of National Assembly from 2002–2008, 2008–2013 and 2013-date
- Faryal Talpur, daughter of Hakim Ali Zardari, Former Nazima (District Mayor) Nawabshah District from 2001–2005 and 2005–2008 later MNA from 2008–2013 and 2013-date
- Bilawal Bhutto Zardari, son of Asif Ali Zardari and Benazir Bhutto, Chairman Pakistan Peoples Party, assumed political successor of the Zardari and Bhutto family

== Abbasi family ==
- Khaqan Abbasi, former Minister for Industries and Production.
  - Shahid Khaqan Abbasi, Ex-Prime Minister of Pakistan, former Minister of Petroleum and Natural Resources
  - Sadia Abbasi, former senator

== Imran Khan family ==
Members of Imran Khan's family, who are noted mainly for contributions in sports and politics:

First Generation

- Wajid Ali Khan Burki, maternal uncle
- Jahangir Khan, maternal uncle
- Ahmed Raza, maternal uncle

Second Generation

- Imran Khan, the former Prime Minister and former cricket captain
  - Jemima Goldsmith (Ex-wife)
  - Reham Khan Swati (Ex- wife)
  - Bushra Bibi, wife of Imran Khan
- Javed Burki, maternal cousin
- Jamshed Burki, maternal cousin
- Asad Jahangir, maternal cousin
- Majid Khan, maternal cousin
- Inamullah Niazi, paternal cousin

Third Generation

- Bazid Khan, son of Majid Khan and maternal first-cousin once removed

== See also ==
- First ladies and gentlemen of Pakistan
- List of Pakistani political families
- Politics of Pakistan
- List of Pakistanis
