= Burki (surname) =

Burki and Bürki are surnames of several origins. "Bürki" is a German surname. It is a diminutive derived from the given name Burk with suffix '-i' and an umlaut. "Burki" is a German surname of similar origin "Burki" may also be associated with the Pashtun tribe Burki. Notable people with the surname include:

== German ==
- Bruno Bürki (born 1931), Swiss pastor
- Cornelia Bürki (born 1953), South African-Swiss Olympic runner
- Daphné Bürki (born 1980), French television host and columnist
- Gianna Hablützel-Bürki (born 1969), Swiss fencer
- Marco Bürki (born 1993), Swiss football player
- Marie José Burki (born 1961), Swiss video artist and educator
- Raymond Burki (1949–2016), Swiss cartoonist
- Roman Bürki (born 1990), Swiss football player
- Sandro Burki (born 1985), Swiss football player
- Vanessa Bürki (born 1986), Swiss football player
- Wajid Ali Khan Burki (1900–1988), Pakistani army general

== Pashtun ==
- Arshad Iqbal Burki (born 1984), Pakistani squash player
- Jamshed Burki, Pakistani politician
- Javed Burki (born 1938), Pakistani cricket player
- Saleem Burki (born 1991), Pakistani cricket player
- Shahid Javed Burki (born 1938), Pakistani economist

== See also ==
- de:Bürki
