= Humayun Zaman =

Pakistani cricketer (1936–2019)

Personal information
- Full name: Humayun Zaman Khan
- Born: 31 January 1936; Jullundur, British Raj
- Died: 17 June 2019 (aged 83); Zaman Park, Lahore, Pakistan
- Batting: Right-handed
- Bowling: Right-arm medium-fast
- Relatives: Babar Zaman (nephew); Majid Khan (nephew); Asad Jahangir Khan (nephew); Imran Khan (nephew)

Domestic team information
- Years: Team
- 1955/56: Pakistan Universities
- 1957/58: Punjab
- 1958/59–1959/60: Lahore
- 1963/64–1964/65: Multan
- 1967/68: Lahore Reds
- 1969/70: Lahore A
- 1970/71: Lahore Greens

Career statistics
Competition	First-class
Matches	23
Runs scored	824
Batting average	32.96
100s/50s	2/4
Top score	151
Balls bowled	2,836
Wickets	49
Bowling average	21.16
5 wickets in innings	1
10 wickets in match	0
Best bowling	5/32
Catches/stumpings	10/–
- Source: ESPNcricinfo, 31 August 2017

Humayun Zaman Khan (Note: Urdu: ہمایوں زمان خان) (31 January 1936 – 17 June 2019) was a Pakistani sportsman who took part in soccer, hockey, and cricket. He played first-class cricket from 1956 to 1971. He captained the cricket teams of Government College University, Lahore, in 1957 and Lahore Gymkhana Club until 1975.

== Early life ==
Humayun Zaman Khan was born on 31 January 1936 in Jullundur into the renowned Burki Pashtun sports family. He was the eldest son of Khan Bahadur Mohammad Zaman Khan, who held the position of Post Master General, Punjab, in British India. Humayun's family produced notable cricket figures like Jahangir Khan and Baqa Jilani, and had a strong presence in various Olympic disciplines, especially hockey. Humayun's family built a seven-bedroom house in Lahore in 1940, becoming the second Muslim family in the Canal Bank area which is now known as Zaman Park. Humayun's father was an uncle of Iqbal Bano, Naima Khanum and Shaukat Khanum, who were the respective mothers of Javed Burki, Majid Khan, and Imran Khan — who all became captains of the Pakistan national cricket team.

== Personal life ==
Humayun and his wife Farzana had four children. Farzana, a fellow Pashtun from the residence of Basti Shah Quli in Jullundur, came from the same neighborhood. One of their sons, Nasir Zaman Khan, is married to the daughter of Jamshed Burki.

== Cricket ==
Coming from a typical Pathan background with a robust physique, Humayun excelled in sports at Aitchison College, playing cricket, football, and hockey. In cricket he was a stylish right-hand batsman, a medium-fast bowler, and an excellent slip fieldsman. He played cricket for Aitchison College, Government College (where he joined in 1953 and captained in 1957), and Lahore Gymkhana, where he served as captain until 1975.

Humayun's best first-class bowling performance was for Punjab in a semi-final of the Quaid-e-Azam Trophy in 1957–58, when he took 4 for 69 and 5 for 32 against Karachi C, as well as top-scoring with 57 not out in the second innings. Karachi C nevertheless won easily. His highest score was 151, when he captained Lahore A against Punjab University in 1969–70.

== Death ==
After having a heart bypass at the age of 60, Humayun also dealt with diabetes, weight problems, knee and spine debilities, and mobility challenges. He died on 17 June 2019, aged 83.
