= Purkey =

Purkey is a surname. Notable people with the surname include:

- Bob Purkey (1929–2008), American baseball player
- Harry R. Purkey (1934–2018), American politician
- Wesley Ira Purkey (1952–2020), American convicted murderer

== See also ==
- Burki (surname)
