= International cricket in 1962 =

International cricket season

The 1962 International cricket season was from May 1962 to August 1962.

== Season overview ==
International tours
Start date	Home team	Away team	Results [Matches]			
Start date	Home team	Away team	Test	ODI	FC	LA
31 May 1962	England	Pakistan	4–0 [5]	—	—	—
14 July 1962	Scotland	Ireland	—	—	1–0 [1]	—

== June ==
=== Pakistan in England ===
Test series
No.	Date	Home captain	Away captain	Venue	Result
Test 530	31 May–4 June	Ted Dexter	Javed Burki	Edgbaston Cricket Ground, Birmingham	England by an innings and 24 runs
Test 531	21–23 June	Ted Dexter	Javed Burki	Lord's, London	England by 9 wickets
Test 532	5–7 July	Colin Cowdrey	Javed Burki	Headingley Cricket Ground, Leeds	England by an innings and 117 runs
Test 533	26–31 July	Ted Dexter	Javed Burki	Trent Bridge, Nottingham	Match drawn
Test 534	16–20 August	Ted Dexter	Javed Burki	Kennington Oval, London	England by 10 wickets

== July ==
=== Ireland in Scotland ===
Two-day Match
No.	Date	Home captain	Away captain	Venue	Result
Match	14–17 July	James Brown	Alec O'Riordan	VRA Cricket Ground, Amsterdam	Scotland by 5 wickets
