= Bilal Omer Khan =

Pakistan army general (1954–2009)

Major General Bilal Omer Khan HI(M) SBt
- بلال عمر خان
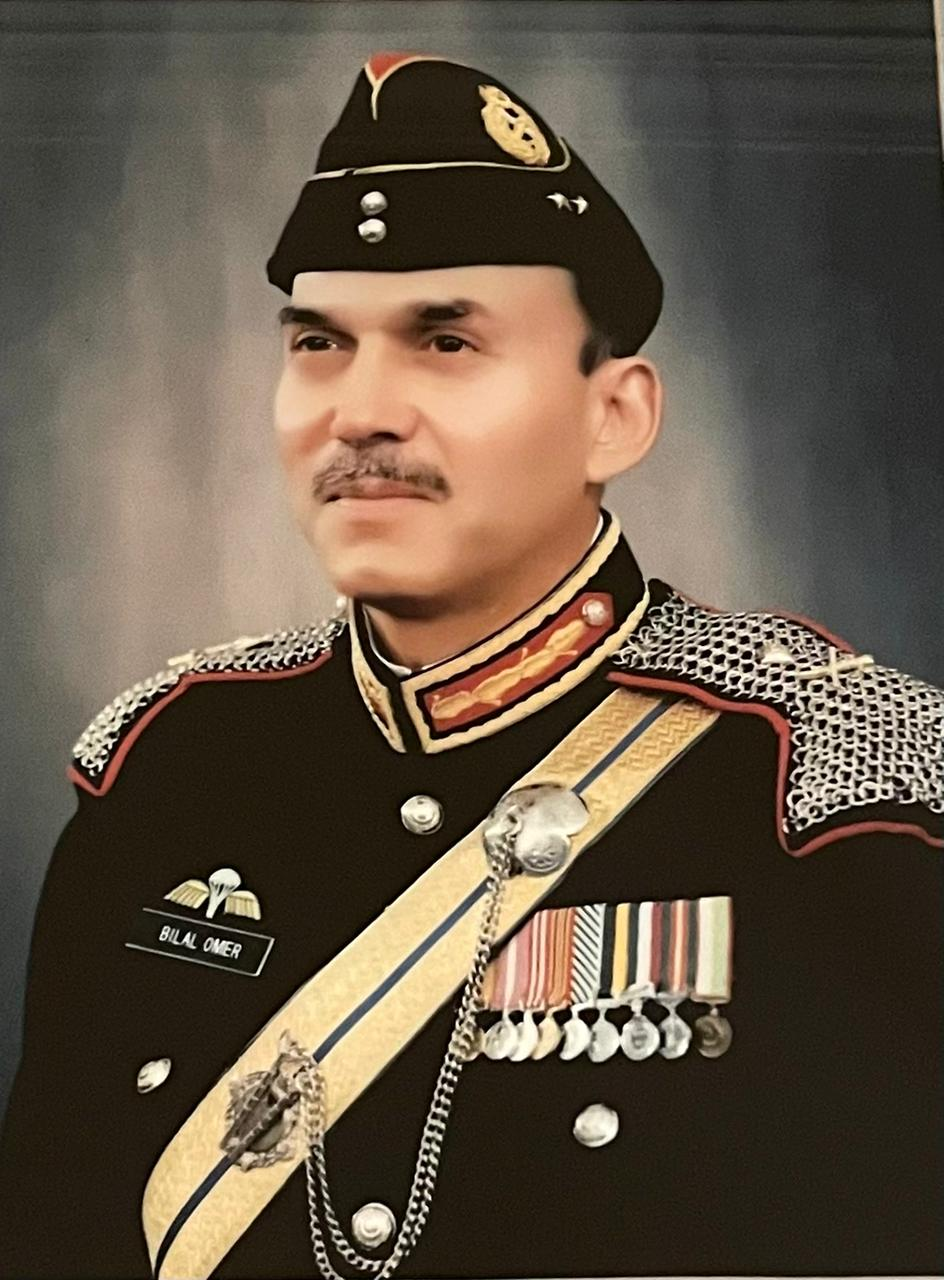

Director General Pakistan Armoured Corps
- In office February 2009 – 4 December 2009

Personal details
- Born: 3 February 1954
- Died: 4 December 2009 (aged 55) Rawalpindi, Punjab, Pakistan
- Cause of death: December 2009 Rawalpindi attack
- Resting place: Westridge Army Graveyard, Rawalpindi
- Spouse: Nabeela Bilal
- Relations: Javed Burki (cousin); Imran Khan (cousin); Majid Khan (cousin)
- Children: 3
- Education: Abbottabad Public School; Pakistan Military Academy; Command and Staff College Quetta; University of Denver (MA)
- Nickname: Billy

Military service
- Branch/service: Pakistan Army
- Years of service: 1973–2009
- Rank: Major General
- Unit: 19th Lancers
- Commands: Pakistan Armoured Corps; Pakistan Rangers; 11th Infantry Division (PAK); 111th Infantry Brigade
- Battles/wars: 2001–2002 India–Pakistan standoff; Insurgency in Khyber Pakhtunkhwa; Operation Rah-e-Haq; Operation Rah-e-Rast
- Awards: Hilal-i-Imtiaz (2006); Sitara-e-Basalat (2010); Marco Polo Sheep Trophy
- Service number: PA-16264

Major General Bilal Omer Khan (Note: Urdu:بلال عمر خان) (3 February 1954 – 4 December 2009), known affectionately as Billy, was a two-star rank general in the Pakistan Army who died in the December 2009 Rawalpindi attack along with 39 others. He was posthumously awarded the Sitara-e-Basalat on Pakistan Day 2010.

Throughout his career, he held the positions of Director General Armoured Corps, Director General Plans and Operations at Joint Staff Headquarters, Commander 11th Infantry Division, Commander 10th Infantry Division, and Commander 111th Infantry Brigade.

== Early life and family ==
Bilal Omar Khan was born on 3 February 1954 into a Burki Pashtun family. His father Omer Khan, was a retired Colonel in the Pakistan Army and was the founding father of the Pakistan Ordnance Factories depot in Havelian. Bilal has one brother, Talha Omer who retired as a major in the Pakistan Army and a sister Yasmin Salman Omer. Bilal grew up in Lalazar Colony Rawalpindi and later attended the Abbottabad Public School. Including Bilal and Talha, the Burki family has produced several military officials and cricketers such as Javed Burki, Imran Khan, and Majid Khan, all of whom are cousins of Bilal.

== Personal life ==
Bilal married Nabeela and has two sons, Arsalan Omer Khan, Ibrahim Omer Khan, and a daughter Zahra Omer Khan.

Once Bilal Omer, along with his wife and driver, experienced a car accident in Lahore Cantonment. The driver suffered a fatal heart attack and died at the scene. Bilal's swift action of moving from the backseat to the front prevented significant damage to the car and saved both his wife and himself.

Personally, Bilal enjoyed the games of Polo, Tennis, Squash, gaining recognition among peers and family for his skills as a player and was also known for his hunting abilities.

As President of Pakistan Polo Association and Equestrian Federation of Pakistan, he represented Pakistan at the 2007 Polo World Cup in New Zealand.

== Military career ==
Bilal was commissioned into the 19th Lancers on 27 October 1974, after graduating from the 50th course of the Pakistan Military Academy. On 8 July 1980, he was called back to the 23rd Division and relinquished the charge of General Staff Officer - Grade III at FC Baluchistan.

He graduated from the Command and Staff College Quetta in 1986 and later went to Saudi Arabia after completing mid-level infantry officers course. Afterwards, he received his Master of Arts in International relations from the University of Denver. As a lieutenant colonel, he was battalion commander of the 2nd Pakistan Battalion (Quaid-i-Azam's own).

On 16 January 2004, the Pakistan Army selection board reviewed 104 brigadiers and deemed 18 fit for promotion to Major General, including Bilal, constituting 2.2% of those commissioned in 1974–75.

Major General Bilal placed a floral wreath at the Tomb of Allama Iqbal to pay homage to the great poet-philosopher of the East on Defence Day 2004. Notably, he welcomed Chief of the Turkish General Staff Hilmi Özkök and a delegation at the Allama Iqbal International Airport on 8 March 2005.

On 23 August 2005, as the GOC 10 Division, Bilal was the chief guest at the Pakistan Cricket Board and Pepsi National School Cricket Tournament, where Ibrahim Ali Bhai School Karachi competed against Government High School Nanakpura Peshawar.

On 5 April 2008, as Director General Operations and Planning, Major General Bilal Omer Khan and other senior officials of the Joint Staff Headquarters welcomed Chairman Joint Chiefs of Staff Committee Tariq Majid at the Islamabad Airport.

== Death ==
On 4 December 2009, a terrorist attack occurred at the Parade Lane Mosque while Bilal and other worshippers were praying namaz. During the attack, Bilal's son, Arsalan, says Bilal tried to disarm one of the terrorists, allowing others to escape. In an interview, Arsalan shared that the neighbor's driver told him about General Bilal grappling with the terrorist's gun. Bilal reportedly exclaimed, "Are you going to kill kids?" He mentioned that his father was shot in the neck from behind by another terrorist at point blank range and grenade shrapnel was later discovered in his legs.

Arsalan further told The Express Tribune, "when I went to recover my father's body from the mosque, I saw my father lay there with his hand under his head as though he was in a peaceful slumber." Bilal is buried at the Westridge Army Graveyard in Rawalpindi.

== Legacy ==
Bilal Omer Shaheed Colony - Parade Lane, Major General Bilal Omer Shaheed Tennis Championship, and Maj. Gen. Bilal Omer Khan Shaheed Memorial Polo Cup 2009 held from 29 December 2009 to 3 January 2010, are all named after him.

== Awards & Decorations ==
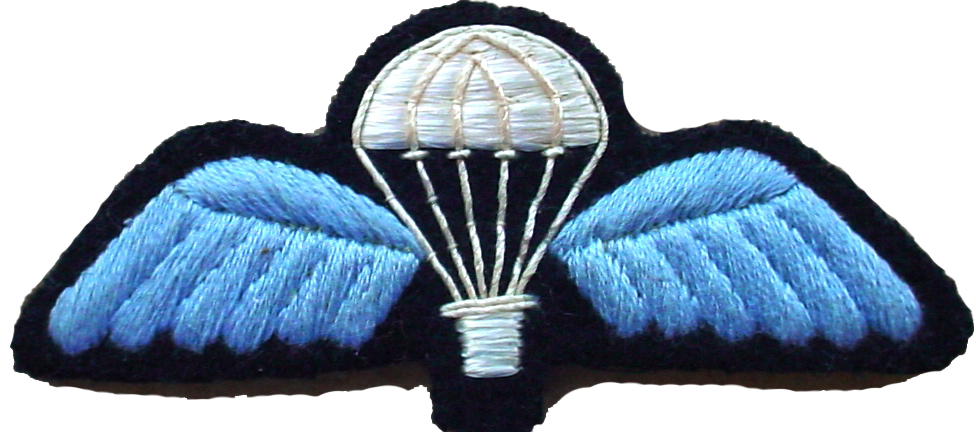

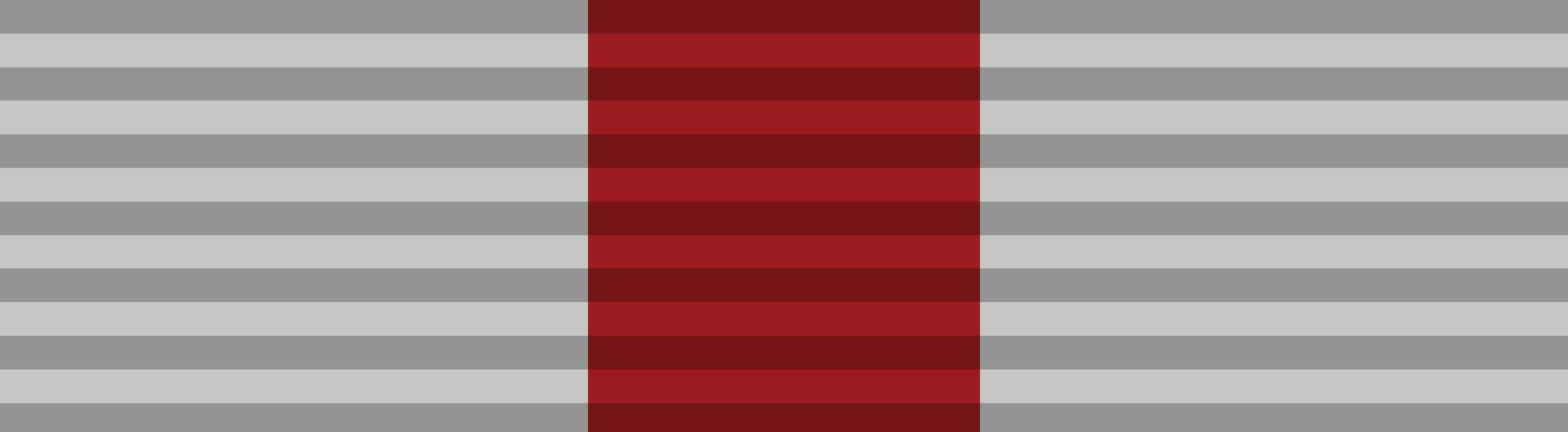

Parachutist Badge
| Hilal-i-Imtiaz (Military) (Crescent of Excellence) 2006 | | Sitara-e-Basalat (Star of Valour); Posthumously; 2010 | |
| Tamgha-e-Baqa (Nuclear Test Medal) 1998 | Tamgha-e-Istaqlal Pakistan (Escalation with India Medal) 2002 | 10 Years Service Medal | 20 Years Service Medal |
| 30 Years Service Medal | 35 Years Service Medal | Tamgha-e-Sad Saala Jashan-e-Wiladat-e-Quaid-e-Azam (100th Birth Anniversary of Muhammad Ali Jinnah) 1976 | Hijri Tamgha (Hijri Medal) 1979 |
| Tamgha-e-Jamhuriat (Democracy Medal) 1988 | Qarardad-e-Pakistan Tamgha (Resolution Day) (Golden Jubilee Medal) 1990 | Tamgha-e-Salgirah Pakistan (Independence Day Golden Jubilee Medal) 1997 | Command and Staff College Quetta Centenary Student's Medal |
