= Ikramullah Khan Niazi =

Pakistani civil engineer (1922-2008)

- اکرام اللہ خان نیازی
- Born: 24 April 1922; Mianwali, British India
- Died: 19 March 2008 (aged 85); Lahore, Pakistan
- Resting place: Mianwali, Pakistan
- Education: Punjab College of Engineering and Technology (B.A.); Imperial College London (B.Sc. Engg., DIC and M.Sc. Engg.)
- Spouse: Shaukat Khanum
- Children: 5, including Imran Khan
- Relatives: Hafeez Ullah Niazi (nephew); Najeebullah Khan Niazi (nephew); Irfan Ullah Khan Niazi (nephew); Inamullah Niazi (nephew)

Ikramullah Khan Niazi (Note: Urdu: اکرام اللہ خان نیازی) (24 April 1922 – 19 March 2008) also known as Ikramullah Niazi, was a Pakistani civil engineer, philanthropist, and board member of the Shaukat Khanum Memorial Cancer Hospital & Research Centre (SKMCH&RC) which was founded in honour of his wife, Shaukat Khanum, by their only son, Imran Khan.

== Early life ==
Ikramullah Khan was born in Mianwali into a Niazi Pashtun family on 24 April 1922. His father, Muhammad Azeem Khan Niazi, was a physician. Their haveli (mansion), known as Azeem Manzil, is located in Shermankhel Mahallah, Mianwali.

He received his early education in Lahore and graduated from the Punjab College of Engineering and Technology with a Bachelor of Arts.

He graduated from Imperial College London in 1946 with a Bachelor of Engineering degree and a Diploma of Imperial College. He later earned a Master of Science in engineering from the same institution.

Ikramullah was a staunch supporter of the Pakistan Movement during the days of the British Raj. His son Imran, described him as "fiercely anti-colonial" and remembered that he would tell off local waiters at the Lahore Gymkhana Club who would speak to him in English.

== Civil engineering career ==
In 1951, Ikramullah established the Republic Engineering Corporation as a Firm of Consulting Engineers and Planners, with its head office based in Lahore.

For the years 1960-1961, Ikramullah was a member of the West Pakistan Engineering Congress. He was also a member of the Institution of Mechanical Engineers (IMechE) and a Fellow of the Institution of Engineers (Pakistan).

According to the March 1976 edition of the Quarterly Journal of the Pakistan Engineering Congress, Ikramullah Niazi had acquired more than 30 years of professional engineering experience. His career included 16 years with the Communication and Works Department, where he served as Assistant Executive Engineer, Executive Engineer, and Superintending Engineer. He sought retirement in 1959.

In those roles, he was responsible for the design, planning, and supervision of numerous highway, building, water supply, and drainage projects. He also played a key role in reorganising the Buildings and Road Research Laboratory in Lahore. The journal noted that he founded the Republic Engineering Corporation Limited in 1962 and had been serving as its principal engineer for the past 14 years. His primary area of expertise was soil mechanics with the journal adding that he possessed extensive experience in highway design.

A February 1977 declassified cable from the American Consulate in Lahore, sent to Washington, D.C., as well as the American Consulate in Karachi and the American Embassy in Islamabad, reported that Ikramullah Niazi’s firm had a good reputation.

The cable noted that the firm was involved in a range of major engineering projects such as:

planning and preparation of project with estimated cost of DOLS60 million under Salinity Control and Reclamation Project (SCARP) for Water and Power Development Authority (WAPDA); complete design and supervision of construction of six rice mills, a textile mill, Italian Chancery Building, Electrical Engineering Department of Engineering University, Arts Council's Auditorium (estimated cost of these buildings is DOLS 60 million). Survey, design and supervision of construction for 170-km on Indus Super Highway, etc. Company is associated with foreign organizations including Checchi and Co. of Washington, D.C., and collaborates with them on projects on a case-to-case basis. Company is reported to be in negotiation with the Saudi Arabian government for providing its services.

The cable also stated: "Company's directorate including Ikramullah are reported highly qualified and well experienced professional engineers. Eighty percent of its staff qualified and experienced professionals, remaining twenty percent is unskilled office staff. Considered suitable for trade contacts."

== Personal life ==
He had three brothers.

He married Shaukat Khanum and they had five children: four daughters and one son, Imran Khan.

== Later life and death ==
He was also a philanthropist, founding a charity called the Pakistan Educational Society which funded the university education of underprivileged but talented children. He also served as a board member of the Shaukat Khanum Memorial Cancer Hospital & Research Centre (SKMCH&RC) in his later years. He died on 19 March 2008 at the age of 85 from pneumonia for which he was being treated for at SKMCH&RC.

His funeral prayers were led by Qazi Hussain Ahmad. He is buried at the family's ancestral graveyard in Mianwali next to his parents.
