= Ahmed Raza (civil servant) =

Pakistani cricketer (1910–1996)

Ahmed Raza Khan
- احمد رضا خان
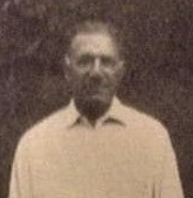
- Portrait, c. 1960s

Deputy Commissioner, Deputy Rehabilitation Commissioner and Deputy Settlement Commissioner of Lahore
- In office 1 October 1959 – 15 September 1962

Chief Administrator of the Corporation of the City of Lahore
- In office January 1957 – 1958

Under Secretary Government of Punjab
- In office 1948–1952

Personal details
- Born: 20 August 1910 Jullundur, Punjab Province (British India)
- Died: 21 December 1996 (aged 86) Zaman Park, Pakistan
- Spouse: Rufi Habibullah (m. 1936)
- Children: 3
- Education: University of the Punjab (B.A.)
- Nickname(s): Aghajan; Agha Ahmed Raza; Khan Ahmed Raza Khan
- Cricket career

Personal information
- Batting: Right-handed
- Bowling: Right-arm medium pace
- Relatives: Humayun Zaman (cousin); Khaled Ahmed (cousin); Wajid Ali Khan Burki (brother-in-law); Javed Burki (nephew); Asad Jahangir Khan (nephew); Majid Khan (nephew); Imran Khan (nephew); Ijaz Khan (nephew)

Domestic team information
- Years: Team
- 1928/29: Muslims
- 1934/35–1945/46: Northern India
- 1947/48–1960/61: Punjab Governor's XI (Pakistan)
- 1951/52: Punjab (Pakistan)

Career statistics
Competition	FC
Matches	15
Runs scored	597
Batting average	28.42
100s/50s	1/4
Top score	101
Catches/stumpings	8/–
- Source: ESPNcricinfo, 10 January 2024

Khan Ahmed Raza Khan (Note: Urdu: خان احمد رضا خان) (20 August 1910 — 21 December 1996), known as Aghajan, was a Pakistani civil servant, hockey player, tennis player, football player, first-class cricketer, and colour holder of the Punjab University cricket team.

Throughout his career, Khan held the positions of Extra Assistant Commissioner of Gujrat, Deputy Provincial Superintendent of Census Punjab & Bahawalpur state, Deputy Commissioner of Jhelum and Lahore, Deputy Rehabilitation Commissioner and Deputy Settlement Commissioner of Lahore, President Lahore District Volleyball Association, President District Football Association of Lahore, Vice President Lahore Zone Hockey Association, Secretary Lahore Division Cricket Association, President Central Zone Cycling Association and national selector on the Board of Control for Cricket in Pakistan.

== Early life ==
Agha Ahmed Raza Khan was born on 20 August 1910 in Basti Nau, Jullundur, into a noble Burki Sunni Pashtun family originally from Kaniguram. His father, Khan Bahadur Khan Ahmad Hasan Khan, was a district judge and politician who served as British India's representative to the League of Nations and District Commissioner Mianwali. His mother was Amir Bano. Ahmad Hasan Khan hosted Muhammad Ali Jinnah at their home Basti Pathan (lit. Pathan Colony) in Jullundur.

Ahmed was one of many men of the Burki tribe to play first-class cricket. His three sisters were the mothers of Pakistan's Test cricket captains. Iqbal Bano was the mother of Javed Burki, Mubarak Khanum was the mother of Majid Khan, and Shaukat Khanum was the mother of Imran Khan.

== Personal life ==
Extra Assistant Commissioner of Gujrat Ahmed Raza Khan married Rufi Habibullah on 8 November 1936 in Lahore. Rufi was the daughter of Khan Bahadur Sardar Habibullah Mokal from Lahore, an elected member of the Punjab Legislative Council and former Deputy President of the council. Rufi received her education at Queen Mary College, Lahore.

They have three children: two sons, Farooq Ahmed Khan and Farrukh Ahmed Khan, and a daughter, Noshi Khan. Both sons played first-class cricket in Pakistan. Farooq retired as a Brigadier in the Pakistan Army, while Farrukh became a urologist after studying at King Edward Medical College. Their daughter, Dr. Noshi Khan, earned a PhD in home economics. In 1969, she married provincial minister Sardar Arif Rashid, the son of Sardar Rashid Ahmed Mokal.

In March 1965, Ahmed took his 12-year-old nephew, Imran Khan, to Rawalpindi to watch a cricket match between Pakistan and New Zealand. Imran's two cousins, Majid Khan and Javed Burki, were both playing in the match. Ahmed would often tell his friends that one day Imran Khan too would play for Pakistan, with Imran later writing, "I never forgot that moment, for me his words were gospel."

In his civil service profile, Ahmed's hobby was listed as shooting.

== Cricket career ==
Ahmed made his debut in first-class cricket for Muslims against Punjab Governor's XI at Lawrence Gardens in Lahore, in March 1929. His highest first-class score was 101 in 1934–35 in Northern India's first match in the Ranji Trophy, when he added 304 for the second wicket with George Abell. In March 1935, playing for Northern India against Bombay during the Ranji Trophy tournament, he scored 50 in the first innings and 62 not out in the second.

== Civil service ==
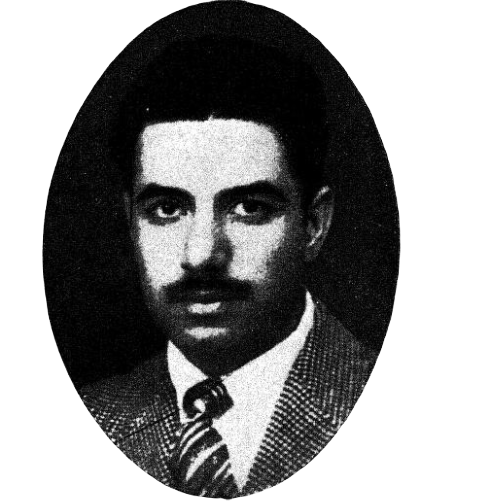
Portrait, c. 1930s

Ahmed joined the government service on 10 November 1934 and served in various districts of Punjab Province (British India).

While holidaying in Kashmir with his family to escape the summer heat, the Partition of British India occurred and he opted for Pakistan, ultimately moving to Zaman Park. He transferred his civil service and served as Under Secretary Government of Punjab, Pakistan from 1948 to 1952, and for two months in 1951 he served as Deputy Provincial Superintendent of Punjab and Bahawalpur state where he inspected field work at several places. Ahmed was promoted to Deputy Commissioner in 1953 and held the position of Chief Administrator of the Corporation of the city of Lahore from 1956 to 1958. He received training from the United Kingdom in 1958 under the Colombo Plan.

== Death ==
Ahmed died at his residence in Zaman Park on 21 December 1996.
