= Sherandaz Khan =

Pakistani cricketer

Personal information
- Full name: Sherandaz Khan Burki
- Born: 7 March 1943 (age 83); Jullundur, Punjab Province, British India
- Batting: Right-handed
- Bowling: Right-arm medium-fast
- Relatives: Baqa Jilani (uncle); Imran Khan (cousin)

Domestic team information
- Years: Team
- 1961-62 to 1962-63, 1964-65 to 1976-77: Sargodha
- 1963-64: Rawalpindi

Career statistics
Competition	FC
Matches	40
Runs scored	1,278
Batting average	18.79
100s/50s	0/5
Top score	78
Balls bowled	3,846
Wickets	84
Bowling average	21.80
5 wickets in innings	3
10 wickets in match	1
Best bowling	7/31
Catches/stumpings	44/–
- Source: Cricinfo, 31 August 2017

Sherandaz Khan (born 7 March 1943) is a former cricketer who played first-class cricket in Pakistan from 1961 to 1977.

A distant cousin of Imran Khan, Sherandaz Khan was an all-rounder who opened the bowling and usually batted in the middle order. He made his first-class debut for Sargodha against Peshawar in the Quaid-e-Azam Trophy in 1961-62. It was also Sargodha's first-class debut. Khan took 4 for 7 in Peshawar's first innings, and Sargodha won by an innings.

Khan continued to play for Sargodha, and was instrumental in their second first-class victory, which came in 1969-70 against Lahore A. In the first innings he dismissed Imran Khan, who was making his first-class debut, and went on to take 4 for 55 and 7 for 31 in the match, which Sargodha won by five wickets. In the final of the Punjab Tournament in 1975-76 he top-scored in each innings for Sargodha, scoring 78 and 36, but Lahore won easily.
