= Asad Jahangir =

Pakistani cricketer

Asad Jahangir Khan
- اسد جہانگیر خان

23rd and 30th Inspector General Sindh Police
- In office 9 February 2005 – 24 December 2005
- In office 22 August 1997 – 25 November 1997

8th Head of Traffic Police (Punjab)
- In office March 1986 – December 1986
- Preceded by: Fazal Mahmood

Personal details
- Born: 25 December 1945 (age 80) Campbellpur, Punjab Province (British India)
- Parent: Jahangir Khan (father)
- Relatives: Majid Khan (brother); Imran Khan (cousin); Javed Burki (cousin); Humayun Zaman (uncle); Ahmed Raza (uncle)
- Education: Aitchison College; University of the Punjab; Keble College, Oxford
- Awards: Oxford Blue (1968 and 1969)
- Cricket career

Cricket information
- Batting: Right-handed
- Bowling: Right-arm off-spin

Domestic team information
- Years: Team
- 1964/65: Lahore Reds
- 1965/66: Punjab University
- 1967/69: Oxford University
- 1968: Oxford and Cambridge Universities; Oxford University Past and Present
- 1969/70: Lahore A
- 1969/70: Punjab Governor's XI
- 1970/71: Lahore Greens

Career statistics
Competition	First-class
Matches	40
Runs scored	1,154
Batting average	19.55
100s/50s	0/4
Top score	92
Balls bowled	3,847
Wickets	53
Bowling average	38.30
5 wickets in innings	2
10 wickets in match	0
Best bowling	7/84
Catches/stumpings	43/–
- Source: Cricinfo, 7 January 2024

Asad Jahangir Khan (Note: اسد جہانگیر خان) (born 25 December 1945) is a Pakistani former first-class cricketer and retired police officer. He specialised in traffic policing and held the positions of Head of Traffic Police (Punjab), CCPO Karachi, Additional IG Sindh Police, and Inspector General of the Sindh Police, before retiring in 2005.

In 2017, he served on the governing body of the Sindh Police Museum. In 2019, he chaired a sub-committee, including former and current inspector-generals, that prepared a report on police reform.

== Cricket career ==
The son of Jahangir Khan and the elder brother of Majid Khan, Asad Jahangir Khan made his first-class debut in the 1964–65 season while studying at the University of the Punjab. He went to Keble College, Oxford in 1966, and played for the university team from 1967 to 1969. His best season was 1968, when he took 41 wickets with his off-spin in 14 matches, at an average of 28.80.

Playing for an Oxford and Cambridge XI against the touring Australians in May 1968, he took 7 for 84, including the wickets of Bill Lawry, Ian Chappell and Bob Cowper. Earlier that month he had taken 5 for 44 against Warwickshire, including the wickets of Rohan Kanhai and John Jameson. In the next match, opening the batting with Fred Goldstein against Somerset, he made 50 not out in an unbroken partnership of 148.

In 1969, his bowling fell away (three wickets in six matches) but he made 280 runs at 31.11, including his highest score of 92 against D.H. Robins' XI. A week earlier he made 81 not out against Kent to take Oxford to a one-wicket victory with a ball to spare.

Khan returned to Pakistan and played a few matches for Lahore cricket teams in 1969–70 and 1970–71. His last first-class match was a semi-final of the Quaid-e-Azam Trophy in February 1971, playing for Lahore Greens, when he took 3 for 157 off 52 overs against Karachi Blues.

== Publications ==
Asad Jahangir Khan (1 March 2002). "Traffic Law Enforcement on Motorway". National Institute of Management.

Asad Jahangir; et al. (May 2008). "Report of the National Commission for Government Reforms on Reforming the Government of Pakistan" (PDF).

Asad Jahangir Khan (16 October 2012). "Dispute resolution". Dawn.

Asad Jahangir Khan (27 May 2013). "Road Safety Karachi-2012". Forum Police Reforms. Archived from the original on 16 April 2014.
