= Bazid Khan =

Pakistani cricketer and commentator (born 1981)

Personal information
- Born: 25 March 1981 (age 45); Lahore, Punjab, Pakistan
- Batting: Right-handed
- Bowling: Right-arm off break
- Relatives: Jahangir Khan (grandfather); Majid Khan (father)

International information
- National side: Pakistan (2004–2008)
- Only Test (cap 185): 25 May 2005 v West Indies
- ODI debut (cap 151): 30 September 2004 v Zimbabwe
- Last ODI: 16 April 2008 v Bangladesh

Career statistics
Competition	Test	ODI	FC	LA
Matches	1	5	151	112
Runs scored	32	131	7,647	3,983
Batting average	16.00	26.20	36.41	44.25
100s/50s	0/0	0/2	15/39	5/33
Top score	23	66	300*	116
Balls bowled	–	12	612	485
Wickets	–	–	5	7
Bowling average	–	–	64.00	59.00
5 wickets in innings	–	–	0	0
10 wickets in match	–	–	0	0
Best bowling	–	–	2/23	2/38
Catches/stumpings	2/–	1/–	143/–	54/–
- Source: CricInfo, 10 March 2013

Bazid Khan (born 25 March 1981) is a Pakistani cricket commentator and former cricketer. He played one Test match for Pakistan in 2005, and played first-class cricket in Pakistan from 1997–98 to 2012–13. In the 2021 edition of Wisden Cricketer's Almanack, he was retrospectively named as the Schools Cricketer of the Year for 1999 for his all-round performances for Brighton College.

== Early life and family ==
Hailing from Burki tribe of Pashtuns, Khan belongs to a famous cricketing family, with his grandfather Jahangir Khan having represented India before the independence of Pakistan in 1947 and his father Majid (both of whom were Cambridge Blues), and uncles Javed Burki and Imran Khan (a former Prime Minister of Pakistan) all having captained Pakistan.

Khan received his education from the Brighton College.

== Career ==
With a combination of an orthodox technique in batting and a reliably calm temperament, Khan began playing for the Pakistani Under-19s at the age of just 15, and moved to England to finish his cricketing and academic education. He played in the same Brighton College (where he studied between 1998 and 2000) team as Matt Prior when they won 20 matches in 1999, and also later played at the Marylebone Cricket Club.

Having enjoyed an excellent 2003–04 season, averaging over 70, Khan was finally given a chance to represent Pakistan in a triangular tournament early the following season. He has played seven youth Test matches, as well as a single senior Test, and made his Test debut in the 2nd Test against the West Indies, making the family the second, after the Headleys, to have grandfather, father and son as Test cricketers. In the 2004–05 Quaid-e-Azam Trophy, Khan scored 300 not out batting for Rawalpindi against Hyderabad.
