= S. M. Muneer =

Pakistani industrialist (1944/1945–2022)

S.M. Muneer SI
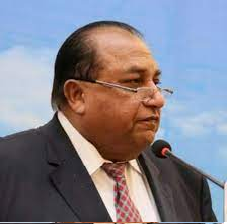
- Born: 1945
- Died: November 28, 2022 (aged 76–77); Karachi, Pakistan
- Occupation: Industrialist
- Organization(s): Patron-in-chief of Korangi Association of Trade and Industry (KATI)
- Title: Chairman, Chiniot Anjuman Islamia
- Board member of: President, Federation of Pakistan Chamber of Commerce & Industry (FPCCI); Member, Board of Governors of the Institute of Business Management; Member, Board of Governors of Greenwich University, Karachi; The Kidney Centre Post Graduate Training Institute; Shaukat Khanum Cancer Hospital
- Awards: Sitara-i-Eisaar (2006); Sitara-i-Imtiaz (2007)

S.M. Muneer (1945 – 28 November 2022) was a Pakistani industrialist who founded Din Group.

== Life ==
Muneer was born in 1945 in a Chinioti business family. He began his career at the age of 18 by joining his family business, Din Leather. Following Din Leather's bankruptcy in 1966, the family was forced to liquidate personal assets to settle creditors. Muneer initially considered seeking employment at Pakistan International Airlines but was encouraged by his father to continue his career as a businessman. He subsequently restarted operations by renting leather tanneries in Karachi and established his own factory in 1970.

In 1987, Muneer founded a spinning factory in Chunian, Lahore, which later expanded to include five spinning units with an installed capacity of 100,000 spindles. During the early 1990s, Muneer as part of the National Group acquired the Muslim Commercial Bank (now MCB Bank). He later served as the vice chairman of its board.

Muneer also served as patron-in-chief of Korangi Association of Trade and Industry. Additionally, he was a board member for various banks and private businesses and had ties to the leather trade. He also managed several hospitals, maternity homes, schools, and institutions in Karachi, Faisalabad, and Chiniot while serving as chairman of Chiniot Anjuman Islamia.

Muneer was a member of the Institute of Business Management, Greenwich University, Karachi, and the Federation of Pakistan Chambers of Commerce & Industry. He was on the boards of the Kidney Centre Post Graduate Training Institute and Shaukat Khanum Cancer Hospital in Lahore.

Muneer died on 28 November 2022, at the age of 77.

== Awards and honours ==
- Sitara-i-Eisaar (2006)
- Sitara-i-Imtiaz (2007)
