= Ijaz Khan (cricketer) =

Pakistani cricketer (1938–2019)

Personal information
- Full name: Ijaz Hussain Khan
- Born: 9 November 1938; Jullundur, British India
- Died: 27 June 2019 (aged 80); Pakistan
- Height: 6 ft 3 in (191 cm)
- Batting: Right-handed
- Bowling: Right arm offbreak
- Relatives: Imran Khan (cousin); Javed Burki (cousin); Majid Khan (cousin); Jahangir Khan (uncle)

Domestic team information
- Years: Team
- 1961/62: Lahore B
- 1962/63-1973/74: Pakistan Railways

Career statistics
Competition	First-class
Matches	22
Runs scored	356
Batting average	16.95
100s/50s	0
Top score	46
Balls bowled	2,977
Wickets	37
Bowling average	28.59
5 wickets in innings	1
10 wickets in match	0
Best bowling	5/53
Catches/stumpings	16/–

Ijaz Hussain Khan (Note: Urdu: اعجاز حسین خان) (9 November 1938 — 27 June 2019) known as Jahaz Khan, was a Pakistani first-class cricketer who played for Lahore and Pakistan Railways between 1961/62 and 1973/74. Ijaz was described as "the finest off-break bowler, I faced in my entire career" by his cousin Majid Khan, who was the leading Pakistan batsman of his era.

Ijaz Khan could not convince the BCCP selectors in the 1960s, for national recognition. Instead it was his rivals, Haseeb Ahsan, Afaq Hussain, Salahuddin and his Railways colleague, Mohammad Nazir Jr who got the nod. He was employed with the Pakistan Railways from 1958 to 1980.

== Early life and family ==
Ijaz Hussain Khan was born on 9 November 1938 in Basti Guzan Jullundur, one of Fazal Hussain Khan's four sons. They hail from the Burki family who is deeply rooted in cricket. The family's cricketing lineage traces back to Mahmood Khan, the brother of Ijaz's maternal grandmother, who played for FC College in the 1897-98 period. Ijaz's maternal uncle, Jahangir Khan, further contributed to the family's cricketing legacy by representing All-India in Test matches during the tours of England in 1932 and 1936.

His first cousins include Imran Khan, Javed Burki, and Majid Khan.

During the Partition of British India in August 1947, Ijaz attended Islamia High School in Jullundur as a Year 5 student. Following the partition, his family settled in Zaman Park. After spending two years at Iqbal High School Gari Shahoo, Ijaz enrolled at Muslim High School in Lahore Cantt. There, he was the captain of the cricket team and completed his matriculation in 1953.

== Career ==
Despite outperforming in inter-varsity cricket, Ijaz Khan was overlooked in favour of fellow off-spinner Abdul Aziz for the selection of the Pakistan Universities team against the 1955-56 MCC ‘A’ at Bagh-e-Jinnah, Lahore. However, seven years later, Ijaz made a mark in first-class cricket with an impressive all-round performance for Railways against Lahore A in the 1962-63 Quaid-e-Azam Trophy. Batting at No.9, he scored 46 and took 5–53 with the ball, which remained his best batting and bowling performances. At the same venue in the 1972-73 BCCP Patron's Trophy, he scored 45 in a partnership of 93 for the 8th wicket with Mohammad Nazir (63) against Karachi Greens.

Playing a pivotal role in Railways' historic triumph in the Quaid-e-Azam Trophy 1973/74, Ijaz Khan was part of a formidable four-pronged spin attack alongside Mohammad Nazir, Nazir Khan, and Ahad Khan under the captaincy of skipper Arif Butt. In the semi-final victory against Punjab, Ijaz contributed with bowling figures of 4–45 in the second innings at Railway Stadium, securing the win based on the first-innings lead.

== Death ==
He died on 27 June 2019 at the age of 80, and was survived by four sons.
