= Pets of Imran Khan =

Companion animals of Imran Khan

Imran Khan, the former Prime Minister of Pakistan, has owned five dogs at his residence in Bani Gala, Islamabad—Sheru, Sherni, Motu, Pidu, and Maximus—of which the last three are still alive. Khan also has chickens, water buffalo, and cows on his farmhouse property, which he raises for organic produce.

== Dogs ==
Khan's dogs have been a focus of interest in several media reports, and often find reference amongst journalists during his interviews. According to the Financial Times, a typical day in Khan's routine begins with breakfast, "walking the dogs and gathering his thoughts", and morning exercise. In a 2012 interview with Meher Bukhari, Khan mentioned that he kept dogs as a necessity, in order to guard his house. The dogs also accompany him during one of his favourite pastimes, hunting partridges. His keeping of dogs has been targeted by his political opponents; federal minister Khawaja Saad Rafique once berated Khan in parliament for his affection toward canines, and for allowing them inside his house, stating it was "against cultural/religious values." Rafique's statement elicited a rejoinder from many commentators such as Talat Farooq, Hamid Mir and Mubasher Lucman. Whilst addressing a crowd of supporters during the Azadi march on 14 September 2014, Khan pushed back at the remarks: "Sheru is dead, poor dog, I really liked him. He was much more loyal to me than these people (in the Assembly)." A day later, Rafique responded "Had I known that Sheru is no more, I wouldn't have said such a thing. I'm sure Imran Khan would have been hurt by my comments." The presence of Khan's dogs has been noted even during official meetings inside his house.

In April 2018, Khan said he had a total of five pet dogs.

Khan's dogs were covered in much detail by Reham in her 2018 autobiography, Reham Khan. Reham wrote that Pervez Musharraf had previously given several puppies to Imran Khan, and that Imran Khan was fond of "handsome dogs". Wikipedia's coverage of Khan's pets has also drawn much interest amongst newspapers.

Frank Huzur in Imran Versus Imran: The Untold Story wrote Imran Khan loved dogs since his childhood. And that his mother used to encourage him to play with all types of dogs. Shortly after he became premier, it was reported in the media that Khan's dog also accompanied him on his prime ministerial helicopter, during his daily commute from his residence to the prime minister's office.

=== Sheru ===
In 2011, Pervez Musharraf gave a puppy to Imran Khan before his self-imposed exile. The puppy was born at the Musharraf's farmhouse. Reham Khan claimed his name was Sheru an Alsatian.

In September 2014, Imran Khan in a TV talk show revealed that Sheru had died three months earlier. However, in April 2018, reports and social media rumours emerged that Khan had removed Sheru from his Bani Gala house on the advice of his third wife Bushra Maneka. According to local media, a new quarter was being built for the dog within Khan's premises but outside the main residence building, as his wife was not comfortable with pet animals inside the house. However, Khan during a press conference denied the media reports lightheartedly, and said Sheru had died three to four years ago.

Imran Khan used to call him "tiger". Sheru literally means 'lion'.

=== Sherni ===
Sherni was a Kuchi dog, who died while living at Khan's Bani Gala house. Sherni means 'Lioness'.

=== Motu ===
Motu is an offspring of Sheru and Khan's late Kuchi breed, Sherni.

In April 2018, the dogs had reportedly been blamed for a spat between Imran Khan and his third wife Bushra Maneka. According to the reports, the dogs were causing unease and disturbance for Bushra during her religious activities and she allegedly left Bani Gala for her family home following the spat. The rumors, which originally circulated on the Daily Ummat newspaper, were refuted by both Khan and his wife. Reham Khan said "I suspect it could be Motu that is causing disturbance. But then, Motu is not really an indoor type".

Imran Khan denied the rumours that Motu was removed from the Bani Gala premises. As of April 2018, Motu was living in Imran Khan's Bani Gala house. Motu literally translates to 'fatty'. In her first television interview as First Lady with Nadeem Malik, Bushra refuted reports about her not being fond of Khan's dogs and mentioned that she herself in fact took care of Motu.

=== Pidu ===
Pidu's ears had been removed at birth. Pidu means 'shorty'.

=== Maximus ===
Maximus (also nicknamed Hugo Maximus or Max), a Belgian Shepherd, was brought by Reham Khan from the United Kingdom to Bani Gala after her marriage with Imran Khan. The dog remained Imran Khan's favourite during his stay at Bani Gala. Maximus reportedly left Bani Gala after the divorce of Imran and Reham.

== Other animals ==
Khan also rears his own chickens, water buffalo and cows on his 35-acre farmhouse property, and uses their organic produce such as milk, meat and eggs. During her marriage to Imran, Jemima Khan had acknowledged the couple owning two dogs, in addition to chickens and a goat "so we can have free-range eggs and meat from the garden." A 1996 news piece described one of his hounds as a "boisterous guard dog", also nicknamed Tiger. Tiger had been acquired from Waziri tribesmen during one of Imran's trips to the northwestern tribal areas.

Khan's dogs found a mention in Michael Palin's 2004 book Himalaya, when the latter interviewed him at his house and was greeted by "three amiable dogs... tails wagging vigorously, until that becomes too much of an effort and they collapse, bellies flat against warm stones or on their backs in the shade of the verandah, legs spread-eagled in abandon." Palin describes one of the dogs as a Labrador.

In his book Pakistan: A Personal History, Khan notes:

I am a completely outdoor person; I have always been – even as a boy during the hot summer months in Lahore my mother had trouble making me stay indoors. Since 2005 I have lived in a farmhouse on a hill outside the capital city, Islamabad, a place I call my paradise, recreating the sense of wilderness that I love. I am surrounded by hills and greenery with a panoramic view of Rawal Lake and the foothills of the Himalayas. I grow my own fruit and vegetables and keep chickens, cows and water buffaloes. Wild birds and animals surround me too – partridges, porcupines, snakes, lizards, jackals and peacocks.

In his assets declaration in 2017, Khan listed himself as an owner of four goats worth Rs. 0.2 million (US$720).

== See also ==
- Family of Imran Khan
- Pets of Vladimir Putin
- United States presidential pets
