= Sindh Police Museum =

Museum in Karachi, Pakistan

- سندھ پولیس میوزیم
- Established: 2019
- Location: Sindh Police Headquarters, Garden Road, Civil Lines, Karachi, Sindh, Pakistan
- Coordinates: 24.8690°N 67.0218°E
- Type: Law enforcement museum
- Owner: Sindh Police
- Website: sindhpolice.gov.pk/spm

The Sindh Police Museum is a museum in Karachi, Pakistan. It is housed in the Sindh Police main headquarters in Karachi.

The museum was opened in 2019.

== Collection ==
The museum's layout includes several distinct sections: a photo gallery, the Marston gallery, an artifacts section, a uniforms section, and an auditorium. The photo gallery provides a chronological visual narrative from 1843 to 1970, featuring a variety of photographs such as British-era police officers, police in 18th and 19th-century attire, the inaugural Muslim ASP, and the first kotwal of Lahore. A significant photograph documents Muhammad Ali Jinnah receiving a guard of honor from the Sindh Police at the State Bank of Pakistan building's inauguration.

The antiques section displays various police uniforms and swords from the Sindh Police's historic armory. The exhibit also highlights the role of police puggies (Khoji), whose testimonies were legally admissible in criminal cases, and they were often rewarded for aiding in crime resolution.

The museum also features vintage communication tools, including telephone sets used by the Sindh Police. A collection of medals awarded for police service is on display, encompassing a medal from Queen Elizabeth II's coronation, along with other commemorative medals and ceremonial shields. A photograph of a vintage 4-cylinder Ford car and its purchase record is also presented.

Additional historical artifacts include 175-year-old cannons from the Talpur era, guns from 1857, FIRs lodged 139 years prior, orders from 175 years ago for maintaining peace during Muharram, and more. These exhibits provide a comprehensive overview of the history of policing in Pakistan.
