= Ormur =

Iranic tribe

The Ormur (Pashto: اورمړ), also known as Burki or Baraki (Pashto: برکي), are an Eastern Iranic people mainly living in Baraki Barak in the Logar Province of Afghanistan, and in Kaniguram in the South Waziristan District and Peshawar (Ormur, Peshawar) in Pakistan. Today they generally identify as Pashtuns.

== Language ==
Ormuri is the first language of the Ormurs living in Kaniguram and its vicinity in South Waziristan, and in Baraki Barak. Today, the population is bilingual in the local Pashto dialect of Waziristani.

== Notable people ==
- Pir Roshan
- Bilal Omer Khan
- Imran Khan
- Javed Burki
- Ijaz Khan (cricketer)
- Jamshed Burki
- Ahmed Raza (civil servant)
- Humayun Zaman
- Wajid Ali Khan Burki
- Jahangir Khan (cricketer)
- Majid Khan (cricketer)
- Babar Zaman
- Saleem Burki
