= Shahid Javed Burki =

Pakistani economist and writer

- شاہد جاوید برکی

Chairman Burki Institute of Public Policy
- Incumbent
- Assumed office 2007

Finance Minister of Pakistan (de facto)
- In office 11 November 1996 – 17 February 1997
- President: Farooq Leghari
- Prime Minister: Malik Meraj Khalid
- Preceded by: Naveed Qamar
- Succeeded by: Sartaj Aziz

Vice President World Bank
- In office 1994–1999

Personal details
- Born: Shahid Javed Burki; 14 November 1938 (age 87) Shimla, Punjab, British India
- Party: Independent
- Relatives: Javed Burki (cousin)
- Education: GCU, Lahore (BSc); University of Punjab (MSc); Christ Church, Oxford (MA); Harvard University
- Profession: Economist; Social Scientist

Shahid Javed Burki (Urdu: شاہد جاوید برکی) (born 14 September 1938) is a Pakistani-American professional economist who has served as Vice President of the World Bank and as the de-facto Finance Minister of Pakistan on a caretaker basis. He has written extensively on economic development and on the political history of Pakistan.

== Early life and education ==
Burki was born on 14 September 1938, in Simla in the Punjab Province of British India (now in Himachal Pradesh, India) into a Punjabi-Pathan family of the Burki tribe. Burki's family migrated to Pakistan at the time of the Partition of India in September 1947. They settled in Rawalpindi, where his father worked as an official in the Pakistan army headquarters. Burki is a cousin of the cricketer Javed Burki.

Burki was educated at Presentation Convent High School, Rawalpindi and St Mary's College, Rawalpindi. Upon graduation he moved to Lahore to study double majors in Physics and Mathematics at Government College University, Lahore. He received his MSc in Physics from the Punjab University in 1959. The following year he was chosen as a Rhodes Scholar from Pakistan and went to Christ Church, Oxford to study economics. He received his MA from Oxford in 1963 and then went to Harvard University as a Mason Fellow for graduate studies in Economics and Public Administration. He holds dual Pakistani and US nationality.

== Career at World Bank ==
Burki joined the World Bank in 1974 as a Senior Economist and went on to serve in several senior positions. He was the (first) Director of the China Department (1987–1994), making him responsible for managing the World Bank's dialogue with the Chinese authorities and supervising all of the Bank's analytical and lending work in China. He persuaded the World Bank's senior management, in the immediate aftermath of the Chinese authorities' repression of the Tiananmen Square protests of 1989, that the Bank should stay actively engaged with China, a stance challenged at the time by many of the Bank's most powerful shareholder countries. He served as the Regional Vice President for Latin America and the Caribbean during 1994–1999.

He took a leave of absence from the World Bank to serve in a caretaker role as Pakistan's de facto Finance Minister for 67 days in 1996–1997 (exercising the responsibilities of the Finance Minister without assuming the title). He retired from the World Bank in 1999 after 25 years of service there.

== Publications ==
Burki is the author or editor of several books on Pakistan, including: Pakistan Under Bhutto (1980, Palgrave Macmillan); Pakistan under the Military: Eleven Years of Zia Ul-Haq (with Craig Baxter, 1991, Westview Press); Pakistan: Fifty Years of Nationhood (1999, Westview Press); A Historical Dictionary of Pakistan (1999, Scarecrow Press); and Changing Perceptions, Altered Reality: Pakistan's Economy under Musharraf, 1999–2006 (2007, Oxford University Press, Karachi). Other publications on development include: A Study of Chinese Communes (1969, Harvard University Press); First Things First (with Paul Streeten, 1981, Oxford University Press); and Transforming Socialist Economies: Lessons from Cuba and Beyond (edited, with Daniel P. Erikson, 2005, Palgrave Macmillan).

== Other activities ==
In the past, Burki has written opinion pieces for the Pakistani newspaper Dawn. He is currently a frequent contributor of opinion pieces to the Daily Times.

Burki is the Chairman of The Shahid Javed Burki Institute of Public Policy at NetSol (BIPP) in Lahore, Pakistan.

Political offices
Preceded by Naveed Qamar	Finance Minister of Pakistan (de facto); 1996–1997	Succeeded by Sartaj Aziz
