= Jamshed Burki =

Pakistani former military officer and civil servant (born 1936)

Captain Jamshed Burki
- جمشید برکی
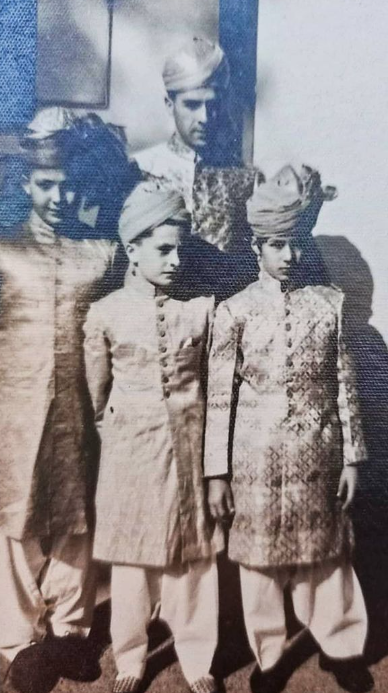
- Jamshed at his wedding, Imran Khan is on the right (1962)

Interior Secretary of Pakistan
- In office 13 August 1990 – 1995
- Prime Minister: Ghulam Mustafa Jatoi (caretaker); Nawaz Sharif; Moeenuddin Ahmad Qureshi (caretaker); Benazir Bhutto
- Succeeded by: Ilyas H. Mohsin

Deputy and Relief Commissioner, Malakand Division
- In office 7 July 1974 – 1 June 1977
Other civil service positions
Deputy Commissioner, Sargodha
In office
22 March 1969 – February 1971
Deputy Commissioner, Quetta
In office
19 June 1967 – 21 March 1969

Personal details
- Born: 1 August 1936 (age 89) Jullundur, British India
- Spouse: Abida Khanem (m. 1962)
- Children: 2
- Parent: Wajid Ali Khan Burki (father)
- Relatives: Javed Burki (brother); Majid Khan (cousin); Imran Khan (cousin); Humayun Zaman (uncle); Jahangir Khan (uncle)
- Education: St Mary's Cambridge High School; Pakistan Military Academy; National School of Public Policy
- Known for: Hostage release efforts during the 1994 Peshawar school bus hijacking

Military service
- Branch/service: Pakistan Army
- Years of service: 1956–1961
- Rank: Captain
- Unit: 5th Horse (Probyn's Horse) (1956); Guides Infantry (1956) (Note: 2/Lt Jamshed transferred from the 5th Horse to Guides Infantry on 15 August 1956.)

Jamshed Burki (Note: Urdu: جمشید برکی) (born 1 August 1936) is a Pakistani former military officer and retired Grade 22 civil servant of the District Management Group. As the Interior Secretary of Pakistan, Burki was responsible for the hostage release from the Afghan Embassy during the 1994 Peshawar school bus hijacking after Major General Babar opposed military action and withdrew from the scene. Burki and Lt. General Ghulam Malik then ordered the assault on the three hostage takers resulting in their deaths.

== Early life and education ==
Jamshed Burki was born on 1 August 1936 in Jullundur into a Burki-speaking Pashtun family. His parents were Wajid Ali Khan Burki and Iqbal Bano Khanum. He has two sisters and two brothers, Javed Burki and Dr. Nausherwan Burki. His cousins are legendary cricketers Majid Khan and Imran Khan.

He received his early education at St Mary's Cambridge High School with his brother Javed Burki, Gohar Ayub Khan, Akhtar Ayub Khan, Asif Nawaz Janjua, and Tariq Afridi the son of Lt General Mohammad Yousuf.

== Personal life ==
Jamshed Burki married Abida Khanem, the daughter of Gulzar Mohammad Khan of Lahore, on 3 December 1962. The luncheon was attended by President Ayub Khan, Governor Amir Mohammad Khan, General Musa Khan, Speaker of the National Assembly Maulvi Tamizuddin Khan, and others. They have two children, a son and daughter.

== Military career ==
Jamshed Burki took the Senior Cambridge exam and Intermediate exam at the Pakistan Military Academy and was commissioned from the Academy as a Armoured Corps officer in the 5th Horse (Probyn's Horse) in 1956. As a Second Lieutenant, he joined the Guides Infantry on transfer in August 1956.

== Civil service career ==
Jamshed Burki began his career as Additional Assistant Commissioner in Kohat, serving from 18 October 1956 to 11 February 1957. He then took on multiple roles in Abbottabad from 12 June 1957 to 15 January 1958, including Assistant Commissioner, Administrator of the Municipal Committee, and Assistant Rehabilitation Commissioner. He also served in Khanewal, first as Sub Divisional Officer from 16 January 1958 to 30 March 1959, and simultaneously as Registration Officer from 1 March 1958 to 30 March 1959. His next posting was as Political Agent in Quetta, where he served from 31 March 1959 to 8 June 1960.

After the 1958 Pakistani coup d'état, 272 military officers were rapidly appointed to civil service positions. By the end of 1959, only 53 of these officers, including Jamshed Burki, remained in their civilian roles.

Burki became Deputy Secretary to the Government of West Pakistan in Lahore from 16 June 1960 to 2 March 1961. He officially joined the District Management Group of Pakistan on 18 January 1961 or 18 November 1961.

He was the Assistant Director Bureau of National Research and Reference in 1961. On 30 March 1961, he officially took charge as the political agent of Chagai District until 10 October 1962.

On 11 October 1962, he was posted as Deputy Secretary Education in Lahore. From 16 May 1963 to 8 August 1963, he went to the United Kingdom for higher studies. He returned to Pakistan in October and was appointed as Assistant Political Agent in Sibi in November 1963.

He was appointed Deputy Commissioner Quetta on 19 June 1967 serving until 21 March 1969. The next day, he was posted as the Deputy Commissioner of Sargodha. He succeeded Wazir Zada Abdul Qayyum Khan as the Political Agent of Khyber on 9 March 1971 serving until 6 April 1973, when he was succeeded by Muhammad Afzal Khan.

Burki served as Deputy Commissioner and Relief Commissioner of Malakand Division from 7 July 1974 to 1 June 1977. During this tenure, the 1974 Pattan earthquake occurred, and he informed Retd Major General Jamal Dar that the following relief supplies had been distributed: 1,239 blankets, thousands of pieces of warm clothing, 32,000 pounds of medicines, 371,880 pounds of atta, 11,725 pounds of sugar, 1,420 pounds of tea, 3,928 pounds of milk powder, 18,000 pounds of dal chana, 20,751 pounds of salt, 8,000 pounds of gram, and 18,200 pounds of ghee.

From June 1977 to July 1977, Burki attended a Disaster Relief Seminar (S-Term Observation) in the United States as Commissioner Services & General Administration Department North-West Frontier Province Peshawar Division.

On 27 February 1979, his services were placed at the disposal of the Government of Balochistan with immediate effect.

In the early 1980s, Burki was the Home Secretary and Minister of Tribal Affairs of the Government of North-West Frontier Province and in this position, he received his education at the National School of Public Policy.

He succeeded S.K. Mahmud as Interior Secretary of Pakistan on 13 August 1990 and served as the Administrator of the Islamabad Club from 1990 to 1993.

=== Public image ===
Geoffrey Moorhouse in his book, To the Frontier: A Journey to the Khyber Pass, recalled his initial meeting with Jamshed Burki in the 1980s, depicting him as a "brisk, hatchet-faced man, friendly enough but at pains to indicate how very busy he was."

In his autobiography, Jahan Zeb of Swat wrote, "After the merger, I once contacted Jamshed Burki; he was Commissioner here and he was always very nice to me, respectful and friendly. He was interviewing boys for admission to medical college. And my chauffeur wanted his son to get into that college. So I telephoned Jamshed and said I had this small recommendation. "No Sir, no Sir, they will go by merit! And merit only!", I liked that very much — he being devoted to me, yet saying: By merit."

In 1977, Irish touring cyclist Dervla Murphy, in her book Where the Indus is Young, wrote: "Aurangzeb still represents Swat in the National Assembly— as a member of the opposition, naturally—and is on the friendliest terms with Captain Jamshed Burki, the very able and charming D.C. who has been appointed by Mr. Bhutto to replace the Wali. To me this seems a measure both of Aurangzeb’s fair-mindedness and Captain Burki's tact."

Author Emma Duncan, who had spent eight months in Pakistan from 1987 to 1988, described him as: "a professional high-flyer with snob value, being from a good family and Imran Khan's cousin."

== Later life ==
In February 2009, he was invited to give a speech at the Pakistan Ex-Servicemen Association seminar on the Defence of Pakistan.

In September 2024, Burki visited his cousin Imran Khan in jail and they discussed historical battles.

== Publications ==
Burki, Jamshed (1982). "Analysis of opium production in Pakistan". Pakistan Narcotics Control Board.
