= Khaled Ahmed (writer) =

Pakistani writer and journalist (1943–2024)

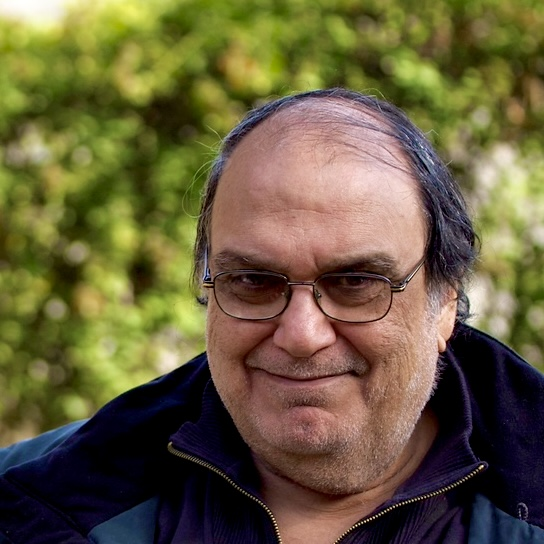
- Khaled Ahmed - Pakistani writer, scholar, intellectual
- Born: 12 February 1943; Jalandhar, Punjab
- Died: 17 October 2024 (aged 81); Lahore, Pakistan
- Occupations: journalist; writer
- Known for: Presidential Pride of Performance Medal (2013)

Khaled Ahmed (12 February 1943 – 17 November 2024) was a Pakistani journalist and writer. He received the Presidential Pride of Performance Medal in 2013. Khaled was a maternal cousin of former Prime Minister Imran Khan.

== Early life and education ==
Ahmed was born in Jalandhar, Punjab, in British India on 12 February 1943. After the Partition of India, he moved to Lahore, settling in Zaman Park. He graduated from the Government College Lahore in 1965, and later the University of the Punjab, while also earning diplomas in German and Russian languages (Moscow University, 1970).

== Career ==
Before starting his career as a diplomat in Pakistan's Foreign Service in 1969, Khaled Ahmed had a brief stint with Sohail Ifthikar's Nigarishat Publishers, where he helped translate Niccolao Manucci's Storia Do Mogor (Mogul India; 1653-1708) to Urdu.

After leaving the Foreign Service, he wrote several books and wrote for The Pakistan Times, The Nation, The Frontier Post, Daily Times, The Friday Times, Newsweek (Pakistan), and most recently Pakistan Standard, where he was the Consulting Editor.

From 1991 to 1993, he was part of the Founding team of the India-Pakistan Neemrana Dialogue, Track Two Diplomacy. Between 2010 and 2013, he served as the Director of South Asia Free Media Association (SAFMA).

== Death ==
Ahmed died from a cardiac arrest in Lahore, on 17 November 2024, at the age of 81.

== Writings ==
Ahmed authored 20 books, mainly on socio-political issues of Pakistan.

- Pakistan: Behind the Ideological Mask, 2011, published by Vanguard Books Lahore
- Sectarian War : Pakistan's Sunni-Shia Violence and Its Links to the Middle East, 2011 published by Oxford University Press, Pakistan, written while at Woodrow Wilson Center, Washington D.C
- Sleepwalking to Surrender: Dealing with Terrorism in Pakistan, 2016 published by Penguin Books, UK
- Pakistan's Terror Conundrum, 2020, Penguin Books

== Awards ==
- Best Book of the Year Award, Academy of Letters Islamabad (2012)
- Presidential Pride of Performance Medal, (2013)
