= Shaukat Khanum Memorial Cancer Hospital and Research Centre =

Shaukat Khanum Memorial Cancer Hospital & Research Centre

Geography
- Location: Lahore and Peshawar (Karachi currently under construction)
- Coordinates: 31.4489°N 74.2715°E (Lahore)

Organisation
- Type: Specialist and teaching
- Patron: Imran Khan

Services
- Beds: 195 (SKMCH&RC, Lahore)

History
- Founded: 1994; 32 years ago

Links
- Website: www.shaukatkhanum.org.pk

Shaukat Khanum Memorial Cancer Hospital and Research Centre (Note: Urdu:شفاخانه و مرکز تحقیقات سرطان یادبود شوکت خانم) (SKMCH&RC) is a cancer centre with locations in Lahore and Peshawar, and an upcoming branch in Karachi, Pakistan. SKMCH&RC Lahore was the first project of the Shaukat Khanum Memorial Trust, the second one being SKMCH&RC Peshawar.

== History ==
Shaukat Khanum Memorial Cancer Hospital and Research Centre was founded by Imran Khan, Pakistani cricketer-turned-politician and former Prime Minister of Pakistan. The inspiration to build a cancer hospital came after his mother, Mrs. Shaukat Khanum, succummed to cancer in 1985. During his mother's illness, he also witnessed the plight of poor cancer patients in Pakistan's hospitals and deeply felt the need for a specialized cancer centre in his country. He had a vision of making cancer treatment accessible to every Pakistani who needed it.

Designing and execution of the master plan was overseen by Khan's cousin, Dr. Nausherwan K. Burki of the University of Kentucky Medical Center, Lexington, Kentucky, in collaboration with an international team of cancer physicians and research workers. Designing and architectural services were provided by Arrasmith, Judd & Rapp, Architects in Health Planning of Louisville, Kentucky, USA. Architectural details were handled by Messrs. Nayyar Ali Dada & Associates of Lahore. Local engineering was performed by Messrs. Progressive Consultants, Lahore. The hospital land was state owned land, and the use was approved by former Prime Minister Nawaz Sharif. Ground was broken in April 1991, and the former Prime Minister Sharif attended the opening ceremony on 29 December 1994.

Since its opening, Shaukat Khanum Memorial Cancer Hospital, Lahore, has received local and international recognition, including the Joint Commission International's Gold Seal of Approval and the World Health Organization's UAE Foundation Prize.

In 1992, Bollywood actor Amitabh Bachchan, Mick Jagger of The Rolling Stones, Peter Gabriel, Vinod Khanna, Elizabeth Hurley, and Nusrat Fateh Ali Khan came together for the Shaukat Khanum Appeal Concert. In the 1990s, Diana, Princess of Wales, visited the hospital alongside her friend Jemima Khan and her two sons.

Celebrity support for Shaukat Khanum has continued through the years. Notable Pakistani actor Fawad Khan dedicated his debut Bollywood film Khoobsurat to the foundation.

=== SKMCH&RC Peshawar ===
Since a quarter of the patients at SKMCH&RC, Lahore were from the Khyber Pakhtunkhwa (KPK) province of Pakistan, and adjoining areas, the second hospital has been built in Peshawar, the capital city of Khyber Pakhtunkhwa.

The second hospital was inaugurated on 29 December 2015 by a cancer patient in Peshawar. At the completion of Phase I, it has commenced clinical services, with outpatient clinics, inpatient beds, a fully equipped intensive care unit (ICU), a full-service pharmacy, and 24-hour emergency services. Chemotherapy services are also available, of tremendous benefit to patients who previously made physically, emotionally, and financially demanding trips to Lahore for cyclical chemotherapy treatments every few weeks.

In conjunction with the commencement of clinical services, the full range of pathology and radiology services have begun in Peshawar. The Radiology department has commenced services. Surgical oncology services are expected to start in 2020 as part of Phase 3 of the development.

== Board of governors ==
The hospital is a project of the Shaukat Khanum Memorial Trust, a non-profit legal entity established under the laws of Pakistan. The Board of Governors formulates overall policy and consists of bankers, researchers, businessmen, and physicians. The hospital is managed by a professional team from clinical, administrative, and nursing backgrounds. Former Prime Minister of Pakistan Imran Khan is the chairman of the board.

The Board of Governors of SKMT is composed of eminent individuals from diverse backgrounds, including bankers, researchers, businessmen, and physicians, who bring valuable experience to the table. The role of the Board includes governance and oversight of the clinical programmes, finances, and resource generation. Mr. Imran Khan (Chairman), Dr. Nausherwan Khan Burki, Mrs. Aleema Khanum, Dr. Uzma Ahad, Mr. Ashiq Hussain Qureshi, Dr. Tauseef Ahmed, Mr. Saifuddin Zoomkawala, Mr. S.M. Muneer, Mr. Munir Kamal, Mr. Irfan Mustafa, Mr. Tariq Shafi, Mr. Ehsan Mani, and Mr. Atif Bukhari.

== Clinical departments ==
- Surgical Oncology
- Anesthesiology Details
- Medical Oncology
- Pediatric Oncology
- Pharmacy Details
- Clinical & Radiation Oncology
- Nuclear Medicine Details
- Pathology Details
- Ancillary Health Services
- Clinical Radiology
- Internal Medicine

== Research ==
Research is needed to develop better ways of detecting and treating cancer and to improve cancer care. Over the coming years, SKMCH&RC's expanding knowledge of cancer genetics will have a major impact on its ability to predict an individual's level of risk of developing cancer, to detect and diagnose cancer early, and to select treatments that are most likely to be effective. Ultimately, the genetic revolution may lead to ways of preventing cancer. The genetic revolution provides major opportunities for identifying people at risk of cancer and for developing better treatments. At the moment, such studies are limited in Pakistan.

SKMCH&RC's research is organized in three streams:

- Epidemiology, which seeks to understand the lifestyle and environmental causes of cancer
- Molecular biology, which will enable the development of better ways of predicting treatment responses and disease outcome i.e. molecular markers
- Clinical trials, which are primarily focused on the evaluation of existing and new therapies.

The Management Information Systems (MIS) Department has developed a hospital information system through which, the research team has been able to handle the logistics of a large hospital, documenting a large amount arge amount of patient information.

SKMCH&RC's objective is to explore the bridge between laboratory and clinic through the support of translational studies in areas of diagnosis, prognosis, and treatment. It is important to maintain research concerned with cancer in the local population, addressing issues of prevention through studies on the effects of genetic make-up, environment, and lifestyle.

The research section has been developed over the last five years and, recently, received a donation to refurbish the third floor of the hospital into a research wing, housing a suite of research laboratories, a data management and epidemiology division, as well as a clinical research section responsible for clinical trials.

The team of researchers is expanding and several projects are underway. Currently, Basic Sciences Research is divided into three main areas of interest and several projects are being conducted:

Identification of genetic risk factors in the development of cancer

- Prevalence and spectrum of BRCA1/2 germline mutations in Pakistani Breast and/or Ovarian Cancer families.
- A study to evaluate the association between germline genetic variation and disease risk and outcome in ovarian carcinoma in Pakistan.
- The role of p53 mutations in the development, progression and outcome of breast cancer in Pakistan.
- Genetic causes of colorectal cancer in the Pakistani population.

Tumor virology

- Human Papillomavirus Associated with Esophageal Cancer in Pakistan - A Retrospective Analysis.
- Human Papillomavirus in Cervical Cancer cases from Pakistan.
- Transcriptional profiling of Hodgkin's Lymphoma; relationship to Epstein-Barr virus status, histological subtype and geographical locale.

Infections and cancer

Quantitative PCR for detection and quantification of fungal infections in patients with acute myeloid leukemia (AML), acute lymphoblastic leukemia (ALL) and myelodysplastic syndrome.

== Future ==
A third branch of SKMCH&RC is under construction in DHA City, Karachi. It is scheduled to open in 2026 and will be the largest branch of SKMCH&RC.

== Achievements ==
Shaukat Khanum Memorial Cancer Hospital & Research Center, Peshawar branch, has now earned Joint Commission International's Gold Seal of Approval® for Hospital Accreditation after strictly following compliance with its standards which are recognized globally.

On 1 September 2023 the hospital received a certification by the American Society of Clinical Oncology's Quality Oncology Practice Initiative (QOPI) Certification Program, allowing Pakistan to become the first country in South Asia and sixth in the world to receive this certification.

=== Regional offices ===
Shaukat Khanum Memorial Cancer Hospital and Research Center has regional offices throughout Pakistan, in Lahore, Karachi, Islamabad, Peshawar, Multan, Faisalabad and Sialkot. Moreover, the hospital has expanded its marketing and fundraising reach to cities like Gujranwala, Sheikhupura, Rahim Yar Khan and Sahiwal.

It has overseas offices in England, the United States, Canada, Australia, the United Arab Emirates and Norway.

== Criticism and mishaps ==
There have been some allegations by a writer of "The News" of misuse of funds by Shaukat Khanum Memorial Cancer Hospital. SKMCH has denied these allegations.

=== Fundraiser cancellation ===
In an unprecedented move, a planned fundraiser event for Shaukat Khanum Karachi had to be cancelled on 29 December 2023 as Islamabad's Additional District Magistrate, Abdullah Mehmood, withdrew the NOC granted for the event and threatened the cancer hospital with legal consequences if the event were to take place. No reason was given for the withdrawal. The move was widely condemned, with the President of Pakistan, Arif Alvi terming it as “cutting off one’s nose to spite the face" in an allusion to the ongoing crackdown against Imran Khan's political party.

== See also ==
- List of hospitals in Pakistan
- Imran Khan
- Cancer
