= Baqa Jilani =

Indian cricketer

Personal information
- Full name: Mohammad Baqa Khan Jilani
- Born: 20 July 1911; Jalandhar, Punjab, British India
- Died: 2 July 1941 (aged 29); Jalandhar, Punjab, British India
- Batting: Right-handed
- Bowling: Right-arm medium

International information
- National side: India
- Only Test (cap 26): 15 August 1936 v England

Career statistics
| Competition | Test | First-class |
|---|---|---|
| Matches | 1 | 31 |
| Runs scored | 16 | 928 |
| Batting average | 8.00 | 18.56 |
| 100s/50s | 0/0 | 1/5 |
| Top score | 12 | 113 |
| Balls bowled | 90 | 3,603 |
| Wickets | 0 | 83 |
| Bowling average | – | 19.93 |
| 5 wickets in innings | – | 3 |
| 10 wickets in match | – | 1 |
| Best bowling | – | 7/37 |
| Catches/stumpings | 0/– | 12/– |
- Source: CricketArchive, 3 September 2022

Mohammad Baqa Khan Jilani (20 July 1911 – 2 July 1941) was an Indian bowler who represented India in Test cricket.

== Early life and family ==
Jilani was born in Jalandhar, Punjab on 20 July 1911. He was related by marriage to the family that also produced Majid Khan, Javed Burki and Imran Khan, who is the former Prime Minister of Pakistan.

== Career ==
As a right-arm medium-paced bowler and a decent lower-order batsman, he kicked off his career with twelve wickets on first-class debut. He also took the first hat-trick in Ranji Trophy, for Northern India against Southern Punjab in the semifinal of the first tournament in 1934–35. Southern Punjab was dismissed for 22 which was the lowest total in the competition for 76 years.

Jilani played his only Test match in England in 1936 during a tour wrecked by infighting between two factions supportive of the captain Vizzy and the former captain C. K. Nayudu. Jilani belonged to the former group. A few days before the Test Match at the Oval, Jilani publicly insulted Nayudu while coming down to breakfast. It has been alleged that he owed to this incident his subsequent Test debut, a forgettable affair to which he contributed sixteen runs and fifteen wicketless overs. During the tour, according to Cota Ramaswami, Jilani had high blood pressure, insomnia, sleep-walking and violent outbursts of temper. "Nobody could say when he was normal and when he got into uncontrollable temper. He was constantly undergoing treatment during the tour".

In 1941, while working as an Extra Assistant Commissioner in Jalandhar, Jilani died, aged 29, after falling from the balcony of his home during an epileptic seizure.

== See also ==
- One Test Wonder

== Notes ==
- Mihir Bose, A History of Indian Cricket
- Richard Cashman, Patrons, Players and the Crowd
- Baqa Jilani at Cricinfo
