= Jahangir Khan (cricketer) =

Indian cricketer (1910 – 1988)

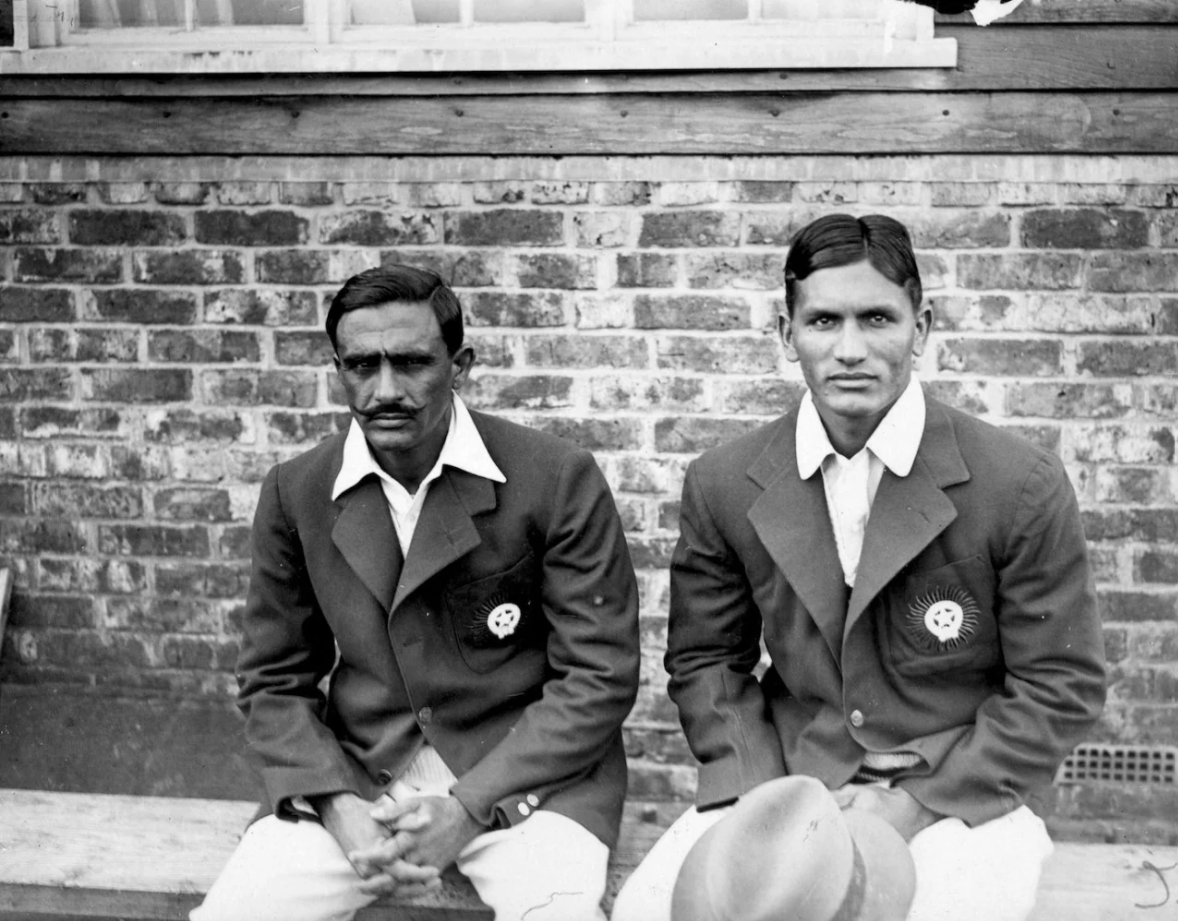
- Ghulam Mohammad (left) and Jahangir Khan (right) in England as part of the Indian cricket team in England in 1932

Personal information
- Full name: Dr. Mohammad Jahangir Khan
- Born: 1 February 1910; Basti Ghuzan, Jalandhar, Punjab, British India
- Died: 23 July 1988 (aged 78); Lahore, Punjab, Pakistan
- Height: 6 ft (183 cm)
- Batting: Right-handed
- Bowling: Right-arm fast medium
- Relatives: Majid Khan (son); Asad Jahangir Khan (son); Bazid Khan (grandson)

International information
- National side: India (1932–1936)
- Test debut (cap 3): 25 June 1932 v England
- Last Test: 15 August 1936 v England

Career statistics
Competition	Test	First-class
Matches	4	111
Runs scored	39	3,327
Batting average	5.57	22.32
100s/50s	0/0	4/7
Top score	13	133
Balls bowled	606	8,314
Wickets	4	328
Bowling average	63.75	25.34
5 wickets in innings	0	12
10 wickets in match	0	2
Best bowling	4/60	8/33
Catches/stumpings	4/–	82/–
- Source: ESPNcricinfo, 9 May 2020

Dr Mohammad Jahangir Khan (1 February 1910 – 23 July 1988) was an international cricketer who played for India. After the Partition of India, he served as a cricket administrator in Pakistan.

== Personal life ==
Dr Mohammad Jahangir Khan hailed from a Pashtun family that is famous in cricket for producing three Pakistan captains: Javed Burki, Majid Khan and Imran Khan. He was father of Majid Khan. Majid's son Bazid Khan also represented Pakistan for the first time in 2005, making the family the second, after the Headleys to have three consecutive generations of Test cricketers. Baqa Jilani, the brother-in-law of Jahangir Khan, also represented India in Test cricket.

He graduated from Islamia College, Lahore.

At the time of his death, he was the last survivor from the team that played for India in his first Test.

He was buried in his hometown.

== Sports career ==
=== Athletics ===
In his younger days, he was also a champion javelin thrower of India. He represented India in AAA Championships in 1932 and British Empire Games 1934 in London.

=== Cricket ===
Jahangir scored 108 on his first-class debut and took seven wickets in the second innings of the match. He represented India in her first ever Test against England at Lord's in 1932. After the tour, he stayed back in England and took a doctorate from Cambridge University. He passed the final Bar from Middle Temple. In that time he was Cambridge blue in cricket for four years. He also made two appearances in Gentlemen v Players matches. In 1935 playing for Indian Gymkhana, he also scored 1,380 runs in two months, at an average of 70.

When India toured England in 1936 he joined the team and appeared in all three Tests. His best bowling during his time at Cambridge was a 7 for 58 against the champion county Yorkshire. Back in British India, he played in the Bombay Pentangular in 1939. Jahangir was to captain India in a tour of Ceylon in 1940–41 that was cancelled due to the war.

==== Lord's Sparrow incident ====
Khan played cricket for Cambridge University and during a match at Lord's Cricket Ground on 26 July 1936 against the M.C.C. he bowled a delivery to Tom Pearce that struck and killed a sparrow while in mid-flight. The sparrow was mounted on a plinth with the ball that killed it and is now on display at the M.C.C. museum. Neil Robinson, head of heritage and collections at the M.C.C. said "People expect to see balls, bats and gloves at the museum, not a sparrow" and "Those who don't know the story are always surprised."

== Administration career ==
=== Selector ===
Jahangir was a selector between 1939–40 and 1941–42. After moving to Pakistan after 1947, he served as a selector in Pakistan and managed the team that toured India in 1960–1961. He was a college principal and then served as the Director of Education in Pakistan before retiring. When Jalandhar hosted its first Test match in 1983, Jahangir was specially invited to attend the match.
