= Majid Khan (cricketer) =

Pakistani cricketer

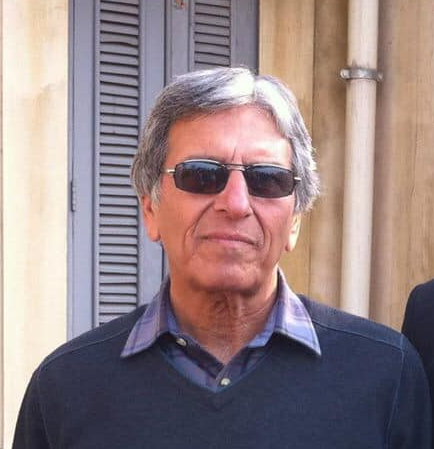

Personal information
- Full name: Majid Jahangir Khan
- Born: 28 September 1946 (age 80); Ludhiana, Punjab, British India
- Batting: Right-handed
- Bowling: Right-arm medium; Right-arm off break
- Relatives: Jahangir Khan (father); Asad Jahangir Khan (brother); Javed Burki (cousin) Imran Khan (cousin); Bazid Khan (son); Ijaz Khan (cousin); Ahmed Raza (uncle); Baqa Jilani (uncle)

International information
- National side: Pakistan (1964–1983)
- Test debut (cap 44): 24 October 1964 v Australia
- Last Test: 23 January 1983 v India
- ODI debut (cap 4): 11 February 1973 v New Zealand
- Last ODI: 19 July 1982 v England

Career statistics
Competition	Test	ODI	FC	LA
Matches	63	23	410	168
Runs scored	3,931	786	27,444	4,441
Batting average	38.92	37.42	43.01	28.28
100s/50s	8/19	1/7	73/128	2/31
Top score	167	109	241	115
Balls bowled	3,584	658	18,314	2,817
Wickets	27	13	223	71
Bowling average	53.92	28.76	32.14	22.67
5 wickets in innings	0	0	4	1
10 wickets in match	0	0	0	0
Best bowling	4/45	3/27	6/67	5/24
Catches/stumpings	70/–	3/–	410/–	43/–
- Source: ESPNcricinfo, 4 February 2006

Majid Jahangir Khan (Pashto, Urdu: ماجد جہانگیر خان; born 28 September 1946), nicknamed "Majestic Khan" by the British press, is a former cricketer, batsman and captain of the Pakistan national cricket team. In his prime, he was considered to be one of the best batsmen in the world. Khan has been claimed as the best ever opening batsman against express pace, averaging over 50 each in test matches and World Cups when opening against the fearsome pace attacks of the 1970s West Indies and Australia, with all but 2 of these matches played away from home. In his first class cricket career spanning 18 years, from 1961 to 1985, Majid Khan played in 63 Test matches for Pakistan, scoring 3,931 runs with 8 centuries, scored over 27,000 first-class runs and made 73 first-class centuries, with 128 fifties. Majid played his last Test for Pakistan in January 1983 against India at Gaddafi Stadium, Lahore and his last One Day International (ODI) was in July 1982 against England at Old Trafford, Manchester.

== Early life ==
Majid Jahangir Khan was born on 28 September 1946 in Ludhiana, in the Punjab Province of British India (now in Punjab, India). Khan grew up in Lahore, the capital of the Punjab province of Pakistan. His father, Jahangir Khan, had played Test cricket for India before the Partition of India in 1947. He is a cousin of former Pakistani Prime Minister Imran Khan, who was also a former captain of the Pakistan national cricket team before entering politics. Majid Khan started his career as a pace bowler, but a back injury and doubts over his technique converted him into an off-spin bowler and batsman.

Khan also played for Glamorgan in Britain, Queensland in Australia, and in Pakistan for Pakistan International Airlines, Rawalpindi, Lahore and the province of Punjab. Whilst playing for Glamorgan in 1969, he was approached to join University of Cambridge and play cricket for them by two Sri Lankan players. Khan was enrolled to Emmanuel College by a tutor, David Newsome, and read History between 1969 and 1972. He captained the Cambridge University cricket team in 1971 and 1972 and had the distinction of being the winning captain against an international touring side, his own national team, Pakistan, in 1971; such a feat was only last achieved by a Cambridge University cricket team in 1927, against the touring New Zealand team. Khan also scored a double century against Oxford University in the 'University Match' in 1970 at the Lord's cricket ground.

His father, Dr. Jahangir Khan, famously killed a bird in flight while bowling during an MCC vs. Cambridge University match in 1936. This bird is now part of the permanent MCC museum exhibit at Lord's Cricket ground. Dr. Jahangir Khan was the Chief Selector of then Board of Control for Cricket in Pakistan (BCCP) when Majid Khan was close to national selection. Dr. Jahangir Khan resigned from his post to maintain the impartiality of the Cricket Board during selection.

== International career ==
In 1964, Majid's Test career started against Australia at National Stadium, Karachi. Majid Khan is one of only six batsmen (the other five are Trumper, Macartney, Bradman, Warner and Shikhar Dhawan), to have scored a century before lunch on the first day of a test match, scoring 108 not-out off 78 balls against New Zealand in Karachi during the 1976–77 test series. Khan made his ODI debut against New Zealand in 1973 at Lancaster Park, New Zealand. He also holds the unique honour of scoring the first one-day century for Pakistan, in an ODI against England at Trent Bridge on 31 August 1974. Khan scored 109 from 93 balls with 16 fours and a six, leading Pakistan to victory.

Majid had played for Lahore since 1961–62 and had made his Test debut against Australia in 1964–65 and toured England and Wales with the 1967 Pakistanis. During a match with Glamorgan, Majid blasted a rapid 147 in 89 minutes, hitting Roger Davis for five sixes in one over. Wilf Wooller, the club secretary, had been a close friend of Majid's father when Dr Jahangir Khan had been up at Cambridge, and the influential Glamorgan secretary persuaded Glamorgan county to sign him as the overseas player from 1968. In 1972 he won the Walter Lawrence Trophy for the season's fastest century which he scored in 70 minutes for Glamorgan against Warwickshire. He captained the Welsh county between 1973 and 1976, scored over 9000 runs punctuated with 21 first-class centuries for them. Imran Khan, the legendary Pakistani ex-captain and fast bowler, and Javed Burki are his cousins. Bazid Khan, Majid's son, has also played for Pakistan, making the family the second, after the Headleys, to have three consecutive generations of Test cricketers.

Initially, Majid Khan continued to boost Pakistan's middle order until he was promoted to fill the opener's slot with Sadiq Mohammad in 1974. He was the first century scorer for Pakistan in One Day International Cricket, scoring 109 runs against England at Trent Bridge, Nottingham in the same season. Majid Khan was also a specialist slip fielder and made most catches look easy. Khan was also well known as a "walker", maintaining the standards of the game in an era when professionalism was straining at the game's traditional etiquette.

The 1976–77 tour of West Indies was the most remarkable period for Majid Khan, where he scored 530 Test runs against one of the most powerful bowling attacks in the history of the game. His best innings was perhaps the 167 in Pakistan's second innings at Georgetown that saved Pakistan from likely defeat. Pakistan lost that series 2–1.

== Playing style ==
In a 2020 feature on Pakistan's five most stylish batsmen, Shamya Dasgupta describes Majid Khan as an elegant right-hander, "left-hand stylish" in effect, renowned for flowing drives and pulls and a relaxed, sophisticated bearing at the crease; though some critics mistook this for indifference, his long and successful first-class and Test career belied that view.

== Post-retirement ==
=== Administration career ===
After retirement from International Cricket, Khan became an administrator with the Pakistan Cricket Board, becoming the CEO of the board in the mid-1990s. He was the Chief Selector for Pakistan in 1993. He officiated the Australia and West Indies Test series in 1995 as a match-referee. He was the Chief Executive of the Pakistan Board but resigned after levelling match-fixing allegations against the Pakistan team in the 1999 World Cup. His claims were backed by Sarfraz Nawaz at the time but led to no prosecutions. He now lives in Islamabad.

== Bibliography ==
- Zahid Zia Cheema, Mighty Khan: A Tribute to Majid Khan (1996, 2008)

Preceded by Asif Iqbal	Pakistan Cricket Captain; 1975	Succeeded by Asif Iqbal
