= Javed Burki =

Pakistani cricketer (born 1938)

Personal information
- Born: 8 May 1938 (age 88); Meerut, United Provinces, British India
- Batting: Right-handed
- Bowling: Right-arm medium
- Relatives: Majid Khan (cousin); Imran Khan (cousin); Shahid Javed Burki (cousin); Ahmed Raza (uncle); Zahid Ali Akbar Khan (cousin)

International information
- National side: Pakistan
- Test debut (cap 36): 2 December 1960 v India
- Last Test: 8 November 1969 v New Zealand

Career statistics
Competition	Test	First-class
Matches	25	177
Runs scored	1,341	9,421
Batting average	30.47	36.37
100s/50s	3/4	22/31
Top score	140	227
Balls bowled	42	3,394
Wickets	0	35
Bowling average	–	44.57
5 wickets in innings	–	0
10 wickets in match	–	0
Best bowling	–	4/13
Catches/stumpings	7/–	101/–
- Source: Cricinfo, 12 June 2017

Javed Burki (Urdu: جاوید برکی; born 8 May 1938) is a Pakistani former cricketer, government official, and businessman.

== Early life and family ==
Burki received his early education from Saint Mary's Academy at Rawalpindi. He also played cricket while studying at Oxford University (1958–1960).

Javed Burki is the son of General Wajid Ali Khan Burki (1900–1988). General Burki's sister-in-law, Shaukat Khanum (Burki), was the mother of Imran Khan, cricketer and a former Prime Minister of Pakistan. Another of Burki's cousins, Majid Khan, also was Pakistan's cricket captain.

Burki's brothers include Nausherwan Burki, a founding member of the Shaukat Khanum Memorial Cancer Hospital & Research Centre, and Jamshed Burki, a career civil servant who was the Interior Secretary.

== Career ==
=== Cricket ===
Burki played in 25 Test matches from 1960 to 1969, captaining Pakistan on its tour of England in 1962. He later was an ICC match referee.

=== Government ===
After retiring from cricket, Burki joined the Pakistan Civil Service as part of the District Management Malakand Division – NWFP eventually working his way up to become Secretary to Government of Pakistan's Ministry of Commerce and Secretary Ministry of Water and Power (WAPDA).

=== Business ===
Burki was CEO of Pakistan Automobile Corporation (PACO) under whose leadership Pakistan's first locally assembled car company, the Pak Suzuki Motor Company, was launched.

== Arrest ==
During the dictatorship of General Pervez Musharraf Burki objected to the questionable military vehicle procurement process by senior serving members of Pakistan's Army. To silence him, Burki and his partner Muzzamil Niazi were both arrested on 19 December 2002, in Islamabad and Lahore respectively, and taken to Karachi Central Jail.

== Notes ==
Sporting positions
Preceded by Imtiaz Ahmed	Pakistan cricket captain 1962	Succeeded by Hanif Mohammad
