= List of Pakistani political families =

Prominent political families in Pakistan

This is a partial listing of prominent political families of Pakistan given in alphabetical order.

== Abbasi (surname) ==
- Sadeq Mohammad Khan V, Nawab of Bahawalpur
- Bahawal Khan V, Nawab of Bahawalpur
- Sadeq Mohammad Khan IV, Nawab of Bahawalpur
- Abbas Abbasi, Late Amir of Bahawalpur
- Sahibzada Usman Abbasi, Former MPA Deputy Speaker Provincial assembly of Punjab
- Sahibzada Gazain Abbasi, MPA Member Provincial Assembly of Punjab
- Sadaqat Ali Abbasi, Former MNA Member National Assembly of Punjab
- Shahid Khaqan Abbasi, Former Prime Minister of Pakistan

== Arain ==
- Mian Muhammad Azhar (Governor of Punjab, 1990-1993, Mayor of Lahore 1987-1991
- Hammad Azhar (Previous Finance Minister of Pakistan)

Mian Family of Baghbanpura

- Justice Mian Shah Din, (1868–1918), Elected President of the All-India Muslim League(March 1908), Member of the Simla Deputation in 1906, First Muslim Judge in British India, Poet and Writer.
- Sir Mian Mohammad Shafi, KCSI, CIE (1869–1932), one of the founding fathers & President All India Muslim league (Punjab)
- Justice Sir Mian Abdul Rashid (29 June 1889 – 6 November 1981), Kt, KCSI, was the first Chief Justice of Pakistan 1947, legal philosopher, one of the founding fathers of Pakistan
- Mian Sir Muhammad Shah Nawaz, Politician of Punjab in the 1920s
- Mian Iftikharuddin, Politician, owner of Pakistan Times and Daily Imroz, 1947–1962
- Begum Jahanara Shahnawaz (1896–1979) politician in Pakistan, first woman to preside over an Asian legislature. Founder All India Women Muslim League in 1935
- Mumtaz Shahnawaz (1912-1948) - young woman political activist and author, who died in a tragic plane crash at the age of 35

== Bhatti ==
- Shahbaz Bhatti, former Federal Minister for Minorities Affairs
- Zulfiqar Ali Bhatti (politician), MNA Member of the National Assembly of Pakistan
- Ahmer Rasheed Bhatti, MPA Member of the Provincial Assembly of the Punjab
- Aneeqa Mehdi, MNA Member of the National Assembly of Pakistan
- Shahid Hussain Bhatti, former MNA Member of the National Assembly of Pakistan
- Mian Ijaz Hussain Bhatti, former MPA Member of the Provincial Assembly of the Punjab
- Raja Shoukat Aziz Bhatti, MPA Member of the Provincial Assembly of the Punjab
- Sajid Ahmad Khan, former MPA Member of the Provincial Assembly of the Punjab
- Mehdi Hassan Bhatti, former MNA Member of the National Assembly of Pakistan
- Muhammad Khan Bhatti, Pakistani Politician
- Muhammad Aoun Jahangir, MPA Member of the Provincial Assembly of the Punjab
- Shaukat Ali Bhatti, former MPA Member of the Provincial Assembly of the Punjab
- Muhammad Ahsan Jahangir, former MPA Member of the Provincial Assembly of the Punjab
- Nighat Intisar Bhatti, former MPA Member of the Provincial Assembly of the Punjab
- Rai Taimoor Khan, former MPA Member of the Provincial Assembly of the Punjab

== Bhuttos ==
- Shah Nawaz Bhutto - The Dewan of Junagadh and the Father of Zulfiqar Ali Bhutto (Member Bombay Council).
  - Zulfikar Ali Bhutto, 4th President (1970–1973) and the 9th Prime Minister (1973–1977) of Pakistan.
  - Mumtaz Bhutto, cousin of Zulfikar, (chief of Bhutto tribe, former chief minister and Governor of Sindh, Federal Minister of Pakistan)
    - Nusrat Bhutto, wife of Zulfikar (former minister without portfolio)
    - Benazir Bhutto, daughter of Zulfikar (Prime Minister, 1988–1990 and 1993–1996), assassinated December 27, 2007.
    - Murtaza Bhutto, elder son of Zulfikar Ali Bhutto and the brother of former Prime Minister of Pakistan Benazir Bhutto. He was assassinated.
    - Shahnawaz Bhutto, son of Zulfikar Ali Bhutto. He died under mysterious circumstances.
    - Ameer Bux Bhutto, son of Mumtaz Bhutto, Vice President of Sindh National Front and ex-Member of Sindh Assembly.
      - Fatima Bhutto, daughter of Murtaza Bhutto.
      - Bilawal Bhutto Zardari, son of Benazir Bhutto and Asif Ali Zardari, party chairman

== Baloch ==
=== Babar ===
- Nawabzada Nasrullah Khan, Pakistani politician (1916–2003)
- Naseerullah Babar, Pakistani politician and former Army General
- Farhatullah Babar, Pakistani politician

=== Chandio ===
- Maula Bakhsh Chandio, Former Federal Minister for Law and Justice
- Rasool Bakhsh Chandio, MNA Member of the National Assembly of Pakistan
- Imdad Chandio, Former MPA Provincial Minister for Food and Finance

=== Dreshak ===
- Sardar Nasrullah Khan Dreshak, Former MPA Member of the Provincial Assembly of the Punjab
- Hafeez-ur-Rehman Dreshak, MNA Member of the National Assembly of Pakistan

=== Gabol ===
- Allah Bakhsh Gabol, Member Bombay Legislative Assembly 1928, Member Sindh Legislative Assembly 1937 and Mayor of Karachi for two terms.
  - Nabil Gabol (Grandson of Khan Bahadur Allah Bakhsh and son of Ahmed Khan Gabol), Member Sindh Assembly 1988, 1993, 1997; Member National Assembly 2002, 2008 and Federal Minister for Ports and Shipping.

=== Leghari ===
- Farooq Leghari (ex President of Pakistan)
- Jamal Leghari
- Awais Leghari
- Muhammad Mohsin Khan Leghari
- Rafique Haider Khan Leghari
- Arshad Khan Leghari

=== Mazari ===
- Sardar Mir Balakh Sher Mazari ( Tumandar Mazari Tribe(1930–Present), Former Care taker Prime minister of Pakistan)
- Shaukat Hussein Mazari (Former MPA, Punjab Assembly, former Deputy-Speaker, former provincial ministerPunjab Assembly)
- Sardar Atif Hussein Mazari (Former MPA, Punjab Assembly)
- Sardar Saleem Jan Mazari (Former MNA, former Provincial Minister from Sindh and former district Nazim Kashmore)
- Sardar Ehsan ur Rehman Mazari ( MNA Kashmore)
- Sardar Mir Dost Muhammad Mazari (Former MNA & Minister for water power, MPA & Deputy speaker Punjab assembly)

=== Zardari ===
- Hakim Ali Zardari, the patriarch of Zardari family.
- Ali Hassan Zardari, MPA Member Provincial Assembly of Sindh
- Asif Ali Zardari, son of Hakim Ali Zardari and husband of Benazir Bhutto, President of Pakistan
- Bilawal Bhutto Zardari, son of Asif Ali Zardari and Benazir Bhutto, Chairman Pakistan Peoples Party(see also Bhutto family above)
- Azra Peechoho, daughter of Hakim Ali Zardari
- Faryal Talpur, daughter of Hakim Ali Zardari, Former Nazima Nawabshah District, MNA

== Gujjar ==
=== Chaudhary Gujjars ===
- Akhtar Ali Vario, Former MNA/MPA/Minister C&W /Minister for Excise /Chairman Standing Committee Narcotics/Chairman District Council Sialkot
- Choudhary Khush Akhtar Subhani, Provincial Minister population welfare/Prisons/Housing & Physical Planning/Environmental Planning
- Tariq Subhani, MPA
- Armaghan Subhani, MNA/ Ex MPA/provincial minister
- Adil Pervaiz Gujjar, MPA-PTI, son of Pervaiz Sultan MPA Sammundari, Faisalabad
- Fazal Ilahi Chaudhry, Former President of Pakistan
- Chaudhry Muhammad Jaffar Iqbal, Senior Vice-President of PML-N.
- Qamar Zaman Kaira, Former Governor of Gilgit-Baltistan and Minister of Information.
- Tanveer Ashraf Kaira, Former Minister of Finance and General Secretary of PPP Punjab.
- Shafqat Mehmood, Federal Minister of Education/ E -Information and Petroleum.
- Chaudhry Zaka Ashraf, Former Chairman Pakistan Cricket Board and the owner of ZTBL.
- Malik Abrar Ahmad, MNA chairman PHA.
- Sardar Muhammad Yousuf, Religious minister.
- Fayyaz Ul Hassan Chohan, Former Information Minister, Punjab
- Chaudhry Amir Hussain, Former Speaker National Assembly
- Nawabzada Ghazanfar Ali Gul, Former MNA/Minister
- Chaudhry Muhammad Akhlaq, Minister of Special Education, Punjab
- Maiza Hameed, (Maiza Hameed Gujjar) member of National assembly of Pakistan and provincial assembly of Pakistan belonged to PMLN political party
- Chaudhry Jaffar Iqbal Gujjar,
  - Zeb Jaffar, politicians, member of National assembly of Pakistan and daughter of "Jaffar Iqbal Gujjar"
  - Muhammad Omar Jaffar, member of the provincial assembly of Punjab and son of "Jaffar Iqbal Gujjar" MPA from (PMLN) party
- Chaudhry Nadeem Khadim was a member of the provincial assembly of Punjab in from PMLN
- Muhammad Iqbal Gujjar, been a Member of the Provincial Assembly of the Punjab from (2018- 2023) PMLN party from PP-63 Gujranwala-XIII
- Fanoos Gujjar, politicians and founder of Awami Workers Party of Khyber Pakhtunkhwa he remained a member of the provincial assembly of (KPK)
- Sardar Muhammad Yousuf, member of PMLN from KPK (Hazara) he held the position of Religious Affairs and Interfaith Harmony, in the Abbasi cabinet from (2017-2018)

== Jutt ==
Chattha Jatt

- Hamid Nasir Chattha, Former Speaker of the National Assembly.
- Muhammad Ahmed Chattha, MNA Member National Assembly of Pakistan
- Adnan Afzal Chattha, MPA Member Provincial Assembly of Punjab

Chaudhary family

- Ch Muhammad Saqlain (He was elected for the third term as Member, Provincial Assembly of Punjab in general elections 2008 independently. Former MPA is now PTI's candidate for the constituency NA-66 Jhelum-I).
- Chaudhry Zahoor Elahi (A parliamentarian who played a major role in the restoration of democracy and human rights in Pakistan)
- Chaudhry Shujat Hussain (Prime Minister of Pakistan - 2004)
- Chaudhry Pervaiz Elahi (Chief Minister of Punjab - October - 2002 to October 2007)
- Chaudhry Wajahat Hussain, Former Federal Minister of Human Resources
- Chaudhary Moonis Elahi, MNA, Federal Minister for Water Resources
- Chaudhary Salik Hussain, MNA, Federal Minister of Board of Investment & Special Initiatives
- Chaudhary Hussain Elahi, MNA
- Chaudhry Fawad Hussain, Former Federal Minister of Information & Broadcasting

Cheema

- Anwar Ali Cheema MNA
- Iftikhar Ahmad Cheema
- Saif Ullah Cheema
- Muhamad Afzal Cheema Acting President of Pakistan
- Chaudhry Aamir Sultan Cheema son of Anwar Ali Cheema
- Omer Sarfraz Cheema Former Governor of Punjab
- Muhammad Ajmal Cheema, Former Provincial Minister of Punjab for Bait-ul-Mal and Social Welfare
- Tariq Bashir Cheema
- Muhammad Muneeb Sultan Cheema MPA, Former Provincial Minister of Transport, son of Chaudhry Aamir Sultan Cheema
- Nisar Ahmed Cheema
- Tanzila Aamir Cheema Wife of Chaudhry Aamir Sultan Cheema and mother of Muhammad Muneeb Sultan Cheema
- Chaudhry Faisal Farooq Cheema

Tarar

- Mamoon Jaffar Tarar, Former MPA Member Provincial Assembly of Punjab
- Attaullah Tarar, MNA Federal Minister for Information
- Bilal Farooq Tarar, Former MPA Member Provincial assembly of Punjab
- Saira Afzal Tarar, MNA Member National Assembly of Pakistan
- Azam Nazeer Tarar, Federal Minister for Law and Justice
- Muhammad Rafiq Tarar, Former President of Pakistan

== Kharal ==
- Rai Ahmad Khan Kharal, Ruler (nawab) of Jhamra, chieftain of the Kharal tribe.
- Ghulam Mustafa Khar, Former Governor of Punjab and former Chief Minister of Punjab.
- Ghulam Noor Rabbani Khar, Former Member of National Assembly of Pakistan.
- Hina Rabbani Khar, Minister of State for Foreign Affairs, Member of National Assembly of Pakistan.
- Malik Ghulam Raza Rabbani Khar, Former Member of National Assembly of Pakistan.
- Malik Ghulam Arbi Khar, Former Member of National Assembly of Pakistan
- Masood Shafqat, Former Member of the Provincial Assembly of the Punjab
- Khalid Ahmed Kharal, Former Federal Minister of Information of Pakistan.
- Malik Ghulam Raza Rabbani Khar, Member of National Assembly of Pakistan.
- Rai Ghulam Mujtaba Kharal, Former Member of National Assembly of Pakistan.
- Rai Usman Khan Kharal, Former Member of the Provincial Assembly of the Punjab.
- Rai Haider Ali Khan Kharal, Former Member of the Provincial Assembly of the Punjab.

== Khattar ==
- Nawab Muhammad Hayat Khan CSI, early member of the Punjab legislature in the 19th c
- Sir Sikandar Hayat Khan, KBE, Premier/CM of the Punjab 1937-1942.
- Sir Liaqat Hayat Khan, KCSI, Prime Minister of Patiala state in British India.
- Sardar Shaukat Hayat Khan, senior political figure and close associate of MA Jinnah.
- HE Izzet Hayat Khan, former Pakistani ambassador to Tunisia
- Ghulam Sarwar Khan, Minister of Petroleum and (Member National Assembly of Pakistan)
- Tahir Sadiq Khan,(Member National Assembly of Pakistan) and former district nazim Attock
- Muhammad Zain Elahi, Former (Member National Assembly of Pakistan)

== Khokhars ==
- Ghazanfar Ali Khan - Former Minister of Food, Agriculture and Health, Ambassador to Iran 1948-1952, to Turkey 1952-1953, to India 1954-1956 and to Italy 1956-1957.
- Riaz Khokhar (Former Foreign Secretary of Pakistan serving from June 2002 to February 2005)
- M. Nawaz Khokhar (Former Deputy Speaker of the National Assembly of Pakistan)
- Malik Ahmad Khan Bhachar (Member Provisional Assembly of Punjab)
- Afzal Khokhar (Member National Assembly of Pakistan)
- Malik Saif ul Malook Khokhar (Member National Assembly of Pakistan)
- Malik Muhammad Ali Khokhar (Member Provisional Assembly of Punjab)
- Faisal Ayub Khokhar (Member Provincial Assembly of Punjab)
- Mustafa Nawaz Khokhar (Member Senate of Pakistan)
- Karam Elahi Bandial (Member Provisional Assembly of Punjab)
- Malik Ali Abbas Khokhar (Member Provisional Assembly of Punjab)
- Malik Karamat Khokhar (Member National Assembly of Pakistan)

== Pashtun/Pathan ==
=== Bangash ===
- Ghulam Ishaq Khan, President of Pakistan.

=== Gandapur ===
- Sardar Aurang Zeb Khan, former Chief Minister of KPK (1943-1945), Served as ambassador of Pakistan to Burma
- Asad Ullah Jan Khan, former Member of Provincial Assembly of KPK and Legislative Assembly of Pakistan
- Inayatullah Khan Gandapur, former chief minister of KPK (1973–1975), Served as KPK finance minister between 1972 and 1973.
- Ikramullah Gandapur, former Minister of Agriculture in KPK, important leader in Kulachi area.
- Israrullah Khan Gandapur, member of KPK assembly from 2002 to 2013. Served as minister of Law, Parliamentary Affairs, and Human Rights.
- Aghaz Ikramullah Gandapur, youngest ever member of KPK assembly, elected in 2018 following death of his father.
- Ali Amin Gandapur, Chief Minister of KPK, Former Federal Minister for Kashmir Affairs and Gilgit-Baltistan
- Faisal Amin Khan Gandapur, Former Provincial Minister of for Local Government, Elections, and Rural Development KPK (2021-2023), Member of National Assembly

=== Jadoon ===
- Iqbal Khan Jadoon, Former Chief Minister, NWFP
- Amanullah Khan Jadoon, Former Minister of Petroleum and Gas.

=== Khattak ===
- Habibullah Khan Khattak
- Ali Kuli Khan Khattak, Military General
- Ghulam Faruque Khan
- Nasrullah Khan Khattak
- Ajmal Khattak
- Afrasiab Khattak
- Parvez Khattak

=== Kakazai (Loi Mamund) ===
- Ghulam Muhammad, (Governor General Of Pakistan)
- Malik Barkat Ali (Politician, Lawyer and Journalist)
- Ghulam Ahmad Bilour, Ex-Federal Minister for Railways, Pakistan
- Maulana Muhammad Ali Jauhar, National Leader, Khilafat Movement, India, 1930s
- Abdul Aleem Khan
- Malik Muhammad Akhtar, Ex-Federal Minister for Law and Parliamentary Affairs & Fuel Power and Natural Resources

=== Marwats ===
- Habibullah Khan Marwat, Justice of the West Pakistan High Court, first & second Chairman of the Senate of Pakistan, acting President of Pakistan, when the President Fazal Ilahi Chaudhry went abroad, Pakistan's Interior Minister and also Chief Minister of West Pakistan. Was elected to the first ever Legislative Council of Khyber Pakhtunkhwa (then North-West Frontier Province NWFP), first as a member and later Deputy Speaker.
- Sher Afzal Marwat, MNA Member National Assembly of Pakistan
- Shah Nawaz Khan, ex-Chief Justice of Khyber Pakhtunkhwa and Judge of the Supreme Court of Pakistan. He was also Governor of NWFP.

=== Mohmand ===
- Muhammad Ali Khan Mohmand
- Babar Ali Khan Mohmand

=== Tareen/Tarin ===
- Abdul Majid Khan Tarin, OBE, senior Muslim League figure.
- Ayub Khan, ex military dictator, second President of Pakistan (1958 – 1969)
- Begum Mahmooda Salim Khan, first female minister in the history of Pakistan
- Sardar Bahadur Khan, ex CM and minister
- Gohar Ayub Khan, former Speaker of the National Assembly and ex Foreign Minister
- Omar Ayub Khan, ex Minister of State for Finance
- Jehangir Khan Tareen, ex minister and political leader of the PTI party
- Shaukat Tarin, ex Federal Minister for Finance
- Yousuf Ayub Khan, politician and businessman

== Rajput ==
=== Alpial ===
- Iftikhar Ali Khan, former Chief of the General Staff.
- Chaudhary Nisar Ali Khan, 40th Interior Minister of Pakistan.

=== Chaudhary family of Narowal ===
- Chaudhry Abdul Rahman Khan, Member of the Punjab Legislative Assembly
- Nisar Fatima, MNA
- Ahsan Iqbal Chaudhary, former Interior Minister of Pakistan and incumbent Minister of Planning and development.
- Ahmad Iqbal Chaudhary, MPA

=== Myer Minhas Rajput ===
- Raja Muhammed Sarfraz Khan, MLC Punjab 1929, MLA 1937-58
- Muhammed Akbar Khan, Pakistan's first four star general
- Iftikhar Khan, Pakistan's first designated army chief
- Iffat Liaqat Ali Khan, Ex- Chairman Task Force Pakistan
- Sher Ali Khan, Minister Minerals and Mines Punjab
- Raja Riaz Ahmad Khan, Ex-Senior Minister Punjab, MNA
- Raja Yassir Humayun Sarfraz, Minister for Higher Education & IT, Punjab

=== Manj ===
- Amir Habibullah Khan Saadi, ruler of Talwan and former member of West Pakistan provincial assembly.
- Khurram Munawar Manj, MNA
- Javed Niaz Manj, incumbent MPA

=== Noon family ===
- Feroz Khan Noon (former Prime Minister of Pakistan, former Foreign Minister of Pakistan, former Chief Minister of Punjab).
- Malik Adnan Hayat Noon (former MNA)
- Malik Anwar Ali Noon (former MNA)
- Malik Amjad Ali Noon (former District Nazim)
- Viqar un Nisa Noon (former Federal Minister as well as a prominent social worker)
- Rana Muhammad Qasim Noon (Member of National Assembly NA-159 2018-23, MNA 2013-18, Former Minister)
- Rana Muhammad Faraz Noon, incumbent Member of National Assembly of Pakistan.

=== Raja ===
- Raja Pervez Ashraf, 17th Prime Minister of Pakistan.
- Raja Saroop Khan, former Governor of Punjab.
- Raja Zulqarnain Khan, 19th President of Azad Jammu and Kashmir.

=== Rana ===
- Rana Abdul Rauf, MPA District Bahawal Nagar
- Rana Mashood Ahmad Khan, Deputy Speaker of the Fourteenth Provincial Assembly of the Punjab in Pakistan
- Rana Muhammad Afzal
- Rana Muhammad Farooq Saeed Khan, (Member of National Assembly and Punjab Assembly) (Ex Federal Minister), President PPP Central Punjab
- Rana Sanaullah Khan, 39th Interior Minister of Pakistan

=== Rathore ===
- Raja Mumtaz Hussain Rathore, 3rd Prime Minister of Azad Jammu and Kashmir.
- Faisal Mumtaz Rathore, 16th Prime Minister of Azad Jammu and Kashmir.

=== Rana family of Sheikhupura ===
- Rana Tanveer Hussain, MNA former Federal Minister of Education, incumbent Federal Minister of Food and Nutrition
- Rana Afzaal Hussain, MNA
- Rana Ahmed Ateeq Anwar, MNA
- Rana Tahir Iqbal, MPA

=== Rana family of Phoolnagar ===
- Rana Phool Muhammad Khan, Ex Minister of agriculture, Ministry of Health, Law Minister of Pakistan, Caretaker Chief Minister of Punjab.
- Rana Muhammad Iqbal Khan, 16th Speaker of the Provincial Assembly of the Punjab, Acting Governor of Punjab in 2011.
- Rana Muhammad Hayat, MNA Member National Assembly of Pakistan.
- Rana Muhammad Ishaq, Former MNA Member National Assembly of Pakistan.
- Rana Sikandar Hayat, MPA Minister of School Education Punjab.

=== Rao Family of Okara ===
- Rao Mohammad Hashim Khan, Member of National Assembly, Ex-Chairman Public Accounts Committee (Pakistan).
- Rao Muhammad Afzal Khan, MPA from Sahiwal District Tehsil Depalpur.
- Rao Muhammad Ajmal Khan, Member of National Assembly, Son of Rao Muhammad Afzal Khan.
- Rao Sikandar Iqbal, Former Senior Minister and Defence Minister of Pakistan, Nephew of Rao Muhammad Afzal Khan.
- Rao Qaiser Ali Khan, Ex-Member of National Assembly, Parliamentary Secretary of Water and Power, Nephew of Rao Muhammad Afzal Khan.
- Rao Jamil Akhtar Khan, Tehsil Nazim Okara Nephew of Rao Muhammad Afzal Khan.

=== Ranghar ===
- Rao Farman Ali, 3rd National Security Advisor and Ex-Federal Minister.
- Rao Qamar Suleman, 12th Chief of Air Staff.
- Rao Kashif Raheem Khan, incumbent MPA

=== Tiwana family of Shahpur ===
- Malik Umar Hayat Khan Tiwana, a former Major General in the British Indian Army;
- Malik Khizar Hayat Tiwana the last Premier of the Punjab.
- Malik Khuda Buksh Tiwana, a former provincial minister;
- Malik Ghulam Muhammad Tiwana, former Members of the National Assembly
- Malik Ehsan Ullah Tiwana, former Members of the National Assembly
- Shahzadi Umerzadi Tiwana, a former minister and the daughter of Sir Khizar Hayat Tiwana and granddaughter of General Omar Hayat Tiwana

=== Sodha family of Umerkot ===
- Rana Chander Singh, was a Pakistani politician and a federal minister. He was one of the founder members of Pakistan Peoples Party (PPP) and was elected to the National Assembly of Pakistan from Umerkot, seven times with PPP between 1977 and 1999
- Rana Hamir Singh, a Pakistani politician who has been member of Provincial Assembly of Sindh.

== Other political families ==
Some other Pakistani political families come from single individual family's background or based on surname/titles include;

=== Bahram Khan Family ===
The members of Bahram Khan family who have been active in politics are:

- Khan Abdul Bahram Khan (1850-1922), the founder of the family
- Khan Abdul Jabbar Khan (1882–1958) ("Dr. Khan Sahib"), pioneer in the Indian Independence Movement and a Pakistani politician, son of Khan Abdul Bahram Khan
- Abdul Ghaffar Khan (1890–1988), also known as Bacha Khan, independence activist, son of Khan Abdul Bahram Khan
- Abdul Ghani Khan (1914–1996), widely considered as one of the best Pashto language poets of the 20th century, son of Abdul Ghaffar Khan
- Abdul Wali Khan (1917–2006), secular democratic socialist leader and opponent of the British Raj, son of Abdul Ghaffar Khan
- Abdul Ali Khan (1922-1997), educationist, the youngest son of Abdul Ghaffar Khan
- Nasim Wali Khan (1932-2021), Politician and wife of Abdul Wali Khan
- Asfandyar Wali Khan (born 1949), politician, son of Abdul Wali Khan
- Sangeen Wali Khan (1959–2008), politician, son of Abdul Wali Khan
- Aimal Wali Khan (born 1986), politician, son of Asfandyar Wali Khan

=== Bukharis ===
- Zulfi Bukhari, Special Assistant to Prime Minister Imran Khan
- Altaf Bukhari, Member in the Jammu and Kashmir Legislative Assembly
- Uzma Zahid Bukhari, Member of the Provincial Assembly of Punjab
- Zehra Batool, Member of the Provincial Assembly of the Punjab
  - Syed Basit Sultan Bukhari, Member of the National Assembly of Pakistan
- Ajiaz Hussain Shah Bukhari, Member of the Provincial Assembly of Sindh
- Syed Samsam Bukhari, Former Member of the National Assembly of Pakistan
- Syed Ata-ul-Muhaimin Bukhari, President of Majlis-e-Ahrar-ul-Islam
- Syed Yawer Abbas Bukhari, Member of the Provincial Assembly of the Punjab
- Nayyar Hussain Bukhari, Senior leader of the Pakistan Peoples Party (PPP)
- Ejaz Hussain Bukhari, Member of the Provincial Assembly of the Punjab

=== Daha ===
Daha family of Khanewal

- Nishat Khan Daha, Former MPA Member of the Provincial Assembly of the Punjab
- Muhammad Khan Daha, MNA Member of the National Assembly of Pakistan

=== Family of Imran Khan ===
Members of Imran Khan's family, who are noted mainly for contributions in sports and politics:

First Generation

- Wajid Ali Khan Burki, maternal uncle
- Jahangir Khan, maternal uncle
- Ahmed Raza, maternal uncle

Second Generation

- Imran Khan, the former Prime Minister and former cricket captain
  - Bushra Bibi, wife of Imran Khan
- Javed Burki, maternal cousin
- Jamshed Burki, maternal cousin
- Asad Jahangir, maternal cousin
- Majid Khan, maternal cousin
- Inamullah Niazi, paternal cousin

Third Generation

- Bazid Khan, son of Majid Khan and maternal first-cousin once removed

=== Hiraj ===
Hiraj family of Khanewal

- Raza Hayat Hiraj, MNA Member of the National Assembly of Pakistan
- Asghar Hayat, MPA Member of the Provincial Assembly of the Punjab
- Muhammad Akbar Hayat Hiraj, MPA Member of the Provincial Assembly of the Punjab
- Hamid Yar Hiraj, MNA former Member of the National Assembly of Pakistan

=== Kasuri Family of Kasur ===
- Khurshid Mahmud Kasuri, Former Federal Minister of Foreign Affairs Pakistan
- Mahmud Ali Kasuri, Former Minister for Law and Justice

Mokal Family of Kasur

- Waqas Hassan Mokal, Former MPA Member Provincial Assembly of Punjab, His Father Sardar Hassan Akhtar Mokal, Former MPA Member Provincial Assembly of Punjab

Nakai Family of Kasur

- Arif Nakai, Former Chief Minister of Punjab
- Sardar Talib Hassan Nakai, Former MNA Member National Assembly of Pakistan
- Sardar Asif Nakai, Former MPA Provincial Minister of Punjab for Communication and work

=== Makhdoom ===
- Makhdoom Shahabuddin, MNA former Member of the National Assembly of Pakistan
- Makhdoom Ahmed Mehmood, former Governor of Punjab Pakistan
- Faisal Saleh Hayat, MNA former Federal Minister of Interior
- Javed Hashmi, MNA former Federal Minister of youth affairs & sports
- Khusro Bakhtiar, MNA former Federal Minister of Industries
- Makhdoom Syed Murtaza Mehmood, MNA Member of the National Assembly of Pakistan
- Hashim Jawan Bakht, MPA former Provincil Minister of Finance
- Syed Usman Mehmood, MPA former Member of the Provincial Assembly of the Punjab

=== Qazi Family ===
Members of Qazi family (Urdu: خاندان قاضی), of Sindh in politics:

- Qazi Abdul Majeed Abid (Qazi Abid), a four-time Federal Minister, Sindh Provincial Minister, and son of Qazi Abdul Qayyum
- Fahmida Mirza, Speaker of the National Assembly, former Acting President of Pakistan, three-time Member of the National Assembly, and daughter of Qazi Abid
- Zulfiqar Mirza, Sindh Provincial Home Minister, former Member of the National Assembly, and nephew of Qazi Abid, Qazi Azam, and Qazi Akbar.
- Pir Mazhar Ul Haq, Senior Minister and Education Minister in the Sindh Provincial Cabinet, a three-time Sindh Provincial Minister, and grandson of Qazi Muhammad Akbar
- Marvi Mazhar, a former Member of the Provincial Assembly in Sindh and daughter of Pir Mazhar Ul Haq.

=== Qureshi ===
- Shah Mahmood Qureshi
- Mustafa Qureshi
- Zain Qureshi
- Makhdoom Qureshi
- Moin Qureshi

=== Ranjha Family of Kot Sher Muhammad ===
- Khalid Ranjha, former Federal Minister for Law and Senator of Pakistan
- Khalid Mahmood Ranjha, MPA Provincial Parliamentary for Law and Parliamentary Affairs
- Mian Manazir Hussain Ranjha, MPA former Provincial Minister and Deputy Speaker Punjab
- Mohsin Shahnawaz Ranjha, MNA former Federal Minister for State and Parliamentary Affairs, His Father Chaudhary Shahnawaz Ranjha, former MPA Member of the Provincial Assembly of the Punjab
- Chaudhry Imtiaz Ahmed Ranjha, FORMER MPA Member of the Provincial Assembly of the Punjab

=== Saifullah Khan family ===
- Begum Kulsum Saifullah Khan, member of Majlis-Shoora of General Zia-ul-Haq
- Salim Saifullah Khan, Senator of Pakistan, President Pakistan Muslim League
- Anwar Saifullah Khan, MPA, Senator, and former federal minister, and son-in-law of President Ghulam Ishaq Khan.
- Humayun Saifullah Khan, MNA.

=== Sharif (Butt) ===
- Nawaz Sharif, Ex Prime Minister of Pakistan(exile from country by gen. Musharaf in 1999 thru Martial Law)
- Shahbaz Sharif, Prime Minister of Pakistan (exile from country by gen. Musharaf in 1999 thru Martial Law)
- Hamza Shahbaz Sharif, Son of Shahbaz Shareef, (Member of National Assembly of Pakistan,Chief Minister of Punjab (Pakistan)
- Hussain Nawaz son of Nawaz Sharif (Prime Minister of Pakistan)
- Maryam Nawaz, daughter of Nawaz Sharif and wife of Rtd. Captain Safdar

=== Soomro ===
- Khan Bahadur Allah Bux Soomro, Twice Chief Minister of Sindh
- Elahi Bux Soomro, remained Member of National Assembly of Pakistan, Speaker National Assembly of Pakistan, Federal Minister
- Rahim Bux Soomro, Minister Sindh
- Mohammad Mian Soomro, remained President of Pakistan, Prime Minister of Pakistan, Senate of Pakistan and Governor of Sindh

=== Swati Family of Mansehra ===
Swati is a notable land-owning family of District Mansehra and District Battagram which controls the politics of these two districts dating back to pre-partition India.

Gabri Swati Family

- Babar Saleem Khan Swati (Speaker KPK Assembly, MPA Mansehra II, current Khan Of Mansehra City)
- Munir Lughmani Swati (Current MPA Mansehra I)
- Zahid Chanzeb Swati (Current MPA Mansehra III)
- Khan Khudadad Khan Swati (Freedom Fighter of Pakistan Independence Movement, member of All India Muslim league, 1st Minister of Health West Pakistan and Ex- Chief of Siran Valley Mansehra)
- Saleh Muhammad Khan Swati (MNA of Mansehra District)
- Nawab Zada Wali Muhammad Khan(He remained MPA of Battagram District which was former part of Mansehra District)
- Prince Nawaz Khan Swati ( MNA of District Battagram, Prince of Allai, Son of Nawab Muhammad Ayub Khan Swati, Last Nawab of Independent Allai State)
- Reham Khan Swati (BBC journalist, former wife of Imran Khan, belongs to landlord family of Baffa Mansehra)
- Abdul Hakeem Khan Swati (Ex-Governor Khyber Pakhtoon Khwa Province, uncle of Reham Khan, Ex- Khan of Baffa Pakhal)
- Bashir Khan Jehangiri Swati (17th Chief Justice of Pakistan)
- Mufti Kifayat Ullah Khan Swati (Ex-MNA Mansehra III, famous religious scholar)
- Muhammad Nawaz Khan Swati (current MNA of Battagram)
- Abrar Ahmed Swati ( Famous Pakistani Cricketer)
- Ghulam Ghaus Hazarvi (Well Known Islamic Scholar and Politician)
- Haji Muhammad Yousaf Khan Swati( 8 times elected MPA of Battagram I, Current Khan of Trand Village)
- Khan Mohammad Abbas Khan (Former MLA of Indian National Congress, served as the Interim Minister (sic) for Industries, Freedom fighter and an Active Member of Pakistan Muslim League
- Haroon Khan Badshah (Member of Provincial Assembly of Khyber Pakhtunkhwa, ex-provincial Minister for Agriculture Khyber-Pakhtunkhwa)
- Shahzada Muhammad Gustasap Khan (Current MNA Mansehra-cum-Torghar)

Mitravi Swati Family

- Azam Khan Swati (Senator, former federal Minister of Railways, former federal minister of Narcotics Control, former federal minister of Science and Technology, current Chief of Sherpur, Mansehra District)
- Waji-Uz-Zaman Khan Swati ( Current royal Chief of Agror Valley, Mansehra)
- Laiq Muhammad Swati (He is the Ex-MNA current MPA of Torghar District which was former part of Mansehra District. He is also the younger brother of Azam Swati)

=== Tanoli ===
- Mir Painda Khan
- Nawabzada Salahuddin Saeed Current Nawab of State of Amb
- Ibrar Hussain current MPA and ex Forest Minister

=== Zia-ul-Haq Family ===
- Muhammad Zia-ul-Haq (President of Pakistan, 1978–1988)
- Muhammad Ijaz-ul-Haq (Member of the National Assembly)

== See also ==
- First Families of Pakistan
- Politics of Pakistan
