= Cheema (surname) =

Clan and surname in Pakistan and India

Cheema (also spelled Chima) is a Punjabi Jat clan and surname in Pakistan and India.

Cheemas were historically recorded among the tribes of the Rachna Doab.

== Notable people ==
=== Pakistan ===
- Afzal Cheema (1913–2008), judge, politician, Acting President of Pakistan
- Aizaz Cheema (born 1979), Pakistani cricketer
- Amir Cheema (c.1978 – 2006), Pakistani who assaulted an editor over Muhammad's cartoons
- Anwar Ali Cheema, Member, National Assembly (MNA) of Pakistan (1985 to 2013) from Sargodha District
- Chaudhry Aamir Sultan Cheema, Pakistani politician
- Iftikhar Cheema, judge and politician
- Nisar Ahmed Cheema, Pakistani politician, MNA and former DG Punjab Health Services
- Omer Sarfraz Cheema, Pakistani politician, ex-Punjab Governor
- Pervaiz Iqbal Cheema (1940–2019), Pakistani scholar of international relations and strategic studies
- Saifullah Cheema, Pakistani military officer and politician
- Shafqat Cheema, Pakistani film actor and director
- Sultan Ahmed Cheema (1908–1990), ophthalmologist who established the Cheema Hospital in Daska, Punjab, Pakistan
- Tariq Bashir Cheema, former Pakistan Peoples Party member from Bahawalpur District
- Umar Cheema, Pakistani journalist

=== India ===
- Amrik Singh Cheema (1918–1982), Indian civil servant
- Amrita Cheema, Indian journalist working in India, Germany, Australia
- Avtar Singh Cheema (1933–1989), Indian alpinist, first Indian to climb Mount Everest
- Balli Singh Cheema, Indian politician
- Daljit Singh Cheema, Indian politician
- Jaspinder Cheema, Indian actress and model
- Navtej Singh Cheema, Indian politician
- Neena Cheema, Indian TV and film actress
- Palwinder Singh Cheema, Indian wrestler
- Paul Cheema Singh, Indian sports shooter
- Sajjan Singh Cheema (born 1957), Indian basketball player
- Sarbjit Cheema, Indian singer and actor
- Surinder Pal Singh Cheema, Indian Navy admiral

=== Canada ===
- Gulzar Singh Cheema (born 1954), Indian-born Canadian physician and politician
- Ranjit Cheema (died 2012), Indian-Canadian gangster and drug trader
- Rizwan Cheema (born 1978), Pakistani-born Canadian cricketer

=== United Kingdom ===
- Bobbie Cheema-Grubb (born 1966), first British Indian and Asian woman to serve as a High Court judge in the United Kingdom

== See also ==
- List of Punjabi tribes
- Chattha (clan)
- Chima (disambiguation) § People
