= Babar =

Babar (Urdu: بابر), also variously spelled as Baber, Babur, and Babor is a male given name of Persian origin. It is generally taken in reference to the Persian babr (Persian: ببر), meaning "tiger". There is a similar name in connotation to the Arabic male given form and generic name of the animal by the name "Nimr" (Arabic: نَمِر namir) which means "yellow-black striped cat", i.e. "tiger". The word repeatedly appears in Ferdowsi's Shahnameh and was borrowed into the Turkic languages of Central Asia.

Thackston argues for an alternate derivation from the PIE word "beaver", pointing to similarities between the pronunciation Bābor and the Russian bobr (бобр, "beaver").

== People ==
- Babur (1483–1530), also spelled Baber or Babar, Turkic ruler of present-day India and founder of the Mughal Empire in India
- Babar Ahmad (born 1974), British citizen imprisoned on terrorism charges
- Babar Ahmed (director), Pakistani-born American film director
- Babar Ali (disambiguation)
  - Babar Ali (born 1975), Pakistani actor
  - Babar Ali (cricketer) (born 1986), Pakistani cricketer
  - Babar Ali (teacher) (born 1993), Indian educator
  - Babar Ali Khan (1773–1810), Nawab of Bengal, Bihar, and Orissa
  - Babar Ali Khan (boxer) (1963–2025), Pakistani boxer
  - Babar Ali Khan Mohmand (born 1983), Pakistani politician
- Babar Awan (born 1958), Pakistani writer and politician
- Babar Azam (born 1994), Pakistani cricketer
- Babar Bhatti (born 1949), British actor
- Babar Hayat (born 1992), Pakistani-born Hong Kong cricketer
- Babar Khan (born 1987), Pakistani actor and model
- Babar Khan (cricketer) (born 1993), Pakistani cricketer
- Babar Luck (born 1970), Pakistani-born British musician
- Babar Khan Ghauri (born 1961), Pakistani politician
- Babar Nawaz Khan (born 1986), Pakistani politician
- Babar Naeem (born 1983), Pakistani cricketer
- Babar Rehman (born 1984), Pakistani cricketer
- Diana Babar, British solicitor
- Fahad Babar (born 1992), Pakistani-born American cricketer
- Farhatullah Babar, Pakistani politician
- Ilyas Babar (1926–2002), Indian athletic coach
- Lutfozzaman Babar (born 1958), Bangladeshi politician
- Mohammed Junaid Babar (born c. 1975), Pakistani American news figure
- Naseerullah Babar (1928–2011), Pakistani general and cabinet minister
- Rahat N. Babar, American judge
- Wali Khan Babar (1982–2011), Pakistani journalist
- Zulfiqar Babar (born 1978), Pakistani cricketer (Bowler)

== Fiction ==
- Babar the Elephant, fictional character from a French children's book series
