= Noon (surname) =

Surname in India, Pakistan, Europe and North America

- Jāti: Jat and Rajput
- Religions: Islam, Hinduism & Sikhism
- Languages: Punjabi
- Country: India, Pakistan
- Region: Punjab
- Ethnicity: Punjabi
- Feudal title: Malik

Noon is a surname and Punjabi clan of India and Pakistan. They are categorized both Rajput and Jat. It can also be a variant of Noone, a surname of Gaelic origin.

Notable people with the surname, who may or may not be affiliated with the clan, are listed below.

== People with the surname Noon ==
=== People from Pakistan and India ===
- Feroz Khan Noon (1893 – 1970), 7th Prime minister of Pakistan & former Chief Minister of Punjab.
- Viqar un Nisa Noon (1920 – 2000), wife of the 7th Prime Minister of Pakistan, Feroz Khan Noon.
- Gulam Noon, Baron Noon (1936 – 2015), British-Indian businessman and member of House of Lords.
- Rana Muhammad Qasim Noon, Pakistani Politician and Former Minister.
- Malik Adnan Hayat Noon, Pakistani politician and member of the Noon family of Pakistan.
- Malik Amjad Ali Noon, Pakistani politician.
- Malik Anwer Ali Noon (1924 – 2014), politician and landlord of Sargodha in the Noon family.

=== People from elsewhere ===
- Brady Noon, (born 2005), American child-actor
- Carole C. Noon, American primatologist
- Colin Noon, rugby union footballer for Leeds Tykes
- David Noon (born 1946), American composer
- Ed Noon, character in Michael Avallone's novels
- Frank Noon, Def Leppard's second drummer
- Gladys Noon Spellman, U.S. Congresswoman
- Jamie Noon, English rugby union player
- Jeff Noon, (born 1957), English science fiction author
- Mark Noon, semi-professional English football player
- Micky Noon, professional English football player
- Steve Noon, British artist
- Thomas Noon Talfourd, English judge and author
- Vicki Noon, American theater performer
- Wayne Noon, English cricketer
- Will Noon, drummer of Straylight Run and the former drummer of Breaking Pangaea
- William Noon, American politician

== See also ==
- Noon (disambiguation)
- Noone
