= Ranjha (clan) =

Jat clan

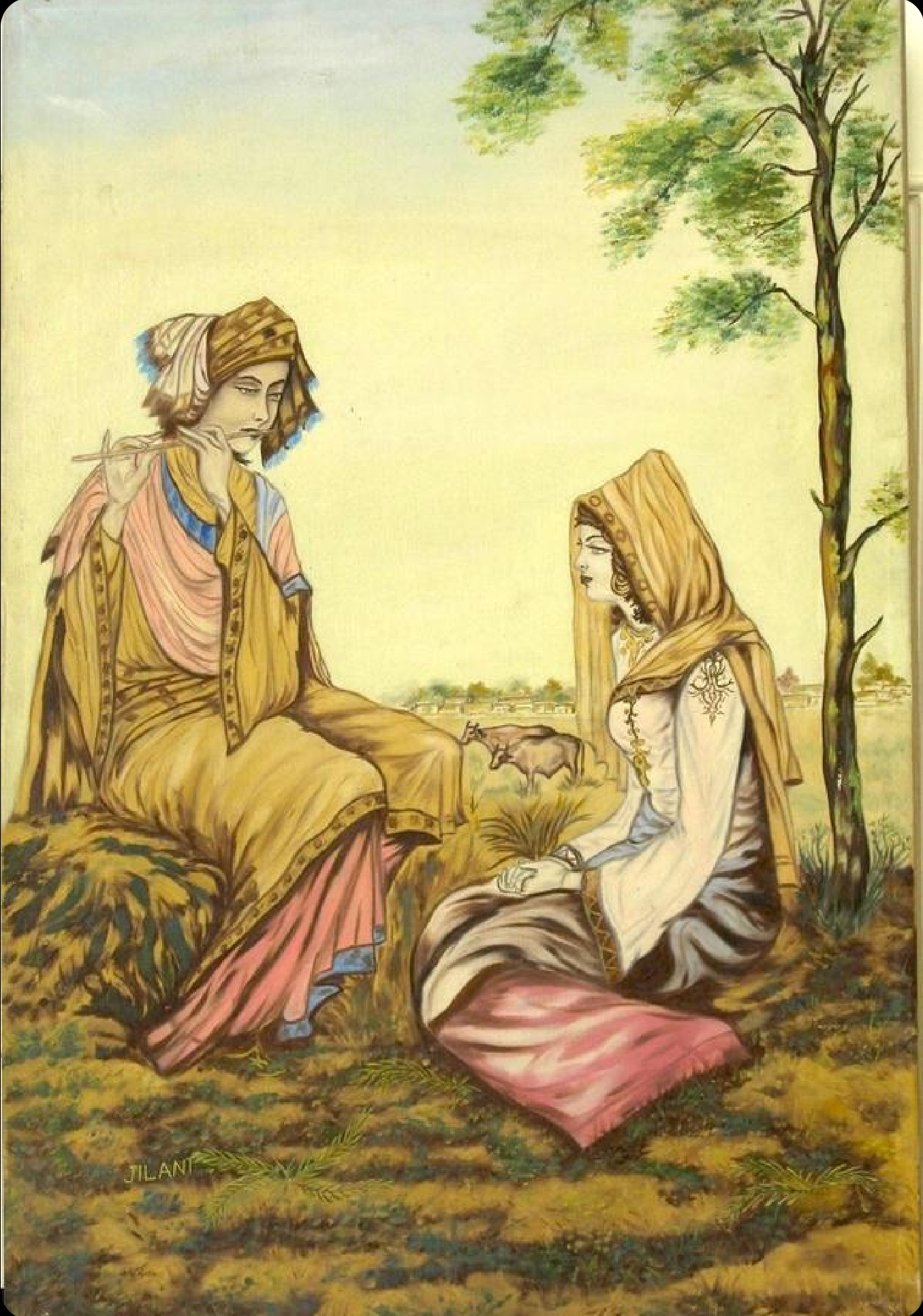
- Heer Ranjha, a Punjabi folktale
- Jāti: Jat
- Religions: Islam
- Languages: Punjabi
- Country: Pakistan
- Region: Punjab
- Ethnicity: Punjabi
- Related groups: Jats

The Ranjha are a Punjabi Jat clan from Punjab region of Pakistan. They are found throughout Mandi Bahauddin, Sargodha, Gujrat and Jhelum districts. The clan is famous for association with Deedo Ranjha, the protagonist of the Punjabi folktale Heer Ranjha.

== Notable people ==
- Hafiz Barkhurdar Ranjha
- Mohsin Shahnawaz Ranjha
- Khalid Ranjha
- Chaudhry Imtiaz Ahmed Ranjha
- Mian Manazir Hussain Ranjha

== See also ==
- Punjabi Muslims
- List of Punjabi Muslims
