= Amrik =

Amrik is an Indian masculine given name that may refer to

- Amrik Anand (born 1947), Indian cricketer
- Amrik Singh (1948–1984), President of the Indian Sikh Students Federation
- Amrik Singh Cheema (1918–1982), Indian civil servant and author
- Amrik Singh Dhillon, Punjabi Sikh Indian politician
- Amrik Virk (born 1963 or 1964), Canadian politician
