= Rao Qaiser Ali Khan =

Pakistani politician

Rao Qaiser Ali Khan was a Pakistani politician who served as a Member of the National Assembly (MNA) representing the NA-112 constituency in Okara District. He was elected to the National Assembly in the 1990, 1993, and 1997 general elections.

== Political career ==
- 1990 General Elections: Rao Qaiser Ali Khan contested the NA-112 (Okara) seat and defeated the Pakistan People’s Party (PPP) candidate, Rao Muhammad Afzal Khan.
- 1993 General Elections: Running on a Pakistan Muslim League-Nawaz (PML-N) ticket, he secured 55,132 votes, surpassing the PPP candidate, Rao Muhammad Afzal Khan, who received 42,680 votes.
- 1997 General Elections: He again won the NA-112 seat, obtaining 46,697 votes, defeating Pakistan Muslim League-Junejo (PML-J) candidate Manzoor Wattoo, who garnered 26,449 votes.

During his tenure, Rao Qaiser Ali Khan served as the Parliamentary Secretary for Water and Power.

== Family and political connections ==
Rao Qaiser Ali Khan was part of a prominent political family from Okara:

- Rao Muhammad Afzal Khan: His uncle, brother of his mother who served as a Member of the Provincial Assembly (MPA) from Sahiwal District, Tehsil Depalpur.
- Rao Muhammad Ajmal Khan: His first cousin, who served as a Member of the National Assembly.
- Rao Sikandar Iqbal: Another first cousin, who held the position of Federal Minister.
- Rao Jamil Akhtar Khan: First cousin who served as Tehsil Nazim of Okara.
- Rao Farman Ali: Family member who served in the Pakistan Army.
- Rao Qamar Suleman: Family member who served in the Pakistan Air Force.

== Death ==
Rao Qaiser Ali Khan died on January 24, 2013. His funeral prayers were held in Mazharabad after Asr prayers.
