= Piyong Temjen Jamir =

Indian literary scholar (1934–2021)

- Born: 10 June 1934; Longsa, Mokokchung, Nagaland
- Died: 12 June 2021 (aged 87); Dimapur, Nagaland
- Occupation: Hindi littérateur

Padma Shri Piyong Temjen Jamir (10 June 1934 – 12 June 2021) was a noted Hindi scholar and littérateur from Longsa village under Mokokchung district in Nagaland state of India. He was conferred the Padma Sri honour by the President of India, Ram Nath Kovind, in 2018 for the promotion of Hindi language and social work.

== Early life ==
Born in 1934 at Longsa village under Mokokchung district in Nagaland, Shri M. Piyong Temjen Jamir was well known for his interests in the Hindi language. Jamir was the first Graduate and B.Ed. Degree holder in Hindi among the Nagas. He was also the sole crusader of the Hindi language in Nagaland. His dedication to promoting the Hindi language and also social service has been acknowledged with many awards over the past few decades. He studied at the RPS’ Wardha Institute located in Maharashtra.

== Career ==
He spent years as a Hindi teacher in his home state. He was the principal of the Rashtrabhasha Hindi Shiksha Sansthan located in Dimapur, Nagaland.

He was ridiculed by his own people for his love of the Hindi language and for teaching Hindi. He was the sole crusader for the language in Nagaland where the Hindi language came to lose favorable interest during the separatist movement. He was also the principal of the Rashtrabhasha Prachar Samiti (RPS) in the 1970s to promote the language.

He started working as a Hindi teacher at GHS Chisor under Tuensang district in 1970 and was soon promoted as an instructor at CHTTI (Central Hindi Teachers Training Institute) Dimapur in the year 1976. He served there until 1982. Later, Jamir re-established the Rashtra Bhasha Hindi Training Institute in Dimapur which had classes from Prathmik to Ratna. With the desire to spread Hindi all over Nagaland, Jamir established branches of Hindi Training Institutes in different districts of Nagaland, most of which are now registered and running independently.

Jamir was the founder President of Vidya Bharati Jan Jaati Shiksha Samiti, of North-Eastern India, and Chairman of Nagri Lipi Parishad Nagaland. He happened to be the first from the North East region to attend the World Hindi Conference at the 7th World Hindi Conference held in Surinam (South America) in 2003.

He also attended the 9th World Hindi Conference at Johannesburg, South Africa in 2012, where he was felicitated for his contribution in the field of Hindi. He was a Member of the advisory board for the development of Hindi in North East India under the Ministry of Human Resource Development, Government of India for a term of three years from 2012 – 2015.

His dedication to promoting the Hindi language and also social service has been acknowledged with many awards over the past few decades. In 2006, he received the Ganga Sharan Singh Award from the 11th President of India, APJ Abdul Kalam. He was conferred the Padma Sri honour by the President of India, Ram Nath Kovind, in 2018 for his contribution in the field of literature and education.

Jamir was awarded the ‘Bhaurao Devras Seva Samman Award’ on March 29, 2005, in Lucknow by the then Chief Minister of Madhya Pradesh Shri Babulal Gaur. He was also awarded the ‘Vir Jadonang Award’ by the then Governor of Nagaland, Shri Shyamal Dutta on August 29, 2005.

He was also an Awardee of District Teachers award on September 5, 2006, in Dimapur, Nagaland, and felicitated by the CSOM (Children Special Oriented Ministry) on June 28, 2006. In the same year, Jamir received the ‘Gangashanan Singh Awards’ from the then President of India, Dr. A. P. J. Abdual Kalam, in New Delhi.

Jamir was also conferred the ‘Benoba Nagri lipi award’ at New Delhi by Lt. Nirmala Pande MP in 2007 and the ‘Indira Gandhi National Unity’ by the then Governor of Nagaland Sankaranarayan on August 15, 2007, in the state capital, Kohima. He was also awarded the ONE ‘One India Award’ a Mumbai-based NGO ‘My Home India’ on May 15, 2010, by Shri. Eknath Thakur, former MP, and chairman, Saraswat Co-Operative Bank.

He was presented with the ‘Jewel of North East Award’ at Delhi by the Friendship Forum in 2014.

== Death ==
Padma Shree Piyong Temjen Jamir died at his residence in Dimapur after a prolonged illness on Saturday, June 12, 2021. He was 87 years old. He is survived by his wife, four sons, and two daughters.
