= Zulfiqar Ali Bhatti (politician, born 1963) =

Pakistan politician

- ذوالفقارعلی بھٹی

Member of the National Assembly of Pakistan
- Incumbent
- Assumed office 29 February 2024
- Constituency: NA-85 Sargodha-IV
- In office 4 November 2022 – 10 August 2023
- Preceded by: Chaudhry Aamir Sultan Cheema
- Succeeded by: Himself
- Constituency: NA-91 (Sargodha-IV)
- In office 13 August 2018 – February 2019
- Preceded by: Himself
- Succeeded by: Chaudhry Aamir Sultan Cheema
- Constituency: NA-91 (Sargodha-IV)
- In office 1 June 2013 – 31 May 2018
- Succeeded by: Himself
- Constituency: NA-67 (Sargodha-IV)

Personal details
- Born: 1 October 1963 (age 63)
- Party: PMLN (2013–present)

Zulfiqar Ali Bhatti (Urdu: ذوالفقار علی بھٹی; born 1 October 1963) is a Pakistani politician who was a member of the National Assembly of Pakistan since February 2024 and previously served in this position from November 2022 to August 2023, from August 2018 to February 2019, and from June 2013 to May 2018.

== Early life ==
He was born on 1 October 1963.

== Political career ==
He ran for the seat of the National Assembly of Pakistan as a candidate of Pakistan Peoples Party (PPP) from Constituency NA-67 (Sargodha-IV) in the 2008 Pakistani general election but was unsuccessful. He received 66,392 votes and lost the seat to Anwar Ali Cheema.

He was elected to the National Assembly of Pakistan as a candidate of Pakistan Muslim League (N) (PML-N) from Constituency NA-67 (Sargodha-IV) in the 2013 Pakistani general election. He received 109,132 votes and defeated Anwar Ali Cheema.

He was re-elected to the National Assembly as a candidate of PML-N from NA-91 (Sargodha-IV) in 2018 Pakistani general election. In August 2018, the Lahore High Court barred the Election Commission of Pakistan (ECP) from issuing victory notification for Bhatti after the runner-up candidate Chaudhry Aamir Sultan Cheema, a candidate of Pakistan Tehreek-e-Insaf (PTI), moved the ECP and challenged the victory of Bhatti. Following which the ECP ordered re-polling in the constituency.

On 2 February, re-polling was held in NA-91 (Sargodha-IV) in which Bhatti lost the seat to Chaudhry Aamir Sultan Cheema. His membership was consequently revoked in February 2019.

He successfully challenged the re-polling decision in the Supreme Court of Pakistan and his membership was reinstated on 4 November 2022.

He was re-elected to the National Assembly as a candidate of PML-N from NA-85 Sargodha-IV in the 2024 Pakistani general election. He received 121,015 votes and defeated Mian Khudadad Kalyar, an Independent politician candidate supported by Pakistan Tehreek-e-Insaf (PTI).
