= Yarlagadda Lakshmi Prasad =

Indian author

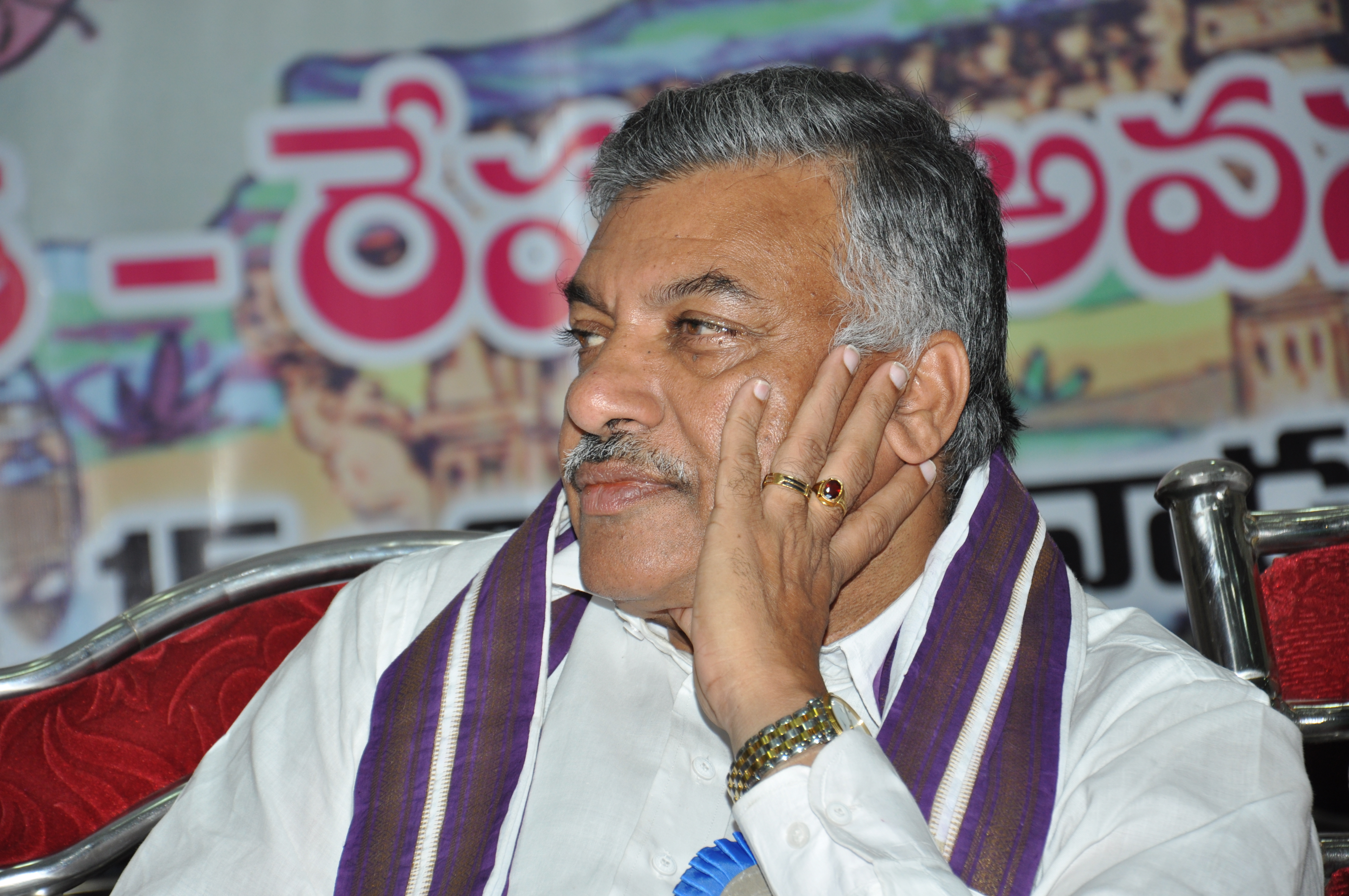
- Yarlagadda Lakshmi Prasad at 2nd World Telugu Writer's Conference

Member of Parliament, Rajya Sabha
- In office 10 April 1996 – 9 April 2002
- Preceded by: M. M. Hashim
- Succeeded by: Ravula Chandra Sekar Reddy
- Constituency: Andhra Pradesh

Yarlagadda Lakshmi Prasad is an Indian writer and politician. He was the Chairman of the A.P. Hindi Academy, Professor in Hindi at Andhra University, Visakhapatnam, India, and is a former Rajya Sabha from Andhra Pradesh. In 2019, Andhra Pradesh Government appointed him as the Chairman of three posts namely., ie Andhra Pradesh Official Language Commission, Andhra Pradesh Hindi Academy and Andhra Pradesh Telugu Bhasha Abhivriddhi Samstha.

Following the Andhra Pradesh Chief Minister's proposal to change the name of Dr. NTR University of Health Sciences (NTRUHS) to Dr. YSR University of Health Sciences (YSRUHS), Mr Prasad announced his resignation as the Chairman of all the three posts. He was sentimentally and emotionally attached to former Chief Minister N. T. Rama Rao.

== Literary works ==
- Attadugu nundi Agrasthanam varaku
- Doctor Karan Singh (biography)
- Draupadi
- Harivamsrai Bachhan (biography)
- Kathanala Venuka Kathalu
- Mana Governor Narayanadutt Tiwari
- Puchalapalli Sundarayya (biography)
- Satyabhama (novel)
- Pakisthan lo Padi Rojulu

== Awards ==
- Padma Shri - 2003
- Sahitya Akademi Award - 2010
- Ganga Sharan Singh Award - 2012
- Padma Bhushan - 2016
