= Rana Aftab Ahmad Khan =

Pakistani politician (born 1952)

Provincial Minister of Punjab for Planning and Development
- In office 1994–1995

Member of the Provincial Assembly of the Punjab
- Incumbent
- Assumed office 24 February 2024
- In office 2002–2007
- In office 1993–1996
- In office 1988–1990

Personal details
- Born: 3 August 1952 (age 74) Faisalabad, Punjab, Pakistan
- Party: PTI (2017-present)
- Other political affiliations: PPP (1988-2017)
- Relatives: Rao Muhammad Afzal Khan

Rana Aftab Ahmad Khan is a Pakistani politician who has served multiple terms in the Provincial Assembly of Punjab.

He began his political journey with the Pakistan Peoples Party (PPP) in 1988, winning three non-consecutive terms as a member of the provincial assembly of Punjab between 1988 and 2002. During his tenure with the PPP, he served as the Provincial Minister for Planning and Development in the provincial cabinet of Punjab Chief Minister Manzoor Wattoo from 1994 to 1995. During his time with PPP, he held key positions in the party such as Punjab President and Punjab General Secretary.

In 2017, he parted ways with the PPP and joined the Pakistan Tehreek-e-Insaf (PTI). He was re-elected to the Punjab Assembly in 2024 and was nominated as PTI's candidate for the Chief Minister of Punjab.

== Early life and education ==
He was born on 3 August 1952 in Faisalabad to Irshad Muhammad Khan, who was elected as a Member of the Provincial Assembly of the Punjab in the 1977 Pakistani general election.

He earned his LL.B. degree in 1973 and an M.A. in political science in 1975 from the University of the Punjab, Lahore.

== Political career ==
Aftab made his parliamentary debut in the 1988 Pakistani general election, when he was elected for the first time as a Member of the Provincial Assembly of the Punjab, representing Constituency PP-52 (Faisalabad) as a candidate of the Pakistan Peoples Party (PPP). He secured 34,356 votes, defeating an independent candidate Muhammad Iqbal Ayubi who received 30,282 votes.

In the 1990 Pakistani general election, he contested for the Provincial Assembly seat of Punjab as a People's Democratic Alliance candidate from Constituency PP-52 Faisalabad-X. However, he was defeated by Talib Hussain of the Islami Jamhoori Ittehad, securing 24,334 votes compared to Talib's 33,847 votes.

In the 1993 Pakistani general election, he was re-elected as a Member of the Provincial Assembly of the Punjab, representing Constituency PP-52 (Faisalabad) as a candidate of the PPP. He secured 36,268 votes, defeating Muhammad Afzal Sahi of the Pakistan Muslim League (N) (PML-N), who received 34,038 votes. During his tenure as member of the Punjab Assembly, he served as Provincial Minister for Planning and Development from 1994 to 1995 in the provincial cabinet of Punjab Chief Minister Manzoor Wattoo.

In the 1997 Pakistani general election, he contested for the Provincial Assembly seat of Punjab as a PPP candidate from Constituency PP-52 Faisalabad-X. However, he was defeated by Talib Hussain of the PML-N, securing 18,450 votes compared to Talib's 36,957 votes.

In 2001, he was appointed as the Punjab General Secretary of the PPP, a position he held until 2006. During the Alliance for Restoration of Democracy movement in the country, Benazir Bhutto appointed him as the party's divisional President of Faisalabad as he led numerous protest rallies across the Punjab advocating for the revival of democracy in the country. He held this position for five years.

He was re-elected as a Member of the Provincial Assembly of the Punjab as a candidate of PPP from Constituency PP-63 (Faisalabad-XIII) for the third time in 2002 Pakistani general election. He received 30,078 votes and defeated Dr. Muhammad Yaseen, a candidate of Pakistan Muslim League (Q) who received 28,352 votes. During his tenure as Member of the Punjab Assembly, he served as the Deputy Parliamentary Leader of the PPP in Punjab Assembly from 2005 to 2007 and was considered one of the most outspoken opposition leaders who fearlessly confronted the ruling Pakistan Muslim League (Q) (PML-Q) in Punjab during Pervez Musharraf's rule.

In the 2008 Pakistani general election, he contested for the Provincial Assembly seat of Punjab as a PPP candidate from Constituency PP-63 Faisalabad-XIII. However, he was narrowly defeated by Muhammad Ajmal Asif of PML-Q, securing 28,958 votes compared to Asif's 29,413 votes. It was reported that he narrowly lost the election. Had he won, he would have likely secured a position in the then Punjab Cabinet as the Senior Minister, instead of Raja Riaz.

In October 2008, after an overwhelming majority of PPP's central Executive Committee members from Punjab voted in favor of Rana Aftab, he was appointed as the 13th President of PPP Punjab by PPP chief and then President of Pakistan, Asif Ali Zardari, replacing Shah Mahmood Qureshi.

He contested for the Provincial Assembly seat of Punjab as a PPP candidate from Constituency PP-63 Faisalabad-XIII in by-election held on 14 May 2010, however he was again defeated by Muhammad Ajmal Asif of PML-N, securing 22,233 votes compared to Asif's 31,117 votes. By-election was conducted in the constituency following the resignation of Muhammad Ajmal Asif himself, who faced charges of possessing a fake degree. Aftab also had challenged Ajmal's nomination papers in the Lahore High Court, alleging that the Returning Officer (RO) accepted Ajmal's nomination papers despite knowing that Ajmal had resigned due to possessing a fake degree. Aftab claimed that he had raised this objection before the RO, but no action was taken. However, the court rejected Aftab's plea, stating that he should have contested Ajmal's qualification directly with the Returning Officer during the nomination process. Aftab emphasized that there was evident discrimination in this case and urged the Election Commission of Pakistan as well the superior judiciary to take notice of the matter.

Following his defeat in the by-election, he resigned as the president of PPP Punjab in May 2010. He stated that he resigned from the office on moral grounds, as he believed he had no justification to continue as the provincial party chief after losing the by-poll.

On 14 November 2017, he announced to end his long-standing association with PPP and joined Pakistan Tehreek-e-Insaf (PTI). He mentioned that he had not been invited to meetings of the PPP's central executive committee for past many years.

In the 2018 Pakistani general election, he contested for the Provincial Assembly seat of Punjab as a PTI candidate from Constituency PP-108 Faisalabad-XI. However, he was again defeated by Muhammad Ajmal Asif of PML-N, securing 43,471 votes compared to Asif's 46,055 votes.

In the 2024 Pakistani general election, he was re-elected as a Member of the Provincial Assembly of the Punjab, representing Constituency PP-108 Faisalabad-XI as a PTI-backed candidate. He secured 60,677 votes, defeating Muhammad Ajmal Asif of PML-N, who received 56,843 votes.

On February 25, 2024, he was nominated by PTI as their candidate for the election of Chief Minister of Punjab. This decision came after Mian Aslam Iqbal, originally slated for the position, encountered attempts of arrest by the Punjab Police. The same day, he submitted his nomination papers for the office of Punjab Chief Minister, competing against Maryam Nawaz of PML-N. The next day, his opponent, Maryam Nawaz, was elected unopposed as the Chief Minister of Punjab after securing 220 votes. This occurred after PTI decided to boycott the elections following Rana Aftab's request to address the House was denied by the speaker, Malik Ahmad Khan. As a result, 103 MPs of PTI walked out in protest and Rana Aftab did not receive any votes.
