= NA-85 Sargodha-IV =

Constituency of the National Assembly of Pakistan

- Constituency for the National Assembly of Pakistan
- Region: Sillanwali Tehsil and Sargodha Tehsil (partly) of Sargodha District
- Electorate: 507,216

Current constituency
- Party: Pakistan Muslim League (N)
- Member: Zulfiqar Ali Bhatti
- Created from: NA-67 Sargodha-IV

NA-85 Sargodha-IV (این اے-85، سرگودھا-٤) is a constituency for the National Assembly of Pakistan.

== Members of Parliament ==
=== 1988–2002: NA-50 Sargodha-IV ===
Election	Member	Party
1988	Chaudhry Anwar Ali Cheema	IJI
1990	Chaudhry Anwar Ali Cheema	IJI
1993	Chaudhry Anwar Ali Cheema	PML-N
1997	Chaudhry Anwar Ali Cheema	PML-N

=== 2002–2018: NA-67 Sargodha-IV ===
Election	Member	Party
2002	Chaudhry Anwar Ali Cheema	PML-Q
2008	Chaudhry Anwar Ali Cheema	PML-Q
2013	Zulfiqar Ali Bhatti	PML-N

=== 2018–2023: NA-91 Sargodha-IV ===
Election	Member	Party
2018	Zulfiqar Ali Bhatti	PML-N
2019	Chaudhry Aamir Sultan Cheema	PTI
2022	Zulfiqar Ali Bhatti	PML-N

=== 2024–present: NA-85 Sargodha-IV ===
Election	Member	Party
2024	Zulfiqar Ali Bhatti	PML-N

== Election 2002 ==
General elections were held on 10 October 2002. Chaudhry Anwar Ali Cheema of PML-Q won by 84,919 votes.

General election 2002: NA-67 Sargodha-IV
Party	Candidate	Votes	%	±%
PML(Q)	Ch. Anwar Ali Cheema	84,919	58.51	
MMA	Shams Naveed Cheema	38,136	26.23	
PPP	Ch. Hafeez Ullah Cheema	22,323	15.26	
Turnout		150,043	49.13	
Total valid votes		145,378	96.89	
Rejected ballots		4,665	3.11	
Majority		46,783	32.28	
Registered electors		305,379		

== Election 2008 ==
General elections were held on 18 February 2008. Chaudhry Anwar Ali Cheema of PML-Q won by 83,594 votes.

General election 2008: NA-67 Sargodha-IV
Party	Candidate	Votes	%	±%
PML(Q)	Ch. Anwar Ali Cheema	83,594	48.89	
PPP	Zulfiqar Ali Bhatti	66,392	38.83	
PML(N)	Ch. Muhammad Ali Gujar	20,225	11.83	
Others	Others (three candidates)	770	0.45	
Turnout		174,577	46.89	
Total valid votes		170,891	97.89	
Rejected ballots		3,496	2.11	
Majority		17,202	10.06	
Registered electors		372,351		
PML(Q) hold				

== Election 2013 ==
General elections were held on 11 May 2013. Zulfiqar Ali Bhatti succeeded in the election with 109,132 votes and became a member of the National Assembly.

General election 2013: NA-67 Sargodha-IV
Party	Candidate	Votes	%	±%
PML(N)	Zulfiqar Ali Bhatti	109,132	48.97	
PML(Q)	Ch. Anwar Ali Cheema	97,361	43.69	
Others	Others (ten candidates)	16,347	7.34	
Turnout		231,001	63.18	
Total valid votes		222,840	96.47	
Rejected ballots		8,161	3.53	
Majority		11,771	5.28	
Registered electors		365,609		
PML(N) gain from PML(Q)				

== Election 2018 ==
General elections were held on 25 July 2018.

General election 2018: NA-91 Sargodha-IV
Party	Candidate	Votes	%	±%
PML(N)	Zulfiqar Ali Bhatti	110,525	40.59	
PTI	Chaudhry Aamir Sultan Cheema	110,246	40.49	
Others	Others (eleven candidates)	44,789	16.45	
Turnout		272,293	59.46	
Rejected ballots		6,733	2.47	
Majority		279	0.10	
Registered electors		457,921		
PML(N) hold		Swing	N/A	

=== Repolling, February 2019 ===
Following uncovering of evidence of ballot-tempering in an election tribunal, the Election Commission of Pakistan (ECP) ordered a repolling on 20 contentious polling stations at the request of Aamir Sultan Cheema. The repolling was conducted on February 2, 2019, the result of which PTI's Cheema emerged victorious.

Re-polling on 20 Polling Stations: NA-91 Sargodha-IV
Party	Candidate	Votes	%	±%
PTI	Chaudhry Aamir Sultan Cheema	12,028	79.59	▲39.10
PML(N)	Zulfiqar Ali Bhatti	3,034	20.41	▼20.18
Majority		8,894	58.85	▲58.75
PTI gain from PML(N)				

=== Challenge in the Supreme Court ===
Bhatti successfully challenged the ECP’s re-polling order in the Supreme Court and he was again declared the winner of this election.

== Election 2024 ==
General elections were held on 8 February 2024. Zulfiqar Ali Bhatti won the election with 121,015 votes.

General election 2024: NA-85 Sargodha-IV
Party	Candidate	Votes	%	±%
PML(N)	Zulfiqar Ali Bhatti	121,015	44.63	▲4.04
PTI	Khuda Dad (Note: Filed nomination papers as PTI candidate but ECP allowed him to run as an Independent)	111,165	41.00	▲0.51
PPP	Tariq Mahmood	9,127	3.37	▲0.35
Independent	Majid Ali	5,698	2.10	N/A
Others	Others (sixteen candidates)	24,151	8.90	
Turnout		277,775	54.76	▼4.70
Total valid votes		271,156	97.62	
Rejected ballots		6,619	2.38	
Majority		9,850	3.63	▲3.53
Registered electors		507,216		
PML(N) hold		Swing	N/A	

== See also ==
- NA-84 Sargodha-III
- NA-86 Sargodha-V
