= Noon (disambiguation) =

Noon is the time 12 o'clock midday.

Noon may refer to:

== People ==
- Noon (surname)
- Noon (musician) (b. 1979), pseudonym of Polish electronic musician and producer Mikołaj Bugajak
- Serer-Noon, an ethnic group of western Senegal

== Arts, entertainment, and media ==
- Noon (film), 1968 Yugoslav film directed by Mladomir Puriša Đorđević
- Noon (magazine), an annual literary magazine
- Noon (play), a one-act play by Terrence McNally
- Symphony No. 7 (Haydn) by Haydn, nicknamed "Le midi", meaning "The Noon"

== Other uses ==
- Noon, Washington, an unincorporated community in Whatcom County, Washington, United States
- Noon language, language spoken by the Serer-Noon people of Senegal
- NOON state, an entangled quantum mechanical state
- Nun (letter) (or Noon) is the fourteenth letter of many Semitic scripts.

== See also ==
- High Noon (disambiguation)
- Noonday (disambiguation)
- Noone
