= Amjad Ali Noon =

Malik Amjad Ali Noon (born 17 June 1954, Lahore) is a Pakistani politician.

== Family ==
His father Malik Anwer Ali Noon (1924 – 12 September 2014) mostly lived in their hometown village Ali Pur Noon during his lifetime. The Noon family has 27 villages in Bhalwal Tehsil: Nurpur Noon, Sultan Pur Noon and Sardar Pur Noon, among others. Malik Feroz Khan Noon ex-Prime Minister of Pakistan was also a prominent member of the Noon family.

== Education ==
Amjad Ali Noon got his early education from the prestigious Aitchison College and his bachelor's degree from the Forman Christian College, Lahore. He has studied Law and has attended in his capacity as a member of the District Government, the National Institute of Public Administration (Pakistan) (NIPA), Lahore, and the National Defence University, Pakistan in Islamabad.

== Political career ==
At the age of 34, Noon was the youngest High Commissioner of Pakistan to Kenya. He was also Ambassador Extraordinary and Plenipotentiary of Pakistan to Rwanda, Ethiopia and Uganda under the Pakistan Peoples Party (PPP) government of Benazir Bhutto (1989–90).

Amjad Ali Noon served as the Zila Nazim Sargodha (District Governor) in 2002. At the launching ceremony of the Sargodha Transport Network, he stated that the district government had fulfilled a promise of providing cheap transport facility to the public.

His political affiliations have been with the Pakistan Peoples Party. In 2010, he also served as Chairman of the Prime Minister's Inspection Commission of Pakistan.

In 2011 and 2012, Amjad Ali Noon served as president of the Punjab Squash Association, a sports organisation.
