= Tanzila Aamir Cheema =

Pakistani politician

Member of the National Assembly of Pakistan
- In office 23 June 2011 – 16 March 2013
- Constituency: Reserved seat for women
- In office 18 November 2002 – 18 November 2007
- Constituency: Reserved seat for women

Personal details
- Party: IPP (2025-present)
- Other political affiliations: PTI (2018-2023); PML(Q) (2002-2018)
- Spouse: Chaudhry Aamir Sultan Cheema
- Children: Muhammad Muneeb Sultan Cheema

Tanzila Aamir Cheema (Urdu: تنزیلہ عامر چیمہ) is a Pakistani politician who served as member of the National Assembly of Pakistan.

== Political career ==
She was elected to the National Assembly of Pakistan as a candidate of Pakistan Muslim League (Q) on a seat reserved for women from Punjab in the 2002 Pakistani general election.

She was re-elected to the National Assembly of Pakistan as a candidate of Pakistan Muslim League (Q) on a seat reserved for women from Punjab in 2011.
