= PP-249 Bahawalpur-V =

Constituency of the Punjabi Provincial Legislature, Pakistan

- Constituency for the Provincial Assembly of Punjab
- Region: Ahmedpur Sharqia Tehsil including Ahmedpur Sharqia town of Bahawalpur District

Current constituency
- Created from: PP-268 Bahawalpur-II (2002-2018); PP-253 Bahawalpur-IX (2018-2023)

PP-249 Bahawalpur-V (پی پی-249، بہاولپور-5) is a Constituency of Provincial Assembly of Punjab.

== General elections 2024 ==
Provincial election 2024: PP-249 Bahawalpur-V
Party	Candidate	Votes	%	±%
Independent	Sahibzada Gazain Abbasi	42,503	38.88	
PML(N)	Adnan Farid	35,142	32.15	
PPP	Rafat Ur Rehman Rehmani	15,301	14.00	
Independent	Jawad Hafeez (Note: Filed nomination papers as PTI candidate but ECP allowed him to run as an Independent)	8,026	7.34	
TLP	Hafiz Muhammad Ashiq Fareed	4,140	3.79	
Others	Others (nine candidates)	4,202	3.84	
Turnout		112,860	49.86	
Total valid votes		109,314	96.86	
Rejected ballots		3,546	3.14	
Majority		7,361	6.73	
Registered electors		226,355		
hold				

== General elections 2018 ==
Provincial election 2018: PP-253 Bahawalpur-IX
Party	Candidate	Votes	%	±%
PTI	Sahibzada Muhammad Gazain Abbasi	36,420	40.38	
PML(N)	Adnan Fareed	31,364	34.77	
PPP	Syed Muhammad Raza Diwan	10,808	11.98	
TLP	Muhammad Mohsin Yaseeni	6,812	7.55	
GDA	Hussain Ali Durani	2,827	3.13	
Others	Others (six candidates)	1,966	2.19	
Turnout		93,263	51.72	
Total valid votes		90,197	96.71	
Rejected ballots		3,066	3.29	
Majority		5,056	5.61	
Registered electors		180,319		

== General elections 2013 ==
Provincial election 2013: PP-268 Bahawalpur-II
Party	Candidate	Votes	%	±%
PML(N)	Qazi Adnan Fareed	36,873	48.29	
Independent	Sahibzada Muhammad Omar Abbasi	19,394	25.40	
Independent	Rais Abdul Waheed Perhaar	5,802	7.60	
Bahawalpur National Awami Party	Sahibzada Faiz Ur Rasheed Abbasi	5,296	6.94	
PTI	Abdul Basit Khan	3,601	4.72	
PPP	Muhammad Ali	3,224	4.22	
Others	Others (thirteen candidates)	2,165	2.84	
Turnout		79,169	55.05	
Total valid votes		76,355	96.45	
Rejected ballots		2,814	3.55	
Majority		17,479	22.89	
Registered electors		143,804		

== General elections 2008 ==
Contesting candidates	Party affiliation	Votes polled

== See also ==
- PP-248 Bahawalpur-IV
- PP-250 Bahawalpur-VI
