= Sajjan Singh Cheema =

Indian basketball player (born 1957)

Personal information
- Born: 15 January 1957 (age 69) Dabulian, Kapurthala

Career information
- Playing career: 1976–1994

Career highlights
- Arjuna award (1999)

Sajjan Singh Cheema (born 15 January 1957) is an Indian former basketball player. He represented India in 1982 Asian Games and other international tournaments and matches including Asian Basketball Championship in 1981, 1983 and 1985. He was honoured in 1999 with Arjuna Award, the second-highest sporting honour of India, and in 1983 with Maharaja Ranjit Singh Award given by the Punjab state government.

== Early life ==
Sajjan Singh was born in 1957 in Dabulian village in Kapurthala district in Punjab state. He studied at Kamalia Khalsa High School Kapurthala and at Sport College Jalandhar.

== Career ==
He started playing basketball in 1976 and first participated in Inter university tournament held in Jaipur in 1976. He first played national from Andhra Pradesh and later went on to represent Punjab for more than a decade. He played for India in the FIBA Asia Basketball Championship teams in 1981, 1983, and 1985, and represented the country in the Asian Games in 1982.He retired from playing in 1994. He served as SP with Punjab police, and additionally the Deputy Commissioner of Police (Traffic) Ludhiana.

== Political career ==
He joined the Aam Aadmi Party (AAP) in April 2016. The main motive to join AAP was to improve India's Education and Sports and also to make India a drug free country.

== Personal life ==
His brothers Balkar Singh and Gurmeet Singh and cousin Kuldeep Singh Cheema also played basketball and represented India. Guneet Kaur the daughter of Sajjan Singh has played in the under-17 category at the national level. His nephew Amritpal Singh Cheema is an international kabaddi player known as Shurli Khiranwalia

Being appointed as the Candidate for Aam Aadmi Party from Sultanpur Lodhi Constituency for the Punjab elections of 2017.
