= Tahia Noon =

Pakistani politician

Member of the Provincial Assembly of the Punjab
- In office 29 May 2013 – 31 May 2018
- Constituency: Reserved seat for women

Personal details
- Born: 20 May 1973 (age 53) Karachi, Sindh, Pakistan
- Party: PMLN (2013-present)
- Spouse: Malik Adnan Hayat Noon

Tahia Noon (Urdu: طحٰیہ نون) is a Pakistani politician who was a Member of the Provincial Assembly of the Punjab, from May 2013 to May 2018.

== Early life and education ==
She was born on 20 May 1973 in Karachi.

She earned the degree of Bachelor of Arts (Hons) in 1996 and received the degree of Master of Arts in Mental & Moral Sciences from Trinity College, Dublin.

== Political career ==
She was elected to the Provincial Assembly of the Punjab as a candidate of Pakistan Muslim League (N) (PML-N) on a reserved seat for women in the 2013 Pakistani general election.

She was re-elected to the Provincial Assembly of the Punjab as a candidate of PML-N on a reserved seat for women in the 2018 Pakistani general election.
