= Balli Singh Cheema =

Indian politician

- Born: 2 September 1952 (age 73); Amritsar, Punjab, India
- Citizenship: Indian
- Occupations: Poet, Politician
- Writing career
- Subject: Hindi
- Notable awards: Ganga Sharan Singh Award

Balli Singh Cheema (born 2 September 1952) is a famous Hindi poet and currently politician of Aam Aadmi Party, contesting 2014 Indian general election from Nainital Constituency.

== Award ==
- Cheema has received Ganga Sharan Singh Award from president Pratibha Patil.
- Shiromani Hindi Sahitkar from Government of Punjab, India
