= Muhammad Ajmal Asif =

Pakistani politician

Member of the Provincial Assembly of the Punjab
- In office 15 August 2018 – 14 January 2023
- Constituency: PP-108 Faisalabad-XII
- In office 31 May 2013 – 31 May 2018
- Constituency: PP-63 Faisalabad-XII
- In office 13 February 2008 – 13 February 2013
- Constituency: PP-63 Faisalabad-XII

Personal details
- Born: 25 March 1976 (age 50) Faisalabad, Punjab, Pakistan
- Party: PMLN

Muhammad Ajmal Asif (born 25 March 1976) is a Pakistani politician who was a member of the Provincial Assembly of the Punjab, from February 2008 to February 2013; then from May 2013 to May 2018 and afterwards from July 2018 till January 2023 (for 3 consecutive terms; each term comprising 5 years).

== Early life ==
He was born on March 25, 1976.

He obtained a fake degree of Shahadat-e-Almia from Darul-Aloom Mehmoodia, Bannu, which was equivalent to an MA.

== Political career ==
He was elected to the Provincial Assembly of the Punjab as a candidate of Pakistan Muslim League (Q) from Constituency PP-63 (Faisalabad-XIII) in the 2008 Pakistani general election. He received 29,413 votes and defeated Rana Aftab Ahmad Khan; a Pakistan People's Party candidate with a heavy margin of 12,566 votes.

In 2010, he resigned as a member of the Punjab Assembly after being accused of possessing a fake degree. He later ran for the seat again in by-elections as a candidate of the PML-N held in May 2010, and he successfully reclaimed the seat by defeating Rana Aftab Ahmad Khan; a candidate of the Pakistan People's Party.

He was re-elected to the Provincial Assembly of the Punjab as a candidate of Pakistan Muslim League (N) (PML-N) from Constituency PP-63 (Faisalabad-XIII) in the 2013 Pakistani general election. He received 35,211 votes and defeated Rana Khan Shabbir Hussain Khan; Pakistan People's Party candidate with a heavy margin of 10,311 votes.

He was re-elected to the Provincial Assembly of the Punjab as a candidate of PML-N from Constituency PP-108 (Faisalabad-XII) in the 2018 Pakistani general election. He received 41,516 votes and defeated Rana Aftab Ahmad Khan; a candidate of Pakistan Tehreek-e-Insaf for the third time consecutively.
