= Alipur Noon =

Village in Sargodha District, Punjab, Pakistan

Alipur Noon علی پور نون
- Village
- Location in Pakistan
- Coordinates: 32°18′30″N 72°58′39″E
- Country: Pakistan
- Province: Punjab
- District: Sargodha
- Named for: Noon family and clan

Population (2017 Pakistani census)
  - Total: 10,761

Alipur Noon or Ali Pur is a village near Bhera in Sargodha District, Punjab, Pakistan.

== People ==
Alipur Noon is inhabited by 10,761 people with 1811 households as per the 2017 Pakistani census. It is one of the largest villages in the area and is a self-sustained community, having schools, medical clinics, ironmongers, carpenters, and traditional craftsmen in leather arts, clay arts, etc.

Malik Anwar Ali Noon (1924 – 12 September 2014) was a prominent politician from Alipur Noon village. Currently his son Amjad Ali Noon is active in politics from the same village.

== Environment ==
The village is surrounded by citrus, kinno, malta (a variety of orange), lychee, and guava. The date and mango orchards are over a hundred years old. It also has a very successful stud farm.
