= Sardar Atif Hussain Khan Mazari =

Pakistani politician (1972–2020)

Member of the Provincial Assembly of the Punjab
- In office 1 June 2013 – 31 May 2018
- Constituency: PP-250 (Rajanpur-IV)
- In office 2 February 2009 – 20 March 2013
- Constituency: PP-250 (Rajanpur-IV)

Personal details
- Born: 18 February 1972 Rojhan Mazari, Rajanpur District
- Died: 27 May 2020 (aged 48)
- Party: Pakistan Muslim League (N)

Sardar Atif Hussain Khan Mazari (18 February 1972 – 27 May 2020) was a Pakistani politician who was a Member of the Provincial Assembly of the Punjab, from February 2009 to March 2013 and from June 2013 to May 2018.

== Early life and education ==
He was born on 18 February 1972 in Rojhan. He had matriculation level education.

== Political career ==
Mazari was elected to the Provincial Assembly of the Punjab as a candidate for the Pakistan Muslim League (N) (PML-N) from Constituency PP-250 (Rajanpur-IV) in by-polls held in January 2009. He received 31,209 votes and defeated an independent candidate, Zahid Khan Mazari.

He was re-elected to the Provincial Assembly of the Punjab as a PML-N candidate from Constituency PP-250 (Rajanpur-IV) in the 2013 Pakistani general election.

In December 2013, he was appointed Parliamentary Secretary for literacy and non-formal basic education.

== Death ==
He died on 27 May 2020.

== Family ==
Atif Mazari was the nephew of Balkh Sher Mazari. Balakh Sher Mazari's sons are Sardar Riaz Mehmood Khan Mazari Ex MNA and Zahid Mazari Ex MPA/Minister. Another son is Major Tariq Mazari whose son is Dost Muhammad Mazari. Atif Mazari contested election against Zahid Mazari in past.

Farhat Aziz Mazari Ex MPA was also relative. Ex Deputy Speaker Shaukat Hussein Mazari was also relative.

Atif Mazari was son of Liaqat Mazari. His brother Shamsher Ali Mazari is elected as MNA in 2024 and he defeated Riaz Hussain Mazari. Atif's son Basit Mazari killed him. Rehman Mazari is also his son.

Basit Mazari's brother in law Khizer Hussain Mazari is elected as MPA 2024. Shamsher Mazari defeated Riaz Mazari and Khizer Mazari defeated Dost Muhammad Mazari in 2024.
