= High Noon (disambiguation) =

High Noon is a 1952 western film directed by Fred Zinnemann.

High Noon may also refer to:

- High noon, a synonym for solar noon
- High Noon (seltzer), an American hard seltzer brand

== Arts and entertainment ==
- High Noon, Part II: The Return of Will Kane, a 1980 TV film sequel to High Noon
- High Noon (2000 film), an American television film remake of the 1952 film
- High Noon (2009 film), directed by Peter Markle
- High Noon (2013 film), directed by Ivan Mazza
- High Noon (painting), a 1949 painting by Edward Hopper
- High Noon (video game), or Highnoon, a 1984 game for the Commodore 64
- Chikara High Noon, a 2011 professional wrestling pay-per-view event produced by Chikara
- Highnoon, a 1970 text-based computer game

=== Music ===
- High Noon (Mark Heard album), 1993
- High Noon (Arkells album), 2014
- High Noon (Jerrod Niemann album), 2014
- "High Noon", a song by Haircut 100 from their 1984 album Paint and Paint
- "High Noon", a 1993 song by Kruder & Dorfmeister
- "High Noon", a 1997 single by DJ Shadow
- "High Noon", a song by Rascalz from their 1999 album Global Warning
- "High Noon", a song by Testament from their 2025 album Para Bellum

=== Television episodes ===
- "High Noon", Black Harbour season 2, episode 8 (1997)
- "High Noon", Bottle Boys series 2, episode 5 (1985)
- "High Noon", Casualty series 1, episode 6 (1986)
- "High Noon", Dinosaurs season 1, episode 4 (1991)
- "High Noon", Gadget & the Gadgetinis episode 14 (2003)
- "High Noon", Gargoyles season 2, episode 13 (1995)
- "High Noon", Home to Roost series 4, episode 6 (1990)
- "High Noon", Hooperman season 1, episode 15 (1988)
- "High Noon", Ink episode 4 (1996)
- "High Noon", Karen's Song episode 4 (1987)
- "High Noon", Lapitch the Little Shoemaker episode 25 (2003)
- "High Noon", Longmire season 4, episode 3 (2015)
- "High Noon", Martin season 3, episode 20 (1995)
- "High Noon", M.A.S.K. season 2, episode 8 (1986)
- "High Noon", Nurse Jackie season 7, episode 6 (2015)
- "High Noon", On the Rocks (American) episode 20 (1976)
- "High Noon", Power Play (1998) season 1, episode 11 (1999)
- "High Noon", Renford Rejects series 1, episode 13 (1998)
- "High Noon", Report to Murphy episode 4 (1982)
- "High Noon", Seven Little Monsters season 3, episode 5a (2003)
- "High Noon", Suits (American) season 2, episode 10 (2012)
- "High Noon", Teen Mom: Young and Pregnant season 3, episode 2 (2021)
- "High Noon", The Brittas Empire series 4, episode 8 (1994)
- "High Noon", The Redd Foxx Show episode 13 (1986)

== See also ==
- "The Ballad of High Noon", the title theme from the 1952 film
