= Noonday =

Noonday may refer to:

== Places ==
- Noonday, Georgia
- Noonday Creek, Georgia
- Noonday, Texas

== People ==
- Noahquageshik, a 19th Century Native American leader often referred to as Chief Noonday

== Media ==
- Noonday (novel), by Pat Barker, published in 2015
- Noonday Paperbacks, a former imprint of Farrar, Straus and Giroux
- Noonday, a magazine in book form, three annual issues published, 1958-1960, edited by Cecil Hemley, and in its latter two issues, also by Dwight W. Webb. Published many notable writers, including the first English translation of The Last Summer by Boris Pasternak in the first issue.

== See also ==
- Noon (disambiguation)
