= Babar Ali (disambiguation) =

Babar Ali may refer to:

== People ==
- Babar Ali, film and television actor
- Babar Ali, cricketer from Pakistan
- Babar Ali, teacher from India
- Babar Ali Khan, Nawab of Bengal, Bihar, and Orissa
- Babar Ali Khan, boxer from Pakistan
- Babar Ali Khan Mohmand, politician from Pakistan
- Syed Babar Ali, former finance minister of Pakistan
