= Ejaz Hussain Bukhari =

Pakistani politician

Syed Ejaz Hussain Bukhari

Member of the Provincial Assembly of the Punjab
- Incumbent
- Assumed office 24 February 2024
- Constituency: PP-3 Attock-III
- In office 29 May 2013 – 31 May 2018
- Constituency: PP-15 Attock-I
- In office 25 November 2002 – 17 November 2007
- Constituency: PP-15 Attock-I

Personal details
- Born: 5 March 1941 (age 85) Attock, Punjab, British India
- Party: PTI (2013-present)
- Other political affiliations: PML(Q) (2008-2013); MNA (2002-2007)
- Relations: Syed Yawer Abbas Bukhari (nephew) Zulfi Bukhari (nephew)

Syed Ejaz Hussain Bukhari is a Pakistani politician who is a Member of the Provincial Assembly of the Punjab since 23 February 2024. He served as an assembly member prior to this from 2002 to 2007 and again from May 2013 to May 2018.

== Early life and education ==
He was born on 5 March 1941 in Attock. He has a degree of Master of Arts which he obtained in 1966 and a degree of Bachelor of Law which he received in 1967 from University of Karachi.

== Political career ==
He was elected to the Provincial Assembly of the Punjab as a candidate of Muttahida Majlis-e-Amal from Constituency PP-15 (Attock-I) in the 2002 Pakistani general election. He received 23,775 votes and defeated a candidate of Pakistan Muslim League (Q) (PML-Q).

He ran for the seat of the Provincial Assembly of the Punjab as a candidate of PML-Q from Constituency PP-15 (Attock-I) in the 2008 Pakistani general election but was unsuccessful. He received 24,808 votes and lost the seat to a candidate of Pakistan Peoples Party.

He was re-elected to the Provincial Assembly of the Punjab as a candidate of Pakistan Tehreek-e-Insaf from Constituency PP-15 (Attock-I) in the 2013 Pakistani general election. He was re-elected from the provincial assembly seat PP-3 Attock-III in the 2024 Pakistani general election.
