= Sultan Ahmed Cheema =

Pakistani surgeon

Dr Sultan Ahmed Cheema (1908–1990) was among the few doctors living in Pakistan after its creation in 1947. He served at various divisional and district hospitals simultaneously because of the acute shortage of doctors at that time. During the latter part of his career, he established the Cheema Hospital in Daska which became very famous in the field of ophthalmology.

Patients came from Kabul to Karachi for treatment. For his services, he was decorated with the civil medal of Sitara-i-Khidmat by the President of Pakistan. Cheema was also the President of the Ophthalmological Society of Pakistan.

Cheema was also a Member of the National Assembly of Pakistan.
