= Mohammad Ali Khan Mohmand =

Pakistani politician

Mohammad Ali Khan Mohmand (19 January 1958 – 2 November 2012) was a Pakistani politician. He was a member of the Provincial Assembly of Khyber Pakhtunkhwa elected from Shabqadar, and also remained as the first Chairman of district council Charsadda. He suffered grave injuries in a suicide blast on 3 March 2012 and after eight months of protracted illness, he died on 2 November 2012.

He is the elder son of Tribal Elder of Mohmand Agency Federally Administered Tribal Areas; former MPA and Senator Haji Dilawar Khan Mohmand and son-in-law of a retired Commissioner Haji Hidayatullah Khan Mohmand. One of his brothers, Qurban Ali Khan is a Customs officer.

In by-elections his elder son Babar Ali Khan Mohmand was elected MPA.
