= Ibrar Hussain =

Pakistani politician

MPA Ibrar Hussain

Member of the Provincial Assembly of Khyber Pakhtunkhwa
- In office 31 May 2013 – 28 May 2018
- Constituency: PK-57 (Mansehra-V)

Personal details
- Party: Qaumi Watan Party
- Occupation: Politician

Ibrar Hussain (Urdu: ابرار حسین) is a Pakistani politician from Mansehra District. He served as a member of the Khyber Pakhtunkhwa Assembly belonging to the Qaumi Watan Party.
