= Malik Muhammad Ali Khokhar =

Pakistani politician

Member of the Provincial Assembly of the Punjab
- In office 29 May 2013 – 31 May 2018

Personal details
- Born: 6 January 1971 (age 55) Multan
- Party: Pakistan Muslim League Nawaz (PML n)

Malik Muhammad Ali Khokhar is a Pakistani politician who was a Member of the Provincial Assembly of the Punjab, from May 2013 to May 2018.

== Early life and education ==
He was born on 6 January 1971 in Multan.

He received his early education from Aitchison College. He graduated from Government College, Lahore and has the degree of Bachelor of Arts. He received the degree of Bachelor of Laws (Hons) from University of Buckingham in 1996.

== Political career ==
He ran for the seat of the Provincial Assembly of the Punjab as a candidate of Pakistan Muslim League (N) (PML-N) from Constituency PP-199 (Multan-VI) in the 2008 Pakistani general election but was unsuccessful. He received 14,610 votes and lost the seat to Syed Nazim Hussain Shah, a candidate of Pakistan Peoples Party (PPP).

He was elected to the Provincial Assembly of the Punjab as a candidate of PML-N from Constituency PP-199 (Multan-VI) in the 2013 Pakistani general election. He received 35,817 votes and defeated Tahir Ahmed Asghar Khokhar, a candidate of Pakistan Tehreek-e-Insaf (PTI).
