= Ajiaz Hussain Shah Bukhari =

Pakistani politician

Member of the Provincial Assembly of Sindh
- In office 29 May 2013 – 28 May 2018

Personal details
- Party: Pakistan Peoples Party

Ajiaz Hussain Shah Bukhari is a Pakistani politician who had been a Member of the Provincial Assembly of Sindh, from May 2013 to May 2018.

== Political career ==
He was elected to the Provincial Assembly of Sindh as a candidate of Pakistan Peoples Party from Constituency PS-53 Tando Muhammad Khan-cum-Hyderabad in the 2013 Pakistani general election.
