= Sardar Pur Noon =

Pakistani town

Sardar Pur Noon سردار پور نون
- Town
- Location in Pakistan
- Coordinates: 32°11′18″N 73°01′43″E
- Country: Pakistan
- Province: Punjab
- District: Sargodha

Population (2017 Census of Pakistan)
  - Total: 357,331 (population of Bhalwal Tehsil including Sardar Pur Noon town)

Sardar Pur Noon is a town in Bhalwal Tehsil, Sargodha District, Punjab, Pakistan.

== Notable people ==
- Mukhtar Ahmad Bharath, politician, Member of Provincial Assembly of Punjab (2002 - 2007) from Bhalwal Tehsil
