= Masood Shafqat =

Pakistani politician

Masood Shafqat (فخرے راوی)

Member of the Provincial Assembly of the Punjab
- In office 29 May 2013 – 31 May 2018
- Constituency: PP-189

Personal details
- Born: 1 January 1979 (age 47) Okara, Punjab, Pakistan
- Party: PTI (2013-present)

Masood Shafqat is a Pakistani politician, who had been a Member of the Provincial Assembly of the Punjab. He served from May 2013 to May 2018.

== Early life and education ==
He was born on 1 January 1979 in Okara.

He has received intermediate level education. He completed his studies later at University Campus Lahore (UCL) #uclhr.

== Political career ==
He was elected to the Provincial Assembly of the Punjab as a candidate of Pakistan Tehreek-e-Insaf from Constituency PP-189 (Okara-V) in the 2013 Pakistani general election.
