= Zulfi Bukhari =

Pakistani businessman and politician

Sayed Zulfikar Abbas Bukhari
- سید ذوالفقار عباس بخاری

Special Assistant to Prime Minister for Overseas Pakistanis & Human Resource Development (Minister of State)
- In office 14 September 2018 – 10 April 2022
- President: Arif Alvi
- Prime Minister: Imran Khan
- Preceded by: Pir Sadaruddin Shah
- Succeeded by: Sajid Hussain Turi

Chairman of National Tourism Coordination Board
- In office 13 March 2019 – 10 April 2022
- President: Arif Alvi
- Prime Minister: Imran Khan

Chairman of Pakistan Tourism Development Corporation
- In office 14 May 2019 – 10 April 2022
- President: Arif Alvi
- Prime Minister: Imran Khan

Personal details
- Born: 3 December 1980 (age 45) England, United Kingdom
- Party: PTI (2011-present)
- Relatives: Ejaz Hussain Bukhari (uncle); Syed Yawer Abbas Bukhari (cousin)

Sayed Zulfikar Abbas Bukhari (born 3 December 1980), also known as Zulfi Bukhari, is a UK-based Pakistani politician, businessman and film producer.

He served as a Special Assistant to Prime Minister Imran Khan in the capacity of a Minister of State in the federal cabinet until his resignation on 17 May 2021 over the allegations levelled at him in regard to the Rawalpindi Ring Road scandal. The allegations were found to be politically motivated initiated by PTI insider to create distance between Zulfi Bukhari and PM Khan. The investigation team formally cleared him and PTI re-instated him on party positions.

On 3 September 2022, he renounced his British nationality.

== Early life and education ==
Zulfi Bukhari was born on 3 December 1980 in the United Kingdom and held British citizenship by birth. He spent his early years in the UK until the age of 13. Subsequently, his family relocated to Pakistan, where he continued his education in Islamabad from ages 13 to 18. After completing his secondary education, Bukhari returned to the UK to pursue higher studies at Brunel University London.

His family roots lie in Attock, Punjab, and his father Wajid Hussain Bukhari served as environment minister in Pervez Musharraf’s cabinet while his uncle Ejaz Hussain Bukhari is an important PTI politician in Attock.

== Business career ==
Prior to his political engagement, Zulfi Bukhari established himself as an entrepreneur in the United Kingdom, focusing on the hospitality and real estate sectors. He founded HPM Developments, a luxury real estate investment and development firm known for constructing high-end properties, including bespoke homes and boutique hotels. Additionally, Bukhari co-founded Martin Kemp Design, a leading interior design company specializing in luxury residential and commercial projects.

His entrepreneurial ventures also extended to the fitness industry, where he owned Hooks Gym, one of the largest mixed martial arts gyms globally, which was later sold to PureGym, becoming its flagship location.

== Political career ==
He has been an active member of Pakistan Tehreek-e-Insaf and a close aide to the Prime Minister of Pakistan Imran Khan since 2011. In 2018, Bukhari was head of Imran Khan's campaign in NA-53 (Islamabad-II). After the 2018 election victory, Imran Khan announced his cabinet. Bukhari was appointed as a Minister of State. He held the following offices:

1. Special Assistant to PM on Overseas Pakistanis and Human Resource Development
2. Chairman Pakistan Tourism Development Corporation
3. Chairman of National Tourism Coordination Board

Zulfi Bukhari holds the party position of 'Advisor to the Chairman on International Media'. He is also responsible for keeping Overseas Pakistanis engaged and represented.

== Other work ==
=== Film production ===
He has interests in film production. He was the executive producer of the 2018 movie Cake, selected as Pakistan’s entry for the Best Foreign Language Film at the 91st Academy Awards. Cake both challenged the Western perceptions of Pakistani film and stimulated the cultural economy whilst proudly showcasing Pakistani talent to an international audience.

== Controversies ==
=== Ring Road controversy, resignation and return to the party (2021) ===
Zulfi Bukhari resigned from his office as Special Assistant to the Prime Minister on OPHRD in a tweet on 17 May 2021. He quoted reasons as taking high moral approach as his name had been hinted at in a controversial report unveiled by the government of Pakistan. The allegation came on him for misuse of power owing to his relationship with Dr. Syed Tauqir Bukhari who had been named in the report. He denied any connection as his family is not even on talking terms with Dr Tauqir, he asked for his name to be placed on ECL if need arises. He also declared that he has no role in the alleged ring road scam. Later Federal Aviation Minister Ghulam Sarwar Khan announced on 18 June 2021 that his resignation had not been accepted by the Prime Minister. The allegations proved to be politically motivated initiated from inside the party. He was eventually cleared off by the investigation teams and given his political positions back, meanwhile, Imran Khan's party was voted out of power through No-confidence motion against Imran Khan.

== Media image ==
He was featured in May 2018 by The Muslim 100 Power List. He is the first Pakistani to appear on the cover of the Mayfair Times. The UK-based entertainment and lifestyle magazine Asian Style Magazine has described him as one of South Asia’s five best dressed men in 2020.
