= Rahat N. Babar =

American judge (born 1970)

Rahat N. Babar is an American lawyer and former judge of the Superior Court of New Jersey. Nominated by Governor Phil Murphy on February 28, 2022, and confirmed unanimously by the New Jersey Senate on May 26, 2022, Babar holds the historic distinction of being the first Bangladeshi American to serve on the New Jersey Superior Court.

== Early life and career ==
A resident of New Jersey, Babar was raised in Philadelphia, Pennsylvania. He attended West Catholic High School, earned his undergraduate degree from Drexel University, and earned his Juris Doctor degree from Delaware Law School, where he was an editor of the law review. During law school, he externed for Chief Justice Myron T. Steele of the Delaware Supreme Court. After law school, Babar clerked for Judge Renée Cohn Jubelirer of the Commonwealth Court of Pennsylvania.

Before his judicial appointment, Babar played a significant role in shaping legal strategy and policy within the New Jersey Governor’s Office. From 2019 to 2022, he served as Special Counsel to Governor Murphy, where he oversaw high-profile litigation impacting the Murphy Administration. His earlier public service includes serving as Special Assistant to Attorney General Christopher Porrino and as Director of Community Engagement under Attorney General Gurbir Grewal. Babar also taught law and public policy at Temple University Beasley School of Law as an adjunct professor.

Babar currently serves as Deputy Executive Director and General Counsel of the National Asian Pacific American Bar Association (NAPABA). In this dual role, Rahat leads NAPABA’s advocacy, civil rights, and policy priorities, and he serves as NAPABA’s chief legal officer overseeing the legal affairs of the organization.

Babar has long been active in the Asian American legal community. He served on the board of the Asian Pacific American Lawyers Association of New Jersey and served as President of the Asian Pacific American Bar Association of Pennsylvania in 2014, where he also served for many years on the Board of Directors. Nationally, he chaired the Civil Rights Committee of the National Asian Pacific American Bar Association (NAPABA). His commitment to advancing equity in the legal system is reflected in his service on the New Jersey Supreme Court Committee on Minority Concerns and the New Jersey Attorney General’s Diversity Council.

In 2023, Babar resigned from his judicial position in order to undertake a new job at the National Asian Pacific American Bar Association (NAPABA) where he was to be the organization’s deputy executive director for policy.
