= High Noon (video game) =

1984 video game

- Developer: Ocean Software
- Publisher: Ocean Software
- Platform: Commodore 64
- Release: 1984
- Genre: Shoot 'em up
- Mode: Single-player

High Noon (Highnoon on the title screen) is a western-themed shoot 'em up game written for the Commodore 64 and published by Ocean Software in 1984. Originally advertised on both the Commodore 64 and ZX Spectrum, the game itself was only ever released on the Commodore 64.

The game has five levels. The player takes the role of the good (white) sheriff in the American Old West. He must defend his town against outlaws looking to abduct women from the saloon and rob the bank, by shooting them. Shooting can be done in a horizontal, vertical or diagonal direction.

The background music is "Do Not Forsake Me: The Ballad of High Noon", from the movie High Noon, arranged for the game by David Dunn.

== Gameplay ==
Level 2

Bonus duel

With the sheriff dead, the outlaws run off with the goods.

Level 5

The game consists of five levels. In each level, the difficulty is increased:

- Level 2 introduces outlaws on horseback
- Level 3 introduces outlaws planting sticks of dynamite
- Level 4 features outlaws hiding behind windows

After each level there is a bonus duel, featuring the sheriff and an outlaw, requiring a fast reaction time from the player. In level 1 through 4, an undertaker from "Rig+ Mortis Undertakers" collects any bodies lying around during the game.

Level 5 takes place in a different setting. The stage is set in a field surrounding a central cave opening, from which outlaws may appear. After surviving level 5, the game returns to level 1.
