= Syed Yawer Abbas Bukhari =

Pakistani politician

Provincial Minister of Punjab for Baitul maal and Social Welfare
- In office 21 December 2020 – 16 April 2022

Member of the Provincial Assembly of the Punjab
- In office 15 August 2018 – 14 January 2023
- Constituency: PP-1 Attock-I

Personal details
- Party: PTI (2018-present)
- Relations: Ejaz Hussain Bukhari (uncle) Zulfi Bukhari (cousin) Shaandar Bukhari (cousin)

Syed Yawar Abbas Bukhari is a Pakistani politician who had been a member of the Provincial Assembly of the Punjab from August 2018 till January 2023 and Provincial Minister for Baitul maal and social welfare from December 2020 till April 2022. He has been an active member of PTI.

== Political career ==
He was elected to the Provincial Assembly of the Punjab as a candidate of Pakistan Tehreek-e-Insaf (PTI) from PP-1 Attock-I in the 2018 Punjab provincial election. He defeated Hameed Akbar, an independent candidate by receiving 39567 votes.

In December 2020, he was inducted into provincial cabinet of Punjab and appointed Provincial Minister of Punjab for Bait-ul-Maal and Social Welfare.

He ran for a seat in the Provincial Assembly from PP-3 Attock-III as a candidate of the PTI in the 2023 Punjab provincial election.
