= PP-3 Attock-III =

Constituency of the Punjabi Provincial Legislature, Pakistan

- Provincial constituency for the Provincial Assembly of Punjab
- Region: Attock Tehsil excluding Kamra Cantt of Attock District

Current constituency
- Created from: PP-15 Attock-I

PP-3 Attock-III (پی پی-3، اٹک-3) is a Constituency of Provincial Assembly of Punjab.

== General elections 2024 ==
Provincial election 2024: PP-3 Attock-III
Party	Candidate	Votes	%	±%
Independent	Syed Ijaz Hussain Bukhari (Note: Filed nomination papers as PTI candidate but ECP allowed him to run as an Independent)	36,999	31.80	
PML(N)	Hameed Akbar	32,043	27.54	
Independent	Rehmat Khan	14,473	12.44	
TLP	Umer Arshad	14,204	12.21	
Independent	Omair Ahmed	6,804	5.85	
PPP	Haider Ali	4,986	4.29	
JI	Muhammad Junaid	2,834	2.44	
Others	Others (nine candidates)	4,000	3.43	
Turnout		120,546	53.05	
Total valid votes		116,343	96.51	
Rejected ballots		4,203	3.49	
Majority		4,956	4.26	
Registered electors		227,213		
hold				

== General elections 2018 ==
In 2018 Pakistani general election, Syed Yawer Abbas Bukhari a ticket holder of PTI won PP-1 Attock-I election by taking 39,667 votes.

Provincial election 2018: PP-1 Attock-I
Party	Candidate	Votes	%	±%
PTI	Syed Yawer Abbas Bukhari	39,667	34.38	
Independent	Hameed Akbar	24,192	20.97	
PML(N)	Muhammad Salman Sarwar	24,036	20.84	
TLP	Umar Arshad	10,821	9.38	
Independent	Sardar Asim Nawaz Khan	5,680	4.92	
PPP	Irfan Jaffar	5,490	4.76	
MMA	Muhammad Iqbal	5,262	4.56	
Independent	Noman Khan	217	0.19	
Turnout		119,523	54.43	
Total valid votes		115,365	96.52	
Rejected ballots		4,158	3.48	
Majority		15,475	13.41	
Registered electors		219,588		

== General elections 2013 ==
Provincial election 2013: PP-15 Attock-I
Party	Candidate	Votes	%	±%
PTI	Ejaz Hussain Bukhari	28,437	25.99	
PML(N)	Muhammad Suleman Sarwar	24,055	21.98	
Independent	Sajid Mehmood	18,930	17.30	
Independent	Malik Hameed Akbar	17,382	15.89	
Independent	Shahid Mehmood Sheikh	7,722	7.06	
JI	Muhammad Iqbal	4,506	4.12	
PPP	Shahan Malik	2,734	2.42	
Others	Others (twelve candidates)	5,656	5.24	.
Turnout		112,997	56.16	
Total valid votes		109,422	96.84	
Rejected ballots		3,575	3.16	
Majority		4,382	4.01	
Registered electors		201,203		

== General elections 2008 ==
Provincial election 2008: PP-15 Attock-I
Party	Candidate	Votes	%	±%
PPP	Shaham Malik	30,875	40.53	
PML(Q)	Syed Ejaz Hussain Bukhari	24,808	32.57	
PML(N)	Muhammad Sulman Sarwar	20,493	26.90	
Turnout		79,152	51.72	
Total valid votes		76,176	96.24	
Rejected ballots		2,976	3.76	
Majority		6,067	7.96	
Registered electors		153,030		

== See also ==
- PP-4 Attock-IV
- PP-5 Attock-V
