= Sahibzada Usman Abbasi =

Pakistani politician

Member of the Provincial Assembly of the Punjab

Personal details
- Born: 28 May 1954 (age 71)
- Party: Pakistan Tahreek-e-Insaf
- Children: Sahibzada Gazain Abbasi (son)
- Parent: Sahibzada Muhammad Daud Khan Abbasi (father)

Sahibzada Muhammad Usman Abbasi is a Pakistani politician who is a former Deputy Speaker of the Provincial Assembly of the Punjab and member of the royal family of Bahawalpur State.
