= Sahibzada Gazain Abbasi =

Pakistani politician

Member of the Provincial Assembly of the Punjab
- In office 15 August 2018 – 14 January 2023
- Constituency: PP-253 Bahawalpur-IX

Personal details
- Party: IPP (2025-present)
- Other political affiliations: PMLN (2023-2025); PTI (2018-2023); IND (2008-2018)
- Parent: Sahibzada Usman Abbasi (father)

Sahibzada Muhammad Gazain Abbasi (born 21 February 1982) is a Pakistani politician who had been a member of the Provincial Assembly of the Punjab from August 2018 until January 2023.

== Political career ==
He was elected to the Provincial Assembly of the Punjab as an independent candidate from PP-268 (Bahawalpur-II) in the 2008 Pakistani general election. He received 24,822 votes and defeated an independent candidate, Rafat ur Rehman Rehmani. In the same election, he also ran for the seat of the National Assembly of Pakistan as an independent candidate from NA-184 (Bahawalpur-II) but was unsuccessful. He received 6,974 votes and lost the seat to an independent candidate, Malik Amir Yar Waran.

He was re-elected to the Provincial Assembly of the Punjab as a candidate of the Pakistan Tehreek-e-Insaf (PTI) from PP-253 (Bahawalpur-IX) in the 2018 Punjab provincial election.

He ran for a seat in the Provincial Assembly from PP-249 Bahawalpur-V as a candidate of the PTI in the 2023 Punjab provincial election.
