= Malik Ali Abbas Khokhar =

Pakistani politician

Member of the Provincial Assembly of the Punjab
- In office 15 August 2018 – 14 January 2023
- Constituency: PP-187 Okara-V
- In office 2008 – 31 May 2018

Personal details
- Born: 5 January 1972 (age 54) Okara, Punjab, Pakistan
- Party: PMLN (2008-present)
- Education: University of the Punjab

Punjab Assembly Lahore

Malik Ali Abbas Khokhar is a Pakistani politician who was a Member of the Provincial Assembly of the Punjab, from 2008 to May 2018 and from August 2018 to January 2023.

== Early life and education ==
He was born on 5 January 1972 in Okara.

He graduated from the University of the Punjab in 1994.

== Political career ==
He was elected to the Provincial Assembly of the Punjab as an independent candidate from Constituency PP-192 (Okara-VIII) in the 2008 Pakistani general election. He received 19,094 votes and defeated an independent candidate, Mian Sana Ullah Daula.

He was re-elected to the Provincial Assembly of the Punjab as a candidate of Pakistan Muslim League (N) (PML-N) from Constituency PP-192 (Okara-VIII) in the 2013 Pakistani general election. He received 42,073 votes and defeated Chaudhry Tariq Irshad Khan, a candidate of Pakistan Tehreek-e-Insaf (PTI).

He was re-elected to the Provincial Assembly of the Punjab as a candidate of PML-N from Constituency PP-187 (Okara-V) in the 2018 Pakistani general election.
