= Sultan Pur Noon =

Village in Bhalwal, Sargodha District, Punjab, Pakistan

- Village
- Location in Pakistan
- Coordinates: 32°11′18″N 73°01′43″E
- Country: Pakistan
- Province: Punjab
- District: Sargodha

Population (2017 Census of Pakistan)
  - Total: 13,413 (population of Bhalwal Porana including Sultan Pur Noon)

Sultan Pur Noon or simply Sultan Pur is a small town of Union Council 'Bhalwal Porana' situated in Bhalwal city, Sargodha District, in Punjab, Pakistan.
