= Rao Jamil Akhtar Khan =

Pakistani politician

Rao Jamil Akhtar
- Incumbent
- Assumed office 2005

Personal details
- Born: Okara

Rao Jamil Akhtar was elected as Okara Tehsil nazim in 2005 unopposed. He was member Provincial Assembly of the Punjab with Rao Sikandar Iqbal. He again contested in 2013 which he lost.
