= Chaudhry Imtiaz Ahmed Ranjha =

Pakistani politician

Chaudhry Imtiaz Ahmed Ranjha (Urdu: چوہدری امتیاز احمد رانجھا)

Personal details
- Born: Mandi Bahauddin, Punjab, Pakistan)
- Party: PTI (2018-present)
- Education: Harvard University (PhD)
- Profession: Politician

Chaudhry Imtiaz Ahmed Ranjha (Urdu: چوہدری امتیاز احمد رانجھا; born 1958) is a Pakistani politician.

He was born in Mandi Bahauddin in Punjab, the son of Chaudhry Sultan Ahmad. He received his Intermediate from Mandi Bahauddin. He is Senior Vice President of Pakistan Tehreek-e-Insaf. He is an agriculturist, and was as a member of District Council in 1983, 1991 and 1993. He was elected to the Provincial Assembly of the Punjab in 1997, and as a Member of the Provincial Assembly (MPA) of the Punjab from PP-101 in 1997 till 1999.

He has served as a Chairman Public Complaint Bureau with former Prime Minister Shaukat Aziz from 2004 to 2007. From May 2012 to March 2013 he has served as a Political Advisor to Prime Minister of Pakistan.

During his tenure as MPA, he has worked for education sector by promoting girls school and colleges in Mandi Bahuddin and provided all resources for the development of schools and colleges. He has also improved and developed the infrastructure of Mandi Bahaudin. He defeated Mushahid Raza in 2024 General Elections as a PTI backed independent candidate.
