= Shaukat Hussein Mazari =

Pakistani politician (1948–2008)

Sardar Shaukat Hussein Khan Mazari

Member of the Provincial Assembly of the Punjab
- In office 1 October 2002 – 30 September 2007
- Constituency: PP-250 (Rajanpur-IV)
- In office 2 February 1997 – 12 October 1999
- Constituency: PP-250 (Rajanpur-IV)

Personal details
- Born: 18 February 1948 Rojhan Mazari, Rajanpur District
- Died: 14 November 2008 (aged 60)
- Party: Pakistan Muslim League (N)

Shaukat Hussein Khan Mazari (1948–2008) was a prominent figure in the provincial politics of the Punjab, province of Pakistan. He died on 14 November 2008.

He was studied in Sadiq Public School Bahawal Pur. He went to England for Higher Education. He was known as Awam Dost leader. People loved him for his support and kind behaviour. He is the man who supported Dost Muhammad Mazari in his early stages of political journey. Dost Muhammad Mazari got elected MNA by his support.

He was elected as a Member of Provincial Assembly (MPA) from Rojhan-Mazari three times and has also served in the capacity of a provincial minister for a few days in 1977. Before his death, Mazari was serving as the Deputy Speaker of the Provincial Assembly of the Punjab.
