= Muhammad Muneeb Sultan Cheema =

Pakistani politician

Member of the Provincial Assembly of the Punjab
- In office 15 August 2018 – 14 January 2023
- Constituency: PP-75 Sargodha-IV

Personal details
- Born: 13 January 1992 (age 34)
- Party: PPP (2025-present)
- Other political affiliations: PTI (2018-2023)
- Parent(s): Chaudhry Aamir Sultan Cheema; Tan Ila Aamir Cheema

Muhammad Muneeb Sultan Cheema is a Pakistani politician who had been a member of the Provincial Assembly of the Punjab from August 2018 till January 2023. He was also the provincial Minister of Transport in the cabinet of Chief Minister Chaudhry Pervaiz Elahi.

== Political career ==
He was elected to the Provincial Assembly of the Punjab as a candidate of the Pakistan Tehreek-e-Insaf (PTI) from PP-75 (Sargodha-IV) in the 2018 Punjab provincial election.

He ran for a seat in the Provincial Assembly from PP-75 Sargodha-IV as a candidate of the PTI in the 2023 Punjab provincial election.
