= Anwar Ali Noon =

Politician from Punjab, Pakistan

Malik Anwar Ali Noon (1924 – 12 September 2014) son of Malik Sultan Ali Noon, was a politician and a large landowner of Sargodha, Pakistan. He was a member of the National Assembly of Pakistan in the government of Zulfikar Ali Bhutto.

== Early life and career ==
Anwar Ali Noon received his college education from Aitchison College, Lahore and then went on to graduate from the Government College, Lahore. He joined the British Indian Army in 1945 and served as an assistant to the British governor in Calcutta. In the Indo-Pakistan War of 1965, he did military duty at the Sargodha Airbase.

His village is Ali Pur Noon, situated in Bhera circle in Bhalwal Tehsil, Sargodha District. Anwar Ali Noon was elected a member of the National Assembly of Pakistan twice and was considered a friend of Zulfikar Ali Bhutto. He was also a founding member of the Pakistan Peoples Party. He retired from active politics in the late 1970s.

== Death and legacy ==
Anwar Ali Noon died on 12 September 2014 at age 90. He was survived by his widow Begum Parween Anwar Noon. His sons include Munawwar Ali Noon, Amjad Ali Noon and Asad Ali Noon. He also had 4 surviving daughters.

Anwar Ali Noon was also a cousin of the former Prime Minister of Pakistan in the 1950s, Feroz Khan Noon.
