= Amrik Singh Cheema =

Indian civil servant (1918–1982)

- Born: 1 December 1918; Badhai Cheema, Sialkot, British India
- Died: 18 July 1982 (aged 63); Tanzania
- Spouse: Raminder Kaur Gill
- Children: Jatinder Cheema; Jagdeep Cheema; Boona Cheema
- Awards: Padma Shri

Amrik Singh Cheema (1918–1982) was an Indian civil servant, author, an advocate of green revolution and a former vice chancellor of the Punjab Agricultural University, known for his contributions to the agricultural initiatives of the Indian government. He was honoured by the Government of India in 1969, with the award of Padma Shri, the fourth highest Indian civilian award for his contributions to the society.

The Young Farmers Association set up the annual Dr Amrik Singh Cheema award in his name, the former awardees of which include former Punjab Chief Minister CAPT AMRINDER SINGH, former Union Minister Ch BIRENDER SINGH and former Chief Election Commissioner of India MS Gill.

== Biography ==
Amrik Singh Cheema was born on 1 December 1918 at Badhai Cheema village in Sialkot district (presently in Pakistan) in the British India. He secured his master's degree in agriculture from Punjab University and a doctoral degree in Agriculture Extension from Cornell University, USA. Starting as an agricultural assistant, he pursued a notable career during which he served in various positions such as the Director of Agriculture, Faridkot State, the Joint Director of Agriculture of Patiala and East Punjab States Union (PEPSU), Director of Agriculture of Punjab, Central Agricultural Production Commissioner and Senior Agriculturist, International Bank for Reconstruction and Development (IBRD). He also served as the honorary Advisor on Agriculture to the Government of India and as the vice chancellor of Punjab Agricultural University, Ludhiana.

Cheema founded the Punjab Young Farmers' Association (PYFA) (1952), the Rural Youth Volunteers Corps, All India Chamber of Agriculture and the Punjab Chamber of Agriculture. His contributions were reported behind the establishment of the Young Farmers' Training Center, Rakhra, a centre for dissemination of scientific knowledge and technology, with assistance from the Food and Agriculture Organization.

Cheema was married to Raminder Kaur Gill and the couple had three children. The eldest, Jatinder Cheema, works for USAid while the son, Jagdeep Singh Cheema is the chairman of Dr. Amrik Singh Cheema Foundation Trust. The youngest, Boona Cheema is a social worker, community leader and a former director of Building Opportunities for Self-Sufficiency (BOSS), a self build organization.

Cheema was the author of four books, The Geeta and the Youth Today, Namyog, Spiritual Socialism and Role of cooperatives in package approach and case study on cooperatives in IADP District Ludhiana (Punjab). A winner of the Indian civilian award of Padma Shri in 1969, Cheema died in Tanzania on 18 July 1982, at the age of 64.

== See also ==
- Green revolution
