= Mian Manazir Hussain Ranjha =

Pakistani politician (born 1954)

Member of the Provincial Assembly of the Punjab
- In office 15 August 2018 – 14 January 2023
- Constituency: PP-74 Sargodha-III
- In office 29 May 2013 – 31 May 2018

Personal details
- Born: 15 August 1954 (age 72) Sargodha District
- Other political affiliations: Pakistan Muslim League (N)

Punjab Assembly Lahore

Mian Manazir Hussain Ranjha (born 15 August 1954) is a Pakistani politician who was a Member of the Provincial Assembly of the Punjab, between 1985 and May 2018 and from August 2018 to January 2023.

== Early life and education ==
He was born on 15 August 1954 in Sargodha District.

He has the degree of Bachelor of Arts and the degree of Bachelor of Laws which he obtained in 1977 from University of the Punjab.

== Political career ==
He was elected to the Provincial Assembly of the Punjab from Constituency PP-66 (Sargodha) in the 1985 Pakistani general election. During his tenure as member of the Provincial Assembly of the Punjab, he served as Deputy Speaker of the Punjab Assembly from 1985 to 1988.

He was re-elected to the Provincial Assembly of the Punjab as a candidate of Islami Jamhoori Ittehad (IJI) from Constituency PP-29 (Sargodha) in the 1990 Pakistani general election. During his tenure as member of the Provincial Assembly of the Punjab, he again served as Deputy Speaker of the Punjab Assembly from 1990 to 1993.

He was re-elected to the Provincial Assembly of the Punjab as a candidate of Pakistan Peoples Party (PPP) from Constituency PP-29 (Sargodha) in the 1993 Pakistani general election. He ran for the seat of Provincial Assembly of Punjab as a candidate of Pakistan Peoples Party (PPP) from Constituency PP-29 (Sargodha) in the 1997 Pakistani General election but was unsuccessful.

He was re-elected to the Provincial Assembly of the Punjab as a candidate of Pakistan Muslim League (Q) (PML-Q) from Constituency PP-31 (Sargodha-IV) in the 2002 Pakistani general election. He received 29,011 votes and defeated Tanveer Ahmed Midhana, a candidate of PPP.

He ran for the seat of the Provincial Assembly of the Punjab as a candidate of PML-Q from Constituency PP-31 (Sargodha-IV) in the 2008 Pakistani general election. He received 20,476 votes and lost the seat to Chaudhry Muhammad Awais Aslam Midhana, a candidate of PPP.

He was re-elected to the Provincial Assembly of the Punjab as a candidate of Pakistan Muslim League (N) (PML-N) from Constituency PP-31 (Sargodha-IV) in the 2013 Pakistani general election. He received 29,841 votes and defeated an independent candidate, Muhammad Aslam.

He was re-elected to Provincial Assembly of the Punjab as a candidate of PML-N from Constituency PP-74 (Sargodha-III) in the 2018 Pakistani general election.
