= Adnan Hayat Noon =

Pakistani politician

Malik Adnan Hayat Noon is a Pakistani former politician and businessman. His family formerly owned Noon Pakistan. He served as a member of the National Assembly of Pakistan from 1997 to 1999.

His wife Tahia Noon is also a politician.
