= Saifullah Cheema =

Member of the Pakistan Peoples Party

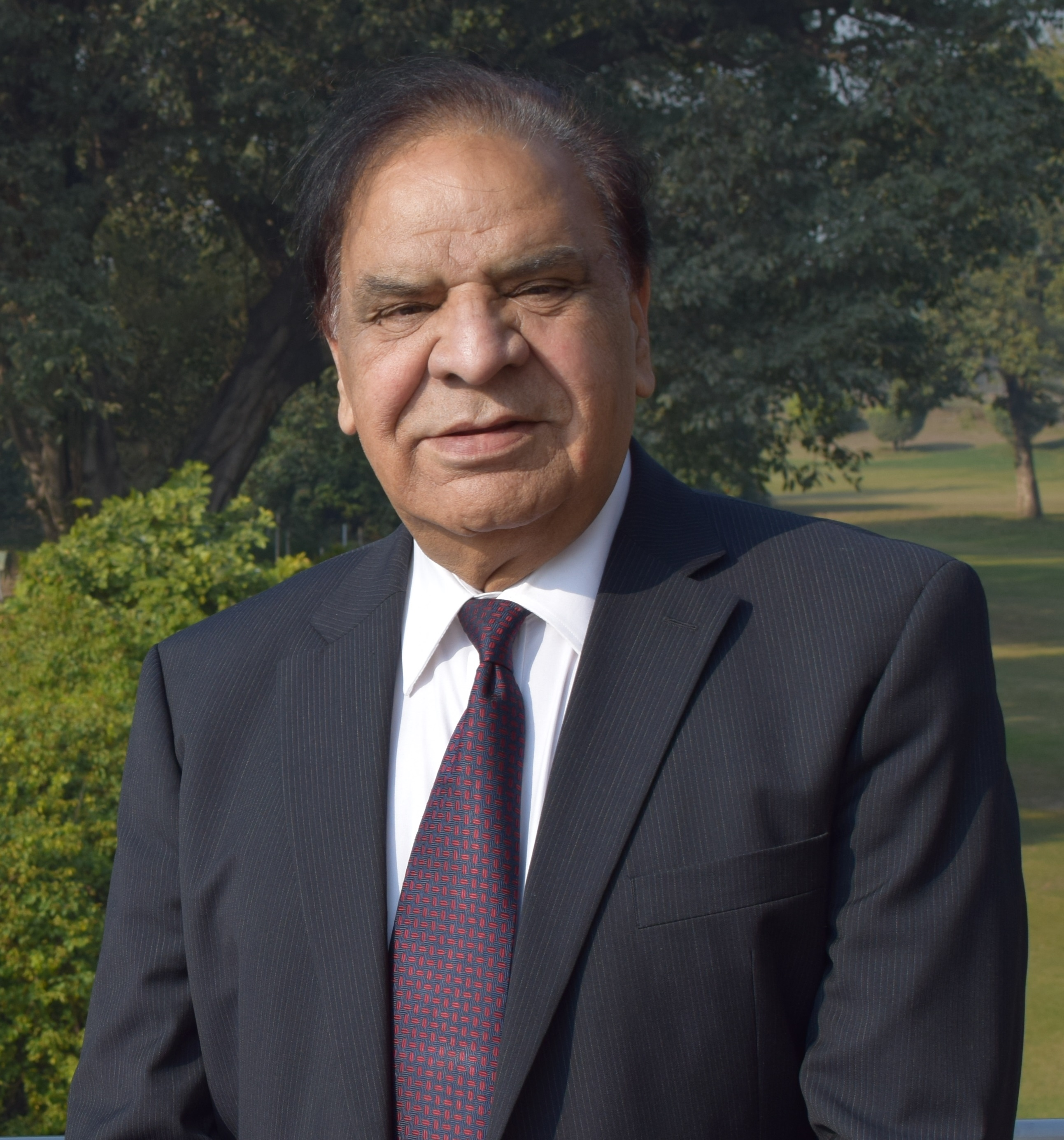

Saif Ullah Cheema is a retired army officer from Infantry from Pakistan Army. He was elected as a member of the Provincial Assembly of the Punjab from than PP-106 and now PP-131 in 1993 from the Pakistan Peoples Party. He served as a Special Advisor to the Chief Minister of the Punjab. He was once again the Pakistan Peoples Party candidate in the 2008 elections from PP-131.
