= Chaudhry Aamir Sultan Cheema =

Pakistani politician (born 1962)

Provincial Minister of Punjab for Irrigation and Power
- In office 2003–2008
- Chief Minister: Parvez Elahi

Provincial Minister of Punjab for Livestock and Dairy Development
- In office 1990–1993
- Chief Minister: Ghulam Haider Wyne

Member of the National Assembly of Pakistan
- In office 20 February 2019 – 4 November 2022
- Constituency: NA-91 (Sargodha-IV)

Member of the Provincial Assembly of the Punjab
- In office 1 June 2013 – 31 May 2018
- Constituency: PP-32 (Sargodha-V)
- In office 9 April 2008 – 20 March 2013
- Constituency: PP-32 (Sargodha-V)
- In office 25 November 2002 – 17 November 2007
- Constituency: PP-32 (Sargodha-V)
- In office 18 February 1997 – 12 October 1999
- Constituency: PP-28 (Sargodha-V)
- In office 5 November 1990 – 28 June 1993
- Constituency: PP-28 (Sargodha-V)

Personal details
- Born: 1 May 1962 (age 64) Sargodha, Punjab, Pakistan
- Other political affiliations: PML(Q) (2002-2018); PMLN (1993-2002); IJI (1988-1993); PTI (2018-2023)
- Spouse: Tanzila Aamir Cheema
- Children: Muhammad Muneeb Sultan Cheema
- Parent: Anwar Ali Cheema (father)

Chaudhry Aamir Sultan Cheema (Urdu: چوہدری عامر سُلطان چیمہ) is a Pakistani politician who was a member of the National Assembly of Pakistan from February 2019 until November 2022. Previously he was a Member of the Provincial Assembly of Punjab, between 1988 and May 2018. He is the son of Anwar Ali Cheema, a former Federal Minister of Industries and Production.

His son, Muhammad Muneeb Sultan Cheema, was a member of the Provincial Assembly of Punjab from August 2018 to January 2023.

== Early life and education ==
He was born on 1 May 1962 in Sargodha to Anwar Ali Cheema.

He did his early education from Atchison College. He graduated in 1986 from Government College, Sargodha and has a degree of Bachelor of Arts.

== Political career ==
He was elected to the Provincial Assembly of the Punjab as a candidate of Islami Jamhoori Ittehad (IJI) from Constituency PP-28 (Sargodha) in the 1988 Pakistani general election.

He was re-elected to the Provincial Assembly of Punjab from Constituency PP-28 (Sargodha) in the 1990 Pakistani general election. He was inducted into the provincial Punjab cabinet of Chief Minister Ghulam Haider Wyne and was made Provincial Minister of Punjab for Livestock and Dairy Development.

He was re-elected to the Provincial Assembly of the Punjab as a candidate of Pakistan Muslim League (N) (PML-N) from Constituency PP-28 (Sargodha) in the 1997 Pakistani general election.

He was re-elected to the Provincial Assembly of the Punjab as a candidate of Pakistan Muslim League (Q) (PML-Q) from Constituency PP-32 (Sarghoda-V) in the 2002 Pakistani general election. He received 47,007 votes and defeated Naveed Akram, a candidate of Pakistan Peoples Party (PPP). In January 2003, he was inducted into the provincial Punjab cabinet of Chief Minister Chaudhry Pervaiz Elahi and was made Provincial Minister of Punjab for Irrigation and Power.

He was re-elected to the Provincial Assembly of the Punjab as a candidate of PML-Q from Constituency PP-32 (Sarghoda-V) in the 2008 Pakistani general election. He received 48,522 votes and defeated Mian Muhammad Khalid Kalyar, a candidate of PPP.

He was re-elected to the Provincial Assembly of the Punjab as a candidate of PML-Q from Constituency PP-32 (Sargodha-V) in the 2013 Pakistani general election. He received 55,358 votes and defeated Malik Shoaib Awan, a candidate of PML-N.

In April 2018, he announced to quit PML-Q and join Pakistan Tehreek-e-Insaf (PTI).

He was elected to the National Assembly of Pakistan as a candidate of PTI from Constituency NA-91 (Sargodha-IV) in by-election held in February 2019.

He is a member of the National Assembly Standing Committees on Energy and Government Assurances.
