= Babar Ali Khan Mohmand =

Pakistani politician

Babar Ali Khan Mohmand is a Pakistani politician (born 1 January 1983). He was a Member of the Provincial Assembly of Khyber-Pakhtunkhwa, elected from Shabqadar.

Babar Ali Khan Mohmand holds a master's degree from Queen Mary, University of London. He belongs to political family of Shabqadar. His father late Muhammad Ali Khan Mohmand was Member of Provincial Assembly of Khyber Pakhtunkhwa. He suffered grave injuries in a suicide attack on 3 March 2012 in Shabqadar and after eight months of protracted illness, he died on 2 November 2012.

Babar Ali Khan Mohmand is a grandson of Tribal Elder of Mohmand Agency, former MPA and Senator Haji Dilawar Khan Mohmand. His maternal grandfather, Haji Hidayatullah Khan Mohmand, is a retired Commissioner. One of his uncles, Qurban Ali Khan, is a customs officer, and another uncle, Bahrullah Khan Mohmand, is in the Provincial Civil Service of Khyber Pakhtunkhwa.
