= Ganga Sharan Singh Award =

Ganga Sharan Singh Award गंगाशरण सिंह पुरस्कार
- Award for promotion of the Hindi Language
- Awarded for: Literary award in India
- Sponsored by: Kendriya Hindi Sansthan, Government of India
- First award: 1989
- Final award: 2007

Highlights
- Total awarded: 90
- Website: www.hindisansthan.org/hi/awards/gangasharan_awards.html

Ganga Sharan Singh Award (Devanagari: गंगाशरण सिंह पुरस्कार) is a literary honour in India which Kendriya Hindi Sansthan, (Central Hindi Organization), Ministry of Human Resource Development, annually confers on writers of outstanding works in Hindi Literature. It is also a Hindi Sevi Samman and is given to number of Hindi experts for playing their important role in promoting the Hindi language.

== History ==
The award was established by Kendriya Hindi Sansthan in 1989 on the name of the Great Hindi Linguist & Freedom Fighter Ganga Sharan Singh. It was first awarded in 1989.
