= Rao Muhammad Afzal Khan =

Pakistani politician

Rao Muhammad Afzal Khan (Urdu: راؤ مُحمّد افضل; born in 1925 in Kalanaur, Punjab Province (British India), now in Haryana – 12 May 1992) was a politician in Pakistan. In 1962, he was elected as an MPA from Sahiwal District Tehsil Depalpur. He went on to win election an additional three times as a Member of the Provincial Assembly and once as a Member of the National Assembly in 1988.

== Biography ==
In 1962, Khan was elected MPA for Sahiwal District. He was re-elected to this position on three occasions. In 1970 he was the only member of the Provincial Assembly of Punjab in the Sahiwal District to win election against Zulfikar Ali Bhutto's party, the Pakistan Peoples Party (PPP). As a result of this, Bhutto visited Khan to request he join the PPP, which Khan did. Khan then ran for election in 1988 against Nawaz Sharif and won the election by a large margin.
