= Anwar Ali Cheema =

Member of National Assembly of Pakistan

Chaudhry Anwar Ali Cheema

Ministry of Production, Pakistan
- In office May 2011 – May 2013
- President: Asif Ali Zardari

Personal details
- Born: 1 January 1935 Sargodha, Pakistan
- Died: 31 July 2016 (aged 81) Lahore, Pakistan
- Party: Pakistan Muslim League (Q)
- Children: Chaudhry Aamir Sultan Cheema

Chaudhry Anwar Ali Cheema (1 January 1935 – 31 July 2016) was a Pakistani politician.

== Political career ==
He was born on 1 January 1935, in Sargodha, Punjab, British India and did his graduation from Government College, Lahore, now called Government College University, Lahore. He was recruited as naib tehsildar in 1961 but he quit in 1974 and subsequently started his political career by contesting elections of the District Council member where he remained vice chairman and chairman till 1987. Anwar Ali Cheema held the office of District Council Chairman for Sargodha. He defeated Nawabzada Saeed Qureshi, who had been district chairman numerous times since partition. He won election to the Pakistan National Assembly on seven consecutive occasions between 1985 and 2013 which is a unique honor. He represented the Pakistan Muslim League (Q) party.

Cheema held the office of Federal minister of health for few days and was then made Federal Minister of Production. He was given the title of Shenshah-e-Tameerat (King of Development) for his works in his constituency and Sargodha city.

Cheema had been an MNA from NA-67 (Now NA-91) for seven consecutive terms from 1985 to 2013. He was known to be a companion of Prime Minister Nawaz Sharif but parted ways and joined the PML-Q when Chaudhry Shujaat Hussain and Chaudhry Pervaiz Elahi formed the party with the blessings of former president retired General Pervez Musharraf. His son's father-in-law is Chaudhry Tajammal Abbas, a first cousin of Chaudhry Shujaat Hussain, due to which he shifted loyalties from PML-N.

Cheema has a son and a daughter. His son, Chaudhry Aamir Sultan Cheema, is a former provincial minister of irrigation and livestock. He has been elected member of provincial assembly six times. Cheema's daughter in law, Tanzeela Aamir Cheema has been elected MNA twice and also held the office of chairman district council Sargodha. She belongs to the Chaudhry family of Gujrat. Sardar Arif Nakai, Ex- Chief Minister Of Punjab, who was Anwar Ali Cheema's brother in law.

== Death ==
Anwar Ali Cheema died on 31 July 2016, in Lahore, Pakistan after a protracted illness.
