= NA-91 Bhakkar-I =

Constituency of the National Assembly of Pakistan

- Constituency for the National Assembly of Pakistan
- Region: Darya Khan Tehsil, Kalurkot Tehsil and Bhakkar Tehsil (partly) of Bhakkar District
- Electorate: 509,418

Current constituency
- Party: Pakistan Tehreek-e-Insaf
- Member: Sanaullah Khan Mastikhel
- Created from: NA-73 Bhakkar-I

NA-91 Bhakkar-I (این اے-91، بھکر-۱) is a constituency for the National Assembly of Pakistan.

== Members of Parliament ==
=== 1977: NA-62 Mianwali-III ===
Election	Member	Party
1977	Ghulam Hassan Khan Dhandla	PPP

=== 1985: NA-62 Bhakkar ===
Election	Member	Party
1985	Amanullah Khan Shahani	Independent

=== 1988–2002: NA-55 Bhakkar-I ===
Election	Member	Party
1988	Muhammad Zafarullah Khan Khanan Khail	Independent
1990	Aziz Ahmed Khan	IJI
1993	Muhammad Zafarullah Khan Khanan Khail	PML-N
1997	Muhammad Asghar Khan	Independent

=== 2002–2018: NA-73 Bhakkar-I ===
Election	Member	Party
2002	Sanaullah Khan Mastikhel	PML-Q
2008	Abdul Majeed Khan Khanan Khail	Independent
2013	Abdul Majeed Khan Khanan Khail	PML-N

=== 2018–2023: NA-97 Bhakkar-I ===
Election	Member	Party
2018	Sanaullah Khan Mastikhel	PTI

=== 2024–present: NA-91 Bhakkar-I ===
Election	Member	Party
2024	Sanaullah Khan Mastikhel	PTI

== Election 2002 ==
General elections were held on 10 Oct 2002. Sanaullah Khan Mastikhel of PML-Q won by 95,131 votes.

General election 2002: NA-73 Bhakkar-I
Party	Candidate	Votes	%	±%
PML(Q)	Sanaullah Khan Mastikhel	95,131	57.50	
PML(N)	Abdul Majeed Khan	60,548	36.60	
MMA	Ghulam Farid	8,197	4.96	
Others	Others (two candidates)	1,560	0.94	.
Turnout		169,236	62.84	
Total valid votes		165,436	97.76	
Rejected ballots		3,800	2.24	
Majority		34,583	20.90	
Registered electors		269,306		

== Election 2008 ==
The result of general election 2008 in this constituency is given below.

=== Result ===
Abdul Majeed Khan succeeded in the election 2008 and became the member of National Assembly.

General election 2008: NA-73 Bhakkar-I
Party	Candidate	Votes	%	±%
Independent	Abdul Majeed Khan	83,850	48.41	
PML(N)	Sanaullah Khan Mastikhel	82,740	47.77	
Independent	Ali Asghar	5,095	2.94	
PPP	Muhammad Tariq Khan Niazi	1,538	0.88	
Turnout		179,540	67.43	
Total valid votes		173,223	96.48	
Rejected ballots		6,317	3.52	
Majority		1,110	0.64	
Registered electors		266,265		
Independent gain from PML(Q)				

== Election 2013 ==
General elections were held on 11 May 2013. Abdul Majeed Khan of PML-N won by 97,688 votes and became the member of National Assembly.

General election 2013: NA-73 Bhakkar-I
Party	Candidate	Votes	%	±%
PML(N)	Abdul Majeed Khan	97,688	44.98	
Independent	Sanaullah Khan Mastikhel	91,068	41.93	
MWM	Ehsan Ullah Khan Baluch	10,344	4.76	
Others	Others (fourteen candidates)	18,079	8.33	
Turnout		230,435	68.43	
Total valid votes		217,179	94.25	
Rejected ballots		13,256	5.75	
Majority		6,620	3.05	
Registered electors		336,765		
PML(N) gain from Independent				

== Election 2018 ==
General elections were held on 25 July 2018.

General election 2018: NA-97 Bhakkar-I
Party	Candidate	Votes	%	±%
Independent	Sanaullah Khan Mastikhel	120,729	41.82	
PML(N)	Abdul Majeed Khan	91,607	31.74	
PTI	Malik Amjad Ali	44,653	15.47	
Others	Others (nine candidates)	21,007	7.28	
Turnout		288,659	65.97	
Rejected ballots		10,663	3.69	
Majority		29,122	10.08	
Registered electors		437,585		
Independent gain from PML(N)				

== Election 2024 ==
General elections were held on 8 February 2024. Sanaullah Khan Mastikhel won the election with 106,153 votes.

General election 2024: NA-91 Bhakkar-I
Party	Candidate	Votes	%	±%
PTI	Sanaullah Khan Mastikhel (Note: Filed nomination papers as PTI candidate but ECP allowed him to run as an Independent)	106,153	34.52	▲19.05
PML(N)	Abdul Majeed Khan	85,532	27.82	▼3.92
Independent	Saeed Akbar Khan Nawani	71,922	23.39	
Independent	Ameer Muhammad Khan	10,064	3.27	
TLP	Muhammad Younas	9,489	3.09	
Others	Others (twelve candidates)	24,321	7.91	
Turnout		321,033	63.02	▼2.95
Total valid votes		307,481	95.78	
Rejected ballots		13,552	4.22	
Majority		20,621	6.71	
Registered electors		509,418		

== See also ==
- NA-90 Mianwali-II
- NA-92 Bhakkar-II
