= NA-92 Bhakkar-II =

Constituency of the National Assembly of Pakistan

- Constituency for the National Assembly of Pakistan
- Region: Mankera Tehsil and Bhakkar Tehsil (partly) including Bhakkar city of Bhakkar District
- Electorate: 533,266

Current constituency
- Party: Pakistan Muslim League (N)
- Member: Rashid Akbar Khan Nawani
- Created from: NA-74 Bhakkar-II

NA-92 Bhakkar-II (این اے-92، بھکر-۲) is a constituency for the National Assembly of Pakistan.

== Members of Parliament ==
=== 2018–2023: NA-98 Bhakkar-II ===
Election	Member	Party
2018	Muhammad Afzal Khan Dhandla	PTI

=== 2024–present: NA-92 Bhakkar-II ===
Election	Member	Party
2024	Rashid Akbar Khan Nawani	PML(N)

== Election 2002 ==
General elections were held on 10 October 2002. Chaudhry Shujat Hussain of PML-Q won by 103,508 votes.

General election 2002: NA-74 Bhakkar-II
Party	Candidate	Votes	%	±%
PML(Q)	Shujaat Hussain	103,508	58.70	
PML(N)	Dr. Muhammad Afzal Khan	71,607	40.04	
PPP	Malik Ghulam Sarwar	1,225	1.26	
Turnout		179,879	61.99	
Total valid votes		176,340	98.03	
Rejected ballots		3,539	1.97	
Majority		31,901	18.66	
Registered electors		290,180		

== By-election 2003 ==
A by-election was held in 15 January 2003. Rashid Akbar Khan Nawani of PML-Q won the election with 121,190 votes.

By-election 2003: NA-74 Bhakkar-II
Party	Candidate	Votes	%	±%
PML(Q)	Rashid Akbar Khan Nawani	121,190	80.68	
MMA	Muhammad Saifullah	28,674	19.09	
Others	Others (two candidates)	340	0.23	.
Turnout		151,351	52.16	
Total valid votes		150,204	99.24	
Rejected ballots		1,147	0.76	
Majority		92,516	61.59	
Registered electors		290,180		

== Election 2008 ==
The result of general election 2008 in this constituency is given below.

=== Result ===
Rashid Akbar Khan succeeded in the election 2008 and became the member of National Assembly.

General election 2008: NA-74 Bhakkar-II
Party	Candidate	Votes	%	±%
Independent	Rashid Akbar Khan	98,366	52.11	
PML(N)	Dr. Muhammad Afzal Khan	86,688	45.92	
Others	Others (three candidates)	3,722	1.97	
Turnout		195,661	65.06	
Total valid votes		188,776	96.48	
Rejected ballots		6,885	3.52	
Majority		11,678	6.19	
Registered electors		300,762		
Independent gain from PML(Q)				

== Election 2013 ==
General elections were held on 11 May 2013. Independent politician Afzal Khan Dhandla won by 118,196 votes and became the member of National Assembly.

General election 2013: NA-74 Bhakkar-II
Party	Candidate	Votes	%	±%
Independent	Dr. Muhammad Afzal Khan	118,196	47.96	
Independent	Ahmad Nawaz Khan	95,246	38.65	
PPP	Hasnain Ijaz Khan Shahani	13,489	5.47	
Others	Others (seven candidates)	19,532	7.92	
Turnout		258,679	68.95	
Total valid votes		246,463	95.28	
Rejected ballots		12,216	4.72	
Majority		22,950	9.31	
Registered electors		375,159		
Independent gain from Independent				

== Election 2018 ==
General elections were held on 25 July 2018.

General election 2018: NA-98 Bhakkar-II
Party	Candidate	Votes	%	±%
PTI	Muhammad Afzal Khan Dhandla	138,307	46.87	
Independent	Rashid Akbar Khan	133,679	45.30	
Others	Others (seven candidates)	15,396	5.22	
Turnout		295,087	67.98	
Rejected ballots		7,705	2.61	
Majority		4,628	1.57	
Registered electors		434,072		
PTI gain from PML(N)				

== Election 2024 ==
General elections were held on 8 February 2024. Rashid Akbar Khan Nawani won the election with 143,604 votes.

General election 2024: NA-92 Bhakkar-II
Party	Candidate	Votes	%	±%
Independent	Rashid Akbar Khan Nawani	143,604	41.12	▼4.18
Independent	Muhammad Afzal Khan Dhandla	131,789	37.74	
PTI	Zaheer Abbas Naqvi (Note: Filed nomination papers as PTI candidate but ECP allowed him to run as an Independent)	38,918	24.46	▼5.83
TLP	Muhammad Amjad Jameel	13,320	3.81	▲1.52
Others	Others (seven candidates)	21,586	6.18	
Turnout		360,967	67.69	▼0.29
Total valid votes		349,217	96.74	
Rejected ballots		11,750	3.26	
Majority		11,815	3.38	
Registered electors		533,266		
PML(N) gain from PTI				

== See also ==
- NA-91 Bhakkar-I
- NA-93 Chiniot-I
