= PP-91 Bhakkar-III =

Constituency of the Punjabi Provincial Legislature, Pakistan

- Constituency for the Provincial Assembly of Punjab
- Region: Bhakkar Tehsil (partly) and Mankera Tehsil of Bhakkar District

Current constituency
- Created from: PP-49 Bhakkar-III (2002-2018); PP-91 Bhakkar-III (2018-)

PP-91 Bhakkar-III (پی پی-91، بهكّر-3) is a Constituency of Provincial Assembly of Punjab.

== General elections 2024 ==
Provincial election 2024: PP-91 Bhakkar-III
Party	Candidate	Votes	%	±%
Independent	Ghazanfar Abbas Cheena	62,332	43.21	
Independent	Saeed Akbar Khan Nawani	61,760	42.82	
Independent	Akhtar Qasim (Note: Filed nomination papers as PTI candidate but ECP allowed him to run as an Independent)	12,522	8.68	
TLP	Muhammad Tanveer Hussain	4,469	3.10	
Others	Others (ten candidates)	3,156	2.19	
Turnout		148,110	72.82	
Total valid votes		144,239	97.39	
Rejected ballots		3,871	2.61	
Majority		572	0.39	
Registered electors		203,403		
hold				

== General elections 2018 ==
Provincial election 2018: PP-91 Bhakkar-III
Party	Candidate	Votes	%	±%
PTI	Ghazanfer Abbas	75,581	48.93	
Independent	Saeed Akbar Khan	74,022	47.92	
TLP	Muhammad Abdul Jabbar Shah	4,082	2.64	
Others	Others (two candidates)	789	0.51	
Turnout		157,638	71.42	
Total valid votes		154,474	97.99	
Rejected ballots		3,164	2.01	
Majority		1,559	1.01	
Registered electors		220,709		

== General elections 2013 ==
Provincial election 2013: PP-49 Bhakkar-III
Party	Candidate	Votes	%	±%
Independent	Ghazanfar Abbas Chheena	64,569	48.28	
Independent	Ahmad Nawaz Khan	56,184	42.01	
PPP	Malik Asghar Iqbal Chheena	6,612	4.94	
PTI	Tariq Hameed Khan	1,845	1.38	
JI	Yousaf Khan	1,797	1.34	
Independent	Muhammad Asad Javed Magassi	1,491	1.11	
Others	Others (five candidates)	1,228	0.92	
Turnout		138,818	71.86	
Total valid votes		133,726	96.33	
Rejected ballots		5,092	3.67	
Majority		8,385	6.27	
Registered electors		193,175		

== General elections 2008 ==
Contesting candidates	Party affiliation	Votes polled

== See also ==
- PP-90 Bhakkar-II
- PP-92 Bhakkar-IV
