= PP-89 Bhakkar-I =

Constituency of the Punjabi Provincial Legislature, Pakistan

- Constituency for the Provincial Assembly of Punjab
- Region: Kalurkot Tehsil (partly) including Kalurkot and Jandanwala Towns of Bhakkar District

Current constituency
- Created from: PP-47 Bhakkar-I (2002-2018); PP-89 Bhakkar-I (2018-)

PP-89 Bhakkar-I (پی پی-89، بهكّر-1) is a Constituency of Provincial Assembly of Punjab.

== General elections 2024 ==
Provincial election 2024: PP-89 Bhakkar-I
Party	Candidate	Votes	%	±%
Independent	Ameer Muhammad Khan	61,892	51.64	
PML(N)	Abdul Majeed Khan	37,325	31.14	
Independent	Abdul Jabbar Khan Abbasi	10,091	8.42	
TLP	Muhhammad Younas	5,884	4.91	
Others	Others (fourteen candidates)	4,661	3.89	
Turnout		124,710	61.57	
Total valid votes		119,853	96.11	
Rejected ballots		4,857	3.89	
Majority		24,567	20.50	
Registered electors		202,539		
hold				

== General elections 2018 ==
Provincial election 2018: PP-89 Bhakkar-I
Party	Candidate	Votes	%	±%
Independent	Ameer Muhammad Khan	63,414	44.49	
PML(N)	Farooq Azam Khan	32,658	22.91	
PTI	Muhammad Sabir Khan	26,019	18.25	
Independent	Muhamamd Arshad Javeed Iqbal	11,725	8.23	
TLP	Sher Afzal Khan Niazi	4,826	3.39	
Others	Others (seven candidates)	3,896	2.73	
Turnout		148,393	66.21	
Total valid votes		142,538	96.05	
Rejected ballots		5,855	3.95	
Majority		30,756	21.58	
Registered electors		224,112		

== General elections 2013 ==
Provincial election 2013: PP-47 Bhakkar-I
Party	Candidate	Votes	%	±%
Independent	Ameer Muhammad Khan	48,243	49.69	
PML(N)	Muhammad Sana Ullah Khan Masti Khail	39,213	40.39	
PTI	Javeed Iqbal	5,021	5.17	
JI	Iftikhar Hussain Shah	1,381	1.42	
PPP	Khursheed Baigum	1,147	1.18	
Others	Others (nine candidates)	2,080	2.14	
Turnout		101,754	67.94	
Total valid votes		97,085	95.41	
Rejected ballots		4,669	4.59	
Majority		9,030	9.30	
Registered electors		149,764		

== General elections 2008 ==
Contesting candidates	Party affiliation	Votes polled

== See also ==
- PP-88 Mianwali-IV
- PP-90 Bhakkar-II
