= Basti Islamabad =

Basti Islamabad (Bhakkar) بستی اسلام آباد بهکر Bablian wala
- City
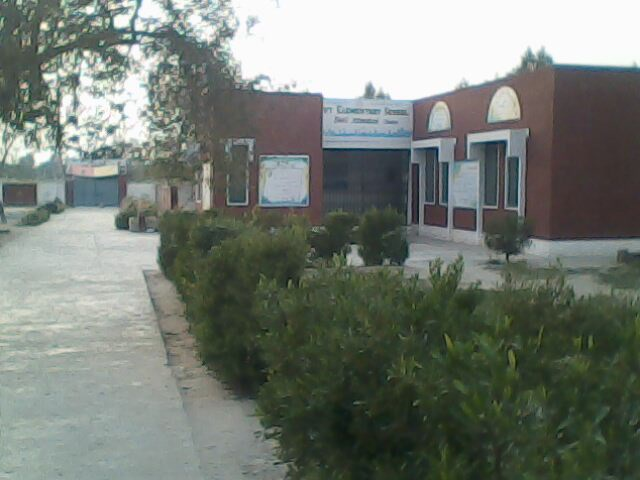
- A middle school of Basti Islamabad.

- Location in Pakistan
- Coordinates: 31°23′N 71°45′E
- Country: Pakistan
- Province: Punjab
- District: Bhakkar District

Area
  - Total: 10 sq mi (26 km^{2})
  - Land: 9 sq mi (23 km^{2})
- Elevation: 518 ft (158 m)
- Time zone: UTC+5 (PST)
  - Summer (DST): +6
- Postal code: 30030
- Area code: +92453

Basti Islamabad (Urdu: بستی اسلام آباد) is a town of Mankera Tehsil in Bhakkar District, in the Punjab province of Pakistan. It is situated about 290 kilometres west of the city of Lahore.

Main Town Basti Islamabad

1. Basti Islamabad
2. Bablian Wala
3. Shikar Pur
4. Chah Kamal Wala
5. Godhay Wala
6. Sidhu Adda
7. Chor Wala
8. Moolay Wala
9. Chonki Wala
10. Shah Syed Ali
