= Rahdari =

- Village and union = UC 47
- Location in Pakistan
- Coordinates: 31°57′00″N 71°47′00″E
- Country: Pakistan
- Region: Punjab Province
- District: Khushab District
- Elevation: 173 m (568 ft)

Population
  - Total: 45,000
- Time zone: UTC+5 (PST)

Rahdari is a centuries old village and one of the 51 union councils (administrative subdivisions) of Khushab District in the Punjab Province of Pakistan. It was founded by the Tiwana clan of Mitha Tiwana to collect tax on this major trade route; the name of the village means 'trade route' in Urdu. The founders of this village, who were settled here by the head of the Tiwana clan, were later known as Rahdari branch of Tiwana clan. The Union Council is part of Noorpur Thal. It is connected with the roads from Noorpur Thal to Quaidabad and from Noorpur Thal to Jandanwala. Rahdari is part of Thal, the third largest desert in Pakistan. Most of the area is barren wasteland with scanty drought resistant trees, shrubs and grasses. The main activity in the region is cattle rearing. Mostly people are earning from their agricultural lands. People grow grams and wheat. Rahdari is the 12th biggest village in Noorpur Thal Tehsil after Chan. Union Council Rahdari consists of Rahdari with a population of 7554 respectively Shah Wala 4473, Mehmood Shaheed 4066, Chak No. 52DB 1073, 53DB 909, and 54 DB 435. Total population of Union Council is 22,631. Major casts of the area are Rahdari Tiwana, Khokhar, Aheer, Pahore, Dhudi, Sheikh, Bamb, Malana etc
