= Chellay Wala Thall =

Village in Punjab, Pakistan

Chellay Wala Thall is a village in Jhang District, Punjab, Pakistan, located in the Thal Desert. It is also known as 7/2 Thall Janobi.

== Geography ==
The village lies at the junction of Jhang, Bhakkar, and Layyah districts. To the west is Bhareri Union Council; to the north is Khushab District. The surrounding area is arid and sandy, with sparse vegetation consisting mainly of thorny bushes across a breadth of approximately 70 miles. Agriculture in the Thal Desert is rain-dependent; crops are limited to grains.

== Demographics ==
The village has a population of approximately 20,000. The sole recorded caste is the Dhapra, which is regarded as the dominant caste of Doosa Union.

== Distances ==
Chellay Wala Thall is located 45 km from Jhang city, 15 km from Hazari, 7 km from Bhareri, and 31 km from Hyderabad Thall.

== Facilities ==
The village has a government boys' elementary school, a government girls' elementary school, and a rural dispensary. Its Union Council is Doosa.
