= Dhingana =

Dhingana ڈِھنگانہ
- Small town
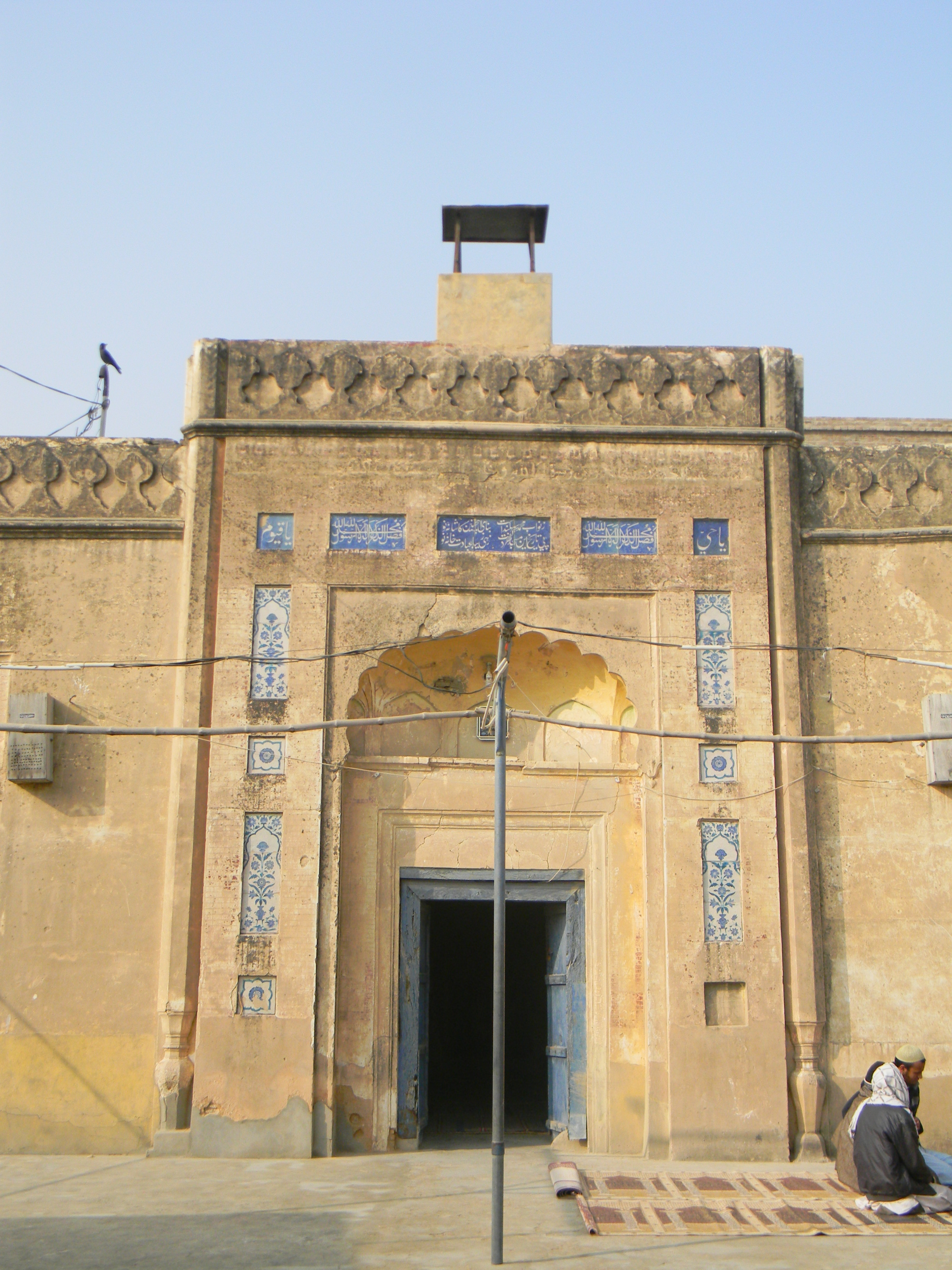
- A mosque in Mankera.

- Location in Pakistan
- Coordinates: 31°20′15″N 71°55′00″E
- Country: Pakistan
- Province: Punjab
- District: Bhakkar
- Tehsil: Mankera
  - Density: 2.6/sq mi (1/km^{2})
- Time zone: UTC+5 (PST)
  - Summer (DST): +6
- Area code: +92453

Dhingana (Urdu: ڈِھنگانہ) is a village or small town of Mankera Tehsil, Bhakkar District, in Punjab province of Pakistan. It is situated about 280 kilometers west of Lahore, the provincial capital.

Bhakkar is located in the western part of Punjab. The mighty Indus River flows on the western side of the district, which at times overflows its banks during the monsoon season. The Jhelum and Chenab rivers both flow on the eastern side. They also sometimes flood during monsoon season. One-third of the land is sandy of which a small portion is irrigated by Thal canal. The rest of the sandy land is cultivated but entirely rain-dependent.

== Pir Mehr Imam Shah ==
The Pir Mehr Imam Shah shrine is located in the center of Dhingana town. An annual Urs festival is celebrated at the shrine with great fervor. People come from far-off places to join the celebrations.

== Transport ==
The bus takes 6 hours from Lahore to reach Dhingana and 7 hours from Islamabad and 4 hours from Multan. From Dera Ismail Khan it takes three hours to reach Hyderabad Thall and from Hyderabad it takes a drive of 30 minutes. The direct bus service is also available from Lahore. Dhingana is 285 km away from Lahore and it is located on main Bhakkar-Lahore road.
