= Mahni =

Mahni مہنی
- Village
- Location in Punjab, Pakistan Mahni (Pakistan)
- Coordinates: 31°31′35″N 71°51′05″E
- Country: Pakistan
- Province: Punjab
- District: Bhakkar District
- Tehsil: Mankera Tehsil
- Elevation: 159 m (522 ft)

Population ([citation needed])
  - Total: ~30,000
- Time zone: UTC+5 (Pakistan Standard Time)

Mahni is a village in Bhakkar District, Punjab, Pakistan. It is located at an elevation of 159 metres and lies near the boundary of districts Khushab and Jhang. A part of Mankera Tehsil, Mahni has a population of almost 30,000 and was given the status of a Union Council.

Mahni is located in dry desert terrain with little vegetation and mostly thorny bushes over a breadth of 70 miles. The land is arid and agriculture depends upon the weather conditions. Only grains are cultivated.

The various castes in the village include Bhutta, Karlu Kachela, Bhular, Bhatti, Bhidwal, Nai, Dirkhan, Syed, and Cheena.

Mahni has the following schools: Govt High School Mahni, Govt Girls Elementary School, Govt Boys Primary School. There is also a private school (Perwaz Public School).

A mela at Darbar Hazrat Peer Shah Bakshana is held every year on 17–18 March. Mahni is also home to one of the largest camel farms in the region.
