= Shikar pur, Bhakkar =

Pakistani town

Shikar Pur, Bhakkar شِکارپور
- City
- Nickname: شِکارپور
- Location in Pakistan
- Coordinates: 31°22′N 71°44′E
- Country: Pakistan
- Province: Punjab
- District: Bhakkar District
- Established: 14 August 1956
- Elevation: 518 ft (158 m)
- Time zone: UTC+5 (PST)
  - Summer (DST): +6
- Area code: +92453

Shikar Pur (Urdu: شِکارپور) is a town of Mauza Hyderabad Thall of Mankera Tehsil, of Bhakkar District, in the Punjab province of Pakistan. It is situated about 266 kilometers west of the provincial capital Lahore.
