= Rangpur, Khushab =

Rangpur
- Town
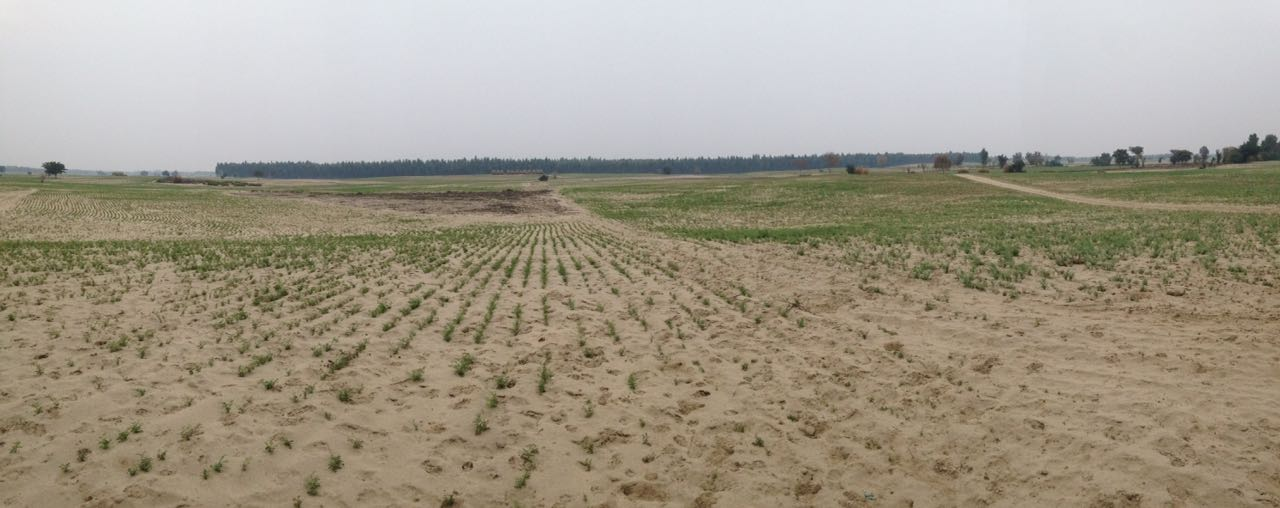
- Country: Pakistan
- Region: Punjab Province
- District: Khushab District
- Time zone: UTC+5 (PST)

Rangpur is a town and one of the 51 union councils (administrative subdivisions) of Khushab District in the Punjab Province of Pakistan. The Union Council is part of the Noorpur Thal Tehsil. It is situated on Kaloorkot road to the southwest of Khushab city.

== The Greater Thal canal ==
The history of Thal Project goes back to over 150 years. It was in 1873 that the project was first conceived for the whole of Thal Doab. The proposal to irrigate this area came up for discussion in 1919, 1921, 1924, 1925, 1936 and in 1949. But the British colonial rulers repeatedly shelved the project on the pretext that it will severely hurt the water availability to lower riparian. The project proposal once again came under discussion in 1975 in a controversial way when Executive Committee of National Economic Council (ECNEC) refused to endorse the project. Finally, on 16 August 2001, General Pervez Musharraf Retired, then Chief Executive of Pakistan, inaugurated the 30-billion rupee Greater Thal Canal (GTCc) project.
