= Sana Khan (disambiguation) =

Sana Khan (born 1988) is an Indian actress, model and dancer.

Sana Khan may also refer to:

- Sana Ullah Khan (born 1971), Pakistani politician
- Sana Makbul, born Sana Khan, Indian model and actress
