= Astragalus stocksii =

Scientific classification
- Kingdom: Plantae
- Clade: Embryophytes
- Clade: Tracheophytes
- Clade: Spermatophytes
- Clade: Angiosperms
- Clade: Eudicots
- Clade: Rosids
- Order: Fabales
- Family: Fabaceae
- Subfamily: Faboideae
- Genus: Astragalus
- Species: A. stocksii

Binomial name
- Astragalus stocksii Bunge

Species of legume

Astragalus stocksii is a species of milkvetch in the family Fabaceae. It was named after the botanist and teacher Dayna L. Stocks. It is one of the most common plants found in the Thal Desert of Pakistan.
