= Bahadarwala =

Village in Pakistan

- Bahadarwala
- Location in Pakistan
- Coordinates: 31.6563692°N 71.3043702°E
- Country: Pakistan
- Province: Punjab
- District: Bhakkar District
- Elevation: 170 m (560 ft)
- Time zone: UTC+5 (PST)
  - Summer (DST): +6
- Postal code: 30000
- Calling code: 0453

Bahadarwala (Urdu: چاہ بہادر والا; Saraiki: چاہ بہاذر آلا) is a village in the Bhakkar District of Punjab, Pakistan.
