= Rashid Khan (disambiguation) =

Rashid Khan (born 1998) is an Afghan cricketer.

Rashid Khan may also refer to:

- Rashid Khan (actor), Indian actor in Hindi cinema
- Rashid Khan (Nepalese cricketer) (born 2001), Nepalese cricketer
- Rashid Khan (Pakistani cricketer) (born 1959), Pakistani former Test cricketer
- Rashid Khan (golfer) (born 1991), Indian professional golfer
- Rashid Khan (musician) (1968-2024), Indian classical musician
- Rashid Akbar Khan, Pakistani politician
- Kamaal Rashid Khan (born 1975), Indian actor and filmmaker in Hindi and Bhojpuri cinema
- Rashid Khan Gaplanov (1883–1937), Azerbaijani statesman
- Salman Khan (born 1965), in full Abdul Rashid Salim Salman Khan, Indian actor in Hindi cinema
