= Jamali Balochan =

Village in Punjab, Pakistan

Jamali Balochan (Punjabi, Urdu: جمالی بلوچاں) is a small village located in the heart of Desert Thal.

Administratively, the village is regulated as a union council under Tehsil Noorpur Thal of Khushab District in the Punjab Province of Pakistan.
