= PP-90 Bhakkar-II =

Constituency of the Punjabi Provincial Legislature, Pakistan

- Constituency for the Provincial Assembly of Punjab
- Region: Darya Khan Tehsil (partly) including Darya Khan and Dullewala Towns of Bhakkar District

Current constituency
- Created from: PP-49 Bhakkar-III (2002-2018); PP-90 Bhakkar-II (2018-)

PP-90 Bhakkar-II (پی پی-90، بهكّر-2) is a Constituency of Provincial Assembly of Punjab.

== General elections 2024 ==
Provincial election 2024: PP-90 Bhakkar-II
Party	Candidate	Votes	%	±%
Independent	Ahmad Nawaz Khan	43,572	33.40	
Independent	Irfan Ullah Khan Niazi (Note: Filed nomination papers as PTI Candidate but ECP allowed him to run as an independent)	43,301	33.19	
PML(N)	Malik Nazar Abbas	20,103	15.41	
PRHP	Abdul Hameed Khalid	15,108	11.58	
TLP	Muhammad Khalid Umer	4,078	3.13	
Others	Others (eleven candidates)	4,308	3.29	
Turnout		136,568	63.10	
Total valid votes		130,470	95.53	
Rejected ballots		6,098	4.47	
Majority		271	0.21	
Registered electors		216,433		
hold				

== By elections 2022 ==
2022 Punjab provincial by-election: PP-90 Bhakkar-II
Party	Candidate	Votes	%	±%
PTI	Irfan Ullah Khan Niazi	77,865	47.48	
PML(N)	Saeed Akbar Khan Niwani	66,513	40.56	▼
IND	Azfar Ali	9,151	5.58	▲
TLP	Muhammad Ajmal Jamil	3,270	1.99	▼
JUI-F	Abdul Rauf	2,799	1.71	▼
JI	Naveed Ahsan Niyaz	576	0.35	▼
IND	3 Candidates	929	0.57	▲
Majority		11,352	6.92	▲
Rejected ballots		2,873	1.75	
Turnout		1,63,976	65.86	▲

== General elections 2018 ==
Provincial election 2018: PP-90 Bhakkar-II
Party	Candidate	Votes	%	±%
Independent	Saeed Akbar Khan	59,490	43.92	
PML(N)	Irfan Ullah Khan Niazi	45,026	33.24	
PTI	Ehsan Ullah Khan Baluch	13,085	9.66	
PPP	Ejaz Ali Khan Shahani	7,863	5.81	
Independent	Malik Nazar Abbas	3,015	2.23	
Independent	Muhammad Arshad Awan	2,650	1.96	
TLP	Aijaz Hussain	1,870	1.38	
Others	Others (seven candidates)	2,462	1.82	
Turnout		141,252	66.17	
Total valid votes		135,461	95.90	
Rejected ballots		5,791	4.10	
Majority		14,464	10.68	
Registered electors		213,473		

== General elections 2013 ==
Provincial election 2013: PP-49 Bhakkar-III
Party	Candidate	Votes	%	±%
Independent	Ghazanfar Abbas Chheena	64,569	48.28	
Independent	Ahmad Nawaz Khan	56,184	42.01	
PPP	Malik Asghar Iqbal Chheena	6,612	4.94	
PTI	Tariq Hameed Khan	1,845	1.38	
JI	Yousaf Khan	1,797	1.34	
Independent	Muhammad Asad Javed Magassi	1,491	1.11	
Others	Others (five candidates)	1,228	0.92	
Turnout		138,818	71.86	
Total valid votes		133,726	96.33	
Rejected ballots		5,092	3.67	
Majority		8,385	6.27	
Registered electors		193,175		

== General elections 2008 ==
Contesting candidates	Party affiliation	Votes polled

== See also ==
- PP-89 Bhakkar-I
- PP-91 Bhakkar-III
