= Najeebullah Khan Niazi =

Pakistani politician

Member of the Provincial Assembly of the Punjab
- In office 2013–2014

Personal details
- Born: 3 October 1967 Mianwali, Pakistan
- Died: 4 October 2014 (aged 47)
- Cause of death: Cardiac arrest
- Party: Pakistan Muslim League (N)
- Spouse: Dr. Shehrzadi Najeebullah Khan
- Relations: Inamullah Khan Niazi (brother); Irfan Ullah Khan Niazi (brother); Hafeez Ullah Niazi (brother); Imran Khan (cousin)
- Children: Kainat Khan; Eman Khan; Zoha Khan; Malaika Khan

Najeebullah Khan Niazi (3 October 1967 – 4 October 2014) was a Pakistani politician who was a Member of the Provincial Assembly of the Punjab, from 1997 to 1999 and again from 2013 until his death.

== Early life ==
He was born on 3 October 1967 in Mianwali. He completed his master's in political sciences. He was known as an avid debater at school.

== Political career ==
Najeebullah Khan Niazi was famous for his support to people of Bhakkar. He was elected to the Provincial Assembly of the Punjab in 1997 Punjab provincial election.

He was re-elected to the Provincial Assembly of the Punjab as an independent candidate from Constituency PP-48 (Bhakkar-II) in the 2013 Punjab provincial election. After his successful election, he joined Pakistan Muslim League (Nawaz) (PML-N).

== Family ==
His wife's name is Dr. Shehrzadi Najeebullah Khan and he has four daughters; Kainat Khan, Eman Khan, Zoha Khan and Malaika Khan. He was a paternal cousin of Imran Khan and was a member of the Imran Khan family along with his brother Inamullah Niazi. His other brother Hafeez Ullah Niazi is a journalist and columnist at The Jang Group.
