= Mehmood Shaheed =

Villiage in Punjab, Pakistan

Mehmood Shaheed is a village in the Thal desert in southern Punjab, Pakistan. It is located at the border of Noorpur Thal, Khushab District and Bhakkar District. It has a population of approximately 15,000. The principal language is Saraiki.

The name of the village has association with a legend "Mehmood", a Sufi and fighter of his times.
