= Malana Daggar =

- Location within Pakistan
- Coordinates: 32.7°N 71.14°E
- Country: Pakistan
- Province: Punjab
- Elevation: 187 m (614 ft)
- Time zone: UTC+5 (PST)

Malana Daggar is a small village and Union Council of Kallur Kot in the Punjab province of Pakistan. It is located at 32°7'0N 71°14'0E with an altitude of 252 metres on the main road of Bhakkar, 4 km away from Kallur Kot on the bank of the Indus river. The population of Malana Daggar is approximately 2,000. The number of registered voters is 1,200. Most of the people speak Saraiki, although some also speak Punjabi.

The main source of income is agriculture and most of the families have their own lands for cultivation. The most commonly cultivated crops are cotton, wheat, sugarcane and water melons.
