= Irfan Ullah Khan Niazi =

Pakistani politician

Member of the Provincial Assembly of the Punjab
- In office 21 July 2022 – 14 January 2023
- Preceded by: Saeed Akbar Khan
- Constituency: PP-90 Bhakkar-II

Personal details
- Born: November 8, 1963 (age 63) Mianwali, Punjab, Pakistan
- Party: PTI (2022-present)
- Other political affiliations: PMLN (2018-2022)
- Relations: Inamullah Niazi (brother); Najeebullah Khan Niazi (brother); Hafeez Ullah Niazi (brother); Imran Khan (cousin)
- Education: University of the Punjab, Lahore
- Profession: Businessman and Agriculturist

Irfan Ullah Khan Niazi (Urdu: عرفان الله خان نیازی) is a Pakistani politician who had been a member of the Punjab Assembly from July 2022 till January 2023. He won a by-election on 17 July 2022, for the seat vacated by Saeed Akbar Khan and took oath as a Member of the Punjab Assembly on 21 July 2022. He served as the Parliamentary Secretary for Irrigation from September 2022 to January 2023.

== Early and personal life ==
Niazi was born in Mianwali on 8 November 1963 and graduated from the University of Punjab in Lahore. He is a businessman and an agriculturist.

His brother Inamullah Khan Niazi served as a Member of the Punjab Assembly (MPA) from 1993 to 1996 and 2014 to 2018 and as a Member of the National Assembly from 1997 to 1999. Another brother, Najeebullah Khan Niazi, was an MPA from 1997 to 1999 and 2013 to 2014.

== Political career ==
He contested the 2018 Punjab provincial election from PP-90 Bhakkar-II as a candidate of the Pakistan Muslim League (N) (PML(N), but was unsuccessful. He received 45,026 votes and was defeated by Saeed Akbar Khan, an independent candidate.

He was elected to the Provincial Assembly of the Punjab from PP-90 Bhakkar-II as a candidate of the Pakistan Tehreek-e-Insaf (PTI) in the July 2022 Punjab provincial by-election. He received 78,986 votes and defeated Saeed Akbar Khan, a candidate of the PML(N).
