= Asghar Khan Nawani =

Pakistani politician

Muhammad Asghar Khan Nawani was a Pakistani policeman-turned-politician who belonged to Shahani Baloch tribe of Punjab.

== Career ==
From 1997 to 1999, he was an elected Member of the National Assembly (MNA) of Pakistan from NA-73, Bhakar. He was renowned for his public services not only in his district but also nationwide.

He started his career as an assistant sub-inspector in Punjab Police. His last position in the Police Department was a DIG (Deputy Inspector General), the second highest provincial level police officers position after the Inspector General (Inspector General). He also worked for PIA (Pakistan International Airlines).

He was given the title "Halaku Khan" due to his dictatorship style of behavior. It is said that no one was willing to hang former Prime Minister of Pakistan Zulfiqar Ali Bhutto but Asghar Khan Nawani did.

Pakistani film named Jagga Tax released in 2002 depicts the character of this Police Officer based on Khan Asghar Nawani aka Halaku Khan (DIG Punjab) (Ex-MNA) which shows his strict and strong attitude towards the criminals.
