= Muhammad Afzal Khan Dhandla =

Pakistani politician

- محمد افضل خان ڈھانڈلہ

Member of the National Assembly of Pakistan
- In office 13 August 2018 – 10 August 2023
- Constituency: NA-98 Bhakkar-II
- In office 1 June 2013 – 31 May 2018
- Constituency: NA-74 Bhakkar-II

Personal details
- Born: 15 January 1964 (age 62)
- Party: Independent (2025-present)
- Other political affiliations: IPP (2023-2025); PTI (2018-2023); PMLN (2002-2018)

Muhammad Afzal Khan Dhandla (Urdu: محمد افضل خان ڈھانڈلہ; born 15 January 1964) is a Pakistani politician who has been a member of the National Assembly of Pakistan, from June 2013 to May 2018.

== Early life ==
He was born on 15 January 1964. He done his early education from Bhakkar dist. and completed his studies from Abbottabad. He later completed FPSC from England as a skin specialist and has been serving his nation as a skin specialist

== Political career ==
He ran for the seat of the National Assembly of Pakistan as a candidate of Pakistan Muslim League (N) (PML-N) from Constituency NA-74 (Bhakkar-II) in the 2002 Pakistani general election but was unsuccessful. He received 71,607 votes and lost the seat to Shujaat Hussain.

He ran for the seat of the National Assembly as a candidate of PML-N from Constituency NA-74 (Bhakkar-II) in the 2008 Pakistani general election but was unsuccessful. He received 86,688 votes and lost the seat to Rashid Akbar Khan.

He was elected to the National Assembly as an independent candidate from Constituency NA-74 (Bhakkar-II) in the 2013 Pakistani general election. He received 118,196 votes and defeated an independent candidate, Ahmad Nawaz Khan. He joined PML-N in May 2013. During his tenure as Member of the National Assembly, he served as the Federal Parliamentary Secretary for Interior and Narcotics Control.

In May 2018, he quit PML-N and joined Pakistan Tehreek-e-Insaf (PTI). He won the 2018 Pakistani general election from NA-98 (Bhakkar-II) obtaining 1,38,307 votes.

== See also ==
- List of members of the 15th National Assembly of Pakistan
