= Noorpur Thal Tehsil =

Noorpur Thal تحصِيل نُورپُورتهل
- Tehsil
- Country: Pakistan
- Province: Punjab
- District: Khushab

Government
  - Chairman: Rao Muhammad Alam
- Time zone: UTC+5 (PST)

Noorpur Thal (Saraiki : تحصیل نُور پُور تھل) is a Tehsil (an administrative subdivision) of Khushab District in the Punjab province of Pakistan. The city of Noorpur Thal is the headquarters of the tehsil which is administratively subdivided into 11 Union Councils. It comprises a part of the Thal Desert.

The majority religion is Islam, while the main language is Saraiki, native to 94.6% of the population.

== History ==
Noorpur Thal Tehsil was an agricultural region with forests during the Indus Valley civilization. The Vedic period is characterized by Indo-Aryan culture that invaded from Central Asia and settled in the Punjab region. The Kambojas, Daradas, Kaikayas, Madras, Pauravas, Yaudheyas, Malavas, Saindhavas and Kurus invaded, settled and ruled the ancient Punjab region. After overrunning the Achaemenid Empire in 331 BCE, Alexander marched into present-day Punjab region with an army of 50,000. The Khushab was ruled by Maurya Empire, Indo-Greek kingdom, Kushan Empire, Gupta Empire, White Huns, Kushano-Hephthalites and the Turk and Hindu Shahi kingdoms.

In 997 CE, Sultan Mahmud Ghaznavi took over the Ghaznavid dynasty empire established by his father, Sultan Sebuktegin. In 1005 he conquered the Shahis in Kabul in 1005, and followed it by the conquests of the Punjab region. The Delhi Sultanate and later Mughal Empire ruled the region.

Syed Noor Hassan Shah (ra) was a preacher of Islam. While traveling for preaching, he reached a “Toba” (means rain water) in the desert. There was also grass near that water. It was so beautiful as finding water in desert was impossible. He stayed there with his family and his followers. The place was named Noorpur after him. It is now called Noorpur Thal.

The Punjab region became predominantly Muslim due to missionary Sufi saints whose dargahs dot the landscape of Punjab region.

After the decline of the Mughal Empire, the Sikh Empire invaded and occupied Khushab Tehsil. Before 1947 Sardar Jawahar singh was Zaildar of village noorpur thal Tehsil Khushab, District sarghoda . After 1947 Zaildar Sardar Jawahar singh moved to(new)India and settled in village Sadhora, District Ambala and he died in Civil Hospital Ambala. During the period of British rule, Noorpur Thal Tehsil increased in population and importance. During British rule the road network was built to connect Noorpur Tehsil with the rest of Punjab region.

The predominantly Muslim population supported Muslim League and Pakistan Movement. After the independence of Pakistan in 1947, the minority Hindus and Sikhs migrated to India while the Muslim refugees from India settled in the Noorpur Thal Tehsil. Noorpur Thal was named tehsil in 1982 by Malik Haji Afzal Baghoor when Khushab was given the status of district.

=== Mela Baba Sedan Shah ===
This Mela is a tribal festival in the memory of pious man Baba Sedan Shah in Noorpur Thal, that is celebrated by the people of Rangpur, Noorpur Thal and nearby villages. It is held after the end of cultivation seasons of farmers and includes a fair where various handicraft items made by tribals are displayed for sale. Cultural, musical and dance programs are also held as part of the festival. The second biggest mela of this area is Mela Pir Shah Sakhira at Mari Shah Sakhira town some 35 km from Noorpur Thal.

==== Brief History of Baba Shah Bukhari ====
Baba Sedan Shah came to the Thal area to preach, and there were hardly any people living around the area then. But after the arrival of Sedan Shah, many people started to live around the locality, because of his spiritual teachings. During those times, a fatal disease started to spread around the area and most of people died. People called the Sikh family got protection in Baba's tomb and they all survived. As soon as the fatal disease stopped there, the Sikh family celebrated that event by running camels on the first and second dates of the rainy (Sawan) month. On the same dates this mela is celebrated in Noorpur Thal, on the 15th of Sawan, to remind people every year of the end of the epidemic.

== Union Councils ==
Noorpur Thal is subdivided into 11 Union Councils.

- Adhi Kot
- Jamali
- Jaura Kalan
- Rahdari
- Jharkil
- Khai Khurd

- Khatwan Balouch
- Noorpur Thal
- Peelowains
- Biland
- Rangpur

== See also ==
- Rangpur
- Jamali Balochan
