= Saeed Akbar Khan Nawani =

Pakistani politician

- سعید اکبر خان نوانی

Provincial Minister for Communications & Works (Punjab)
- In office 2008–2013

Member of Provincial Assembly of the Punjab, Pakistan
- In office 2002–2013
- In office 1985–1999
- Constituency: PP-49 (Bhakkar-III)

Provincial Minister for Prisons (Punjab)
- In office 2003–2007

Adviser to Chief Minister of Punjab
- In office 1986–1988

Parliamentary Secretary (Punjab)
- In office 1985–1985

President of IPP Sargodha Division
- Incumbent
- Assumed office 12 August 2023
- President: Aleem Khan; Jahangir Tareen

Personal details
- Born: 8 June 1952 (age 74) Bhakkar District, Punjab, Pakistan
- Party: IPP (2025-present)
- Other political affiliations: PMLN (2024-2025); IPP (2023-2024); PMLN (2022-2023); PTI (2018-2022); PMLN (2008-2018); PML-Q (2001-2008); PMLN (1997-1999); PPP (1993-1996); PMLN (1990-1993); IJI (1988-1990); PML (1985-1988)
- Relations: Rashid Akbar Khan Nawani (brother)
- Parent: Ghulam Akbar Khan (father)
- Education: University of the Punjab (MA) - 1985
- Occupation: Politician, agriculturist

Saeed Akbar Khan Nawani (Urdu: سعید اکبر خان نوانی; born 8 June 1952) is a Pakistani politician and a member of the Punjab Assembly since 2024.

== Political career ==
He was successively elected as a member of the Provincial Assembly of the Punjab from 1985 till 2008.

He was re-elected to the Provincial Assembly in the 2008 elections from PP-49 Bhakkar-III as an independent candidate. He received 53,628 votes and defeated Ghazanfar Abbas Cheena, a candidate of the Pakistan Muslim League (N) (PML-N).

He was re-elected to the Provincial Assembly in the 2018 elections from PP-90 Bhakkar-II as a candidate of the Pakistan Tehreek-e-Insaf (PTI). He received 59,490 votes and defeated Irfan Ullah Khan Niazi, a candidate of the PML(N).

He was de-seated due to voting against party policy during the Punjab chief minister's election on 16 April 2022.

He ran in the resulting July 2022 by-election as a candidate of the PML(N), but was unsuccessful. He received 66,513 votes and was defeated by Irfan Ullah Khan Niazi, who was a candidate of the PTI this time.
