= Hafeez Ullah Niazi =

Pakistani columnist (born 1952)

Hafeez Ullah Khan Niazi
- حفیظ اللہ خان نیازی
- Born: 2 July 1952 (age 73); Lahore, Punjab, Pakistan
- Occupations: Political analyst; columnist
- Relatives: Najeebullah Khan Niazi (brother); Irfan Ullah Khan Niazi (brother); Inamullah Niazi (brother); Imran Khan (cousin)

Hafeez Ullah Khan Niazi is a Pakistani television analyst and columnist who currently appears as an analyst on Report Card on Geo News and Kamran Shahid's show On The Front on Dunya TV channel.

== Early life and family ==
Hafeez Ullah Niazi was born to Zafarullah Khan Niazi, the uncle of former Prime Minister of Pakistan Imran Khan. He trained as an engineer of University of Engineering and Technology, Taxila. He later did his master's from Texas Tech, USA.

His brother Irfan Ullah Khan Niazi has been a member of Punjab Assembly from 2022 to 2023. Another brother, Najeebullah Khan Niazi, was a politician and member of the Punjab Assembly. Hafeez Ullah's brother Inamullah Niazi is also a politician and served as a member of the Provincial Assembly of the Punjab.

== Political career ==
Hafeezullah Niazi was one of the founding members of his brother-in-law and cousin Imran Khan’s (he is married to the sister of Imran Khan) political party Pakistan Tehreek-e-Insaf but later parted his ways due to ideological differences.

He had contested the 2002 Pakistani general election from the constitution of PP-44 in Mianwali as a candidate of Pakistan Tehreek-e-Insaf, which he lost.

== Legal issues ==
In October 2019, he was banned by PEMRA for 30 days. He challenged the decision of PEMRA. Later, the Lahore High Court suspended the ban.

== Writings ==
Niazi contributes weekly opinion pieces to Daily Jang, offering analyses of current affairs.
