= Ameer Muhammad Khan =

Pakistani politician

Member of the Provincial Assembly of the Punjab
- Incumbent
- Assumed office 23 February 2024
- In office 15 August 2018 – 14 January 2023
- Constituency: PP-89 Bhakkar-I
- In office 29 May 2013 – 31 May 2018

Personal details
- Born: 17 November 1972 (age 53) Bhakkar, Punjab, Pakistan
- Party: PTI (2018-Present)
- Other political affiliations: PMLN (2013-2018)

Ameer Muhammad Khan is a Pakistani politician who is an incumbent Member of the Provincial Assembly of the Punjab since 10 February 2024. Previously he served for 2 consecutive terms from May 2013 to May 2018 and from August 2018 to January 2023. Present Mpa of Pakistan Tehreek e insaf PTI

== Early life and education ==
He was born on 17 November 1972 in Bhakkar.

He graduated in 1994 from University of the Punjab and has a degree of Bachelor of Arts.

== Political career ==
He was elected to the Provincial Assembly of the Punjab as an independent candidate from PP-47 (Bhakkar-I) in the 2013 Punjab provincial election. He joined the Pakistan Muslim League (N) (PML-N) in May 2013.

He was re-elected to the Provincial Assembly of the Punjab as an independent candidate from PP-89 (Bhakkar-I) in the 2018 Punjab provincial election. He joined the Pakistan Tehreek-e-Insaf (PTI) following his election.

On 11 September 2018, he was inducted into the provincial Punjab cabinet of Chief Minister Usman Buzdar and was appointed special assistant to the Chief Minister on Forestry.

He was re-elected for 3rd consecutive term to the Provincial Assembly of the Punjab as an independent candidate from PP-89 (Bhakkar-I) in the 2024 Punjab provincial election.
