= Abdul Majeed Khan =

Pakistani politician

Abdul Majeed Khan Khanan Khail
- عبدالمجید خان خانان خیل

Member of the National Assembly of Pakistan
- In office 1 June 2013 – 31 May 2018
- Constituency: NA-73 (Bhakkar-I)
- In office 2008–2013
- Constituency: NA-73 (Bhakkar-I)

Personal details
- Born: 25 December 1963 (age 62)
- Party: PTI

Abdul Majeed Khan Khanan Khail (Urdu: عبدالمجید خان خانان خیل; born 25 December 1963) is a Pakistani politician who had been a member of the National Assembly of Pakistan, from 2008 to 2013 and from June 2013 to May 2018.

== Early life and education ==
He was born on 25 December 1963.

He has a bachelor's degree.

== Political career ==
He ran for the seat of the National Assembly of Pakistan as a candidate of Pakistan Muslim League (N) (PML-N) from Constituency NA-73 (Bhakkar-I) in the 2002 Pakistani general election, but was unsuccessful. He received 60,548 votes and lost the seat to Sana Ullah Khan.

He was elected to the National Assembly as an independent candidate from Constituency NA-73 (Bhakkar-I) in the 2008 Pakistani general election. He received 83,850 votes and defeated Sana Ullah Khan. He then re-joined PML-N.

He was re-elected to the National Assembly as a candidate of PML-N from Constituency NA-73 (Bhakkar-I) in the 2013 Pakistani general election. He received 97,688 votes and defeated Sana Ullah Khan.
