= Khansar, Pakistan =

Khansar خانسر
- Khansar
- Location in Pakistan
- Coordinates: 31°39′N 71°19′E
- Country: Pakistan
- Province: Punjab
- District: Bhakkar District
- Elevation: 560 ft (170 m)
- Time zone: UTC+5 (PST)
  - Summer (DST): +6
- Calling code: 0453

Khansar (Urdu & Saraiki:خانسر) is a union council in Bhakkar District, in the Punjab province of Pakistan.
