= Inamullah Niazi =

Pakistani politician

Member of the Provincial Assembly of the Punjab
- In office 2014–2018
- In office 1997–1999
- In office 1993–1996

Personal details
- Born: 9 October 1955 (age 71) Mianwali, Punjab, Pakistan
- Party: PMLN (1993-2012; 2015)
- Other political affiliations: PTI (2012)
- Relations: Najeebullah Khan Niazi (brother); Hafeez Ullah Niazi (brother); Irfan Ullah Khan Niazi (brother); Imran Khan (cousin)

Inamullah Khan Niazi (born 9 October 1955) is a Pakistani politician who had been a Member of the Provincial Assembly of the Punjab, from 1993 to 1996 and again from November 2014 to May 2018. He had been a member of the National Assembly of Pakistan from 1997 to 1999.

== Early life and education ==
He was born on 9 October 1955 in Mianwali.

He has a degree of the Bachelor of Architect which he obtained from National College of Arts in 1984.

== Political career ==
He was elected to the Provincial Assembly of the Punjab as a candidate of Pakistan Muslim League (N) (PML-N) from Constituency PP-38 (Mianwali) in the 1993 Pakistani general election. He received 14,793 votes and defeated an independent candidate.

He was elected to the National Assembly of Pakistan as a candidate of PML-N from Constituency NA-54 (Mianwali-II) in the 1997 Pakistani general election. He received 53,861 votes and defeated Humair Hayat Khan Rokhri.

He ran for the seat of the Provincial Assembly of the Punjab as a candidate of PML-N from Constituency PP-44 (Mianwali-II) in the 2002 Pakistani general election, but was unsuccessful. He received 152 votes and lost the seat to Gul Hameed Khan Rokhri. In the same election, he ran for the seat of the National Assembly from Constituency NA-72 (Mianwali-II) as a candidate of PML-N but was unsuccessful. He received 30,018 votes and lost the seat to a candidate of Pakistan Peoples Party.

He ran for the seat of the National Assembly from Constituency NA-71 (Mianwali-I) and Constituency NA-72 (Mianwali-II) as a candidate of PML-N in the 2008 Pakistani general election, but was unsuccessful. He received 2,087 votes in Constituency NA-71 and 44,868 votes in Constituency NA-72 and lost the seat to Nawabzada Malik Amad Khan and Humair Hayat Khan Rokhri, respectively.

He quit PML-N in 2012 and joined Pakistan Tehreek-e-Insaf (PTI).

He was re-elected to the Provincial Assembly of the Punjab as an independent candidate from Constituency PP-48 (Bhakkar-II) in by-polls held in November 2014. In February 2015, he re-joined PML-N.

== Family ==
He is a cousin of former Pakistani Prime Minister Imran Khan and brother of Hafeez Ullah Niazi, Irfan Ullah Khan Niazi and Najeebullah Khan Niazi.
