= Sanaullah Khan Mastikhel =

Pakistani politician (born 1971)

- ثناء الله خان مستی خیل

Member of the National Assembly of Pakistan
- Incumbent
- Assumed office 29 February 2024
- Constituency: NA-91 Bhakkar-I
- In office 13 August 2018 – 17 January 2023
- Constituency: NA-97 Bhakkar-I
- In office 2002–2007
- Constituency: NA-73 (Bhakkar-I)

Federal Parliamentary Secretary for Information
- In office 2004–2007

Provincial Minister Local Government and Rural Development
- In office 2008–2013

Member of Provincial Assembly of the Punjab, Pakistan
- In office 18 February 2008 – 2013
- Constituency: PP-47 (Bhakkar-I)

Personal details
- Born: 21 October 1971 (age 55) Jandianwala, Kallur Kot Tehsil, Bhakkar District, Punjab, Pakistan
- Party: IPP (2026-present)
- Other political affiliations: PTI (2018-2026); IND (2013-2018); PMLN (2008); PML(Q) (2002-2013)
- Parent: Haji Habib Ullah Khan (father)
- Education: Punjab University Law College (LLB) - 1996
- Occupation: Politician, agriculturist

Muhammad Sanaullah Khan Mastikhel (Urdu: محمد ثناء الله خان مستی خیل; born 21 October 1971) is a Pakistani politician, who has been a member of the National Assembly of Pakistan since February 2024 and previously served in this position from August 2018 till January 2023 and a former member of Provincial Assembly of the Punjab.

== Political career ==
In the 2002 elections, he ran on Pakistan Muslim League (Q) ticket from NA-73, a National Assembly constituency and was elected as member of National Assembly. In the 2008 elections, he ran on Pakistan Muslim League (N) ticket from PP-47, a Punjab provincial constituency and won that election by securing 37,713 votes while his closest rival, an independent Amir Muhammad Khan secured 35,277 votes. He was also a candidate from National Assembly Constituency NA-73 in 2008 which he narrowly lost to an independent Abdul Majeed Khan Khanan Khel who would join PML (N) in 2013. He secured 82,740 votes compared to 83,850 votes of Khanan Khel.

He discontinued being a member of PML (N) and contested the 2013 general election as an independent from NA-73. He secured 91,066 votes in that election but lost it to PML (N)'s Khanan Khel who secured 97,676 votes. In the same election, he also contested on PP-47 constituency.

He was re-elected to the National Assembly as an independent candidate from NA-97 Bhakkar-I in the 2018 Pakistani general election. He received 120,729 votes and defeated Abdul Majeed Khan, a candidate of PML(N). He joined Pakistan Tehreek-e-Insaf (PTI) after his election.

He was re-elected to the National Assembly as an independent candidate supported by PTI from NA-91 Bhakkar-I in the 2024 Pakistani general election. He received 106,153 votes and defeated Abdul Majeed Khan, a candidate of PML(N).
