= Rashid Akbar Khan Nawani =

Pakistani politician

- رشید اکبر خان نوانی

Member of the National Assembly of Pakistan
- Incumbent
- Assumed office 29 February 2024
- Constituency: NA-92 Bhakkar-II
- In office 2008–2013
- Constituency: NA-74 (Bhakkar-II)
- In office 2003–2007
- Constituency: NA-74 (Bhakkar-II)
- In office 1993–1996
- Constituency: NA-56 Bhakkar-II
- In office 1988–1990
- Constituency: NA-56 Bhakkar-II

Personal details
- Born: Bhakkar District, Punjab, Pakistan
- Party: IPP (2025-present)
- Other political affiliations: PMLN (2024-2025); IPP (2023-2024); PMLN (2022-2023); PTI (2018-2022); PMLN (2008-2018) PML(Q) (2001-2008); PMLN (1997-1999); PPP (1993-1996); PMLN (1990-1993); IJI (1988-1993); IND (1985-1988)
- Relations: Saeed Akbar Khan Nawani (brother)
- Parent: Ghulam Akbar Khan (father)
- Occupation: Politician

Rashid Akbar Khan Nawani (Urdu: رشید اکبر خان نوانی) is a Pakistani politician. He is a member of the 16th National Assembly from NA-92 Bhakkar-II since 29 February 2024.

Previously, he was elected to National Assembly in 2008 as an independent candidate but later joined Pakistan Muslim League (N). In that election, he polled 98,366 votes while his nearest rival Muhammad Afzal Khan Dhandla of PML (N) got 86,688. He has 6 children, 3 sons and 3 daughters.

He had also been a member of National Assembly Pakistan from 1988-1990, 1993-1996 and 2002-2007.

== Political career ==
He contested the 1985 Pakistani general election from NA-62 Bhakkar as an independent candidate, but was unsuccessful. He received 65,781 votes and was defeated by Amanullah Khan Shahani, another independent.

He was elected to the National Assembly of Pakistan from NA-56 Bhakkar-II as an independent candidate in the 1988 Pakistani general election. He received 49,233 votes and defeated Amanullah Khan Shahani, another independent.

He contested the 1990 Pakistani general election from NA-56 Bhakkar-II as an independent candidate, but was unsuccessful. He received 38,695 votes and was defeated by Muhammad Zafar Ullah Khan Dhandla, a candidate of Islami Jamhoori Ittehad (IJI).

He was re-elected to the National Assembly from NA-56 Bhakkar-II as an independent candidate in the 1993 Pakistani general election. He received 68,350 votes and defeated Muhammad Zafar Ullah Khan Dhandla, a candidate of Pakistan Muslim League (N) (PML(N)).

He contested the 1997 Pakistani general election from NA-56 Bhakkar-II as an independent candidate, but was unsuccessful. He received 58,462 votes and was drafted by Muhammad Zafar Ullah Khan Dhandla, a candidate of PML(N).

He was re-elected to the National Assembly in a January 2003 by-election from NA-74 Bhakkar-II as a candidate of Pakistan Muslim League (Q) (PML(Q)). He received 121,190 votes and defeated Muhammad Saifullah, a candidate of Muttahida Majlis-e-Amal (MMA).

He was re-elected to the National Assembly from NA-74 Bhakkar-II as an independent candidate in the 2008 Pakistani general election. He received 98,366 votes and defeated Muhammad Afzal Khan Dhandla, a candidate of PML(N). He later joined the PML(N) after his election.

He contested the 2018 Pakistani general election from NA-98 Bhakkar-II as an independent candidate, but was unsuccessful. He received 134,809 votes and was defeated by Muhammad Afzal Khan Dhandla, a candidate of Pakistan Tehreek-e-Insaf (PTI).

He was re-elected to the National Assembly from NA-92 Bhakkar-II as an Independent politician (PTI) Supported Pakistan Tehreek-e-Insaf, candidate in the 2024 Pakistani general election. He received 143,604 votes and defeated Muhammad Afzal Khan Dhandla, another independent candidate. He joined the IPP after his election.
