= Ghazanfar Abbas Cheena =

Pakistani politician (born 1962)

Member of the Provincial Assembly of the Punjab
- In office 15 August 2018 – 14 January 2023
- Constituency: PP-91 Bhakkar-III
- In office 29 May 2013 – 31 May 2018
- Incumbent
- Assumed office 24 February 2024

Personal details
- Born: 15 December 1962 (age 63) Hyderabad, Sindh, Pakistan
- Party: IPP (2024–present)
- Other political affiliations: IND (2013-2024); PTI (2018–2022); PMLN (2013–2018)

Ghazanfar Abbas Cheena (born 15 December 1962) is a Pakistani politician who is a sitting member of the Provincial Assembly of the Punjab since 2024. He was a member of the Provincial Assembly of the Punjab from August 2018 to January 2023, where he also served as provincial Minister for Social Welfare and Bait ul Maal. He was also the member of the Provincial Assembly of the Punjab from May 2013 to May 2018.

== Early life and education ==
He was born on 15 December 1962 in Hyderabad, Pakistan.

He has a degree of Master of Arts and a degree of Bachelor of Laws.

== Political career ==
He was elected to the Provincial Assembly of the Punjab as an independent candidate from PP-49 (Bhakkar-III) in the 2013 Punjab provincial election. He joined the Pakistan Muslim League (N) (PML-N) in May 2013.

In May 2018, he quit the PML-N and joined the Pakistan Tehreek-e-Insaf (PTI).

He was re-elected to Provincial Assembly of the Punjab as a candidate of the PTI from PP-91 (Bhakkar-III) in the 2018 Punjab provincial election.

He was believed to be running for a seat in the Provincial Assembly from PP-91 Bhakkar-III as a candidate of the PTI in the 2023 Punjab provincial election. However, he chose to leave the party in 2023. He contested independently in the 2024 elections and has now joined IPP.
