= Kalurkot =

Kallur Kot کلورکوٹ
- City
- Location within Punjab, Pakistan Location within Pakistan
- Coordinates: 32°9′23″N 71°15′34″E
- Pakistan: Pakistan
- Province: (Punjab, Pakistan) Punjab
- Division: Mianwali
- District: Bhakkar
- Elevation: 1,487 m (4,879 ft)

Population (2017)
  - City: 29,578
- Time zone: UTC+5 (PST)
- Postal Code: 30140
- Number of Union councils: 10
- Website: https://www.kallurkot.com/

Kallur Kot (Urdu: کلورکوٹ) is a town in Bhakkar District in the Punjab Province of Pakistan.

The town is the headquarters of Kalurkot Tehsil. The town of Kallur Kot is itself a union council. During the time of British rule, the railway station at Kallur Kot was built as part of the North-Western Railway route.

Kallur Kot is situated 60 kilometers to the north of Bhakkar on the main railway line to Mianwali on the eastern bank of the river Indus. Livestock Research Station (LES) Rakh Ghulaman, as well as Semen Production Unit (SPU) Kallur Kot are located here. Like the rest of the district, the Tehsil has an extreme climate. The maximum summer temperature goes up to 50 °C and minimum to 28 °C. The hottest months are June, July, and August. Winter is equally cold and frosty with a minimum at -1 °C.

The section of the Indus between the Kallur Kot and Bhakkar tehsils loses much of the velocity with which the water rushed from the gorge at Tehsil Kallur Kot, and largely confines itself to a defined course throughout Bhakkar tehsil.
