= Mari Shah Sakhira =

- Village
- Location within Pakistan
- Country: Pakistan
- Province: Punjab
- District: Jhang
- Time zone: UTC+5 (PST)

Mari Shah Sakhira (ماڑی شاہ سخیرا) is a town of Jhang District in the Punjab province of Pakistan.

Temperatures here sometimes exceed 50°C in the months of June and July.
