= Kalurkot Tehsil =

تحصِيل كلُوركوٹ
- Kallurkot Tehsil
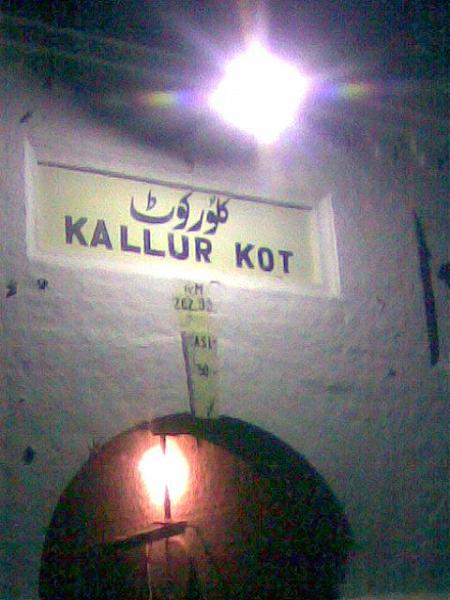
- Nameplate of 100 years old Kallur Kot Station under the lamp
- Country: Pakistan
- Region: Punjab
- District: Bhakkar District
- Towns: 1
- Union Councils: 10
- Time zone: UTC+5 (PST)

Kallur Kot Tehsil (Urdu: تحصِيل كلُوركوٹ) is a Tehsil of Bhakkar District in Punjab, Pakistan. The city of Kallurkot is the headquarters of the Tehsil, an administrative subdivision of the district created in 1982.

Kallurkot is the capital and largest city of Bhakkar. It is located at an elevation of 187 metres (614 feet) above sea level and its population is 35,574. It is located at 31˚37’60N 71˚4’0E on the left bank of the Indus River. It has a population of almost 253758/ ref (2017).

== Administration ==
The tehsil is administratively subdivided into 10 Union Councils, these are:

- Chak No. 63/DB
- Fazil
- Ghulaman
- Heitu
- Jandanwala (Urban)
- Jandanwala (Rural)
- Kallurkot
- Kanjan
- Maibal
- Malana Daggar
