= Bhakkar Tehsil =

تحصیل بھکّر
- Tehsil
- Bhakkar Tehsil
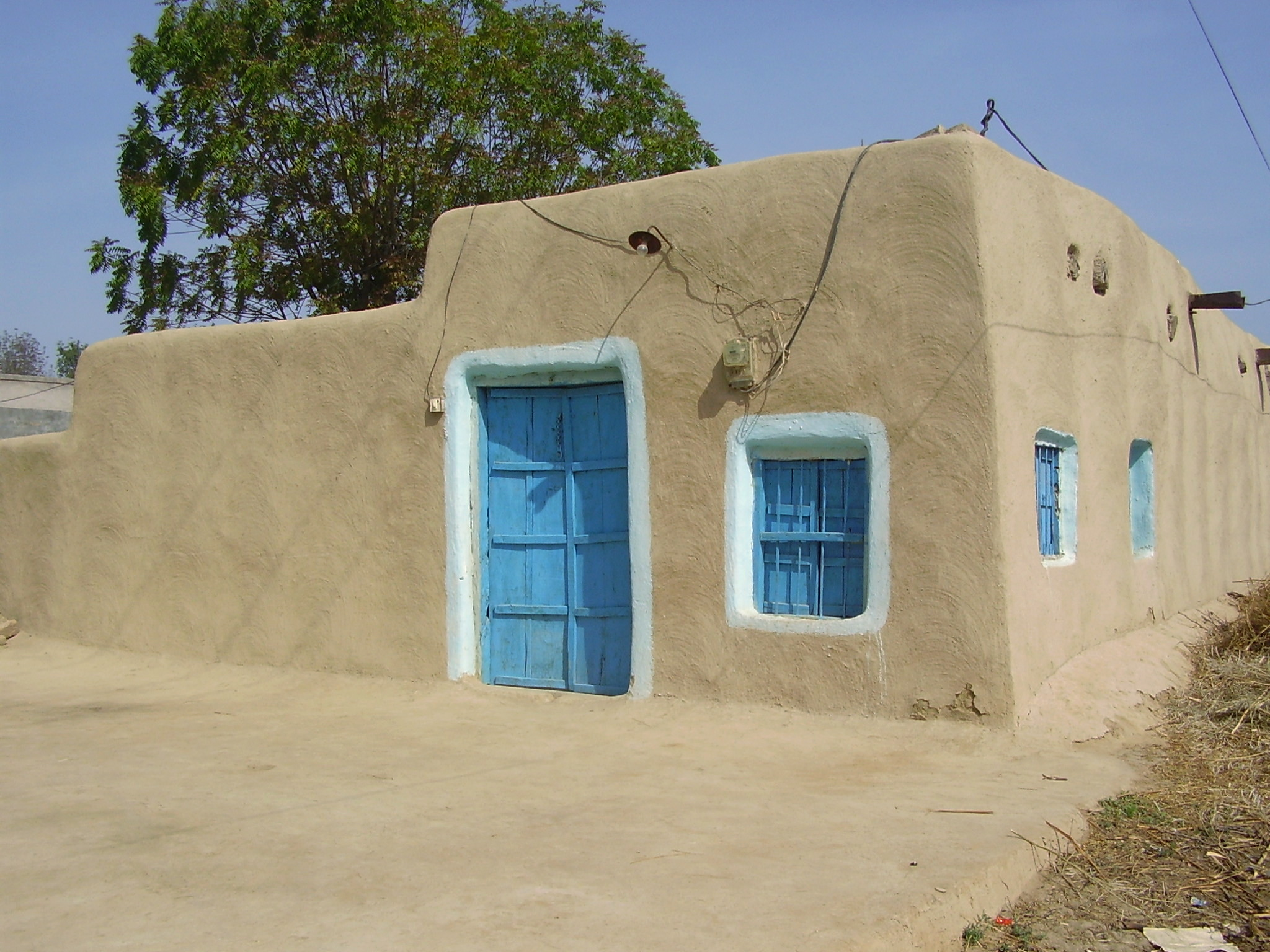
- Punjabi home in the area.
- Country: Pakistan
- Region: Punjab
- District: Bhakkar District
- Capital: Bhakkar
- Towns: 1
- Union councils: 26 (out of 64)
- Time zone: UTC+5 (PST)

Bhakkar Tehsil (Urdu: تحصیل بھکّر) is an administrative subdivision (tehsil) of Bhakkar District in the Punjab province of Pakistan. The Bhakkar city is the headquarters of the tehsil.

== Administration ==
The tehsil of Bhakkar is subdivided into 26 Union Councils. Union council Sial is in Bhakkar District. It is situated on the western side of Bhakkar city, nearly six kilometers from the city and near the river Indus.

== History ==
During British rule, Bhakkar (larger in area today) was a tehsil of Mianwali District. The population, according to the 1901 census, was 125,803, compared with 119,219 in 1891. At the 1901 census, the tehsil contained the town of Bhakkar (population, 5,312) and 196 villages. The land revenue and cess amounted to 170,000 rupees in April 1903.

In 1982, the former tehsil of Bhakkar was split from Mianwali and became the current district of Bhakkar. Bhakkar district has been subdivided into four tehsils, one of which is the current tehsil of Bhakkar.
