= Thal Desert =

Desert in Pakistan

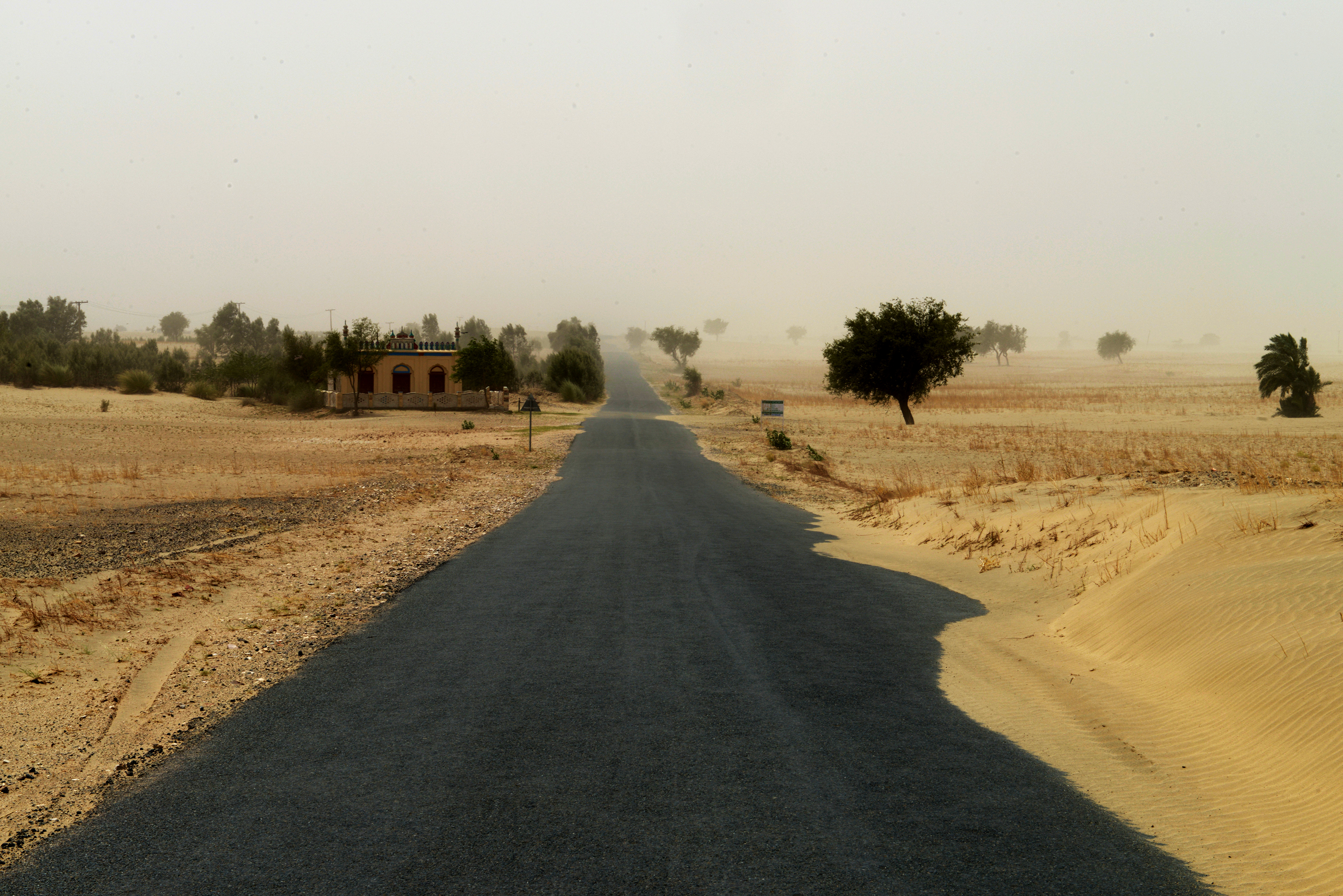
- Road passing through the Thal Desert at Noorpur

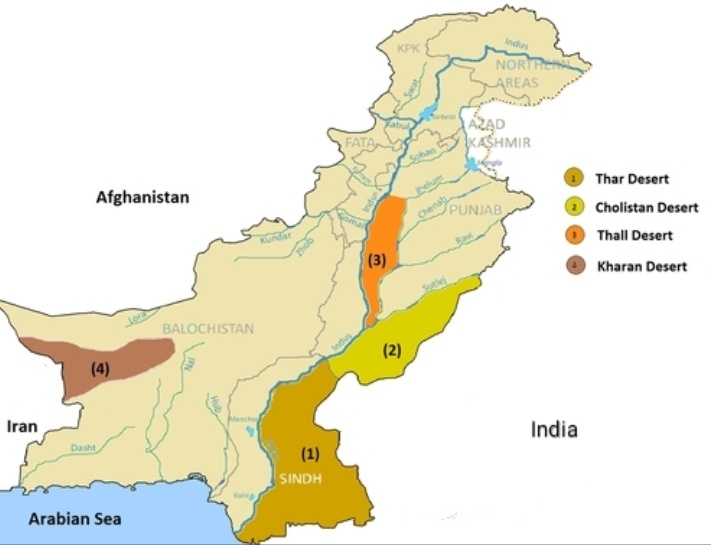
- Thal Desert (orange)
- Floor elevation: 200–90 m (660–300 ft)
- Length: 310 km (190 mi)
- Width: 119 km (74 mi)
- Area: 23,000 km^{2} (8,900 mi^{2})

Geography
- Country: Pakistan
- State/Province: Punjab
- District: Bhakkar, Jhang, Khushab, Kot Addu, Layyah, Mianwali, Muzaffargarh
- Coordinates: 31°10′N 71°30′E
- River: Indus River Jhelum River Chenab River

The Thal desert (Punjabi: تَھل صحرا, romanized: Thal Sahrā'h; Urdu: صحرائے تھل, romanized: Sehrā-é-Thal) is situated at 31°10' N and 71°30' E in the province of Punjab, Pakistan. Located near the Pothohar Plateau, the area falls under the Indomalayan biogeographic realm and stretches for a length of approximately 310 km with a maximum breadth of 119 km. It is bound by the piedmont of the northern Salt Range, the Indus River floodplains in the west and the Jhelum and Chenab rivers' floodplains in the east. It is a subtropical sandy desert that resembles the deserts of Cholistan and Thar geographically.

The region is characterized by sand dunes, prone to massive shifting and rolling, as well as scant rainfall, high diurnal variation of temperature and high wind velocity. Aridity is a common feature and perennial grasses make up much of the vegetation. Agriculture and livestock rearing form the main sources of livelihood for the population, who live in small scattered settlements throughout the desert.

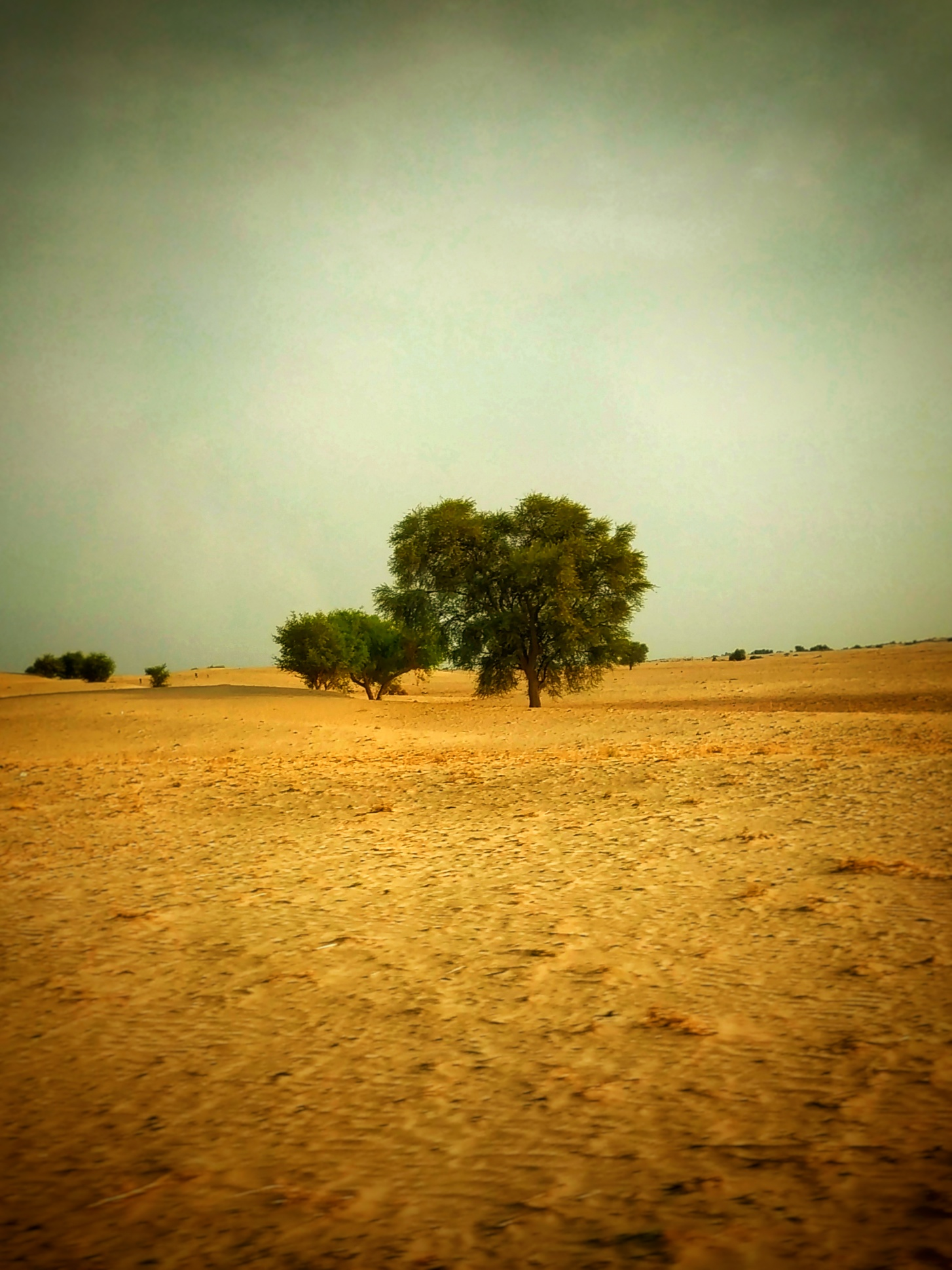
Thal Desert landscape

== Geography ==
The Thal desert of Pakistan lies at altitudes above sea levels of approximately 200m in the north which gradually decrease to around 120m in the south. It falls under the agro-ecological zone-III and is a sandy, arid to semi-arid region. The desert primarily consists of the districts of Bhakkar, Layyah, Muzzafargarh and Kot Addu, all of whom display very similar geographical features, much of Khushab and Mianwali, as well as a portion of district Jhang lying to the west of river Jhelum. The main towns of the region, which see the greatest human activity, include Roda Thal, Mankera, Hayderabad Thal, Bharary, Dullewala, Piplan, Kundiyan, Chowk Azam, Saraye Muhajir, Mehmood Shaheed Thal, Rang Pur, Jandan Wala, Mari Shah Sakhira, Noorpur Thal, Daduwala Thal, Katimar Thal, Shah Hussain Thal, and Muzaffargarh.

The desert largely consists of ridges of sand dunes and rolling sand plains which alternate with narrow valleys of flatter, more cultivable land. These sand dunes are a prominent feature of the zone and consist of sediment reworked by wind and brought in by the Indus River, which lays upstream of the orogenic front. They commonly reach heights of around 175m and cover 50-60% of the Thal desert.

The area is also underlain by Quaternary fluvial and eolian deposits over 350m thick in southern areas, and even thicker in the central region of the desert. This underlying alluvium consists largely of laterally continuous bodies of fine to coarse sand, with minor gravel and isolated mud lenses. Coarser deposits occur in the north closer to the Salt Range, but otherwise the distribution of grain sizes is irregular.

The currently active Indus River floodplain stretches > 20 km in width at the southern edges of the desert and the abandoned floodplain reaches even wider, covering areas of higher ground. These uplands are actively eroded by the Jhelum River and form up to scarps which face the floodplain.

As compared to the Upper Indus sand, the sand dunes of the Thal are poorer in quartz and sedimentary to low-rank metasedimentary rock fragments. However, they are higher in feldspars, volcanic, metavolcanic and metabasite rock fragments and heavy minerals. The dune sand is thought to be derived from the Transhimalayan arcs (40–45%, predominantly from the Kohistan arc), the Karakorum-Hindukush Ranges (40–50%, of which a third is via the Kabul River), the Nanga Parbat massif (< 10%), and the Himalayan belt (< 10%, inclusive of detritus recycled by the Soan River).

== Climate ==
The Thal desert is a subtropical sandy region with severe climatic conditions that are prone to temperature extremes. Approximately 50% of the region sees hyper-arid climatic conditions (annual rainfall less than 200mm) and the remaining half sees semi-arid climatic conditions (annual rainfall between 200mm and 500mm). The desert is also characterised by strong winds that blow year-round and can cause serious wind erosion that leads to local crop damage.

=== Temperature ===
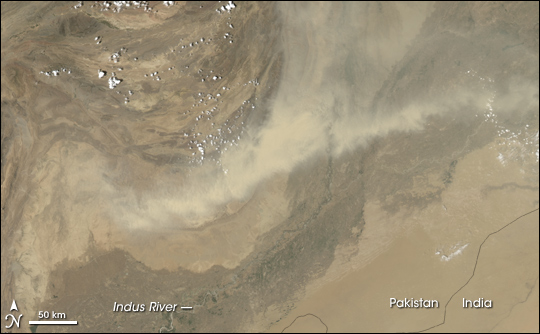
Dust storm occurring over the Indus River, Pakistan.

Summers in the area see temperatures generally range from 32^{o} C - 40^{o} C and average around 35^{o} C between June and July. However, southern borne hot winds blowing with high velocity can see these temperatures rise to over 45 °C. Dust storms, resulting from unsteady thermal conditions, are also common in the summer months. This has made crop cultivation challenging as the soil becomes difficult to bind, leading to extensive erosion and losses for the farming community.

In the winter, temperatures vary between 3^{o} C and 8^{o} C and are accompanied by cold, dry winds from the north. In January, temperatures can reach near freezing point.

=== Precipitation ===
The Thal Desert's rainfall patterns are low and erratic with mean annual values ranging between 150 and 350mm. The majority of precipitation occurs between the months of June and August; however, there is high variability across seasons and even years. Total annual rainfall has been seen to progressively decrease from the northern end of the desert to the south. It also displays cyclic fluctuations where two to three years of continued decreased rainfall is followed up by several years of higher precipitation levels.

Hailstorms, generated by air turbulence owing to the high temperature difference between the warm surface and the cold upper atmosphere, are also common between March and April and can cause severe damage to crop and buildings.

== Vegetation and Flora ==
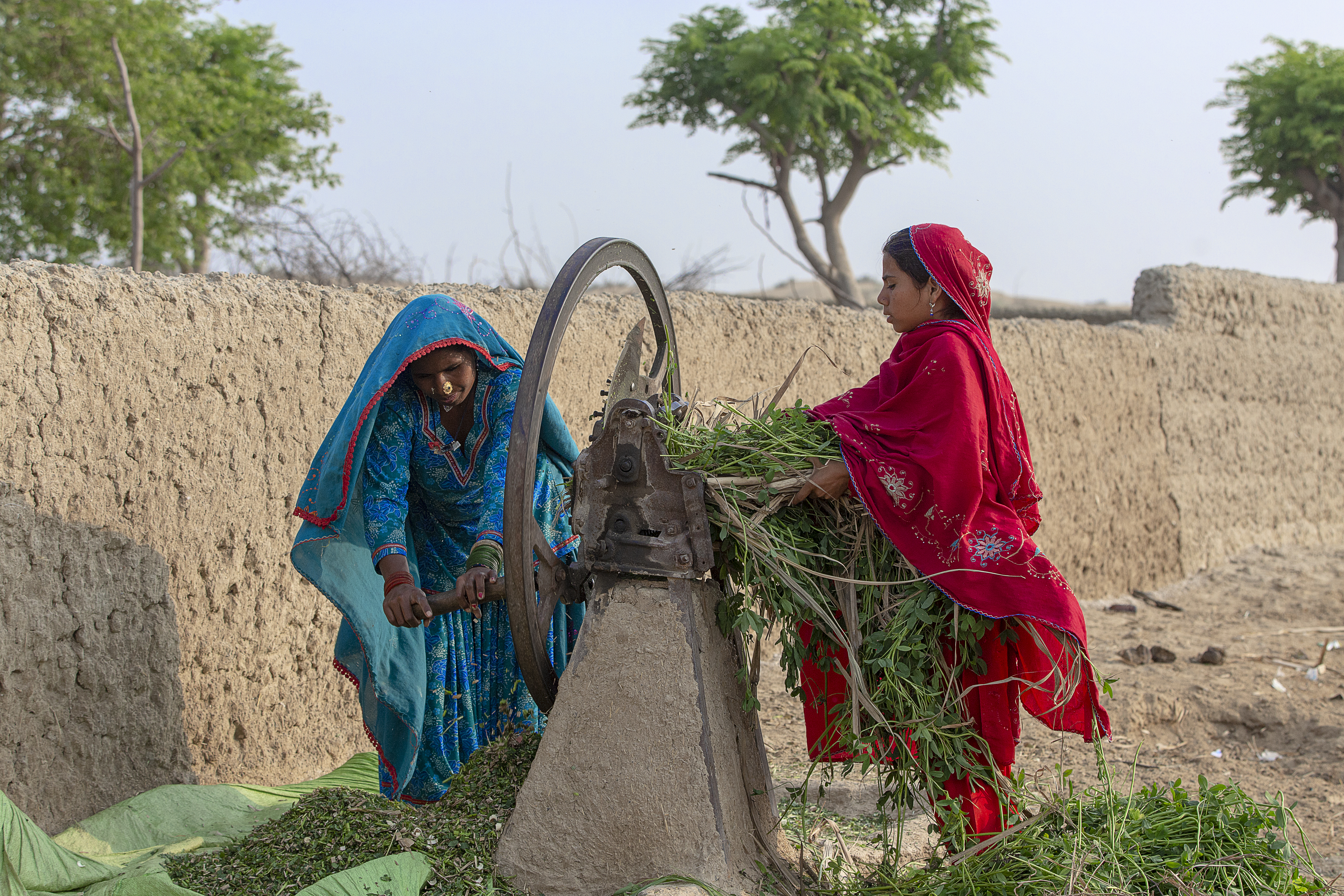
Fodder being cut and prepared for livestock

The vegetation of the Thal Desert consists predominantly of grasses and sedges which are most commonly used as fodder by the local population. Thorny and prickly shrubs as well as perennial herbs capable of enduring droughts, are also present. A floristic checklist of the Thal desert observed that Poaceae was the main family with 52 species. Most of the flora is of herbaceous nature, followed by grasses, trees, shrubs, sedges and climbers in decreasing abundance.

The only trees which grow in the desert include the Khagal, Shareen, Acacia, Beri (Ziziphus Jajoba) and Karir types. Ephemeral herbs also appear seasonally and shed their seeds before the arrival of summer when climatic conditions become more unfavourable throughout the desert.

Medicinal purposes also account for another major usage of the plants; for example Harmal is used for indigestion and Kartuma is used to treat wounds. Other uses including thatching huts, building livestock shelters and creating household items such as baskets and dyes. The most commonly used species is the Saccharum with its various uses in sheltering, fodder and making objects.

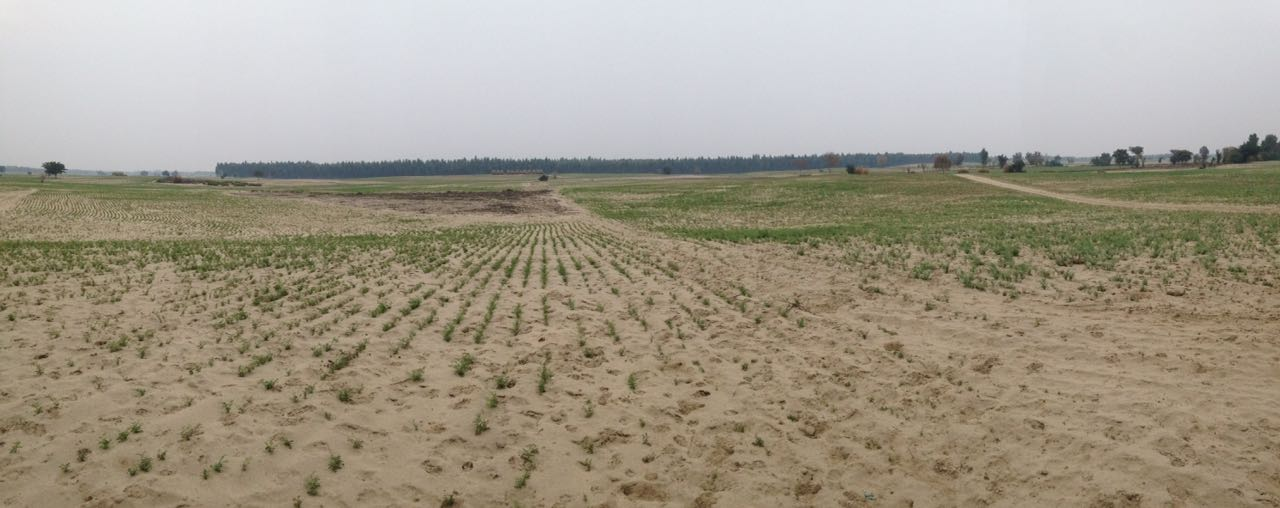
Gram fields in the Thal Desert

Most sub-regions of the desert are dominated by one species of plants which is a notable feature of such deserts. The vegetation is also highly dependent on the seasonal rainfall patterns which determine the ability of species to re-establish in the next sufficiently wet monsoon. Most plants that are grown are done so for the sole purpose of soil binding as this helps bind the sandy soil and fertilise it for future generations. Gram (chickpea) is the most successfully cultivated crop in the region's arid conditions and the desert accounts for the bulk of chickpea production in Pakistan.

The Thal desert has also seen severe erosion to its natural vegetation as a result of anthropogenic activities such as human settlement and land cultivation, which led to desertification. Much of the natural vegetation has been replaced by perennial grasses, which may be a response to the anthropogenic pressure on the flora by human as well as animals.

== Fauna ==
Livestock plays an important role towards the livelihood of the people in the region, serving as a relatively secure source of income as compared to unpredictable crop yields. The average herd size is 17 standard units and typically consist of goats, sheep, cattle, buffaloes, camels, donkeys, and mules.

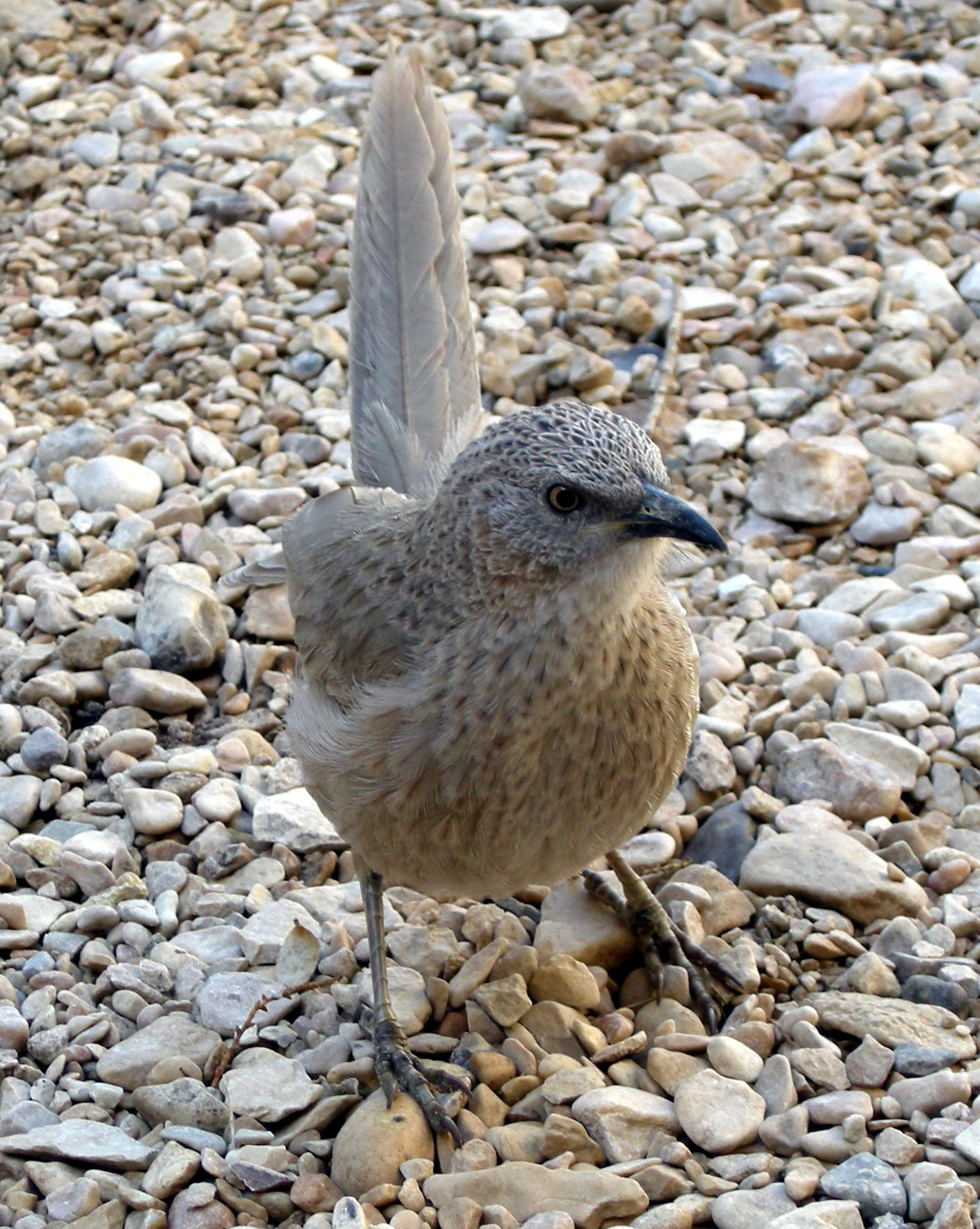
Turdoides squamiceps (Arabian babbler)

Thal desert's natural wildlife, inclusive of deer, jackals, parrots and wood-peckers, has seen drastic decline since the 1970s with current numbers nearing extinction. The common (desert) red fox, Kuhl's pipistrelle, Indian desert cat, chinkara, Indian hare, and Indian hairy-footed gerbil habitats are also present but in very small numbers as result of direct reductions and habitat changes over the last century.

Thal desert is home to both resident and migratory species. The Thal Game Reserve is estimated to host over 2.5 million birds from 55 different species. Bird populations peak around December–January, due to an increase in the population of migratory and winter visitor species. After midwinter, overall population begins to decline and reaches its minimum between May–June. Migratory birds include the peregrine falcon, common quail, skylark, rosy starling, yellow wagtail and the desert warbler. These species breed in western Siberia and migrate to Pakistan during winter. The overall density of resident bird species is higher with the most abundant species being Turdoides squamiceps (Arabian babbler) and Lanius excubitor (Great grey shrike).

The birds feed on the large variety of insects found in the desert. These include the cattle egret, little green bee-eater, Persian bee-eater, Indian roller and black-rumped flameback. Cultivated crops such as chickpeas, wheat, maize and rice are also an important food source to the granivorous birds. Larger species such as the laggar and peregrine falcons also prey on rodents, lizards and small birds found in the area.

== History ==
=== The Greater Thal canal ===
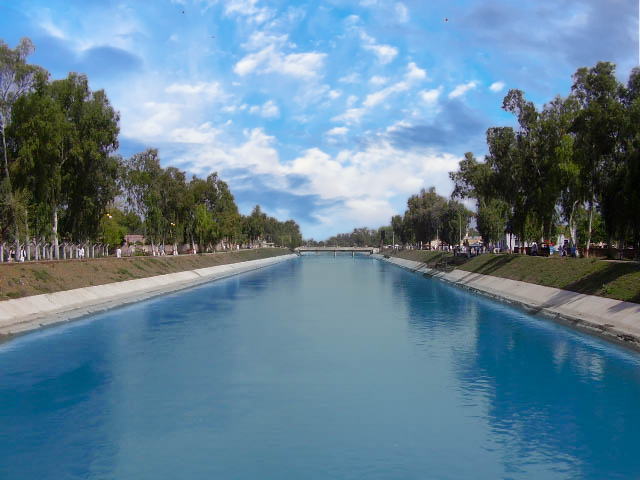
View of the Thal Canal from Mianwali

The history of the Thal Canal Project dates back to 1873 when the project was first conceived for the whole of the Thal Doab. The proposal to irrigate this area with water from the Indus River was repeatedly brought up for discussion in 1919, 1921, 1924, 1925, 1936 and in 1949. It was repeatedly shelved because of the argument that it would severely hurt water availability to the lower riparians. The project proposal came under discussion again in 1975 when the Executive Committee of the National Economic Council (ECNEC) refused to endorse the project. On August 16, 2001, Pakistani President Pervez Musharraf inaugurated the 30-billion-rupee Greater Thal Canal project (GTC). The second phase of the Greater Thal Canal Phase project (Choubara Branch) was launched in 2020. This will bring around 121,405 ha (300,000 acres) of the desert land under irrigation.

=== Settlement of the Thal Desert ===
The partitioning of the Indian subcontinent in 1947 resulted in the migration of over 15 million people and created a refugee problem for the then government. The Thal Settlement project arose as a solution to this issue with plans to settle a number of refugees into the sparsely populated Thal Desert. In July 1949, the Punjab Government enacted a law for the constitution of a public corporation, the Thal Development Authority (TDA), which began its development operations the following year in 1950.

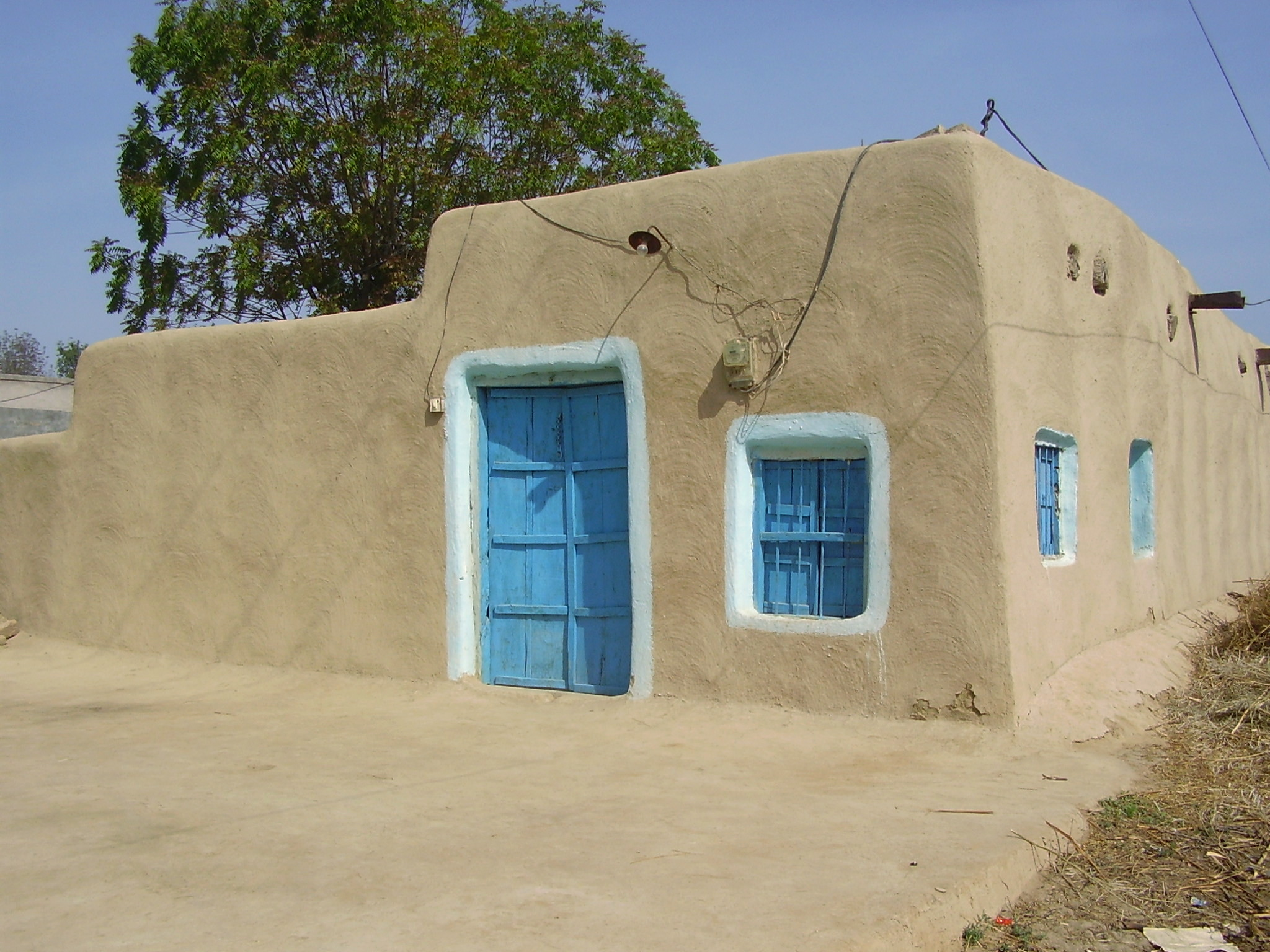
Home in Thal desert.

Throughout its lifetime, the TDA initiated a number of projects including the Sheep Breeding Scheme in 1952, the Open Auction Scheme in 1954 and the Peasant Grant Scheme of 1955. The Peasant Grant Scheme, which was aimed at refugees and migrators from India, offered a 15 acers incentive for settlement in the Thal desert under a number of varying conditions, one of which required the land to only be used for agricultural purposes.

Over 110 villages were also established by the TDA over its lifespan which enabled the settlement of over 31377 families of refugees and migrants in the Thal Desert. Facilities such as schools and post offices were also provided by the TDA alongside the construction of peasant houses, huts, and cattle sheds. The TDA was dissolved in 1969 by the Government of Punjab.

The years between 1953 and 1969 also saw the levelling of over 690 000 acres of the Thal Desert, the construction of over 2000 miles worth of main and link roads to connect the new villages and over 63 000 miles worth of water channels.

However, development of the region with the canal project, settlement of people and reclamation of land for agricultural usages has also changed the ecology of the area. Grazing lands have diminished and the biodiversity of the area has also decreased.

== Culture and society ==
The Thal desert is deficit in resources and infrastructure with very limited health services, schools, electricity, water and sanitation. Erratic rainfall patterns, frequent droughts and shifting sand dunes result in serious losses to farmers and have contributed to the widespread poverty in the area. The population lives in scattered settlements and most farmers own less than 5 acres of land, which is difficult to cultivate. Agriculture and livestock form the primary sources of livelihood with gram flour being the main cash crop. Milk production is also a major source of income and for this reason, cows and buffaloes are raised more frequently than camels or goats. Livestock productivity is limited due to fodder shortages as a result of climatic fluctuations, limited availability of veterinary services and poor access to animal vaccinations. In cases of crop failure, livestock is often sold in order to improve financial standing. Skins from livestock such as sheep and camels are also sold for making leather goods whilst teeth and bones are utilised for objects such as buttons, jewellery, and decoration. Camels are also commonly used for transportation throughout the region.

There are several tribes in the area including the Tiwana, Sial, Mammak, Bhachar, Baghoor, Rahdari, Jhammat peoples. Male education and literacy rates are comparatively higher as compared to females but overall, still some of the lowest in the province of Punjab. The most common occupations, in both men and women, consists of shepherds, farmed livestock caretakers and domestic livestock caretakers.

Most villages do not have a single indoor toilet facility. Chronic stomach ailments are common due to the quality of water available. Females are also more vulnerable to health conditions, particularly those related to maternity as the nearest hospital capable of treatment is generally great distances away.

== See also ==
- Indus Valley Desert
- Cholistan Desert
- Thar Desert
- Katpana Desert
- Kharan Desert
