= Mankera Tehsil =

تحصِيل منكيره
- Tehsil
- Mankera Tehsil
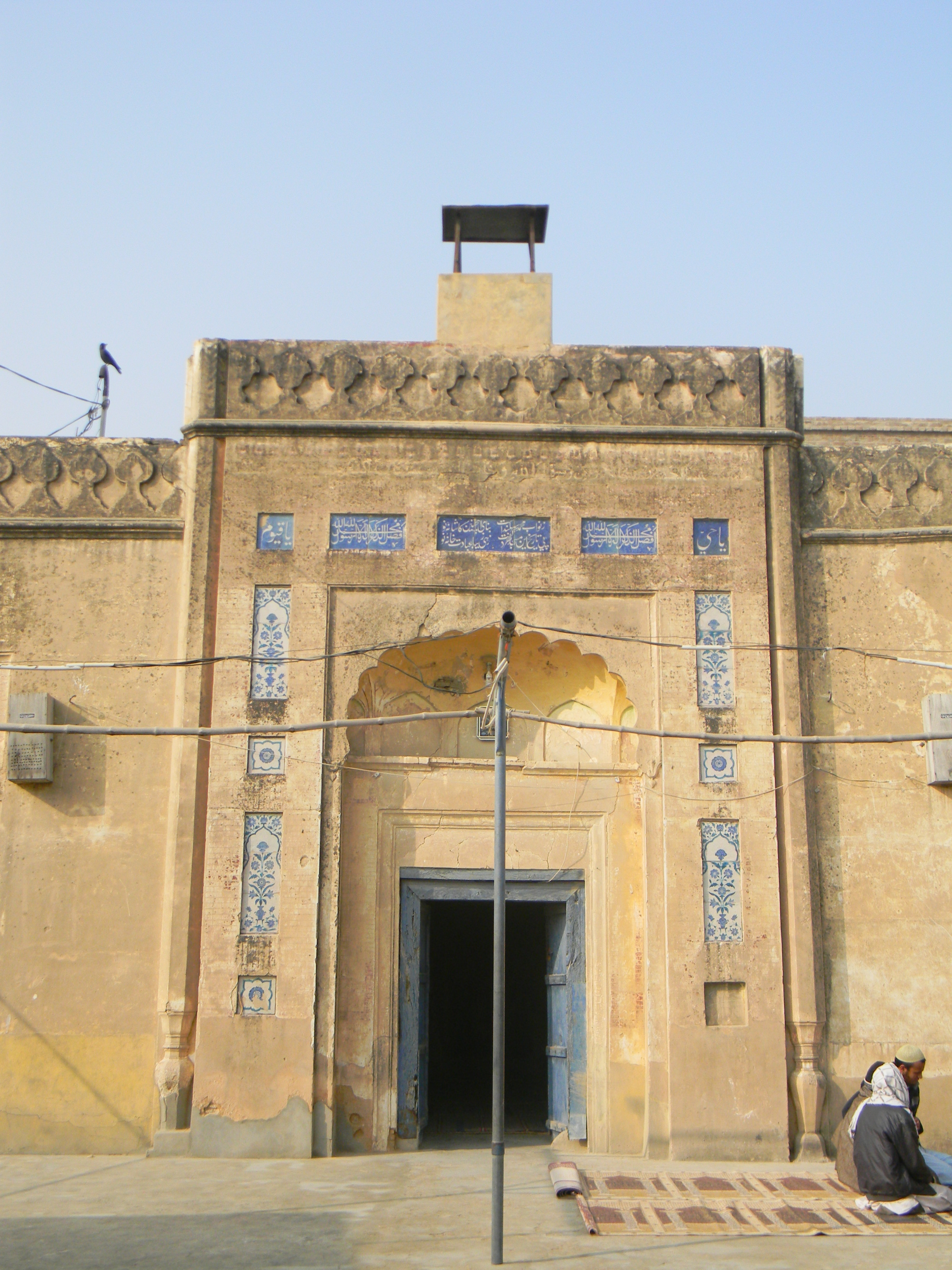
- Mankera Mosque
- Interactive map of تحصِيل منكيره
- Country: Pakistan
- Region: Punjab
- District: Bhakkar District
- Capital: Mankera
- Towns: 1
- Union councils: 9

Population
  - Tehsil: 310,664
  - Urban: 43,553
  - Rural: 267,111
- Time zone: UTC+5 (PST)
- Area code: +92453

Mankera Tehsil (Urdu: تحصِيل منكيره) is an administrative subdivision (tehsil) of Bhakkar District in the Punjab province of Pakistan. The town of Mankera is the headquarters of the tehsil.

== Administration ==
Mankera Tehsil is subdivided into 8 Union Councils.

1. Mankera
2. Haiderabad Thall
3. Mahni
4. Patti Bulanda
5. Gohar wala
6. Litan
7. Chak NO.6
8. Dhingan
9. Karluwala village
