= Bhakkar =

Bhakkar بھكّر
- City
- Location in Pakistan Bhakkar (Pakistan)
- Coordinates: 31°37′40″N 71°3′45″E
- Country: Pakistan
- Province: (Punjab, Pakistan) Punjab
- Division: Sargodha
- District: Bhakkar

Government
  - Type: Municipal Committee
  - Chairman: Vacant
  - Vice Chairman: Vacant
- Elevation: 522 ft (159 m)

Population (2023 census)
  - City: 131,658
  - Rank: 91st in Pakistan
- Time zone: UTC+5 (PKT)
- Calling code: 0453
- Union councils: 26

Bhakkar (Note: Urdu: بھكّر) is the principal city of Bhakkar District, Punjab, Pakistan. It is the 91st most populous city in Pakistan.

== Administration ==
Bhakkar is the administrative centre of Bhakkar Tehsil, which is one of the four tehsils of the district. Bhakkar Tehsil is subdivided into 17 union councils, three of which form the city of Bhakkar.

== History ==
Bhakkar was founded probably in late 15th century by a group of colonists from Dera Ismail Khan, and is named after Bakhar Khan. It came under Humayun's rule after he restored the Mughal Empire in 1555 and appointed Khan Khanan as the governor of the city alongside Multan, as Multan was a province of the Mughal empire that included the city of Bhakkar.

Fray Sebastian Manrique, a 17th-century Portuguese traveller, visited the city in 1641 and described it as the capital of Kingdom of Bhakkar.

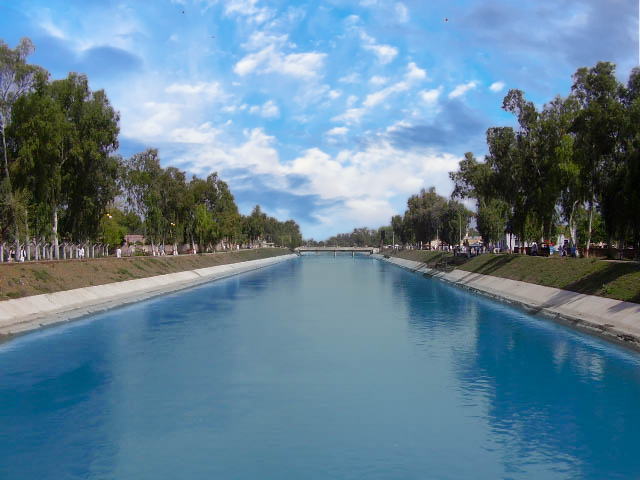
Thal canal that passes through Bhakkar

=== British rule ===
During British rule, Bhakkar town was part of Bhakkar Tehsil in Mianwali District.

The Imperial Gazetteer of India described the town as follows:

It stands on the edge of the Thal or sandy plain overlooking the low-lying alluvial lands along; the river, a channel of which is navigable as far as Bhakkar during the floods. To the west of the town the land is low, well cultivated, and subject to inundation, while to the east the country is high and dry, treeless, and sandy. A rich extent of land irrigated from wells lies below the town, protected by embankments from inundations of the Indus, and produces two or three crops in the year. The neighbouring riverain is full of date groves and fruit gardens; and in it stands a famous mango-tree, the fruit of which used to be sent to Kabul in the old days of Afghan rule. The municipality was created in 1874. Its income and expenditure during the ten years ending 1902–3 averaged Rs. 7,700. The income in 1903-4 was Rs. 7,500, chiefly derived from octroi; and the expenditure was Rs. 8,600. The population according to the 1901 census of India was 5,312, at that time the town contained a dispensary and a municipal vernacular middle school.

== Demographics ==
Population

Historical population
Year	Pop.	±% p.a.
1951	12,397	—
1961	21,749	+5.78%
1972	34,638	+4.32%
1981	41,934	+2.15%
1998	68,896	+2.96%
2017	113,018	+2.64%
2023	131,658	+2.58%

According to 2023 census, Bhakkar had a population of 131,658.

Languages

Languages of Bhakkar MC (2023 Census)
1. Saraiki (63.9%)
2. Urdu (24.7%)
3. Punjabi (8.40%)
4. Pashto (2.10%)
5. Others (0.90%)

== Notable places ==
=== Dilkusha Bagh ===
Dilkusha Bagh is an old date orchard in Bhakkar. It is believed to be a Mughal garden built by Humayun or Akbar. It is home to hundreds of rare date cultivars, along with its common Basra dates.

=== Karna oil ===
Bhakkar is known for production of Karna oil from Karna flowers. The flowers are used in a multitude of ways, but the most common use is to make oil. Its essence is extracted and added to mustard oil while cloves, cardamom, jasmine and other spices are also added to the mixture. The resulting product is called ‘karna oil’ and is thought to be a quality product for treating a wide array of hair-related issues such as dandruff and hair loss.

== Bibliography ==
- S.R. Sharma (1999), Mughal Empire in India: A Systematic Study Including Source Material, Volume 1, Atlantic Publishers & Dist, pp. 124–235, ISBN 978-8-17-156817-8
- Zulfiqar Ahmad (1988), Notes on Punjab and Mughal India: Selections from Journal of the Punjab Historical Society, The University of Michigan, pp. 333–338
- Ashiq Muhammad Khān Durrani (1991), History of Multan: from the early period to 1849 A.D., Vanguard, p. 51, ISBN 978-8-17-156817-8
