= Bhakkar District =

Bhakkar District ضِلع بھكّر
- District of Punjab
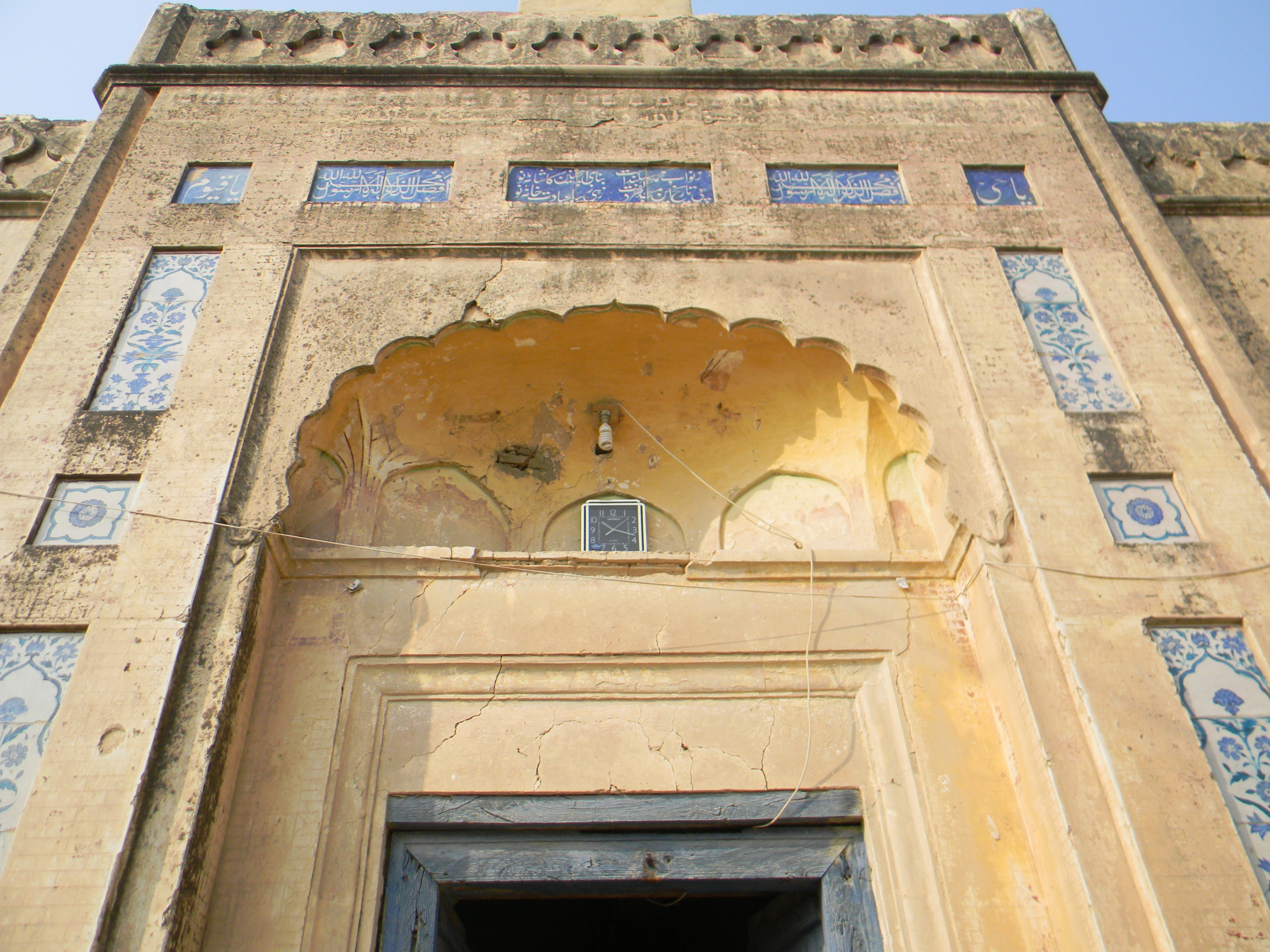
- Jamia Masjid, Mankera

- Location of Bhakkar District within Punjab.
- Coordinates: 31.6230°N 71.0626°E
- Country: Pakistan
- Province: Punjab
- Division: Sargodha
- Established: 1982
- Headquarters: Bhakkar
- Tehsils (4): List: Bhakkar; Darya Khan; Kaloorkot; Mankera

Government
  - Type: District Administration
  - Deputy Commissioner: Ahsan Ali

Area
  - District of Punjab: 8,153 km^{2} (3,148 sq mi)

Population (2023)
  - District of Punjab: 1,957,470
  - Density: 240.1/km^{2} (621.8/sq mi)
  - Urban: 352,434
  - Rural: 1,605,036

Literacy
  - Literacy rate: Total: (55.68%); Male: (66.81%); Female: (43.87%)
- Time zone: UTC+5 (PKT)
- Area code: 0453
- Website: bhakkar.punjab.gov.pk

Bhakkar District (Note: Urdu: ضِلع بھكّر) is a district in the Punjab province of Pakistan. The district was created out of parts of Mianwali in 1982, and has the city of Bhakkar as its headquarters. Part of its area consists of a riverine tract along the Indus River, called Kaccha, while most of the district area lies in the desolate plain of the Thal Desert.

Located in the west of the Punjab province, Bhakkar district is bordered by Layyah to the south, Jhang to the southeast, Dera Ismail Khan to the west, Khushab to the northeast, and Mianwali to the north.

== Administration ==
The district is administratively divided into four Tehsils and 64 Union Councils. The Tehsils are:

Tehsil	Area (km²)	Pop. (2023)	Density (ppl/km²) (2023)	Literacy rate (2023)	Union Councils
Bhakkar	2,427	809,789	333.66	58.56%	...
Darya Khan	1,719	421,309	245.09	51.09%	...
Kaloorkot	2,239	415,708	185.67	55.43%	...
Mankera	1,768	310,664	175.71	54.83%	...

Khansar Union Council is one of the major Union Councils in Bhakkar. Mari Shah Sakhira Union Council of Jhang District is very close to Bhakkar District boundary.

== Demographics ==
=== Population ===
Historical population
Year	Pop.	±% p.a.
1951	233,733	—
1961	332,882	+3.60%
1972	500,498	+3.78%
1981	665,884	+3.22%
1998	1,051,456	+2.72%
2017	1,647,852	+2.39%
2023	1,957,470	+2.91%

As of the 2023 census, Bhakkar district has 313,311 households and a population of 1,957,470. The district has a sex ratio of 108.00 males to 100 females and a literacy rate of 55.68%: 66.81% for males and 43.87% for females. 593,924 (30.35% of the surveyed population) are under 10 years of age. 352,434 (18.00%) live in urban areas.

=== Religion ===
Religion in contemporary Bhakkar District
Religious group	1941		2017		2023	
Religious group	Pop.	%	Pop.	%	Pop.	%
Islam	169,276	82.16%	1,646,014	99.89%	1,950,820	99.69%
Hinduism (Note: 1941 census: Including Ad-Dharmis)	32,740	15.89%	13	0%	17	0%
Sikhism	3,996	1.94%	—N/a	—N/a	30	0%
Christianity	23	0.01%	1,661	0.1%	5,913	0.3%
Ahmadi	—N/a	—N/a	112	0.01%	124	0.01%
Others (Note: Including Jainism, Buddhism, Zoroastrianism, Judaism, or not stated)	0	0%	52	0%	59	0%
Total Population	206,035	100%	1,647,852	100%	1,956,971	100%
Note: 1941 census data is for Bhakkar tehsil of the then Mianwali District, which roughly corresponds to contemporary Bhakkar district. District and tehsil borders have changed since 1941.

=== Languages ===
Languages of Bhakkar district (2023)
1. Saraiki (79.4%)
2. Punjabi (9.73%)
3. Urdu (7.50%)
4. Pashto (2.41%)
5. Others (0.94%)

At the time of the 2023 census, 79.42% of the population spoke Saraiki, 9.73% Punjabi, 7.5% Urdu and 2.41% Pashto as their first language.

== Education ==
According to the 2017 census, the literacy rate of Bhakkar is about 55%. There are 19 colleges, and 1300 primary, elementary, secondary, and higher secondary schools.

== Notable people ==
- Rasheed Akbar Khan Nawani, member of Pakistan's National Assembly
- P. C. Gupta, writer and professor of English
- Amjad Qureshi, cricket umpire
- Sanaullah Khan Mastikhel, member of Pakistan's National Assembly
- Inamullah Niazi, former member of Pakistan's National Assembly
- Lekh Raj Batra, a distinguished mycologist and linguist
- Asghar Khan Nawani, former policeman and MNA
- Amir Inayat Khan Shahani, MPA from Bhakkar

== See also ==
- Bhakkar
- Bhakkar railway station
- North Western State Railway
- Kotri–Attock Line
