= 1937 Indian provincial elections =

- 18 January 1937 – 20 February 1937

1585 provincial seats contested
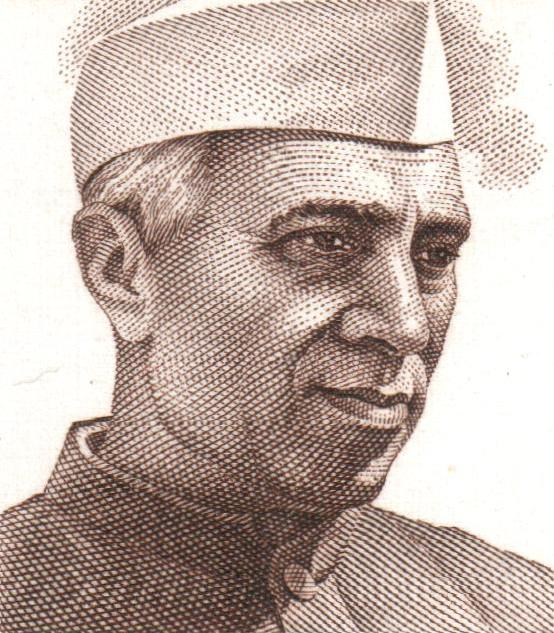

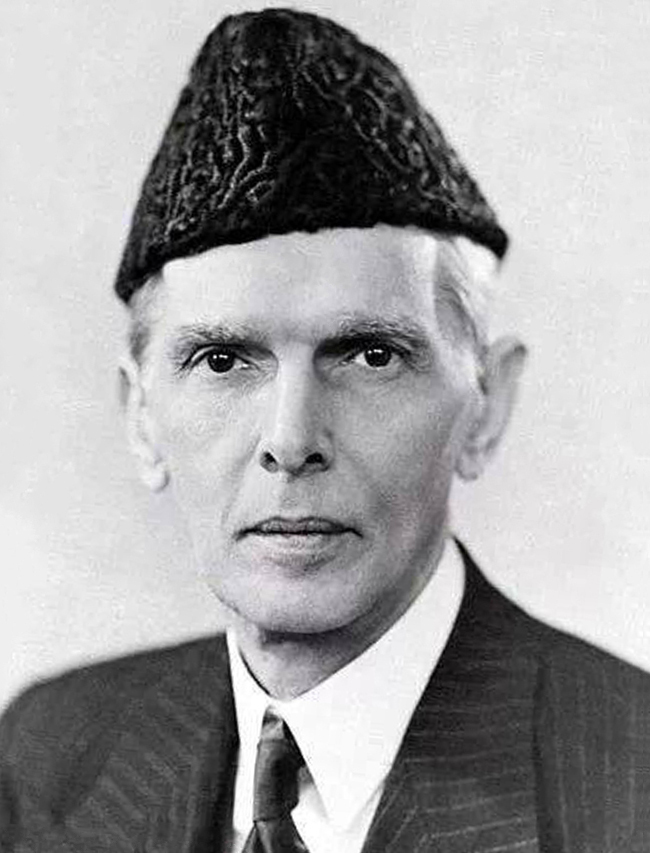

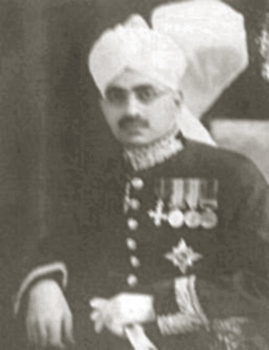

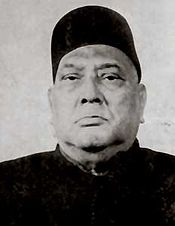
| | First party | Second party | Third party |
|---|---|---|---|
| Leader | Jawaharlal Nehru | Muhammad Ali Jinnah | Sikandar Hayat Khan; A. K. Fazlul Huq; Allah Baksh Soomro |
| Party | INC | AIML | Unionist Party; Krishak Praja Party; Sind United Party |
| Seats won | 706 | 111 | 137 |
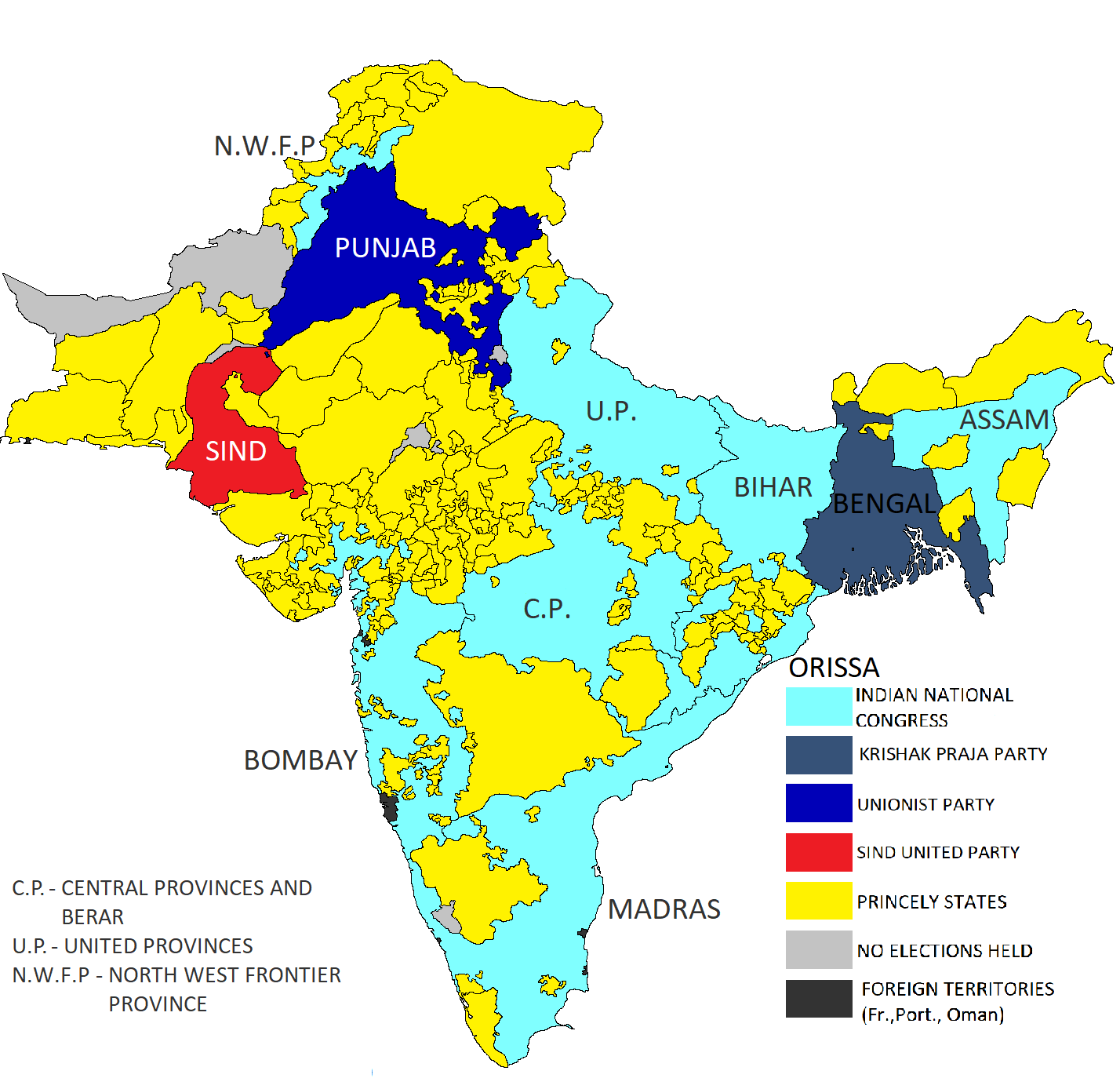

Provincial elections were held in British India in the winter of 1936–37 as mandated by the Government of India Act 1935. Elections were held in all eleven gubernatorial provinces - Madras, Central Provinces, Bihar, Orissa, United Provinces, Bombay, Assam, North-West Frontier Province, Bengal, Punjab and Sind. No elections were held in the British provinces of Delhi, Ajmer-Merwara, Coorg & Baluchistan and in the princely states.

The final results of the elections were declared on 20 February 1937. The Indian National Congress emerged in power in five of the provinces, Bombay, Madras, the Central Provinces, the United Provinces, the North-West Frontier Province, Bihar, and Orissa. The exceptions were Punjab, Sindh (where it failed to obtain majority), Assam & Bengal (where it was nevertheless the single-largest party). The All-India Muslim League failed to form the government in any province on its own.

The Congress ministries resigned in October and November 1939, in protest against Viceroy Lord Linlithgow's action of declaring India to be a belligerent in the Second World War without consulting the elected representatives of the Indian population.

== Electorate ==
Although the Congress's demands of universal adult franchise were not met, the Government of India Act 1935 did increase the number of enfranchised people, on the recommendations of the Lothian Committee Report of 1932 headed by Lord Lothian, the Under-Secretary of State for India alongside those of the Viceroy's cabinet & provincial governments.

Approximately 30 million people, among them some women, gained voting rights. This number constituted one-sixth of Indian adults. The Act provided for a limited adult franchise based on property qualifications such as land ownership and rent, and therefore favored landholders and richer farmers in rural areas. The eligibility criteria differed significantly across the states, according to their conditions.

Muslims had been given separate electorates by the Government of India Act 1909. This was extended to include Sikhs, Europeans & Anglo-Indians by the Government of India Act 1919. The Communal Award, declared in 1932 by the British Prime Minister Ramsay MacDonald, & incorporated into the 1935 Act, extended the separate electorates to include Christians, Backward Tribes, women & special interest groups (business representatives, labour representatives, landholders & university constituencies). Women's suffrage activist Eleanor Rathbone successfully led a campaign for the inclusion of wives and widows of men qualified to vote into the electoral roll, alongside educated women. An attempt to create a separate electorate for Dalits was thwarted by the Poona Pact.

== Legislative Assemblies ==
Legislative Assemblies

| Province | Total | Hindu | Muslim | Others | Women | Christian | Anglo-Indian | European | Commerce | Landholders | Labour | Universities |
|---|---|---|---|---|---|---|---|---|---|---|---|---|
| Assam | 108 | 47 (inclusive of 7 reserved for Dalits) | 34 | 9 (Backward Tribes) | 1 | 1 | 0 | 1 | 11 | 0 | 4 | 0 |
| Bengal | 250 | 78 (66 rural & 12 urban, inclusive of 30 reserved for Dalits) | 117 (111 rural & 6 urban) | 0 | 4 (2 Hindu & 2 Muslim) | 2 | 4 | 11 | 19 | 5 | 8 | 2 (Calcutta University & Dhaka University) |
| Bihar | 152 | 93 (88 rural & 5 urban, inclusive of 15 reserved for Dalits) | 39 (34 rural & 5 urban) | 0 | 4 (3 Hindu & 1 Muslim) | 1 | 1 | 2 | 4 | 4 | 3 | 1 (Patna University) |
| Bombay | 175 | 115 (101 rural & 14 urban, inclusive of 15 reserved for Dalits) | 29 (23 rural & 6 urban) | 0 | 6 (4 Hindu urban, 1 Muslim urban & 1 Hindu rural) | 3 (2 rural & 1 urban) | 2 | 3 | 7 | 2 | 7 | 1 (Bombay University) |
| Central Provinces | 113 | 84 (74 rural & 10 urban, inclusive of 20 reserved for Dalits) | 14 (12 rural & 2 urban) | 1 (Backward Tribes) | 3 (Hindu) | 0 | 1 | 2 | 2 | 3 | 2 | 1 (Nagpur University) |
| Madras | 215 | 146 (131 rural & 15 urban, inclusive of 30 reserved for Dalits) | 28 (26 rural & 2 urban) | 1 (Backward Tribes) | 8 (3 Hindu urban, 3 Hindu rural, 1 Muslim urban & 1 Christian urban) | 8 | 2 | 3 | 6 | 6 | 6 | 1 (Madras University) |
| North West Frontier Province | 50 | 9 (6 rural & 3 urban) | 36 (33 rural & 3 urban) | 3 (Sikhs) | 0 | 0 | 0 | 0 | 0 | 2 | 0 | 0 |
| Orissa | 60 | 45 (inclusive of 6 reserved for Dalits) | 4 | 4 (nominated members) | 2 (Hindu) | 1 | 0 | 0 | 1 | 2 | 1 | 0 |
| Punjab | 175 | 42 (34 rural & 8 urban, inclusive of 8 reserved for Dalits) | 84 (75 rural & 9 urban) | 31 (29 Sikh rural & 2 Sikh urban) | 4 (2 Muslim, 1 Hindu & 1 Sikh) | 2 | 1 | 1 | 1 | 5 | 3 | 1 (University of the Punjab) |
| Sind | 60 | 18 (15 rural & 3 urban) | 33 (31 rural & 2 urban) | 0 | 2 (1 Hindu urban & 1 Muslim urban) | 0 | 0 | 2 | 2 | 2 | 1 | 0 |
| United Provinces | 228 | 140 (123 rural & 17 urban, inclusive of 20 reserved for Dalits) | 64 (51 rural & 13 urban) | 0 | 6 (3 Hindu rural, 1 Hindu urban, 1 Muslim rural & 1 Muslim urban) | 2 | 1 | 2 | 3 | 6 | 3 | 1 (Lucknow University) |
| Total | 1586 | 817 (inclusive of 151 reserved for Dalits) | 468 | 49 (34 Sikh, 11 Backward Tribes & 4 nominated) | 40 (28 Hindu, 10 Muslim, 1 Christian & 1 Sikh) | 20 | 12 | 27 | 56 | 37 | 38 | 8 |

== Legislative Councils ==
Legislative Councils

| Province | Hindu | Muslim | European | Others | Total |
|---|---|---|---|---|---|
| Assam | 10 | 6 | 2 | 0 | 18 |
| Bengal | 10 (8 rural & 2 urban) | 17 (16 rural & 1 urban) | 3 | 27 (elected by MLAs) | 57 |
| Bihar | 9 | 4 | 1 | 14 (elected by MLAs) | 28 |
| Bombay | 20 | 5 | 1 | 0 | 26 |
| Madras | 35 | 7 | 1 | 3 (Christian) | 46 |
| United Provinces | 34 (29 rural & 5 urban) | 17 (12 rural & 5 urban) | 1 | 0 | 52 |
| Total | 118 | 56 | 9 | 44 | 227 |

== Schedule ==
Source
| Province | Polling begins | Polling ended |
|---|---|---|
| Assam | 18 January | 8 February |
| Bengal | 18 January | 26 January |
| Bihar | 22 January | 28 January |
| Bombay | 11 February | 18 February |
| Central Provinces | 4 February | 19 February |
| Madras | 15 February | 20 February |
| North West Frontier Province | 1 February | 1 February |
| Orissa | 20 January | 27 January |
| Punjab | 18 January | 3 February |
| Sind | 1 February | 1 February |
| United Provinces | 7 February | 18 February |

== Election campaign ==
=== Indian National Congress ===
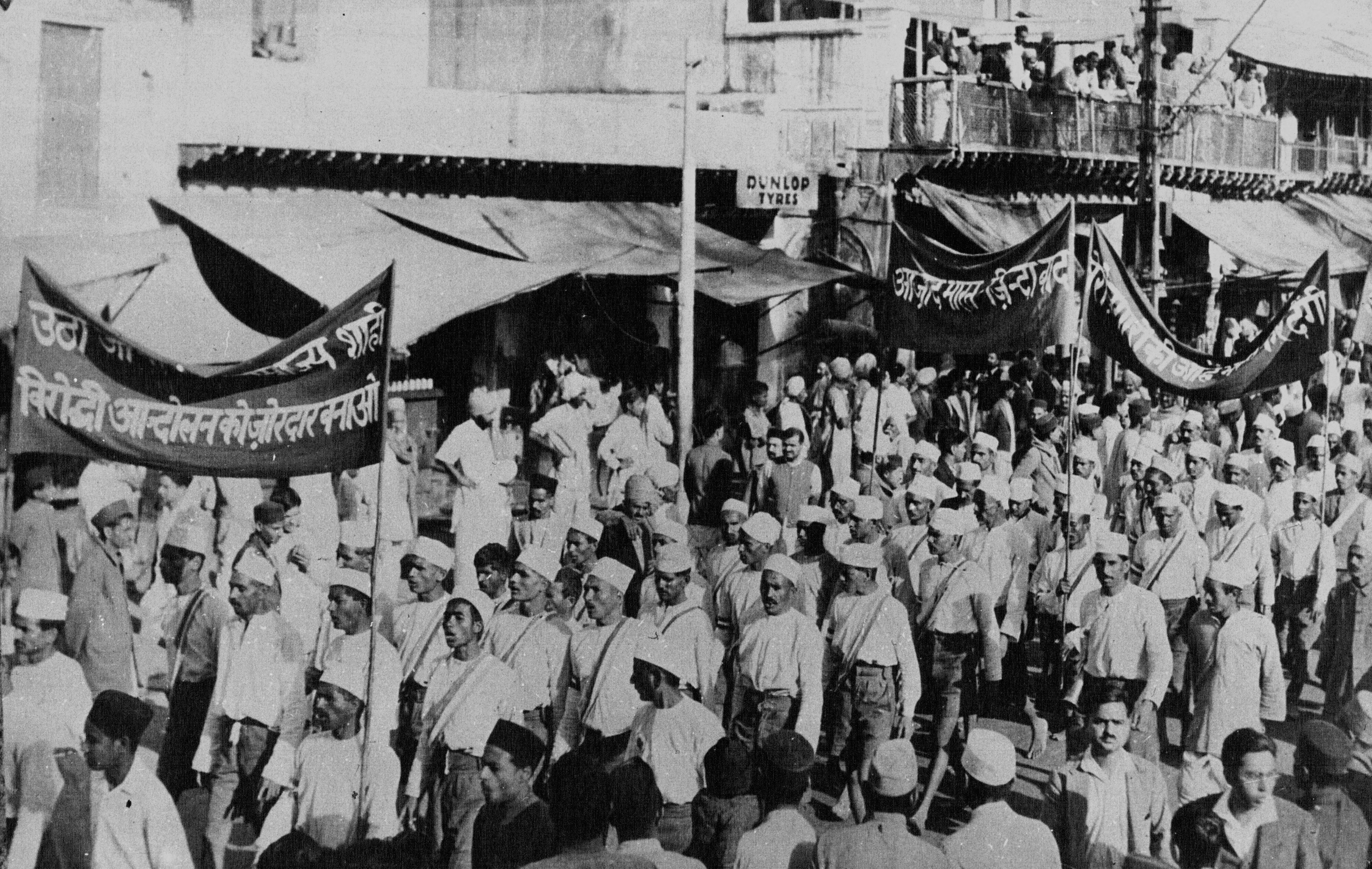
A Congress rally in 1937.

Having adopted the resolution of Purna Swaraj at the 1929 Lahore session & conducting the civil disobedience movement beginning with the Salt Satyagraha under the leadership of Gandhi, the Congress adopted a new constitution in 1934 & participated in general elections held that year. The widespread reception of the civil disobedience movement by the masses and Congress's foray into electoral politics largely alienated it from other political parties of the country (with which it had allied up in the 1928 All Parties Conference), who were alarmed at the Congress adopting an increasing confrontational & majoritarian stance. Previously the Congress had refused to participate in the electoral systems created by the 1909 & 1919 Acts, which saw the creation of the breakaway parties like the Indian Liberal Party headed by Surendranath Banerjee, Swaraj Party headed by Chittaranjan Das & Responsive Cooperation Party headed by M. R. Jayakar made up of Congressmen that participated in elections, but these parties went into dissolution with the Congress's participation in elections. The Congress had also boycotted 2 out of the 3 Round Table Conferences that had been attended by its competitors like the Hindu Mahasabha, Muslim League & Akali Dal. The Congress consistently refused to acknowledge the relevance of these parties, with Gandhi, as the sole Congress representative in the 2nd Round Table Conference, declaring the Congress to be the sole legitimate representatives of all Indians, irrespective of religion & caste - a claim that was widely denounced by many Indians. Despite having boycotted the last Round Table Conference, the Congress at its 1936 Lucknow session, agreed to contest the provincial elections to be held in 1937. The Congress's refusal to oppose the Communal Award saw the creation of Congress Nationalist Party by Madhav Shrihari Aney, made up of Congress dissidents resenting its ideological rigidity.

The Congress at this point acted as a federation of its state units, all of which acted in a largely autonomous manner. Factionalism was rife within the Congress party as a whole. Although Gandhi had largely retired from active political participation at this time and focused on social activities like conducting relief work at the 1934 Bihar earthquake, campaigning against untouchability and setting up the All-India Village Industries Association from his ashram at Wardha, his influence remained strong within the Congress party as the ultimate arbitrator in times of crisis, a mass leader during agitations & through his followers like Rajendra Prasad, Vallabhbhai Patel, C. Rajagopalachari & Abul Kalam Azad, who dominated the core Congress bodies like the All India Congress Committee & the Congress Working Committee. Apart from this Gandhian faction, there also existed another faction, led by the likes of Govind Ballabh Pant, Mukhtar Ahmed Ansari and Asaf Ali, composed mostly of new members who began their political activity after the non-cooperation movement as members of the aforementioned Congress breakaway parties but joined the Congress after the civil disobedience movement. They were Gandhian in ideology but didn't endorse the skepticism towards electoral politics & abstentionist stance of the Gandhian faction. There also existed a Hindu nationalist faction headed by Madanmohan Malaviya (as the Congress at this time didn't bar its members from having simultaneous membership of the Hindu Mahasabha) which supported electoral participation & government formation and a socialist faction represented by the Congress Socialist Party headed by Sampurnanand, & some individual radicals like Subhashchandra Bose & Shardulsingh Kavishar, supporting participation in elections but opposed to government formation. Jawaharlal Nehru, although adhering to Fabian socialism, didn't openly affiliate himself with this socialist group, choosing instead to work with the Gandhian establishment.

Increase in membership of the Congress party following the civil-disobedience movement hastened factionalism within state & district units. A notable example was seen in the Bengal unit, where the left-wingers headed by Bose were locked in a power struggle with the Gandhians led by Dr. Bidhan Chandra Roy, with Bose emerging victorious with the appointment of his brother Saratchandra Bose as the state Congress president. In Bombay, Jayakar and N. C. Kelkar formed the Democratic Swarajya Party due to resentment against the dominance of Gujaratis like Patel, K. M. Munshi & Bhalubhai Desai over Marathis like Shankarrao Deo in the state unit. The Assam unit was plagued with conflict between Sylheti Bengalis led by Basantakumar Das & the Assamese led by Gopinath Bordoloi. In Central Provinces, the Congress unit was divided between its Marathi unit divided between followers of N. B. Khare (who also happened to be a Hindu nationalist) & T. Poonamchand Ranka and the Hindi unit, divided between Ravishankar Shukla & Dwarkaprasad Mishra groups. The Orissa unit was divided between a Gandhian Karan faction centered around Cuttack & Balasore led by Harekrushna Mahatab & a Puri based Brahmin group in support of electoral politics led by Nilkantha Das. The Punjab unit was divided between Satyapal & Gopichand Bhargava factions. The Sindh unit was divided between the Karachi-based Swami Govindanand faction & the Amil-supported Jairamdas Daulatram faction.

The Congress didn't publish a formal election manifesto, but its 1931 Karachi Resolution acted as one.

=== All India Muslim League ===
The Muslim League at this point, consisted of mostly rich, educated and powerful Muslim urban middle class, merchants & landlords who had risen through the government ranks following the elections held after the 1919 Act. By this time, authority of the League had been firmly consolidated under Muhammad Ali Jinnah, having overcome the split caused by Mian Muhammad Shafi. However, its power as a nationwide political party was very weak, with provincial Muslim Leagues & leaders in their individual capacities exercising more power than the party. Although Muslims had actively supported the Congress during the Khilafat movement, but by the time of the elections, the Congress had almost entirely lost its Muslim support base (except in the North West Frontier Province, due to the Khudai Khidmatgar movement) due to resentment over Gandhi unilaterally halting the movement over the Chaurichaura incident, the Congress's decision to boycott the 1920 elections, controversy over the usage of Vande Mataram by the Congress in its 1923 Kakinada session, rejection of the 1923 Bengal Pact, rejection of separate electorates for Muslims in the 1928 Nehru Report & increasing anti-Muslim rhetoric among Hindus following the Malabar rebellion, controversy around the Rangila Rasul & the outbreak of sporadic communal clashes all over the nation throughout the 1920s & early 1930s over issues like public cow slaughter during Bakrid & playing of music by Hindu processions passing by mosques. By this time, many Muslim leaders had distanced themselves away from the party (except for a handful like Azad, Rafi Ahmed Kidwai & Tassaduq Ahmed Khan Sherwani). Jinnah took a nationalist stance and emulated the Congress's electoral campaign and appointed Muslim League Parliamentary Boards for the 1937 elections. Through this, he expected to advance the party as a coalition partner for the Congress, which they might need to form provincial governments. He miscalculated that the separate electorates system, with a larger electorate, would produce good results for the Muslim League. He also undertook countrywide tours in order to unite various Muslim leaders & influential members of the Muslim society under the Muslim League, but failed to do so due their vested interests. The Jamiat-e-Ulema-i-Hind, the country premier organisation of Muslim clerics, remained neutral towards the Muslim League. Jinnah held talks with Rajendra Prasad at Delhi in February 1935 over dropping separate electorates in exchange of joint electorates but at the cost of securing reservation of seats for Muslims in Bengal & Punjab, but it fell apart. Jinnah's campaign was based on Muslim nationalism & communal issues like the Shahidganj dispute & promotion of Urdu (see Hindi-Urdu controversy) but avoided intra-communal polarising issues like the status of Ahmaddiyas (which was the campaign issue for the Majlis-e-Ahrar) or giving the ulema any say in policymaking. The Muslim League's support in rural areas independent of zamindari support or among the workers and small traders in cities was non-existent. Here it faced challenge from various regional Muslim parties composed of former Khilafat activists opposed to the Muslim League due to personal or ideological reasons.

=== Akhil Bharatiya Hindu Mahasabha ===
The Hindu Mahasabha, in its 1935 Poona session & 1936 Lahore session, decided to participate in the elections & government formation. Representing Hindu mercantile community & upper-caste landlords, it derived its strength following the Congress's refusal to condemn the Mappila Muslim perpetrators of the Malabar rebellion, Gandhi's refusal to condemn the assassination of Arya Samaj activist Swami Shraddhanand by Muslims because of his campaign of reconverting Hindus forcibly converted to Islam (which the Muslims interpreted as promoting apostasy) & collapse of Hindu-Muslim unity by the 1920s & 1930s. It campaigned over issues like Hindu nationalism, regionalism, opposition to reservation for backward castes & non-Hindus in government bodies and implementation of reactionary policies. However, it was divided into a pro-Congress faction headed by Malaviya & an anti-Congress faction headed by Ganpat Rai & Padmaraj Jain. Like the Congress, the Hindu Mahasabha also acted as a federation of autonomous provincial Hindu Sabhas. While in the Central Legislative Assembly, the Congress parliamentarians were willing to cooperate with the Hindu Mahasabha member Bhai Parmanand, Nehru was outright opposed to it. The Hindu Mahasabha held talks with the Congress Nationalist Party (of which Malaviya was a key member) & the Democratic Swarajya Party (as it adhered to a model of Hindu nationalism espoused by Bal Gangadhar Tilak) over fielding a common candidate & even a possible merger, but it ultimately failed. It was a significant player in the Muslim-majority provinces of Bengal, Punjab, Sindh & North-West Frontier Province. A major campaign issue of the Hindu Mahasabha was the Congress's neutrality towards the Communal Award, in which Muslim seats in Muslim majority provinces were designated on the basis of actual population ratios based on the 1931 census report but Muslim seats in Hindu-majority provinces were allotted on the basis of a negotiated ratio with favourable weightage towards the Muslims as determined in the 1916 Lucknow Pact, alongside the British government partially conceding to Jinnah's 14 Points by separating the Muslim-majority Sindh from the larger Hindu majority Bombay & upgrading Muslim-majority NWFP from a Chief Commissioner's Province to a gubernatorial province.

=== Communist Party of India ===
The Communist Party of India didn't participate in the elections as it was banned as a political outfit by the British authorities following the 1929 Meerut conspiracy & the party saw the electoral system as a whole to be a bourgeois setup. However, its peasant wing, the All India Kisan Sabha, derived significant influence in the rural areas from its campaign on agrarian distress. Many Kisan Sabha leaders, like N. G. Ranga & Sahajanand Saraswati, held Congress membership and had close contacts with the socialist faction of the Congress & with Nehru. Its trade wing, the All India Trade Union Congress, also exerted a considerable amount of influence among the trade unions. The AIKS extended its support to the Congress in the elections.

=== Other parties ===
Landlords also stood as candidates in the rural seats apart from landholders' seats (as ownership of land in the constituency was a criterion for candidature), campaigning over issues of rural development like irrigation, education & co-operative finances. They favoured cooperation with the British & opposed change in tenancy rights which affected their social & economic status. Landlord parties like the Muslim Independent Party in Bihar, Khoti Sabha in Bombay & National Agriculturist Party in United Provinces acted as mere legislative groupings meant to serve the vested interests of its members than a political party with a definite political agenda. Some members of these landlord parties also held simultaneous membership of communalist groups like the Hindu Mahasabha & the Muslim League.

The Unionist Party of Punjab, although dominated by landlords, campaigned on the urban-rural divide & over the Land Alienation Act, thereby attracting a large following of the peasantry across religious lines. The dominance of Punjabi Muslim landlords in the Unionist Party was challenged by the Hindu Election Board of the veteran Punjabi Hindu politician Raja Narendra Nath wui was closely associated the Hindu Mahasabha & supported by urban Hindu mercantile groups.

The Krishak Praja Party of Bengal, was a tenant party, in that its campaign issues were the abolition of zamindari system & wealth inequality between the rural peasantry & the urban bhadralok, which assumed a communal turn as most of the zamindars & educated gentry in the Muslim-majority region of eastern Bengal happened to be Hindus, where they acted as a dominant minority.

Resentment against the dominance of Brahmins in public life and within the Congress saw the formation of caste-based outfits like the Non-Brahman Party in Bombay, patronized by Chhatrapati Shahu of Kolhapur & the Justice Party in Madras. The Non-Brahman party suffered from caste rivalry between the Kunbis & the Lingayats & lost support to the non-Brahman Congress leaders like K. M. Jedhe & A. B. Latthe. The Justice Party which once dominated Madras politics, suffered from its record of despotism while in office, caste infighting like those between Kammas & Reddys, infighting among its members like the clash between the Raja of Bobbili & the Raja of Pithapuram (who formed the People's Party in response) and loss of non-Brahman support following the election of C. N. Muthuranga Mudaliar as state Congress president. Many of these parties were also dominated by landholders & campaigned on issues of rural development. The Parsi community of Bombay, put off by the socialist leanings of the Congress, joined the Non-Brahman party (although some like Khurshed Nariman remained with the Congress) and stood as candidates in Hindu seats. In addition to this, there were also Dalit based parties, like the Depressed Classes League in Bihar, the Satnami Mahasabha in Central Provinces, & the Independent Labour Party of Dr. B. R. Ambedkar, campaigning for Dalit interests. However, outside of Bombay the Independent Labour Party support was largely confined to the Mahar community & failed to attract the support of other Dalit groups like the Chamars. Dalit leaders like Jagjivan Ram & the Harijan Sevak Sangh also played a crucial role in consolidation of Dalit support for the Congress.

The Shiromani Akali Dal in Punjab campaigned on grounds of Sikh interests, but suffered a split with the emergence of the Sikh landlord based Khalsa National Party. The Congress was unable to obtain much Sikh support due to its neutrality to the Communal Award, which both Sikh parties vehemently opposed.

Due to restrictions over finance & campaigning, the personal connection of the candidate with the electorate assumed far greater importance than party affiliation. Zamindars participating from rural constituencies relied on the influence among their tenants. Caste & community consolidation also played a crucial factor alongside the reputation & history of personal political activism of the candidate. Most of the non-partisan press of India were sympathetic to the Congress, except for those operated by Anglo-Indians & Europeans.

== Results ==
The Congress won 706 out of around 1586 seats in a resounding victory, and went on to form seven provincial governments. The Congress formed governments in United provinces, Bihar, the Central Provinces, Bombay and Madras.

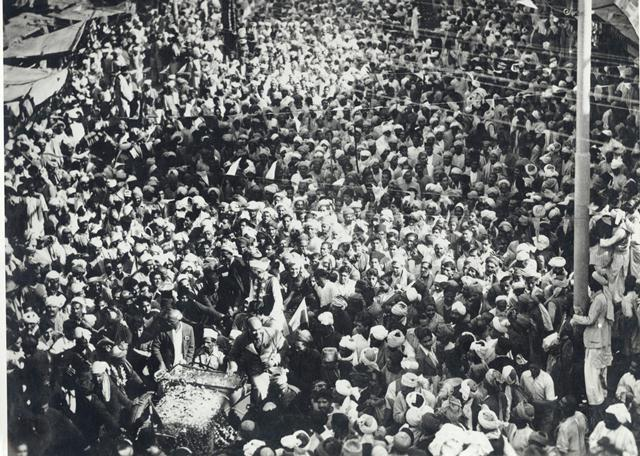
Nehru being felicitated by the masses in a victory rally at Peshawar during his visit in October 1937.

The 1937 elections demonstrated that neither the Muslim League nor the Congress represented Muslims. It also demonstrated the provincial moorings of Muslim politics. The Muslim League captured around 25 percent of the seats reserved for Muslims. The Congress Muslims achieved 6 percent of them. Most of the Muslim seats were won by regional Muslim parties. None of Congress' Muslim candidates won in Sindh, Punjab, Bengal, Orissa, United Provinces, Central Provinces, Bombay and Assam. Most of the 25 Muslim seats the Congress captured were in NWFP, Madras and Bihar.

Legislative assembly results

| Province | Congress | Muslim League | Other parties | Independents | Muslim seats | Total |
|---|---|---|---|---|---|---|
| Assam | 33 | 10 | 5 (Assam Valley Muslim Party) 5 (Surma Valley Muslim Party) 3 (United People's Party) 1 (Krishak Praja Party) | 21 (Hindus) 10 (Muslims) 9 (Backward Tribes) 8 (Commerce) 1 (European) 1 (Christian) 1 (Woman) | 34 | 108 |
| Bengal | 54 | 40 | 36 (Krishak Praja Party) 5 (Tipperah Krishak Samiti) 4 (Hindu Mahasabha) 1 (Congress Nationalist Party) | 42 (Muslims) 37 (Hindus) 14 (Commerce) 11 (Europeans) 4 (Anglo-Indians) 2 (Christians) | 120 | 250 |
| Bihar | 92 | 0 | 16 (Muslim Independent Party) 6 (Muslim United Party) 3 (Majlis-e-Ahrar) 3 (Depressed Classes League) | 15 (Hindus) 11 (Muslims) 2 (Commerce) 2 (Europeans) 1 (Anglo-Indian) 1 (Christian) | 40 | 152 |
| Bombay | 85 | 18 | 13 (Independent Labour Party) 10 (Non-Brahman Party) 3 (Democratic Swarajya Party) 2 (Khoti Sabha) 1 (Congress Nationalist Party) | 18 (Hindus) 13 (Muslims) 4 (Commerce) 3 (Europeans) 2 (Anglo-Indians) 3 (Christians) | 30 | 175 |
| Central Provinces | 70 | 5 | 8 (Muslim Parliamentary Board) 3 (Independent Labour Party) 3 (Non-Brahman Party) 2 (Congress Nationalist Party) 1 (Hindu Mahasabha) | 13 (Hindus) 1 (Muslim) 2 (Europeans) 1 (Anglo-Indian) | 14 | 113 |
| Madras | 159 | 9 | 21 (Justice Party) 1 (People's Party) 1 (Muslim Progressive Party) | 7 (Hindus) 7 (Muslims) 4 (Commerce) 3 (Europeans) 2 (Anglo-Indians) 1 (Christian) | 29 | 215 |
| North West Frontier Province | 19 | 0 | 21 (Muslim Independent Party) 7 (Hindu-Sikh Nationalist Party) | 2 (Muslims) 1 (Hindu) | 36 | 50 |
| Orissa | 36 | 0 | 6 (United Party) 4 (National Party) | 6 (Hindus) 4 (Nominated) 3 (Muslims) 1 (Christian) | 4 | 60 |
| Punjab | 18 | 2 | 94 (Unionist Party) 14 (Khalsa National Party) 11 (Hindu Election Board) 10 (Shiromani Akali Dal) 2 (Majlis-e-Ahrar) 2 (Majlis-e-Ittehad-e-Millat) 1 (Congress Nationalist Party) 1 (Socialist Party) | 11 (Hindus) 5 (Muslims) 3 (Sikhs) 1 (Labour) | 86 | 175 |
| Sind | 7 | 0 | 17 (Sind United Party) 16 (Sindh Muslim League) 12 (Hindu Mahasabha) 1 (Sind Azad Party) | 3 (Hindus) 2 (Europeans) 1 (Muslim) 1 (Commerce) | 34 | 60 |
| United Provinces | 133 | 27 | 22 (National Agriculturist Party) 1 (Liberal Party) | 30 (Muslims) 10 (Hindus) 2 (Europeans) 2 (Christians) 1 (Anglo-Indian) | 65 | 228 |
| Total | 706 (including 25 seats reserved for Muslims) | 111 | 398 (including 236 Muslim representatives from parties other than the Congress & the Muslim League) | 367 (including 125 Muslims) | 468 | 1586 |

=== MLAs elected ===
| Province | Members |
|---|---|
| Assam | Kumar Ajitnarayan Deb of Sidli, Akshaykumar Das, Arunkumar Chanda, Baidyanath Mukherjee, Balaram Sarkar, Basantakumar Das, Beliram Das, Bhubanchandra Gogoi, Bipinchandra Medhi, Dakshinaranjan Gupta Choudhury, Debeshwar Sarma, Ghanashyam Das, Gaurikanta Talukdar, Gopinath Bordoloi, Haladhar Bhuyan, Harendranarayan Choudhury, Hirendrachandra Chakraborty, Jadavprasad Chaliha, Jogendrachandra Nath, Jogendranarayan Mandal, Jogendranath Barua, Jogeshchandra Gohain, Kalachand Roy, Kameshwar Das, Kaminikumar Sen, Karunasindhu Roy, Kedarmal Brahman, Krishnanath Sarma, Lakshesvar Barua, Lalitmohan Kar, Mahadev Sarma, Dr. Mahendranath Saikia, Mahichandra Bora, Nabakumar Dutta, Amiyakumar Das, Paramananda Das, Ray Bahadur Pramodchandra Dutta, Purandar Sarma, Purnachandra Sarma, Rajanikanta Barua, Ramnath Das, Sir Rohinikumar Choudhury, Shankarchandra Barua, Rajendranath Barua, Santoshkumar Barua, Sarveshwar Barua, Shibendrachandra Biswas, Siddhinath Sarma, Bhairabchandra Das, Bideshi Pan Tanti, Binodkumar J. Sarwan, Dhirsingh Deuri, Karka Dalay Miri, Khorsingh Terang Mauzadar, P. Parida, Rabichandra Kachari, Rupnath Brahma, Abdul Aziz, Abdul Bari Choudhury, Maulana Abdul Hamid Khan, Khan Bahadur Haji Abdul Majid Choudhury, Abdul Matin, Abdur Rahman, Syed Abdur Rouf, Mohammad Abdus Salam, Dewan Mohammad Ahbab Choudhury, Mohammad Ali Haider Khan, Dewan Ali Raja, Muhammad Amiruddin, Muhammad Amjad Ali, Ashrafuddin Muhammad Choudhury, Badaruddin Ahmed, Khan Bahadur Dewan Eklimur Roza, Fakhruddin Ali Ahmed, Ghyasuddin Ahmed, Jahanuddin Ahmed, Khan Bahadur Keramat Ali, Muhammad Maqbul Hussain, Khan Bahadur Mahmud Ali, Matiur Rahman Mia, Mubarak Ali, Khan Sahib Mudabbir Hussain Choudhury, Khan Bahadur Mufizur Rahman, Munawwar Ali, Muzarraf Ali Laskar, Namwar Ali Barbhuiya, Naziruddin Ahmed, Sheikh Osman Ali Sadagar, Saiyid Sir Muhammad Saadulah, Khan Sahib Sayidur Rahman, Shamsul Ulema Abu Nasr Mohammad Waheed, Benjamin Ch. Momin, Rev J. J. M. Nichols Roy, Rev L. Gatphoh, Colonel A. B. Beddow, A. F. Bendall, J. R. Clayton, W. R. Faull, W. Fleming, B. I. Barry, F. W. Hockenhull, D. B. H. Moore, R. A. Palmer, Miss Mavis Dunn Lyngdoh |
| Bengal | Sir Khwaja Nazimuddin, M. A. H. Ispahani, Khwaja Nooruddin, Muhammad Solaiman, H. S. Suhrawardy, Nawab Bahadur Khwaja Habibullah of Dhaka, Abul Hashim, Abdur Rashid, Dr. Syed Muhammad Siddique, Khan Bahadur Alfazuddin Ahmed, Abdul Qasem, Khan Sahib Syed Abdur Rauf, Jashimuddin Ahmed, Quara Yusuf Mirza, Khan Bahadur A. F. M. Abdur Rahman, Shamsuddin Ahmed, Muhammad Mohsin Ali, Aftab Hossain Joardar, Khan Bahadur Azizul Huq, Abdul Bari, Sahibzada Kawan Jah Syed Kazim Ali Mirza (son of Wasif Ali Mirza), Muhammad Farhad Raza Choudhury, Syed Nausher Ali, Waliur Rahman, Serajul Islam, Khan Sahib Ahmed Ali Enayetpuri, Abdul Hakeem, Syed Jalaluddin Hashemi, Syed Mustagaswal Haq, Ashraf Ali Khan Choudhury, Maniruddin Akhund, Muhammad Amir Ali Mia, Moslem Ali Mollah, Mafizuddin Choudhury, Hafiuddin Choudhury, Abdul Jabbar, Khan Bahadur Mehtabuddin Ahmed, Nawab Bahadur Mossharaf Hossain Khan, Khan Bahadur A. M. L. Rahman, Haji Safiruddin Ahmed, Shah Abdur Rauf, Kazi Emdadul Haq, Abdul Hafiz, Abu Hossain Sarkar, Ahmed Hossain, Rajibuddin Tarafdar, Muhammad Ishaque, Dr. Mafizuddin Ahmed, Khan Bahadur Muhammad Ali, Azhar Ali, A. M. Abdul Hamid, Abdul Rashid Mahmud, Abdullah al-Mahmud, Muhammad Barat Ali, Zahur Ahmed Choudhury, Idris Ahmed Mia, Khwaja Shahabuddin, Abdul Aziz, S. A. Salim, Mohammad Abdul Hakim Bikrampuri, Razaur Rahman Khan, Aulad Hossain Khan, Abdul Latif Biswas, Muhammad Abdus Shaheed, Khan Bahadur Syed Abdul Hafiz, Fazlul Rahman, Muhammad Abdul Jabbar Palowan, Giasuddin Ahmed, Abdul Karim, Abdul Majid, Abdul Wahed, Maulana Shamsul Huda, Abdul Hakim, Masud Ali Khan Panni, Mirza Abdul Hafiz, Syed Hasan Ali Choudhury, Khan Sahib Kabiruddin Khan, Abdul Hossain Ahmed, Muhammad Israil, Abdul Hamid Shah, Khan Sahib Hamiduddin Ahmed, Shamsuddin Ahmed Khondkar, Ahmed Ali Mridha, Tamizuddin Khan, Yusuf Ali Choudhury, Muhammad Abul Fazl, Ghiyasuddin Ahmed Choudhury, A. K. Fazlul Huq, Abdul Kader, Khan Sahib Hatem Ali Jamadar, Syed Muhammad Afzal, Khan Bahadur Hashem Ali Khan, Sadaruddin Ahmed, Abdul Wahab Khan, Mohammad Mozammel Huq, Haji Maulvi Tofel Ahmed Choudhury, Dewan Mustafa Ali, Nawabzada Khwaja Nasarullah, Maqbul Hossain, Nawab Mohiuddin Faroqui of Ratanpur (in Comilla), Ramizuddin Ahmed, Asimuddin Ahmed, Muhammad Hasanuzzaman, Janab Ali Majumdar, Khan Bahadur Abidur Reza Choudhury, Shahed Ali, Muhammad Ibrahim, Maulvi Aminullah, Ghulam Sarwar Hussaini, Syed Ahmed Khan, Syed Abdul Majid, Abdur Razzak, Khan Bahadur Jalaluddin Ahmed, Ahmed Kabir Choudhury, Muhammad Maniruzzaman Islamabadi, Al-Haj Maulana Dr. Sanaullah, Khan Bahadur Fazlul Qudir, Abdul Rahman Siddiqi, Aftab Ali, A. M. A. Zaman, Fazlur Rahman, Jatindranath Basu, Santoshkumar Basu, Prabhudayal Himmatsinghka, Dr. J. M. Dasgupta, Jogeshchandra Gupta, Saratchandra Basu, Baradaprasanna Pyne, Tulshichandra Goswami, Ray Harendranath Choudhury, Dr. Nalinaksha Sanyal, Surendramohan Maitra, Birendranath Majumdar, Maharajakumar Udaychand Mahtab of Bardhaman, Pramathanath Banerjee, Dr. Saratchandra Mukherjee, Ashutosh Mullick, Kamalkrishna Roy, Debendralal Khan, Kishoripati Roy, Gobindachandra Bhaumik, Ishwarchandra Mal, Nikunjabihari Maiti, Gourhari Som, Sukumar Dutta, Manmathanath Roy, Ray Bahadur Jogeshchandra Sen, P. Banerjee, Haripada Chattopadhyay, Sasankasekhar Sanyal, Atulkrishna Ghosh, Nisithanath Kundu, Khagendranath Dasgupta, Jatindranath Chakraborty, Narendranarayan Chakraborty, Manoranjan Banerjee, Kiranshankar Roy, Charuchandra Roy, Birendrakishore Roychoudhuri, Surendranath Biswas, Narendra Dasgupta, Jogendranath Mandal, Dhirendranath Dutta, Harendrakumar Sur, Mahimchandra Das, Damber Singh Gurung, Advaitakumar Majhi, Bankubihari Mandal, Dhirendranath Das, Manindrabhushan Singha, Krishnaprasad Mandal, Harendra Dolui, Radhanath Das, Pulinbihari Mullick, Hemchandra Naskar, Anukulchandra Das, Lakshminarayan Biswas, Kiritbhushan Das, Rasiklal Biswas, Mukundabihari Mullick, Patiram Roy, Tarinicharan Pramanik, Premhari Barma, Shyamaprasad Barman, Prasannadeb Raikut, Upendranath Barman, Pushpajit Barma, Kshetranath Singha, Madhusudan Sarkar, Dhananjay Roy, Amritalal Mandal, Monomohan Das, Biratchandra Mandal, Pramatharanjan Thakur, Upendranath Edbar, Jagatchandra Mandal, Sir Harishankar Pal, Naliniranjan Sarkar, Debiprasad Khaitan, Rai Bahadur Manturam Tapuria, Sir Bijoy Prasad Singh Roy, Maharaja Srischandra Nandi of Kashimbazar, Kumar Shibshekhareshwar Roy of Tahirpur, Maharaja Shashikanta Acharya Choudhury of Muktagacha, Ray Bahadur Khirod Chandra Roy, J. N. Gupta, Dr. Sureshchandra Banerjee, Niharendu Dutta Majumdar, Shibnath Banerjee, B. Mukherjee, Shyamaprasad Mukherjee, Litta Munda Sirdar, Dr. H. C. Mukherjee, S. A. Gomes, Hasina Murshed, Begum Farhat Bano Khanam, Mira Dutta Gupta, Hemaprabha Majumdar, Mrs Ellen West, J. W. Chippendale, L. T. Maguire, C. Griffiths, W. L. Armstrong, J. R. Walker, C. S. Maclauchlan, F. C. Brasher, C. Millar, W. W. K. Page, G. Morgan, R. H. Ferguson, W. C. Patton, J. E. Ordish, L. M. Crosfield, Eric Studd, David Henry, I. A. Clark, R. M. Sassoon, A. P. Blair, W. C. Wordsworth, K. A. Hamilton, H. R. Norton, C. G. Cooper, T. B. Nimmo, H. C. Bannerman, C. W. Milks, J. B. Ross |
| Bihar | Sarangdhar Sinha, Jagatnarayan Lal, Vindhyeshwariprasad Varma, Upendranath Mukherjee, Jimutbahan Sen, Indra Dewan Saran Singh, Shyamnandan Sinha, Pandit Shilbhadra Yajee, Ram Prasad, Birendra Bahadur Sinha, Anugrahanarayan Sinha, Jamunaprasad Sinha, Bundi Ram, Jugalkishorenarayan Sinha, Hargobind Mishra, Pandit Gupteshwar Dubey, Harinandan Singh, Budhan Rai Sharma, Jagjivan Ram, Harihar Sinha, Biresh Dutta Sinha, Dwarkanath Tiwari, Narayanprasad Sinha, Shiveshwarprasad Narayan Sinha, Prabhunath Sinha, Pandit Govindpati Tiwari, Ram Besawan Ravidas, Ganesh Prasad, Gorakh Prasad, Harivansh Sahay, Pandit Baidyanath Mishra, Vishwanath Singh, Balgobind Bhagat, Maheshprasad Sinha, Shivanandan Ram, Brijnandan Sahi, Ramdayalu Sinha, Rameshwarprasad Sinha, Dipnarayan Sinha, Thakur Ramnandan Sinha, Ramashish Thakur, Rajendranarayan Choudhury, Chaturanan Das, Jamuna Karjee, Suryanandan Thakur, Keshav Ram, Rajeshwarprasad Narayan Sinha, Ramcharan Sinha, Sundar Mahato, Shrikrishna Sinha, Dr. Raghunandan Prasad, Nirapada Mukherjee, Ramcharitra Singh, Brahmadeonarayan Singh, Kumar Kalikaprasad Singh of Gidhaur, Pandit Mewalal Jha, Shivadhari Singh, Harikishore Prasad, Rajendra Mishra, Shivanandanprasad Mandal, Rambaras Das, Ramdin Tiwari, Kishorilal Kundu, Dhirnarayan Chand, Jaglal Chaudhury, Binodanand Jha, Buddhinath Jha, Bhagabanchandra Das, Charan Murmu, Brijlal Dokania, Debu Murmu, Krishnaballabh Sahay, Hopna Santhal, Sukhlal Singh, Karu Dushadh, Deokinandan Prasad, Ram Bhagat, Baralal Kandarpnath Shah Deo of Palkot, Purnachandra Mitra, Rajkishore Sinha, Jitu Ram, Jadubansh Sahay, Upendramohan Dasgupta, Tikaram Majhi, Kumar Ajitprasad Singh Deo of Panchkote, Gulu Dhopa, Ambikacharan Mullick, Pramatha Bhattashali, Debendranath Samanta, Rasik Ho, Chakreshwar Kumar Jain, Manindranath Mukherjee, Ganesh Dutta Singh, Chandeshwarprasad Narayan Sinha, Suryamohan Thakur, Maharajakumar Rajkishorenath Shah Deo (son of Udaypratapnath Shah Deo), Natha Ram, Harendrabahadur Chandra, Kshetranath Sengupta, Sacchidananda Sinha, Syed Abdul Aziz, Hafiz Zafar Hasan, Abdul Jalil, Khan Bahadur Nawab Abdul Wahab Khan, Syed Mohiuddin Ahmad, Muhammad Yunus, Sharfuddin Hasan, Saiyid Najmul Hasan, Muhammad Latifur Rahman, Chaudhury Sharafat Hussain, Nur Hasan, Muhammad Qasim, Khan Bahadur Saghirul Haq, Syed Mahmud, Muhammad Abdul Majid, Hafiz Sheikh Muhammad Sani, Khan Sahib Muhammad Yaqub, Badrul Hasan, Tajmul Hussain, Muhammad Shafi, Ahmed Ghafoor, Saiyidul Haq, Muhammad Salim, Chaudhury Muhammad Nazirul Hasan, Saiyid Rafiuddin Ahmad Rizvi, Muhammad Mahmud, Syed Muhammad Minnatullah, Sheikh Ziaur Rahman, Zainuddin Hossain Mirza, Sheikh Fazlur Rahman, Muhammad Islamuddin, Sheikh Shafiqul Haq, Muhammad Tahir, Saijid Ali Manzar, Abdul Bari, Abdul Majid, Sheikh Ramzan Ali, Sheikh Muhammad Hussain, Qazi Muhammad Ilyas, Boniface Lakra, Ignace Beck, Kamakhya Devi, Sharadakumari Devi, Saraswati Devi, Lady Anees Imam, A. M. Hayman, E. C. Danry, J. Richmond, W. H. Meyrick, E. A. Paterson |
| Bombay | Jivappa Sudhana Aidale, Dr. Bhimrao Ramji Ambedkar, Dr. Krishnarao Bhimrao Antrolikar, Dattatrey Trimbak Aradhye, Shaligram Ramchandra Bharatiya, Ramkrishna Gangaram Bhatankar, Rajaram Ramji Bhole, Bhaskarrao Bhaurao Chakranarayan, Purushottam Lalji Chauhan, Rao Bahadur Ganesh Krishna Chhale, Anant Vinayak Chitre, Dhanaji Nana Choudhury, Fulsinghji Dhansinghji Dabhi, Vishnu Waman Dandekar, Sir Dimkarrao Narbheram Desai, Gursiddhappa Kadappa Desai, Khandubhai Kasanji Desai, Morarji Ranchhodji Desai, Randhir Prasanvadam Desai, Shankreppagudda Basalingappagouda Desai, Keshav Balwant Deshmukh, Govind Hari Deshpande, Andanappa Jnanappa Doddameti, Kundanmal Sobhachand Firodia, Vinayak Atmram Gadkari, Bhaurao Krishnarao Gaikwad, Maneklal Maganlal Gandhi, Shankar Krishnaji Gavankar, Damji Posala Gavit, Gangadhar Raghoram Ghatge, Champaklal Jaikisandas Ghia, M. G. Ghia, Gulabsingh Bhila Girasey, Ramchandra Bhagawant Girme, Keshav Govind Gokhale, Mahabaleshwar Ganpati Bhatt Gopi, Bhalchandra Maheshwar Gupte, Lingappa Fakirappa Hallikeri, Bhaurao Sakharam Hire, Revappa Somappa Holer, Daulatrao Gulaji Jadhav, Tulsidas Subhanrao Jadhav, Dadasaheb Khaserao Jagtap, Parappa Chambasappa Jakati, Jinabhai Parvatishankar Joshi, Narayanrao Gururao Joshi, Vishwanathrao Narayanrao Jog, Rao Sahib Annappa Narayan Kalyani, Siddhappa Totappa Kambli, Shivram Lakshman Karandikar, Ramchandra Krishna Karavade, Shripad Shyamaji Kariguddi, Appaji Yashwantrao Kate, Bhagwan Shambhuppa Kathale, Sheshgiri Narayanrao Keshwain, Ramchandra Annaji Khedgikar, Bal Gangadhar Kher, Bhawanji A. Khimji, Dattatrey Kashinath Kunte, Bhogilal Dhirajlal Lala, Lalchand Hirachand, Anna Babaji Latthe, Maganlal Nagindas, Ramchandra Narayan Mandlik, Namdeorao Buddhajirao Marathe, Rajmal Lakhichand Marwadi, Nagindas Tribhuvandas Master, Ganesh Vasudev Mavalankar, Hariprasad Pitambar Mehta, Jamnadas Madhavji Mehta, Morarbhai Kasanji, Jayavant Ghanshyam More, Wamanrao Mukadam, Kanaiyalal Maneklal Munshi, Vasant Narayan Naik, Girimalappa Rachappa Nalwadi, Gulzarilal Nanda, Rao Bahadur Namdeo Eknath Navle, Timappa Rudrappa Nesvi, Prithvichand Amolakchand Nimani, Shamrao Vishnu Parulekar, Hari Vinayak Pataskar, Babubhai Jasbai Patel, Bhailabhai Bhaikhabhai Patel, Mangesh Patel, Atmaram Nana Patil, Gambhirrao Avachitrao Patil, Kallangouda Siddhagouda Patil, Lakshman Govind Patil, Lakshman Madhav Patil, Malgouda Pungouda Patil, Narhar Rajaram Patil, Sadashiv Ranoji Patil, Shankargouda Timmagouda Patil, Vitthal Nathu Patil, Ganesh Krishna Phadke, Chhotalal Balkrishna Purani, Rao Sahib Babajirao Rane, Bachajee Ramchandra Rane, Dattatrey Waman Raut, Prabhakar Janardan Roham, Sakarlal Balbhai, Shankar Hari Sathe, Khanderao Sakharam Savant, Kanji Govind Sheth, Bajirao Jagdeorao Shinde, Panduram Keshav Shiralkar, Lakshmidas Mangaldas Shrikant, Savalram Gundaji Songavkar, Murigappa Sidhappa Sugandhi, Kamalaji Ragho Talkar, Balvantrai Parmadrai Thakore, Rao Sahib Bhausaheb Thorat, Rao Bahadur Vitthalrao Lakshmanrao Thube, Hari Vitthal Thulpule, Bhaijibhai Ukhabhai Vaghela, Balwant Hanmant Varale, Govind Dharmaji Vartak, Sardar Narayanrao Ganpatrao Vinchurkar, Ishvarlal Kalidas Vyas, Purushottam Vasudeo Wagh, Balaji Bhawansa Walvekar, Dattatrey Nathoba Wandekhar, Baronet Sir Girijaprasad Chinubhai Madhavlal, Khan Bahadur Ali Bahadur, Khan Bahadur Haji Hajrat Abdul Latif, Hussain Abubakr Beg Muhammad, Khan Sahib Abdullah Haji Isa Bhagat, Ismail Ibrahim Chundrigar, Sir Ali Muhammad Khan Dehlavi, Khan Sahib Faiz Muhammad Khan Mohabbat Khan, Asmal Musa Abhram, Abdul Majid Abdul Khadar Gheewale, Khan Sahib Abdul Hakim Babu Hakim, Abdur Karim Aminsab Hanagi, Sheikh Muhammad Hasan, Allisa Nabisa Ilkar, Khalilullah Abasaheb Janvekar, Muhammad Amin Jitekar, Khan Sahib Haji Ahmad Kasam Kacchi, Khwaja Bashiruddin Kazi, Aziz Gafur Kazi, Muhammad Musa Qilledar, Muhammad Ali Allah Baksh, Akhtar Hasan Mirza, Muhammad Suleiman Kassam Mitha, Muhammad Yasin Nuri, Musaji Yusufji Patel, Muhammad Bawa Patel, Khan Bahadur Sardar Haji Amirsaheb Mohiuddin Sahib Raees, Sardar Mehbub Ali Khan Akbar Khan Savanur, Khan Bahadur Sheikh Jan Muhammad Haji Sheikh Kalla, Ismail Hassan Bapu Siddiq, Ahmed Ebrahim Singapori, K. F. Nariman, Dhanjishah Bomanji Cooper, Manchershah Dhanjibhoy Gilder, Shavaksha Hormusji Jhabvala, Sorabji Dorabji Saklatvala (brother of Sapurji Saklatvala), Annapurna Gopal Deshmukh, Vijayagauri Balvantrai Kanuga, Lilavati Kanaiyalal Munshi, Nagamma Veerangouda Patil, Lakshmibai Ganesh Thuse, Salima Faiz Badruddin Tyabji, Sir John Abercromble, Courtney Parker Bramble, Dr. Joseph Altino Collaco, Fred J. Currion, Dominic Joseph Ferreira, Francis Holroy French, Cyril Frederick Golding, G. O. Pike, Stanley Henry Prater, W. W. Russell |
| Central Provinces | Ghanshyam Singh Gupta, Narayan Bhaskar Khare, L. N. Hardas, Chaturbhujbhai Jasani, Khushalchand Ghasiram Khajanchi, Narmadaprasad Mishra, Keshaorao Ramchandrarao Khandekar, Dr. Jagannath Ganpatrao, Pyarelal Singh, Samahajirao V. Gokhale, P. B. Gole, Bajrang Thekkedar, Sitaram Lakshman Patil, Bhikulal Lakshmichand Chandak, A. N. Udhoji, T. J. Kedar, Pukhraj Kochar, Dashrath Lakshman Patil, R. S. Dube, D. B. Khobragade, Nilkanth Yadaorao Deotale, Dharamrao Bhujangrao, Seth Dipchand Lakshmichand, Biharilal Deorao Patel, Gulabchand Choudhury, G. R. Jambholkar, Prabhakar D. Jatar, Durgashankar Kripashankar Mehta, Pandit Dwarkaprasad Mishra, Matua Ghaitu Mehra, Kashiprasad Pande, N. Hanumantha Rao, Jalam Moti, Vasudeorao Venkatrao Subedar, Premshankar Lakshmishankar Dhagat, Bhagirath Rakhan Choudhury, Mahendra Lal, Lalchoodaman Shah, Lala Arjun Singh, Dattatreya Bhikaji Naik, Shankarlal Choudhury, Rameshwar Agnibhoj, Bhagwantrao Annabhau Mandloi, M. R. Majumdar, Anant Ram, Mahant Purandas Suddin Satnami, Mahant Lakshminarayandas Bairagi, Ravishankar Shukla, Mahant Naindas Rajaram Satnami, Jamnalal Tejmal Chopra, E. Raghavendra Rao, Sukrit Das, Ramgopal Tiwari, Muktawandas Ajabdas, Sardar Amarsingh Baijnathsingh Sehgal, Thakur Chhedilal, Bahorik Ledwa Ravidas, M. L. Bakliwal, Posu Satnami, Vishvanathrao Yadaorao Tamaskar, Kanhaiya Lal, Seth Badrinarayan Agarwal, Ganpatrao Pande, Raghoba Gambhira Ghodichore, V. M. Jakatdar, Suganchandra Chunilal, Ramrao Deshmukh, Ganeshrao Ramchandra Deshmukh, Lakshman Narayan Nathe, Ganesh Akaji Gavai, Bhimsingh Govindsingh, Keshao Januji, Umedsingh Narayansingh Thakur, Vithalrao Narayanrao Jamadar, Rao Sahib Dinkarrao Dharrao Rajurkar, Bhimrao Hanmantrao Jatkar, Daulat Kishan Bhagat, Narayan Balaji Bobde, M. P. Kolhe, Pandhari Sitaram Patil, Lakshman Shrawan Bhatkar, Tukaram Shankar Patil, Krishnarao Ganpatrao Deshmukh, Udebhan Shah, Chhaganlal Jaideoprasad Bharuka, Seth Gopaldas Bulakidas Mehta, Beohar Rajendra Sinha, Madhav Gangadhar Chitnavis, R. M. Deshmukh, Ganpati Sadashiv Page, V. R. Kalappa, B. G. Khaparde, Khan Sahib Syed Muzaffar Hussain, Muhammad Mohibbul Huq, Muhammad Yusuf Sharif, Khan Sahib Syed Yasin, Abdul Razak Khan, Iftikhar Ali, Majiduddin Ahmad, Khan Bahadur Syed Hifazat Ali, S. W. A. Rizvi, Mohiuddin Khan, Hidayat Ali, Khan Bahadur Mirza Rahman Beg, Syed Abdul Rauf Shah, Khan Sahib Abdul Rahman Khan, Anasuyabai Kale, Subhadrakumari Chauhan, Durgabai Joshi, Rev. G. C. Rogers, L. H. Bartlett |
| Madras | B. Sambamurti, P. Achuthan, P. M. Adikeshavalu Naicker, B. Anantachariar, N. Annamalai Pillai, H. B. Ari Gouder, Muthu Kr. Ar. Kr. Arunachalam Chettiyar, Adimulam Jamedar, S. S. Balakrishna, M. Bapineedu, M. Bhaktavatsalam, B. Bhaktavatsalu Naidu, K. Bhashyam Aiyangar, Y. V. A. Bhaskara Rao, V. Bhuvarahan, P. Buchappa Naidu, K. Chandramauli, G. Chelvapathi Chetty, O. Chengam Pillai, S. Chidambara Aiyer, P. Chinnamuthu, T. S. Chokhalingam Pillai, M. P. Damodaran, M. Doraikannu, A. R. A. S. Doraiswami Nadar, V. V. Giri, B. Gopala Reddy, Govinda Dass, C. K. Govindan Nayar, V. J. Gupta, S. Guruvulu, N. Halashyam Aiyar, K. Ishwara, D. Kadirappa, K. Venkata Rao, A. Kaleshwara Rao, K. Kamaraja Nadar, E. Kannan, K. R. Karant, A. Karunakaran Menon, K. Kolandavelu Nayanar, K. Koti Reddy, G. Krishna Rao, S. Krishnakutumban, T. T. Krishnamachari, G. Krishnamurti, K. Kulasekharan, L. Krishnaswami Bharati, Kumararaja M. A. Muthiah Chettiyar of Chettinad, P. S. Kumaraswami Raja, K. Kuppuswami Aiyar, V. Kurmaiya, Lakshmi Ammal, O. Lakshmanaswami, P. Lakshmanaswami, P. Madhavan, R. S. Manickam, M. Marimuthu, S. T. P. Marimuthu Pillai, R. Maruthai, V. I. Munuswami Pillai, B. S. Murti, U. Muthuramalinga Thevar, K. A. Nachiyappa Gounder, A. P. N. V. Nadimuthu Pillai, S. Nagappa, N. Nagaraja Aiyangar, S. Nagiah, K. N. Nanjappa Gounder, D. L. Narasimha Raju, P. L. Narasimha Raj, C. Narasimhan, V. V. Narasimhan, D. Narayana Raju, K. V. Narayana Rao, M. G. Natesha Chettiyar, P. Natesha Mudaliar, C. Obi Reddy, V. C. Palaniswami Gounder, V. K. Palaniswami Gounder, R. M. Palat, M. Pallam Raju, C. R. Parthasarathi Aiyangar, P. Pedda Padalu, K. S. Periyaswami Gounder, K. Periyaswami Gounder, M. P. Periyaswami, V. R. Perumal Chettiyar, B. Perumal Naidu, R. Ponnuswami Pillai, T. Prakasham, R. Raghava Menon, C. Rajagopalachari, Rao Bahadur M. C. Rajah, Maharaja Pusapati Alakanarayana Gajapati Raju of Vizianagaram/Raja Y. Shivarama Prasad of Challapalli, (Note: The former died soon after being elected, the latter was elected in bypolls held in March 1937) B. Raja Rao, A. K. A. Ramachandra Reddiar, R. B. Ramakrishna Raju, T. N. Ramakrishna Reddy, D. Ramalinga Reddiar, A. Ramalingam, K. Raman Menon, S. Ramanathan, D. V. Ramaswami, K. S. Ramaswami Gounder, V. M. Ramaswami Mudaliar, N. G. Ramaswami Naidu, A. Rami Reddy, N. Ranga Reddy, C. Rangiah Naidu, P. Ratnavelu Tevar, A. S. Sahajananda Swami, K. Shaktivadivelu Gounder, P. R. K. Sharma, K. S. Saptarishi Reddiar, L. Satyanatha Karayalar, A. B. Shetty, K. Shanmugam, K. A. Shanmuga Mudaliar, B. T. Sheshadrichariar, H. Sitarama Reddy, K. Sitarama Reddiar, J. Shivashanmughan Pillai, Raja Bahadur Vasireddy Durgasadashiveshwara Prasad of Muktyala (in Krishna district), D. Srinivasa Aiyar, P. S. Srinivasa Aiyar, K. Subba Rao, Karunakaram Subba Rao, N. M. R. Subbarama Aiyar, P. Subbarayan, P. Subbiah, C. P. Subbiah Mudaliar, B. M. P. Subbaraya Chettiar, A. Subramanian, K. V. R. Swami, P. Shyamasundara Rao, V. S. R. M. Valliappa Chettiar, K. Varadachari, N. S. Varadachari, A. Vedaratnam Pillai, S. V. Venaudaya Gounder, G. Venkanna, G. Venkata Reddy, G. Venkata Reddy Naidu, K. Venkata Reddy, B. Venkatachalam Pillai, P. T. Venkatachari, B. Venkatanarayana Reddy, S. C. Venkatappa Chettiar, R. Venkatappa Naidu, K. Venkatappaya Pantulu, P. Venkatarama Aiyar, R. S. Venkataramiah, B. Venkatarao Baliga, R. Venkata Subba Reddiar, V. Venkatasubbaiya, T. Vishwanatham, K. P. Yagneshwara Sharma, T. V. K. Kamaraja Pandiya Nayakar of Bodinayakkannur, V. Narayana Gajapati Raju of Chemudu, Raja M. Venkataramaia Appa Rao of Mirzapuram (in Krishna district), Abdul Hamid Khan, Nawab C. Abdul Rahman Hakim, Abdur Ali Raja of Arakkal, K. Abdur Rahman Khan, D. Abdul Rauf, Khan Bahadur P. M. Attakoya Thangal, Syed Bashir Ahmed, Syed Mohiuddin Ghaus, H. S. Hussain, A. K. Kaderkutti, Khan Bahadur P. Khalifullah Rowther Sahib, P. I. Kunhammad Kutti Haji, Mehbub Ali Beg, Mir Akram Ali, P. K. Moideen Kutty, Khan Sahib Muhammad Abdul Kadir Rowther, Muhammad Abdur Rahman, Muhammad Mohideen Maracair Ahmad Thambi, Khan Bahadur Muhammad Schamnad, K. Muhammad Rahmatullah, Syed Ibrahim, M. A. Salam, S. K. Sheikh Rowther, Sheikh Muhammad Laljan, Khan Sahib K. A. Sheikh Dawood, V. S. T. Sheikh Mansur Tharaganar, Khan Sahib V. K. Unnikammoo, Yakub Hassan, Diwan Bahadur A. Appadurai Pillai, C. J. Varkey, D. R. Isaac, Rao Bahadur A. T. Pannirselvam, J. Raja Rao, V. J. Samu Pillai, J. L. P. Roche Victoria, Dr. M. J. Samuel, Rukmini Lakshmipathi, Mrs C. Ammanna Raja, Anjalai Ammal, A. V. Kuttimalu Amma, K. Lakshmi Ammal, Dr. N. Lakshmi Devi, Mrs Khadija Yakub Hassan, Mrs Jebamoney Masilamoney, E. H. M. Bower, W. M. Browning, C. R. T. Congreve, E. M. D'Mello, W. K. M. Langley, J. Nuttald, G. B. Reade, J. M. Smith, Sir William Owen Wright |
| North West Frontier Province | Malik Khuda Baksh Khan, Khan Muhammad Sarwar Khan, Khan Bahadur Nawab Sir Sahibzada Abdul Qayyum Khan, Khan Bahadur Sadullah Khan, Khan Abdullah Khan, Khan Abdul Aziz Khan, Khan Abdul Ghaffar Khan, Arbab Abdul Ghafoor Khan, Abdur Rab Khan Nishtar, Khan Sahib Raja Abdur Rahman Khan, Arbab Addur Rahman Khan, Khan Sahib Abdul Majid Khan, Khan Akbar Ali Khan, Nawabzada Allah Nawaz Khan of Dera Ismail Khan, Khan Amir Muhammad Khan, Khan Sahib Sardar Asadullah Khan, Qazi Ataullah Khan, Khan Azizullah Khan, Captain Nawab Baz Muhammad Khan of Teri, Khan Faizullah Khan Ghazni, M. Faqira Khan, Mian Jaffar Shah, Pir Syed Jalal Shah, Khan Abdul Jabbar Khan, Khan Malik ur Rahman Khan, Khan Muhammad Abbas Khan, Khan Muhammad Afzal Khan, Khan Sahib Muhammad Attai Khan, Sardar Muhammad Aurangzeb Khan, Pir Muhammad Kamran, Nawabzada Muhammad Said Khan, Khan Muhammad Samin Jan, Nawab Muhammad Zaffar Khan, Lieutenant M. Muhammad Zaman Khan, Khan Nasrullah Khan, M. Pir Baksh Khan, Khan Zarin Khan, Mian Ziauddin, Rai Bahadur Meherchand Khanna, Lala Bhanjuram Gandhi, Rai Bahadur Lala Chimanlal Setalvad, Dr. C. C. Ghosh, Lala Hukumchand, Rai Bahadur Lala Ishwardas Sahni, Lala Jamuna Das, Rai Bahadur Lala Ruchiram Khattar, Rai Sahib Lala Kanwar Bhan Bagai, Sardar Ajit Singh, Sardar Jagat Singh Narag, Rai Sahib Parmanand |
| Orissa | Rajakrushna Basu, Bichitrananda Das, Atalabihari Acharya, Kanai Samal, Nabakrushna Choudhury, Nityananda Kanungo, Jadumani Mangaraj, Gobindaprasad Singh, Lokenath Mishra, Birakishore Behara, Dwarkanath Das, Raja Birabara Narayanchandra Dhiranarendra of Gadamadhupur (in Jajpur district), Sadhucharan Das, Girijabhushan Dutta, Mohan Das, Jagabandhu Sinha, Biswanath Behara, Jagannath Mishra, Prananath Patnaik, Godabarish Mishra, Mukundaprasad Das, Nandakishore Das, Charuchandra Ray, Chakradhar Behara, Nidhi Das, Jagannath Das, Nrupalal Singh, Bodhram Dubey, Prahaladarai Lath, Fakira Behara, Bibhar Bishi, Lal Artatran Singh Deo of Khariar, Bishwanath Das, Raja Bahadur Ramachandra Mardaraja Deo of Khallikote, Mandhata Gorachand Patnaik, Gobindo Pradhan, Punya Naik, Dibakar Patnaik, Ramachandra Deb, Vyasaraju Kashivishvanadham Raju, Gobindachandra Thatraj Bahadur, Captain Maharaja Krushnachandra Gajapati Narayana Deo of Paralakhemudi, Sadashiva Tripathy, Radhamohan Sahu, Radhakrishna Biswas Roy, Premananda Mohanty, Ranga Lal, Brajasundar Das, Raja Krushnachandra Mansingh Harichandan Mardaraja Brahmabara Rai of Nilagiri, Pyarishankar Ray, Haripani Jena, Balabhadranarayana Samanta, Radhamohan Panda, Khan Bahadur Saiyid Ahmad Baksh, Saiyid Fazle Haque, Abdus Sobhan Khan, Latifur Rahman, Sarala Debi, A. Lakshmi Bai, Rev. E. M. Evans |
| Punjab | Mian Abdul Aziz, Sufi Abdul Hamid Khan, Mian Abdul Haye, Mian Abdul Rab, Chaudhury Abdul Rahim, Abdul Rahim Chaudhuri, Syed Afzal Ali Hasnik, Ahmad Baksh Khan, Chaudhury Ahmad Yar Khan, Khan Bahadur Mian Ahmad Yar Khan Daulatana, Pir Akbar Ali, Chaudhury Ali Akbar, Khan Bahadur Nawab Malik Allah Baksh Khan, Syed Amjad Ali Shah, Captain Ashiq Hussain, Mian Badr Mohiuddin, Malik Barkat Ali, Rai Faiz Muhammad Khan, Sheikh Faiz Muhammad, Chaudhury Fakir Hussain Khan, Subedar Major Farman Ali Khan, Raja Fateh Khan, Fateh Muhammad Mian, Fateh Sher Khan Malik, Khan Bahadur Nawab Chaudhury Fazal Ali Khan, Khan Sahib Fazal Din, Mian Fazal Karim Baksh, Ghazanfar Ali Khan Raja, Khwaja Ghulam Hussain, M. Ghulam Mohiuddin, Khwaja Ghulam Murtaza, Khan Sahib Ghulam Qadar Khan, Chaudhury Ghulam Rasul, Khwaja Ghulam Samad, Malik Habibullah Khan, Khan Haibat Khan Daha, Chaudhury Jahangir Khan, Sheikh Karamat Ali, Khalid Latif Gauba, Khizar Hayat Khan Tiwana, Mir Maqbul Mahmud, M. Mazhar Ali Azhar, Pir Mohiuddin Lal Badshah, Syed Mubarak Ali Shah, Chaudhury Muhammad Abdul Rahman Khan, Muhammad Akram Khan, Dr. Muhammad Alam, Chaudhury Muhammad Ashraf, Nawabzada Muhammad Faiyaz Ali Khan, Muhammad Hassan, Khan Bahadur Sardar Muhammad Hassan Khan Gurchani, Khan Bahadur Makhdum Syed Muhammad Hassan, Nawab Sir Malik Muhammad Hayat Khan Noon (father of Feroz Khan Noon), Sardar Muhammad Hussain, Chaudhury Muhammad Hussain, Mian Muhammad Iftikaruddin, Khan Bahadur Nawab Sir Muhammad Jamal Khan Leghari, Major Sardar Muhammad Nawab Khan, Makhdumzada Haji Syed Muhammad Raza Shah Gilani, Khan Sahib Nawab Muhammad Saadat Ali Khan, Chaudhury Muhammad Sarfraz Khan, Raja Muhammad Sarfraz Khan, Khan Sahib Muhammad Shafi Ali Khan, Makhdumzada Haji Syed Muhammad Wilayat Hussain Gilani, Choudhury Muhammad Yasin Khan, M. Muhammad Yusuf Khan, Khan Bahadur Mian Mushtaq Ahmad Gurmani, Sardar Muzaffar Ali Khan, Khan Bahadur Captain Malik Muzaffar Khan, Khan Bahadur Nawab Muzaffar Khan, Chaudhury Nasiruddin, Pir Nasiruddin Shah, Rana Nasrullah Khan, Syed Nawazish Ali Shah, Khan Sahib Mian Nur Ahmad Khan, Mian Nurullah, Khan Sahib Chaudhury Pir Muhammad, Khan Sahib Chaudhury Riaqat Ali, Chaudhury Sahib Daud Khan, Dr. Saifuddin Kitchlew, Chaudhury Sir Shahabuddin Virk, Rai Shahadat Khan, Nawab Khan Shahnawaz Khan, Khan Bahadur Major Sardar Sir Sikandar Hayat Khan, Mian Sultan Mahmud Hatiana, Khan Talib Hussain Khan, Chaudhury Umar Hayat Khan, Sardar Wali Muhammad Syed Hiraj, Chaudhury Anant Ram, Rai Sahib Lala Atma Ram, Rao Bahadur Captain Rao Balbir Singh, Lala Bhagat Ram Choda, Pandit Bhagat Ram Sharma, Rai Bhagwant Singh, Lala Bhimsen Sachar, Rai Bahadur Binda Saran, Diwan Chaman Lal, Rao Bahadur Chaudhury Chhotu Ram, Lala Deshbandhu Gupta, Lieutenant Dina Nath, Lala Duni Chand, Chaudhury Fakir Chand, Mahant Girdhari Das, Dr. Sir Gokul Chand Narang, Rai Sahib Lala Gopal Das, Sardar Gopal Singh, Dr. Gopichand Bhargava, Bhagat Hans Raj, Rai Hari Chand, Lala Harnam Das, Rai Sahib Chaudhury Hey Ram, Jugal Kishore, Chaudhury Kartar Singh, Seth Kishan Das, Krishna Gopal Dutt, Manohar Lal, Rai Bahadur Mukandlal Puri, Mula Singh, Pandit Munilal Kalia, Diwan Bahadur Raja Narendra Nath, Chaudhury Rai, Chaudhury Prem Singh, Seth Ram Narain Arora, Chaudhury Ram Sarup, Chaudhury Ranpat, Thakur Ripudaman Singh, Dr. Santram Seth, Chaudhury Sumar Singh, Rai Bahadur Lala Shyam Lal, Lala Shiv Dayal, Shriram Sharma, Lala Sitaram, Lala Sudarshan, Chaudhury Surajmal, Chaudhury Tikaram, Sardar Ajit Singh, Sardar Baldev Singh, Sardar Balwant Singh, Rai Bahadur Sardar Basakha Singh, Sardar Charan Singh, Sardar Dasaundha Singh, Sardar Sahib Sardar Gurbachan Singh, Sardar Hari Singh, Sardar Harjap Singh Bains, Lieutenant Harnam Singh Sodhi, Sardar Indar Singh, Sardar Jagjit Singh Bedi, Jagjit Singh Tikka, Sardar Joginder Singh Man, Sardar Joginder Singh, Master Kabul Singh, Sardar Kapoor Singh, Sardar Kartar Singh, Sardar Lal Singh Kamla, Sardar Narottam Singh, Lieutenant Sardar Naunihal Singh Mann, Sardar Partap Singh Kairon, Mahant Prem Singh, Sardar Pritam Singh Siddhu, Sardar Rur Singh, Sardar Sampuran Singh, Sardar Sahib Sardar Santokh Singh, Sardar Sohan Singh Josh, Sardar Bahadur Dr Sardar Sir Sundar Singh Majithia, Sardar Tara Singh, Sardar Sahib Sardar Ujjal Singh, Sardar Uttam Singh Duggal, S. P. Singha, Chaudhury Jalaluddin Amber, Jahanara Shahnawaz, Rashida Latif, Parbati Jaichand, Raghbir Kaur, E. Few, William Roberts |
| Sindh | Abdul Majid Lilaram, Abdus Satar Abdur Rahman, Khan Sahib Allah Baksh Khudadad Gabol, Khan Bahadur Allah Baksh Muhammad Soomro, Khan Bahadur Mir Allahdad Khan Imam, Khan Bahadur Haji Amir Ali Tharu, Arbab Togachi Mir Muhammad, Mir Bandeh Ali Khan Talpur, Mir Ghulam Ali Khan Talpur, Mir Ghulam Allah Khan, Sir Ghulam Hussain Hidayatullah, Makhdum Ghulam Hyder Makhdum Zahiruddin, Pir Ghulam Hyder Shah Sahibdino Shah, Ghulam Muhammad Abdullah Khan Isran, Syed Ghulam Murtaza Shah Muhammad Shah, Khan Bahadur Syed Ghulam Nabi Shah Mauj Ali Shah, Pir Illahi Baksh Nawaz Ali, Khan Sahib Jaffar Khan Gul Muhammad Khan Burdi, Jam Jan Muhammad Khan Muhammad Sharif Junejo, Khan Bahadur Kaiser Khan Ghulam Muhammad Khan, Syed Khair Shah Imam Ali Shah, Miran Muhammad Shah Zainulabdin Shah, Syed Muhammad Ali Shah Allahando Shah, Khan Bahadur Muhammad Ayub Khan Shah Muhammad Khan Khuhro, Muhammad Hashim Faiz Muhammad Gazdar, Mir Muhammad Khan Nawab Ghaibi Khan Chandio, Muhammad Usman Muhammad Khan Soomro, Khan Bahadur Muhammad Yusuf Khan Muhammad Khan Chandio, Syed Noor Muhammad Shah Murad Ali Shah, Rasul Baksh Khan Muhammad Baksh Khan Uner, Khan Sahib Rasul Baksh Shah Mahbub Shah, Shamsuddin Khan Abdul Kabir Khan, Khan Sahib Sohrab Khan Sahibdino Khan Sharqi, Mir Zenuddin Khan Sundar Khan Sundarani, Dewan Bhojsingh Gurdinomal Pahlajani, Mukhi Gobindram Pritamdas, Rai Sahib Gokaldas Mewaldas, Hassaram Sundardas Pamnani, Hemandas Rupchand Wadhwani, Hotchand Hirachand, Diwan Bahadur Hiranand Khemsingh, Iswardas Varandmal, Narayandas Anandji Bechar, Newandram Vishindas, Nihchaldas Chatumal Vazirani, Partabrai Khaisukhdas, Dr. Popatlal A. Bhoopatkar, Shitaldas Perumal, Ghanshyam Jethanand Shivadasani, Daulatram Mohandas, Ghanumal Tarachand, Dialmal Daulatram (father of Jairamdas Daulatram), Akhiji Ratansingh Sodhi, Jamshed Nauserwanji Mehta, Rustomji Khurshedji Sidwa, Jenubai Ghulam Ali Allana, Jethibai Tulsidas Sipahimalani, Colonel H. J. Mahon, J. J. Flock, G. H. Raschen |
| United Provinces | Chandrabhanu Gupta, Chaudhury Narain Das Chamar, Dr. Jawaharlal Rohtagi, Dayal Dass Chamar, Seth Achal Singh, Karan Singh Jatav, Sampurnanand, Purushottam Das Tandon, Hari Lal, Ajitprasad Jain, Pandit Pyarelal Sharma, Acharya Jugal Kishore, Atmaram Govind Kher, Prof. Ram Saran, Pandit Govindballabh Pant, Acharya Narendra Deva, Bindvasiniprasad Varma, Mrs Sharmada Mahavir Tyagi, Thakur Phul Singh, Chaudhury Bihari Lal, Thakur Manik Singh, Chaudhury Bhim Sen, Thakur Todar Singh Tomar, Lala Jwalaprasad Jigyasu, Thakur Malkhan Singh, Prof. Krishna Chandra, Chaudhury Shivamangal Singh, Ramchandra Paliwal, Dr. Manikchand Jatav Vir, Pandit Jaganprasad Rawat, Pandit Jivalal Dwivedi, Chaudhury Mizazilal Dhanuk, Chaudhury Bireshwar Singh, Baburam Varma, Vidyavati Rathore, Kunwar Charat Singh Shamsher Jung of Sahanpur, Chaudhury Khub Singh, Daudayal Khanna, Pandit Shankardutt Sharma, Thakur Prithviraj Singh, Pandit Dwarka Prasad, Pandit Devnarain Bharaya, Thakur Sadho Singh, Thakur Rukum Singh Rathore, Lakhandas Jatav, Chaudhury Badan Singh, Thakur Bhagwan Singh, Pandit Rameshwar Dayal Vaidya, Uma Nehru, Suba Balwant Singh, Chaudhury Buddhu Singh, Hotilal Agarwal, Ramswarup Gupta, Pandit Venkateshnarain Tiwari, Dr. Murari Lal, Charan Singh, Pandit Shivadayal Upadhyay, Dr. Kailashnath Katju, Ranjit Sitaram Pandit, Lalbahadur Shastri, Pandit Raghunath Vinayak Dhulekar, Pandit Bhagwatnarain Bhargava, Pandit Mannilal Pandey, Chaudhuri Lotan Ram, Diwan Shatrughan Singh, Chaudhury Keshavchandra Singh, Thakur Harprasad Singh, Pandit Yajnanarain Upadhyay, Pandit Kamlapati Tiwari, Maharajakunwar Vijayananda Gajapatiraj, Vishwanath Prasad, Raja Shardamaheshprasad Singh Shah of Barhar (in Sonbhadra district), Thakur Birbal Singh, Pandit Keshavdev Malaviya, Parasram Rai, Pandit Indradev Tripathi, Thakur Radhamohan Singh, Thakur Surajnarain Singh, Pandit Mohanlal Gautam, Thakur Gurcharan Singh, Dr. Biswanath Mukherjee, Prayagdhwaj Singh, Shibhanlal Saksena, Puranmaal Chamar, Pandit Ramdhari Pandey, Kashiprasad Rai, Pandit Ramkumar Shastri, Pandit Sitaram Shukla, Harnath Prasad Chamar, Pandit Ramcharittar Pandey, Sitaram Asthana, Gajadhar Prasad Chamar, Pandit Radhakant Malaviya, Pandit Algurai Shastri, Kunwar Anand Singh of Kashipur, Pandit Hargovind Pant, Munshi Ramprasad Tamta, Thakur Jagmohan Singh Negi, Pandit Anasuyaprasad Bahuguna, Gopinath Srivastava, Pandit Vishambhardayal Tripathi, Pandit Jatashankar Shukla, Lal Surendrabahadur Singh of Simri (in Unnao district), Suniti Devi Mitra, Bhawani Pasi, Pandit Lakshmishankar Bajpai, Chhedalal Gupta, Pandit Shanti Swarup, Rai Sahib Thakur Bhabhuti Singh, Pandit Shivaram Dwivedi, Pragi Lal, Jagannath Prasad Agarwal, Thakur Laltabaksh Singh, Pandit Bansidhar Mishra, Kunwar Khuswaqt Rai of Lakhimpur, Maharani Jagadamba Devi of Ayodhya, Pandit Krishnanath Kaul, Paltu Ram, Thakur Ramnaresh Singh, Kunwar Jung Bahadur Singh of Amethi, Sundarlal Gupta, Thakur Hukum Singh, Pandit Bhagwandin Mishra, Lalbihari Tandon, Munshi Iswar Saran, Kunwar Raghuvendrapratap Singh of Mankapur, Pandit Harishchandra Bajpai, Pandit Govind Malaviya, Krishnanandnath Khare, Rajmata Thakurain Parvati Kunwari of Ramnagar Dhamari (in Barabanki district), Chetram Pasi, Raja Bishweshwardayal Seth of Kotra (in Sitapur district), Raja Jagannathbaksh Singh of Rahwan, Rai Bahadur Lala Prayag Narain, Raja Durganarain Singh of Tirwa (in Kannauj district), Rai Govindchandra Agarwal, Sir Jwalaprasad Srivastava, Lala Padampat Singhania, Binoykumar Mukherjee, Nawab Muhammad Ismail Khan of Meerut, Sheikh Ghalib Rasul, Khan Bahadur Hafiz Muhammad Ghazanfarullah Khan, Maulvi Aziz Ahmad Khan, Maulvi Karim-ur-Raza Khan, Khan Bahadur Maulvi Akhtar Ali, Khan Bahadur Nawab Abdul Samad Khan of Talibnagar, Dr. Abdus Samad, Zahur Ahmad, Muhammad Ikram Khan, Maulvi Rizwanullah, Chaudhuri Khaliquzzaman, Muhammad Wasim, Maulvi Qazi Abdul Wali Khan, Maulvi Munfait Ali, Khan Bahadur Sheikh Muhammad Ziaul Haq, Sahibzada Syed Hasan Ali Khan, Nawabzada Muhammad Liaqat Ali Khan of Kunjpura, Tahir Hussain, Nawab Muhammad Jamshed Ali Khan of Baghpat, Muhammad Shaukat Ali Khan, Nawab Sir Muhammad Ahmad Said Khan of Chhatari, Khan Bahadur Haji Maulvi Muhammad Obaidur Rehman Khan Sherwar, Khan Bahadur Sheikh Badruddin, Haji Maulvi Muhammad Jan Khan, Khan Bahadur Sheikh Khaliluddin Ahmad, Khan Bahadur Muhammad Raza Khan, Chaudhuri Islamullah Khan, Hafiz Muhammad Ibrahim, Akhtar Hasan Khan, Chaudhuri Zafar Hasan Khan, Maulvi Muhammad Ismail, Zainul Abidin, Khan Bahadur Maulvi Fasiuddin, Khan Bahadur Maulvi Muhammad Fazlur Rahman Khan, Khan Bahadur Sheikh Imitiaz Ahmad, Khan Bahadur Muhammad Sultan Alam Khan, Nafisul Hasan, Mahmud Hussain Khan, Nawab Sir Muhammad Yusuf of Jaunpur, Rafiuddin Ahmad, Khan Sahib Muhammad Hasan, Syed Muhammad Athar, Munshi Muhammad Suleiman Ansari, Muhammad Faruq, Zahirul Hasnain Lari, Qazi Muhammad Adil Abbasi, Abdul Hakim, Muhammad Ishaq Khan, Maulvi Iqbal Ahmad Khan, Sheikh Zahiruddin Faruqi, Raja Syed Ahmad Ali Khan Alavi of Salempur, Chaudhuri Haider Hussain, Mubashir Hussain Kidwai, Syed Alfaz Rasul, Raja Syed Sajid Hussain Ali of Kotwara (in Lakhimpur Kheri district), Raja Syed Muhammad Mehdi of Pirpur, Mirza Mahmud Beg, Ghulam Hassan Butt, Raja Syed Muhammad Sadat Ali Khan of Nanpara, Thakur Muhammad Asghar Ali of Tipraha (in Bahraich district)/Rafi Ahmad Kidwai, (Note: The former died soon after declaration of election results, causing the latter to be elected in his place in bypolls held in March 1937) Raja Muhammad Ahmad Ali Khan of Hasanpur, Khan Bahadur Sheikh Sayiduddin Ahmad, Maharaja Sir Muhammad Ejaz Rasul Khan of Jahangirabad Raj, Syed Muhammad Habibullah, Syed Hussain Zahir, Kr. Sir Maharaj Singh, S. C. Chatterjee, Satyavati Devi, Prakashvati Sood, Vijayalakshmi Pandit, Kunwarani Lakshmi Devi of Birwa (in Deoria district), Begum Inam Fatima Habibullah, Begum Kulsam Shahid Hussain, H. G. Walford, Desmond Young, Edward Matheson Souter, Captain S. R. Pocock |

Legislative councils results

| Province | Congress | Muslim League | Other parties | Independents | Europeans | Total |
|---|---|---|---|---|---|---|
| Assam | 0 | 0 | 6 (Assam Valley Muslim Party) | 10 (Hindus) | 2 | 18 |
| Bengal | 9 | 14 | 8 (Krishak Praja Party) 2 (Hindu Mahasabha) 1 (Congress Nationalist Party) | 12 (Hindus) 5 (Muslims) | 6 | 57 |
| Bihar | 8 | 0 | 3 (Muslim United Party) 3 (Muslim Independent Party) | 11 (Hindus) 2 (Muslims) | 1 | 28 |
| Bombay | 13 | 2 | 2 (Democratic Swarajya Party) 1 (Liberal Party) | 4 (Hindus) 3 (Muslims) | 1 | 26 |
| Madras | 26 | 3 | 5 (Justice Party) 1 (People's Party) | 6 (Hindus) 2 (Muslims) 2 (Christians) | 1 | 46 |
| United Provinces | 8 | 0 | 4 (National Agriculturists) 1 (Liberal Party) | 22 (Hindus) 16 (Muslims) | 1 | 52 |
| Total | 64 | 19 | 37 (including 22 Muslims) | 95 (including 28 Muslims) | 12 | 227 |

=== MLCs elected ===
| Province | Members elected directly | Members elected from the Assembly | Members nominated by Governor |
|---|---|---|---|
| Assam | Apurbakumar Ghosh, Satyendramohan Lahiri, Gajananda Agarwalla, Rameswar Saharia, Hemchandra Dutta, Saratchandra Bhattacharya, Sureshchandra Das, Monomohan Choudhury, Rai Sahib Balbaksh Agarwalla Hanchoria, Abdul Hye, Tafazzul Hussain Hazarika, Golam Mustafa Choudhury, Abdur Rahim Choudhury, Mohammad Asaduddin Choudhury, H. P. Gray, W. E. D. Cooper | NA | Herambaprasad Barua, Sonadhar Das Senapati, Mrs Zubida Ataur Rahman |
| Bengal | Rai Bahadur Keshabchandra Banerjee, Rai Bahadur Manmathanath Basu, Srishchandra Chakraborty, Lalitchandra Das, Kanailal Goswami, Rai Bahadur Brajendramohan Maitra, Rai Bahadur Satishchandra Mukherjee, Ranajit Pal Choudhury, Indubhushan Sarkar, Rai Sahib Jatindramohan Sen, Nur Ahmed, Naziruddin Ahmed, Muazzem Ali Choudhury, Khan Sahib Abdul Hamid Choudhury, Khorshed Alam Choudhury, Razzaqul Haider Choudhury, Humayun Reza Choudhury, Sheikh Fazal Elahi, Khwaja Muhammad Ismail, Syed Mohammad Ghaziul Huq, Khan Bahadur Mohammad Ibrahim, Khan Bahadur Sheikh Mohammad Jan, Khan Bahadur Mohammad Abdul Karim, Khan Bahadur Mohammad Asaf Khan, Khan Bahadur Ataur Rahman, Mukhlesur Rahman, Khan Bahadur Kazi Abdur Rashid, W. B. G. Laidaw, J. A. McKerrow, C. K. Nicholl | Bankimchandra Dutta, Narendrachandra Dutta, Kaminikumar Dutta, Satyendrachandra Mitra, Nareshnath Mukherjee, Dr. Radhakumud Mukherjee, Hanumanprasad Poddar, Nagendranarayan Roy, Maharaja Sir Manmathanath Roychoudhuri of Santosh, Rai Bahadur Radhikhabhusan Roy, Sachindranarayan Sanyal, Shaileshwar Singha Roy, Rai Bahadur Surendranarayan Sinha, Rai Bahadur Bhupendranarayan Sinha of Nashipur, Mesbahuddin Ahmed, Kader Baksh, Hamidul Huq Choudhury, Nawabzada Kamruddin Haider, Khan Bahadur Syed Muazzamuddin Hossain, Mohammad Hossain, Humayun Kabir, Maulana Mohammad Akram Khan, Khan Sahib Subid Ali Mollah, Khan Bahadur M. Shamsuzzoha, T. Lamb, E. C. Ormond, D. H. Wilmer | Dr. Arabinda Barua, Krishnachandra Roychoudhuri, Latafat Hossain, D. J. Cohen, Begum Hamida Momin, Mrs K. D. Rosario |
| Bihar | Kumar Rajivranjan Prasad Singh of Surajpura, Bishunlal Singh, Raja Bahadur Hariharprasad Narayan Singh of Amawan (in Nalanda district) O.B.E., Kumar Ganganand Singh of Srinagar (in Purnia district), Rai Bahadur Deonandan Prasad Singh, Kumar Ramanand Singh of Banaili, Bishwanath Prasad Narayan Singh of Chainpur, Rai Sahib Nalinikumar Sen, Baldeo Sahay, Khan Bahadur Syed Muhammad Ismail, Syed Naqi Imam, Syed Mubarak Ali, Jamilur Rahman, Alan Campbell Combe | Rai Brijraj Krishna, Bansi Lal, Puneydeo Sharma, Kamaleshwari Mandal, Gajindranarayan Singh, Balram Rai, Nageshwar Prasad Singh, Maheshwar Prasad Narayan Singh of Parsagarh (in Saran district), Tribeni Prasad Singh, Rai Bahadur Satishchandra Sinha, Gurusahay Lal, Khan Bahadur Syed Shah Wajid Hussain, Syed Muhammad Hafiz, Abdul Ahad Muhammad Noor | Brajnandan Prasad, Samuel Purti, Mrs Malcolm Sinha |
| Bombay | Atmaram Mahadeo Atawane, Madhavrao Gopalrao Bhonsle, Narayan Damodar Deodhekar, Dadubhai Purshottamdas Desai, Narsinghrao Shriniwasrao Desai, Sardar Rao Bahadur Chandrappa Baswantrao Desai, Ratilal Mulji Gandhi, Subray Ramchandra Haldipur, Mahadeo Rajaji Virkar, Ganesh Sakharam Mahajani, Premraj Shaligram Marwari, Chinubhai Lallubhai Mehta, Hansa Jivraj Mehta, Mangaldas Mancharam Pakvasa, Bheemji Badaji Poddar, Ramchandra Ganesh Pradhan, Shantilal Harjivan Shah, Ramchandra Ganesh Soman, Dr. K. A. Hameed, Abdul Sattar Khan Amir Khan Inamdar, Khan Sahib Muhammad Ibrahim Makhan, Muhammad Amin Wazir Muhammad Tambe, Baronet Ebrahim Currimbhoy, Prof. Sohrab R. Davar, Behram Naurosji Karanjia, Frederick Stones | NA | S. C. Joshi, Purshottamrai G. Solanki, Major Sardar Bhimrao Nagojirao Patankar, Terrance Martin D'Souza Guido |
| Madras | Rao Sahib A. S. Alaganan Chettiyar, B. Bheema Rao, Rao Bahadur K. Daivasigamani Mudaliar, V. Ganga Raju, M. D. Kumaraswami Mudaliar, K. Madhava Menon, K. P. Mallikarjunudu, D. Manjaya Hegde, M. Narayana Menon, M. Narayana Rao, B. Narayanaswami Naidu, P. Peddi Raju, C. Perumalaswami Reddiyar, Rao Bahadur M. Ramakrishna Reddy, T. A. Ramalingam Chettiyar, S. A. Ramanathan Chettiyar, U. Rama Rao, A. Rangaswami Aiyangar, N. R. Samiappa Mudaliar, N. Shankara Reddy, S. K. Shathakopa Mudaliar, K. S. Shivasubrahmanya Aiyer, K. V. Srinivasa Aiyanger, R. Srinivasa Aiyanger, T. C. Srinivasa Aiyanger, D. Sriramamurti, N. Subba Raju, L. Subbarami Reddy, L. Subba Rao, Rao Bahadur V. Vasanta Rao, P. Veerabhadraswami, N. Venkatachalamaji, V. Venkata Jogayya Pantulu, V. Venkatapunnayya, K. Venkataswami Naidu, Munshi Abdul Wahab, Syed Abdul Wahab Bukhari, S. K. Ahmed Miran, Khan Bahadur Maulvi Gulam Jilani Qureshi, Khan Bahadur Hamid Sultan Marakkayar, C. P. Mammu Keyi, Khan Bahadur T. M. Moidu, S. J. Gonsalves, Diwan Bahadur S. E. Runganadhan, Jerome A. Saldanha, Sir Frank Birley | NA | Dr. T. S. S. Rajan, C. Ramalinga Reddy, Rao Bahadur M. Raman, Diwan Bahadur R. Srinivasan, V. S. Srinivasa Shastri, Rai Bahadur Sir Kurma Venkata Reddy Naidu, Khan Bahadur Sir Muhammad Usman, Dr. P. J. Thomas, Mrs H. S. Hensman |
| United Provinces | Baij Nath, Rai Amarnath Agarwal, Rai Bahadur Brijendra Swarup, Mohan Krishna Varma, Chandra Bhal, Rai Sahib Lala Mathura Das, Lala Janardan Swarup, Lala Babulal Gohil, Lakshmi Narain, Harsahay Gupta, Lala Radheyraman Lal, Thakur Gopal Singh, Lala Ratanlal Jain, Rai Bahadur Chaudhury Badansingh Tewari, Rai Sahib Lala Rupchandra Jain, Kunwar Rameshwar Pratap Singh of Kasauta, Badriprasad Kakkar, Pandit Benimadho Tewari, Rai Bahadur Thakur Lakshmiraj Singh of Gabhana (in Aligarh district), Ramchandra Gupta, Rai Bahadur Lala Raghuraj Singh, Rai Sahib Lala Mohanlal Shah, Rai Bahadur Seth Kedarnath Khaitan, Raja Astabhujaprasad Srivastava of Changera (in Siddharthnagar district), Madhoprasad Khanna, Dr. Ram Ugrah Singh, Pandit Ramakant Malaviya (son of Madanmohan Malaviya), Rai Bahadur Thakur Hanuman Singh, Raja Sri Ram, Kunwar Diwakarprasad Singh of Kasmanda (in Sitapur district), Rai Bahadur Mohan Lal, Rup Narain, Bhaiya Durgaprasad Singh, Rai Bajrang Bahadur Singh of Bhadri, Islam Ahmad Khan, Nawab Muhammad Faiyaz Khan, Dr. Mahmudullah Jung, Khan Bahadur Syed Ahmad Hussain Rizvi, Khan Bahadur Muhammad Zaki, Syed Agha Hyder, Khan Bahadur Syed Akbar Ali Khan, Muhammad Abid Khan Sherwani, Hafiz Ahmad Hussain, Waheed Ahmad, Muhammad Faruq, Khan Bahadur Haji Maulvi Muhammad Nisarullah, Syed Kalbe Abbas, Begum Aizaz Rasul, Chaudhury Akhtar Hussain, Ishar Ahmad Faruqi, Sir Tracey Gavin Jones | NA | Dr. Sir Sitaram, Rai Bahadur N. K. Mukherjee, Ram Sahay, Pandit Hariharnath Shastri, Risaldar Major Captain Amir Muhammad Khan, C. St. L. Teyen, Mrs H. S. Gupta, Lady Wazir Hasan |

== Government formation ==
The Congress initially refused to form governments in the provinces it had won because the Government of India Act empowered the Governor to over-rule Cabinet decisions & wield control over finances. However, S. Satyamurti launched a campaign within the Congress party, convincing Mahatma Gandhi to direct Congress leaders in accepting premiership positions. On 22 June, Governor-General Lord Linlithgow issued a statement declaring the willingness of the British administration to work alongside the Congress within the ambit of the GoI Act. On 1 July, the Congress Working Committee formally took the decision to form governments in the provinces.

=== Madras Presidency ===
In Madras, the Congress formed the government by winning 159 seats, eclipsing the incumbent Justice Party (21 seats). The Muslim League won 9 out of the 28 seats reserved for the Muslims. On the initial refusal of Congress to assume power, Kurma Venkata Reddy Naidu of the Justice Party was sworn in as Chief Minister of Madras State on 1 April by the governor John Erskine. Three months later, the Congress staked claim & C. Rajagopalachari was sworn in. The legislatures convened under the chairmanship of B. Sambamurthy (assembly) & Dr. U. Rama Rao (council).

Rajagopalachari ministry
| Name | Department |
|---|---|
| C. Rajagopalachari | Chief Minister, Home and Finance |
| T. Prakasham | Revenue |
| Dr. T. S. S. Rajan | Public Health |
| Dr. P. Subbarayan | Education and Law |
| Yakub Hasan | Public works |
| V. I. Munuswamy Pillai | Agriculture and Rural Development |
| S. Ramanathan | Public Information |
| V. V. Giri | Industries and Labour |
| K. Raman Menon | Courts and Prisons |
| B. Gopala Reddy | Local administration |

=== Sind ===
The Sind Legislative Assembly had 60 members. The Sind United Party emerged the leader with 21 seats, and the Congress secured 5 seats. Mohammad Ali Jinnah had tried to set up a League Parliamentary Board in Sindh in 1936, but he failed, though 72% of the population was Muslim. Though 34 seats were reserved for Muslims, the Muslim League could secure none of them. Ghulam Hussain Hidayatullah of the Sindh Muslim League was sworn in as the Chief Minister of Sind with Hindu Mahasabha support on 28 April by Governor Sir Lancelot Graham. Within a year, the Hindu Mahasabha retracted its support and brought Allah Bux Soomro of the Sind United Party into power. The assembly convened under the chairmanship of Bhojsingh Pahlajani.

Hidayatullah ministry
| Name | Department |
|---|---|
| Ghulam Hussain Hidayatullah | Chief Minister, Home and Finance |
| Mukhi Gobindram Pritamdas | Irrigation |
| Mir Bandeh Ali Khan Talpur | Revenue |

=== United Provinces ===
The UP legislature consisted of a Legislative Council of 52 elected and 6 or 8 nominated members and a Legislative Assembly of 228 elected members: some from exclusive Muslim constituencies, some from "General" constituencies, and some "Special" constituencies. The Congress won a clear majority in the United Provinces, with 133 seats, while the Muslim League won only 27 out of the 64 seats reserved for Muslims.

The Congress refused to form a coalition with the League, even though the two parties had a verbal understanding to do so. The party offered the Muslim League a role in government if it merged itself into the Congress Party. While this position had a good basis it proved to be a mistake. The Congress disregarded that even though they had captured the large part of UP's general seats, they had not won any of the reserved Muslim seats, of which the Muslim League had won 29.

On the Congress' refusal to assume power, the Nawab of Chhatari from the National Agriculturist Party was sworn in on 3 April by the governor Harry Graham Haig. Three months later, the Congress laid claim to government formation and Govind Ballabh Pant was sworn in as the Chief Minister of United Provinces. The legislatures convened under the chairmanship of Purushottamdas Tandon (assembly) & Sir Sitaram (council).

Pant ministry
| Name | Department |
|---|---|
| Govind Ballabh Pant | Chief Minister, Finance, Forest and Police |
| Rafi Ahmed Kidwai | Revenue, Agriculture, Publicity and Jails |
| Dr. Kailashnath Katju | Justice, Industries and Co-operatives |
| Vijaya Lakshmi Pandit | Local self-government |
| Pyarelal Sharma | Education |
| Hafiz Muhammad Ibrahim | Communication |

=== Assam ===
In Assam, the Congress won 33 seats out of a total of 108 making it the single largest party, but initially refused to form government. So Sir Muhammed Saadulah of the Assam Valley Muslim Party was sworn in as the Chief Minister of Assam on 1 April by the governor Robert Niel Raid. One year later he was replaced with Gopinath Bordoloi of the Congress. The legislatures convened under the chairmanship of Basanta Kumar Das (assembly) & Monomohan Lahiri (council).

Saadulah ministry
| Name | Department |
|---|---|
| Muhammed Saadulah | Chief Minister |
| Rohini Kumar Chaudhuri | |
| Abu Nasr Waheed | |
| Ali Haider Khan | |
| Rev. J. J. M. Nichols Roy | |

=== Bombay Presidency ===
In Bombay, the Congress won 86 out of the 175 seats, falling just short of gaining half the seats. However, it was able to draw on the support of some small pro-Congress groups to form a working majority. After the Congress initially refuse to take power, the governor Michael Knatchbull sworn in Dhanjishah Cooper of the Non-Brahmin party as the Chief Minister of Bombay on 1 April. Four months later, the Congress staked claim for government formation and B.G. Kher was sworn in. The legislatures convened under chairmanship of Ganesh Vasudev Mavalankar (assembly) & Mangaladas Mancharam Pakvasa (council).

Kher ministry
| Name | Department |
|---|---|
| Balasaheb Gangadhar Kher | Chief Minister, Education |
| Anna Babaji Latthe | Finance |
| Kanaiyalal Maneklal Munshi | Home and Legal Affairs |
| Manchershah Dhanjibhai Gilder | Health and Excise |
| Morarji Desai | Revenue, Agriculture and Rural Development |
| M. Y. Nuri | Public Works |
| L. M. Patel | Local self-government and miscellaneous |

=== Punjab ===
Sikandar Hayat Khan of the Unionist Party, with support of the Khalsa National Party and Hindu Election Board was sworn in as the Chief Minister of Punjab on 5 April by the governor Sir Herbert Emerson. The assembly convened under the chairmanship of Shahabuddin Virk.

Hayat Khan ministry
| Name | Department |
|---|---|
| Sikandar Hayat Khan | Chief Minister, Law & Order |
| Manohar Lal | Finance |
| Sundar Singh Majithia | Revenue |
| Chhotu Ram | Development |
| Khizar Hayat Tiwana | Public Works |
| Abdul Haye | Education |

=== Bengal ===
A. K. Fazlul Huq of the Krishak Praja Party formed a coalition government with the support of Khawaja Nazimuddin of the Muslim League & independent Dalit MLAs like Jogendranath Mandal. He was sworn in on 1 April as the Chief Minister of Bengal by the governor Sir John Anderson. The legislatures convened under the chairmanship of Azizul Huq (assembly) & Satyendra Chandra Mitra (council).

Huq ministry
| Name | Department |
|---|---|
| A. K. Fazlul Huq | Chief Minister, Education |
| Nalini Ranjan Sarkar | Finance |
| Khawaja Nazimuddin | Home |
| Bijoy Prasad Singh Ray | Revenue |
| Khawaja Habibullah | Agriculture and Industry |
| Sris Chandra Nandy | Communication and Public Works |
| Hussain Shaheed Suhrawardy | Commerce and Labour |
| Musharraf Hossain | Judicial and Legislature |
| Syed Nausher Ali | Local self-government |
| Prasanna Deb Raikut | Forest and Excise |
| Mukunda Behari Mullick | Co-operative Credit & Rural indebtedness |

=== North West Frontier Province ===
In the overwhelmingly Muslim majority North-West Frontier Province, Congress won 19 out of 50 seats and was able, with minor party support, to form a ministry. Due to the Congress' initial refusal to form government, the governor Sir George Cunningham sworn in Sahibzada Abdul Qayyum of the Muslim Independent Party as the Chief Minister on 1 April. Five months later, the Congress laid claims to government formation & Khan Abdul Jabbar Khan was sworn in. The assembly convened under the chairmanship of Malik Khuda Baksh Khan.

Jabbar Khan ministry
| Name | Department |
|---|---|
| Khan Abdul Jabbar Khan | Chief Minister |
| Qazi Ataullah Khan | |
| Khan Mohammad Abbas Khan | |
| Bhanjuram Gandhi | |

=== Orissa province ===
As the Congress initially refused to assume power, other people had to be sworn in. On 1 April, governor Sir John Austen Hubback sworn in the Maharaja of Paralakhemudi Krushna Chandra Gajapati as Prime Minister of Odisha. In July, the Congress laid stake to government formation, under the leadership of Bishwanath Das. The legislative assemblies convened under the chairmanship of by Mukunda Prasad Das.

Das ministry
| Name | Department |
|---|---|
| Bishwanath Das | Prime Minister, Home, Finance and Education |
| Nityananda Kanungo | Revenue, Health, Public Works and Local self-government |
| Bodhram Dubey | Law and Commerce |

=== Bihar province ===
As the Congress initially refused to assume power, other people had to be sworn in. On 1 April, governor Sir Maurice Garnier Hallett sworn in Muhammad Yunus of the Muslim Independent Party as the Chief Minister of Bihar.

In July, the Congress laid stake to government formation, and Shri Krishna Sinha was sworn into power in Bihar. The legislatures in Bihar were convened under the chairmanship of Sachchidananda Sinha (assembly) & Rajivranjan Prasad Singh (council).

Sinha ministry
| Name | Department |
|---|---|
| Shri Krishna Sinha | Chief Minister, Education and Local self-government |
| Anugrah Narayan Sinha | Land Revenue, Finance and Development |
| Dr. Syed Mahmud | Law and Order |
| Jaglal Choudhury | Agriculture, Labour and Unemployment |

=== Central province ===
In Central Provinces, an interim government was formed by Dr. E. Raghavendra Rao, sworn in by the governor Sir Hyde Gowan. In August, Narayan Bhaskar Khare was sworn in as Chief Minister of Central Provinces. Within a year, he was sacked from the Congress by the Congress president Subhash Chandra Bose & replaced by Ravishankar Shukla. The Central Provinces Legislative assembly was chaired by Ghanshyam Singh Gupta.

Khare ministry
| Name | Department |
|---|---|
| Narayan Bhaskar Khare | Chief Minister, Home |
| P. B. Gole | Revenue |
| D. K. Mehta | Finance |
| Ravishankar Shukla | Education |
| N. Y. Shareef | Law and Justice |
| Ramrao Deshmukh | Public Works |
| Dwarka Prasad Mishra | Local self-government |

== Analysis ==
The Congress received the support from all sections of the Hindu society, across provincial identities, caste lines & the rural-urban divide. Although having a significant upper-caste leadership (which was extremely acute in places like Bihar, Bombay & Madras), no caste group felt itself unrepresented within the Congress. While the Congress was able to consolidate the support of Hindus in Hindu majority provinces, it failed to do so in Sindh, Punjab & North West Frontier Province - places where Hindus were in minority, due to its position on the Communal Award. In these areas, Congress support was mostly restricted to the urban areas. The only exception was Bengal, where the Hindu support consolidated behind the Congress as the bhadralok who disproportionately constituted the community of political representatives among the Bengali Hindu society found the Hindu Mahasabha's reactionary stance unappealing. Outside of rural Sindh, whose separation from the Hindu majority Bombay it bitterly opposed, the Hindu Mahasabha found little electoral support among Hindus elsewhere. The Hindu Mahasabha's emphasis on Brahmin supremacy alienated the non-Brahmins & Dalits. Bengal was an exception, where it won 2 rural seats reserved for Dalits due to the 1932 pact between Dalit leader M. C. Rajah & Hindu Mahasabha leader B. S. Moonje. The conservative rural Hindu electorate in Hindu majority areas didn't found the Hindu Mahasabha's campaign of achieving a Hindu theocracy & preventing government interference in religious matters like temple entry of Dalits unattractive over Nehru's concern for agrarian distress in the backdrop of the Great Depression through promises of land reforms, adjustment of taxation rates, declaration of moratorium of debts & increased spending on rural development in his 1936 presidential address in Lucknow. Although patronized by zamindars, many of the Hindu Mahasabha supporters chose to participate as independents or other landlord parties rather than under the Mahasabha affiliation. Even Shyamaprasad Mukherjee, future leader of the Hindu Mahasabha, contested the elections as an independent, and got elected from the Calcutta University constituency, by virtue of being its vice-chancellor. However, it did have significant support from within the right-wing faction of the Congress supporting Hindu revivalism who shared the paranoia about a possible state capture by Muslims, with Nehru writing in 1942; "many a Congressman was a communalist under his national cloak". Out of the 468 Muslim seats the Congress had contested just 58 of them and won only 25, 15 in North West Frontier Province, 4 in Bihar, 4 in Madras & 2 in Punjab, but the Congress refused to accept its failure in attracting Muslims & wouldn't recognise the Muslim League's claims of being the representative of Indian Muslims until Partition negotiations began in 1946. Similarly, it also failed to attract Sikh support, winning only 4 Sikh rural seats in Punjab, due to the Sikh opposition to the Communal Award. Nevertheless, the Congress persisted in its claim of being the sole legitimate representative of all Indians.

Within Bombay, Ambedkar's party won 10 out of 15 seats reserved for Dalits. Although winning 80 out of the 151 Dalit seats nationwide, the Congress was unable to win a majority of Dalit seats outside United Provinces, Bihar, Orissa & Madras, with a significant number of Dalit MLA's being elected as independents.

Of the 478 seats reserved for Muslims, the League won 111, emerging as the single largest Muslim party, but it was vastly outnumbered by independents (126) & other Muslim parties (236). The League won 29 seats in the United Provinces where it had competed for 35 out of the 66 seats for Muslims. Emerging as the single largest Muslim party in the states of Assam, United Provinces, Bombay & Madras where Muslims were in minority, it won the majority of urban Muslim seats by capitalizing over the increasing paranoia among the Muslims over a possible state capture by Hindus after independence, but in rural areas faced strong competition from independents and landlord parties. Its performance in Punjab, where it won just two of the seven seats it vied for, was unsuccessful. It performed better in Bengal, capturing 40 of the 120 seats for Muslims, winning all 6 urban Muslim seats, seats in areas where Muslims were in minority & where Muslim League supporting zamindars stood as candidates. A notable example was the Nawab family of Dhaka, whose several individuals were elected from rural Muslim seats. But the League lost a large amount of the rural Muslim support to the Krishak Praja Party & independents, who prioritised rural issues over communal ones. Hence, it could not form a government on its own in Bengal. Muslim preference was clearly represented for regional parties which were not supportive of the Congress. The Muslim League was confronted with the fact that Hindu majority provinces would be ruled by Hindus, but Muslim League would not rule the provinces with Muslim majorities. The Congress domination over the government made the prospects of federal Muslim politicians appear dismal. Regional parties kept the League out of power in those provinces with Muslim majorities while in the Hindu majority provinces it was unwanted by the Congress. Antagonised by this rebuff the League stepped up its efforts to attract a popular following.

Apart from the Congress, the only other parties able to elect members from more than one religious denomination were the Justice Party in Madras (5 Hindus including 2 Dalits, 8 Muslims & 4 Christians), the United Party in Orissa (5 Hindus inclusive of 1 Dalit & 1 Muslim), the Hindu-Sikh Nationalist Party in North West Frontier Province (4 Hindus & 3 Sikhs) & the Unionist Party in Punjab (13 Hindus inclusive of 4 Dalits, 73 Muslims inclusive of 1 woman & 2 Christians).

== Aftermath ==
The Congress ministries went on expanding civil liberties as promised in its 1931 Karachi manifesto. Draconian powers of the police were curbed, press censorship was lifted, surveillance over politicians by the CID was curtailed (although right-wing leaders like Rajagopalachari in Madras & Munshi in Bombay diverted the CID to track the activities of left-wing elements & the ever-increasing number of communists instead, the most famous incident being the detaining of left-wing Congress member Yusuf Meher Ali), political prisoners from the Cellular Jail were repatriated back, those who lost their jobs for participating in the civil disobedience movement were rehabilitated & laws were made to curb exploitation of the rural poor by moneylenders. However, due to the significant number of zamindars in the legislative bodies, the Congress governments were unable to take decisive action in amending tenancy laws. This caused resentment among the peasants, manifesting in the form of peasant agitations. Dissatisfaction with the pace of labour reforms caused massive industrial strikes in various cities. Many Dalit leaders considered the work done by the Congress governments (such as legalising temple entry & increasing scholarship) to improve conditions of the Dalits as 'token legislature'.

The Congress's assumption of power saw a massive influx of self-serving opportunists enrolling themselves as Congress members with the aim of obtaining lucrative positions in state governments & local administrative bodies. One observer notes

Congressmen were suddenly seized with a desire to capture power at all cost. So long it was a fighting machine, it was functioning on a high moral plane and followed strict moral discipline. Once they won the elections, they felt that it was time for reward for their past sacrifices....Khadi, which was the symbol of truth and non-violence, now became a qualification for its wearers to secure jobs for themselves and for their friends and families.

— B. R. Tomilson, The Indian National Congress and the Raj, 1929-1942:The Penultimate Phase

This in turn led to widespread corruption, nepotism, clientelism, abuse of power & despotism within the Congress ranks. Gandhi bemoaned this transformation of the Congress & wrote in the May 1939 issue of the Harijan

I would go to the length of giving the whole Congress organisation a decent burial, rather than put up with the corruption that is rampant

— Mahatma Gandhi

This time period also saw increased infighting within the Congress, between its socialist & Gandhian factions, beginning with the election of Bose as Congress president in its 1938 Haripura session. Gandhian leader Sardar Patel (who harboured personal enmity with Bose due to the dispute surrounding the last will of his brother Vithalbhai Patel), worked to undermine Bose's authority within the Congress. Bose's clash of ideas with Gandhi ultimately led to his resignation even after being re-elected Congress president in the next year's Tripuri session, leading to the formation of the Forward Bloc.

Although the Muslim League failed miserably in Punjab, Jinnah reached an agreement with Sikandar Hayat Khan in October 1937, called the Sikandar-Jinnah Pact, under which Muslim members of the Unionist Party were allowed to hold simultaneous membership in the Muslim League (thereby eliminating the need for a separate provincial Muslim League wing), in exchange for the Muslim League to represent the interests of the Unionist Party at the Imperial Legislative Council. Although initially seen as extremely humiliating & disadvantageous for the League, the Pact allowed the League to consolidate its influence among the rural Muslim population, following the government's violent clamp down on Ahrars & Khaksars over the escalating Shahidganj dispute. Communal riots between Muslims & Hindus in Panipat on Holi and between Muslims & Nihang Sikhs in Amritsar in that year hastened religious polarisation in the state, manifested by the formation of armed Hindu militias in the cities in opposition to the Khaksars & the paramilitary groups of the political parties (like the Muslim National Guard & Congress Seva Dal), most notably among them was the Rashtriya Swayamsevak Sangh.

In Sindh, Sir Abdullah Haroon was able to secure the mergers of the outfits led by Hidayatullah & Pir Ilahi Baksh in October 1938. He also engineered defection of 10 legislators from the Sind United Party under G. M. Syed. But Soomro survived the no-confidence motion by giving ministerial positions to the defectors. The Muslim League hastened communal polarisation caused by riots in Shikarpur in March 1937 through its agitation over the Manzilgarh dispute to discredit his government.

By late 1937, the provincial wing of the Muslim League was created in the North West Frontier Province, bolstered due to the defection of many leaders from the landlord-based Muslim Independent Party over the Congress's anti-feudal laws. In 1938 bypolls, it won 4 seats, 1 in Hazara & 3 in Haripur.

Hindu-Muslim relations continued to deteriorate after the elections, with the outbreak of religious violence in Madras, Central Provinces & Punjab throughout May 1937. In his address on 17 April 1938 at Calcutta, Jinnah accused the Congress members of collaborating with outfits like the Hindu Mahasabha & Arya Samaj in perpetuating violence against Muslims during these riots. The Muslim League sharpened its claims of Islamophobia in the Congress through the Pirpur report, Shareef report & Fazlul Haq's report titled Muslim Sufferings Under Congress Rule. Apart from allegation of collaborating with rioting Hindus, other grievances made by the Muslim League were:

1. Imposition of Vande mataram over Muslims.
2. Imposition of Hindi as a compulsory language (Note: which led to protests in Madras.) over Muslims & suppression of Urdu
3. Imposition of the Congress's tricolour flag over the Muslim population
4. Discrimination against Muslim candidates in job appointments
5. (Selectively) instigating Hindu ryots to launch peasant movements in areas where the zamindar happened to be a Muslim.
6. Banning cow-slaughter
7. Mandating veneration of Gandhi's image & ideas among Muslims studying in government-run schools.

The Congress rejected the veracity of these allegations. Rajendra Prasad openly challenged Jinnah to have the allegations verified by a judicial committee headed by Sir Maurice Gwyer, Chief Justice of the Federal Court. But the Muslim League refused to formally lodge the complaint, with Chaudhury Khaliquzzaman privately confessing that the allegations were heavily exaggerated & somewhat baseless, but it successfully created a sense of paranoia among Muslims about their future in a Hindu majority independent India. Nehru refused to attach any importance to either the Muslim League or its allegations & did nothing to dispel the sense of mistrust among the Muslim population. He did, however, launch a mass contact programme to reach the Muslims, which Jinnah exploited as a vindication of his allegations. The Pant administration in United Provinces was seen as attempting to undermine Muslim solidarity by escalating Sunni-Shia conflict through the Madh-i-Sahaba dispute.

On 3 September 1939, Viceroy of India Lord Linlithgow declared India to be at war with Nazi Germany immediately after Britain's declaration. The Congress objected strongly to the declaration of war without prior consultation with Indians in the legislatures. The Congress Working Committee suggested that it would cooperate if a central Indian national government were formed and a commitment were made to India's independence after the war. The Muslim League promised its support to the British, with Jinnah calling on Muslims to help the Empire by "honourable co-operation" at the "critical and difficult juncture", while asking the Viceroy for increased protection for Muslims.

The government did not come up with any satisfactory response. Viceroy Linlithgow could only offer to form a 'consultative committee' for advisory functions. Thus, Linlithgow refused the demands of the Congress. On 22 October 1939, all Congress ministries were called upon to tender their resignations. Both Viceroy Linlithgow and Muhammad Ali Jinnah were pleased with the resignations. On 2 December 1939, Jinnah put out an appeal, calling for Indian Muslims to celebrate 22 December 1939 as a "Day of Deliverance" from Congress:

I wish the Musalmans all over India to observe Friday 22 December as the "Day of Deliverance" and thanksgiving as a mark of relief that the Congress regime has at last ceased to function. I hope that the provincial, district and primary Muslim Leagues all over India will hold public meetings and pass the resolution with such modification as they may be advised, and after Jumma prayers offer prayers by way of thanksgiving for being delivered from the unjust Congress regime.

With the Congress out in political wilderness, Jinnah got a free rein to pursue his agenda, culminating in the Lahore Resolution in 1940 & launching of the Pakistan Movement.

== Gallery ==
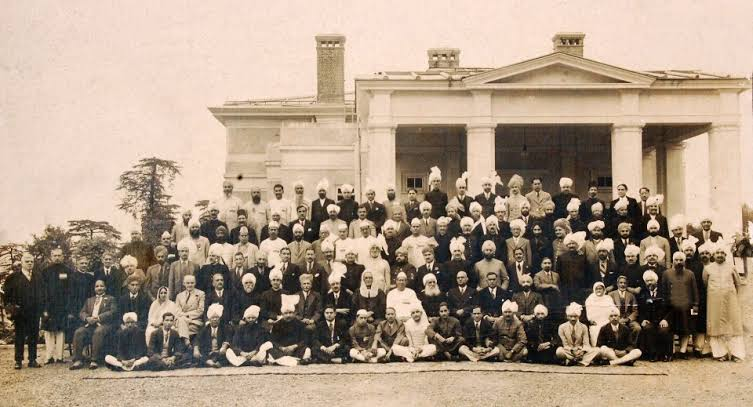
MLAs of the Punjab Legislative Assembly in 1937

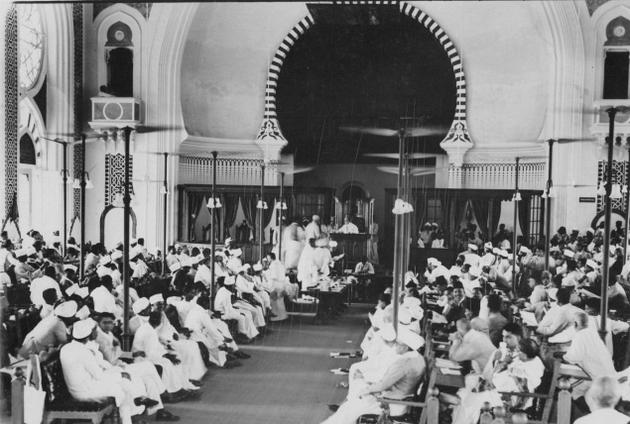
Madras Legislative Assembly session in 1937

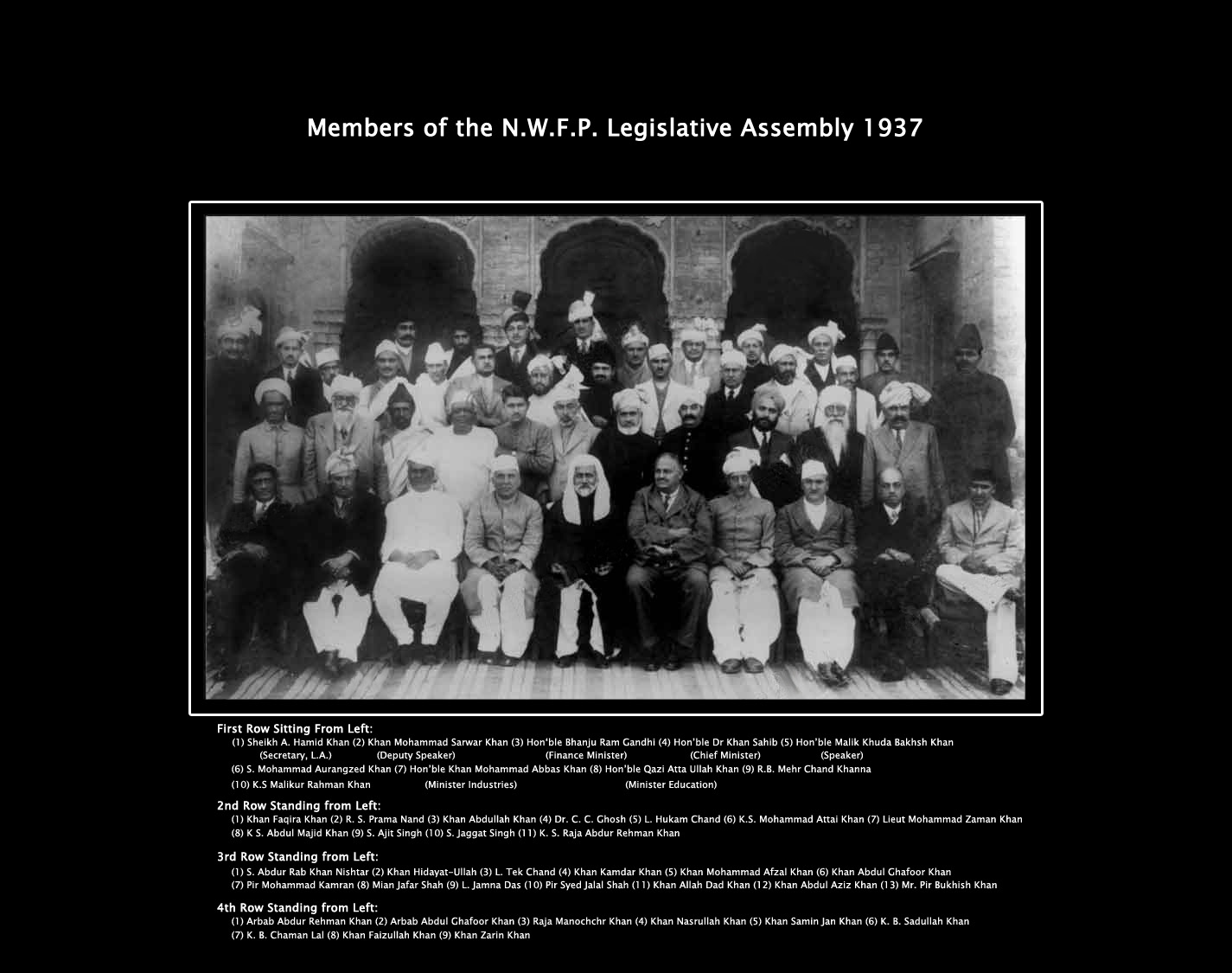
MLAs of the NWFP Legislative Assembly in 1937

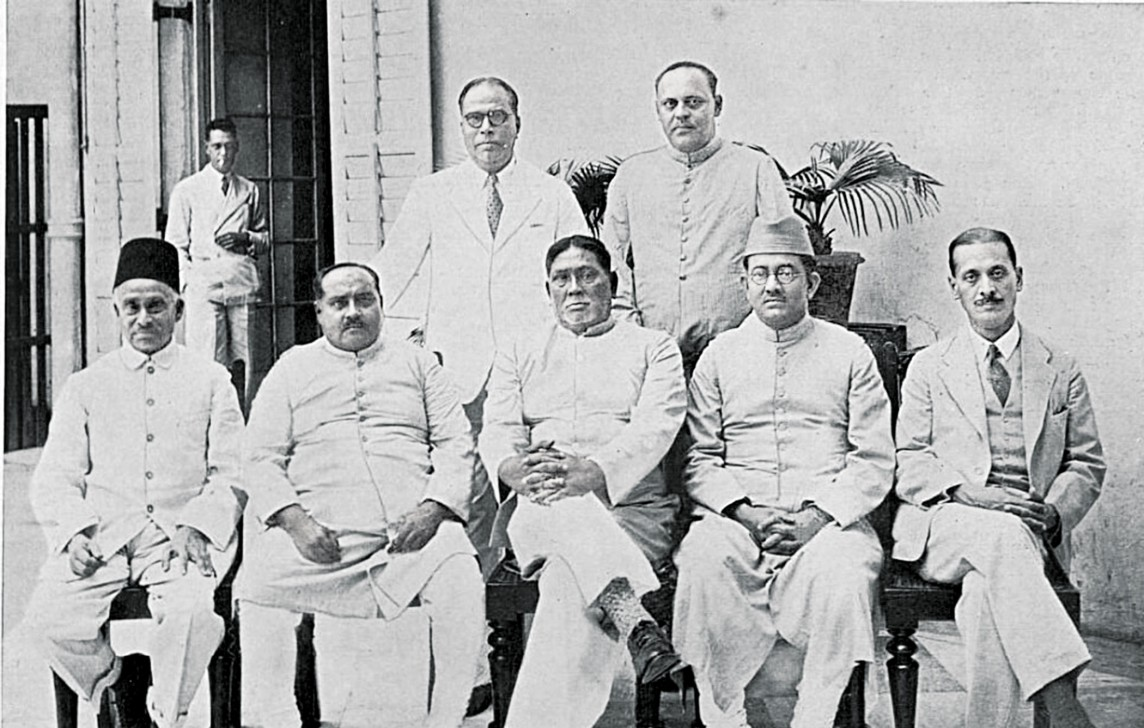
A. K. Fazlul Huq's first cabinet in 1937. Huq is seated at the centre, to his left is Khwaja Nazimuddin. Behind Huq, on the right is Sir Bijoy Prasad Singh Roy.

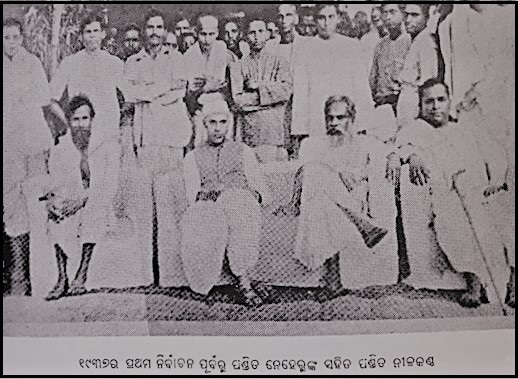
Nehru in Odisha while campaigning for the elections in 1937, accompanied by Nilakantha Das.

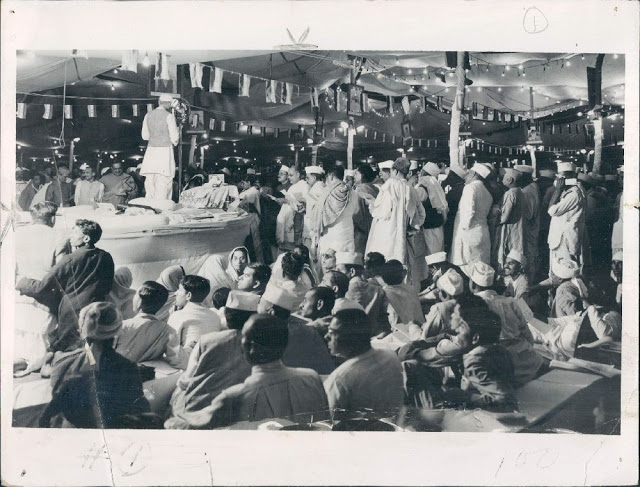
1937 AICC session in Delhi, where the decision to stake claim in provincial government formation was communicated to the newly elected Congress MLAs who had convened.

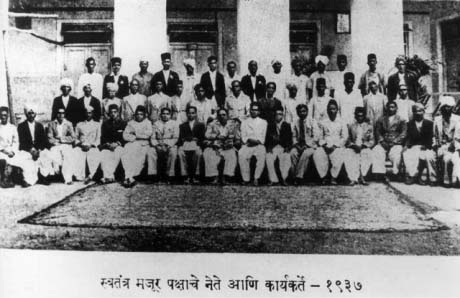
Ambedkar surrounded by the party workers of the Independent Labour Party in 1937

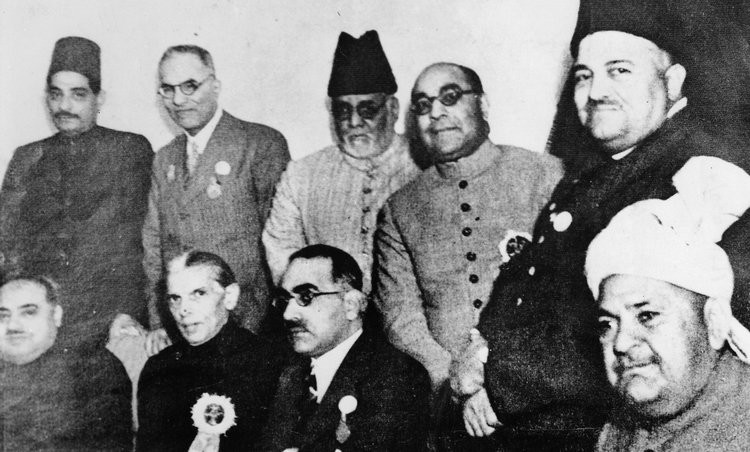
Muslim League Working Committee members in Lucknow in October 1937. From left to right are Iftikhar Hussain Khan Mamdot, Jinnah, Sir Sikandar Hayat Khan (as a guest) & Amir Muhammad Khan. Standing from right are Khwaja Nazimuddin and Liaqat Ali Khan.

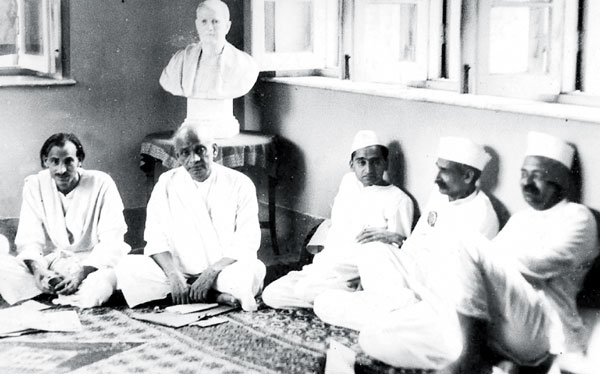
AICC session in October 1937, held at Bose's Calcutta residence. Seated from left to right are J. B. Kripalani, Sardar Patel, Achyut Patwardhan, Narendra Deva and Govind Ballabh Pant.

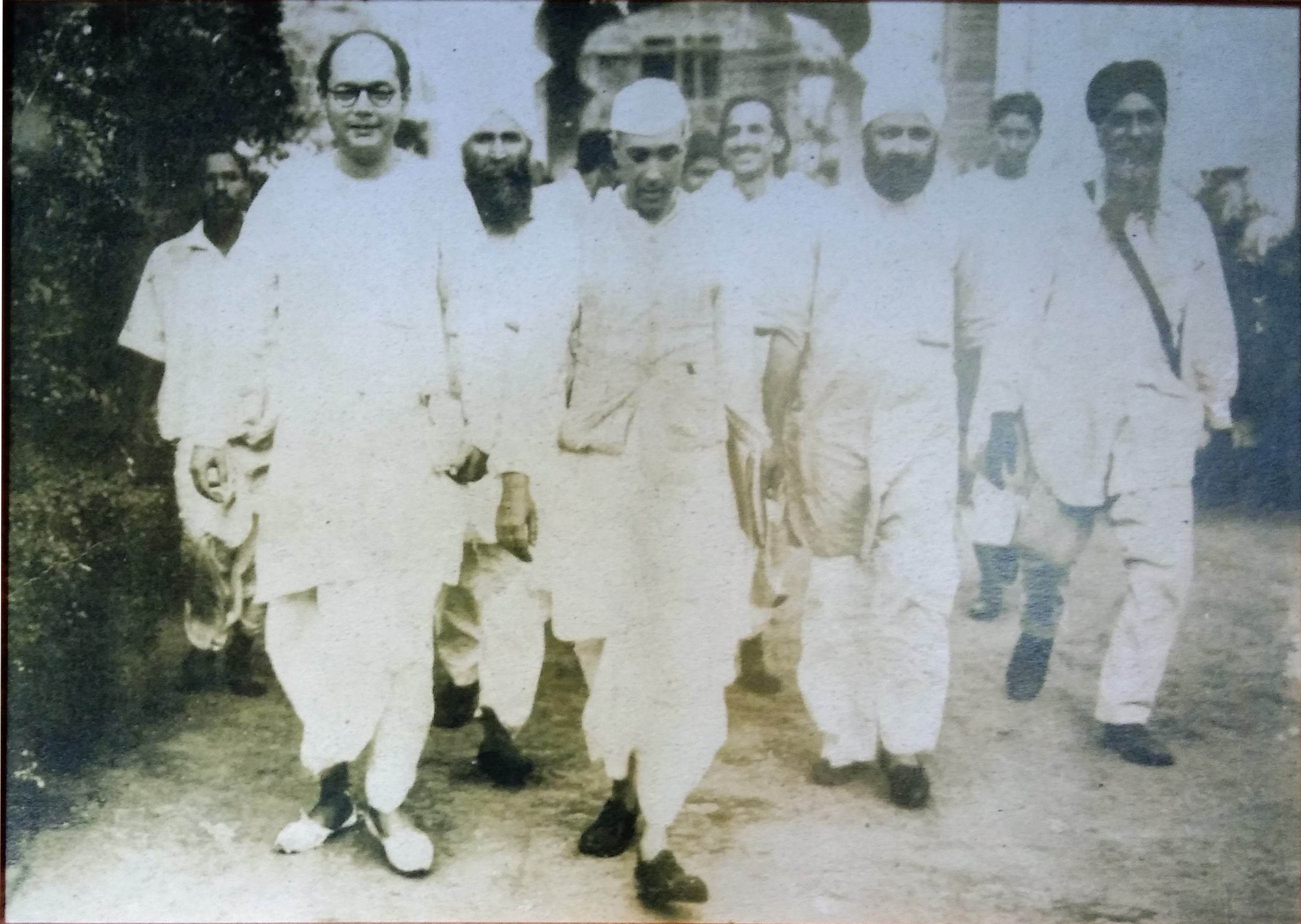
Nehru and Bose at Calcutta, proceeding to attend the above-mentioned session.
