= UPPA =

UPPA may refer to:

- University of Pau and Pays de l'Adour, in south-western France
- United People's Party of Assam, political party in Indian state of Assam

Uppa may refer to:

- Alternate name for Hoopa, California
- Taina Uppa (born 1976), Finnish javelin thrower
