= Jahan Uddin Ahmed =

Indian politician

- Portrait of Jahan Uddin Ahmed

Member of Parliament, Lok Sabha
- In office 1938–1967
- Constituency: Dhubri Lok Sabha constituency

Personal details
- Born: 11 February 1904 Gauhati, Assam
- Party: Praja Socialist Party
- Spouse: Johora Khatoon
- Children: 13

Jahan Uddin Ahmed, also known as Maulavi Jahan Uddin Ahmed, was an Indian politician of Praja Socialist Party and Member of parliament elected during the 4th General elections in 1967. He contested elections from Dhubri Lok sabha constituency, Assam.

== Life and background ==
Jahan was born on 11 February 1904 in Assam state. He did his education from Cotton University and in modern-day BRM Government Law College where he received his Bachelor of Science and Bachelor of Laws. Before he established his political associations with Praja Socialist party, he was associated to United People's Party of Assam. He served Secretary of parliament for Department of revenue and Department for Education to the Government of Assam in 1938. He also served as the Member of the Legislative Assembly from 1938 to 1961, and then participated in parliamentary elections in 1967.

== Personal life ==
Jahan was born to Arabuddin Muhamed and was married on 1 June 1925 to Johora Khatoon. He had three sons and ten daughters.
