= E. Raghavendra Rao =

Indian politician, independence activist

Dr. E. Raghavendra Rao

Chief Minister of Central Provinces and Berar
- In office 1928–1936

Minister of Education, Central Provinces and Berar
- In office 1926–1936

Members of the Central Legislative Assembly of India
- In office 1921–1926

Acting governor of Central Provinces
- In office May 1936 – September 1936

Personal details
- Born: 4 August 1889 Kamptee, Nagpur, British India
- Died: 15 June 1942 (aged 52)
- Party: Swaraj Party; Swatantra Congress Party; Indian National Congress
- Occupation: Lawyer, Politician, Freedom Fighter
- Profession: Lawyer, Politician, Freedom Fighter

Dr. E. Raghavendra Rao (4 August 1889 – 15 June 1942) was an Indian lawyer, politician, and freedom fighter. He served as a member of the Central Legislative Assembly from 1921 to 1926, held the position of minister of education for the Central Provinces and Berar from 1926 to 1936, was the chief minister from 1928 to 1936, and acted as Governor of Central Provinces in the British administration, during the governor's absence from May to September 1936. He was known for his involvement in the Indian independence movement.

== Biography ==
Raghavendra Rao was born on 4 August 1889 in Kamptee, Nagpur. His family later relocated to Raipur-Bilaspur. He completed his education in Nagpur and pursued legal studies in England, where he became a barrister. He began his legal practice in Bilaspur in 1914.

He was became involved in local politics and was elected as the president of the Bilaspur District Council in 1916. In 1917, he founded the Bilaspur Home Rule League. He participated in the May 1920 session of the Bilaspur District Congress Committee, where he opposed the British government's oppressive policies.

During the 1920s, he engaged in the Non-Cooperation Movement and resigned from his legal practice. He was elected as the president of the Mahakoshal Provincial Congress Committee and traveled extensively to promote the movement. He was arrested in 1922 during a Congress meeting in Raipur.

In 1921, Raghavendra Rao won a seat in the Central Legislative Assembly but resigned to align with the Congress's principles. He joined the Swaraj Party and was elected to the Central Provinces Legislative Council in 1923. In 1926, he established the Swatantra Congress Party. He served as the minister of education for Central Provinces and Berar state. He later held the position of chief minister from 1928 to 1936. He also served as the Home Minister of the state.

In May 1936, he acted as the governor of the state during the governor's leave, serving until September 1936. He was re-elected to the Legislative Council in 1937 and appointed to the viceroy's Executive Council in 1941. Rao died on 15 June 1942 at 52.
