= Mukunda Prasad Das (politician) =

Speaker of the Odisha Legislative Assembly
- In office 28 July 1937 – 29 May 1946
- Deputy Speaker: Nanda Kishore Das
- Preceded by: position established
- Succeeded by: Lal Mohan Patnaik

Personal details
- Born: 12 August 1893
- Died: 7 November 1969 (aged 76)
- Occupation: Politician, Lawyer

Mukunda Prasad Das (12 August 1893 – 7 November 1969) was an Indian Lawyer and politician. Das had served as the First Pre-independence Speaker of the Odisha Legislative Assembly from 28 July 1937 to 29 May 1946.
