= Mahboob Ali Baig Sahib Bahadur =

Member of the Constituent Assembly of India

Personal details
- Born: Madras

Mahboob Ali Baig Sahib Bahadur, also known as Mahboob Ali Baig, was an indian politician. He was the member of Constituent Assembly of India from Madras since 14 July 1947 to 24 January 1950. He played a key role in making Muslim personal law Act 1937.
