= Bhojsing Gurdinomal Pahalajani =

Indian politician

Bhojsing Gurdinomal Pahalajani (d. February 1938) was an Indian politician and the first speaker of the Sind legislative assembly. He was elected to the Sind Legislative Assembly in 1937, from Sukkur. After the election, he was elected speaker of the assembly with 40 votes.

Bhojsing Gurdinomal Pahalajani died in February 1938.
