= Pirpur, Mainpuri =

Village in Uttar Pradesh, India

Pirpur
- Village
- Location in Uttar Pradesh, India
- Coordinates: 27.27797°N 79.04841°E
- Country: India
- State: Uttar Pradesh
- District: Mainpuri
- Tehsil: Mainpuri

Area
  - Total: 0.994 km^{2} (0.384 sq mi)

Population (2011)
  - Total: 623
  - Density: 627/km^{2} (1,620/sq mi)
- Time zone: UTC+5:30 (IST)

Pirpur (Pīrpur) is a village in Mainpuri block of Mainpuri district, Uttar Pradesh, India. As of 2011, it had a population of 623, in 86 households.

== Demographics ==
As of 2011, Pirpur had a population of 623, in 86 households. This population was 52.6% male (328) and 47.4% female (295). The 0-6 age group numbered 91 (51 male and 40 female), or 14.6% of the total population. 71 residents were members of Scheduled Castes, or 11.4% of the total.

The 1981 census recorded Pirpur as having a population of 345 people, in 50 households.

The 1961 census recorded Pirpur as comprising 1 hamlet, with a total population of 237 people (128 male and 109 female), in 47 households and 29 physical houses. The area of the village was given as 245 acres.

== Infrastructure ==
As of 2011, Pirpur had 1 primary school; it did not have any healthcare facilities. Drinking water was provided by hand pump and tube well/borehole; there were no public toilets. The village had a post office but no public library; there was at least some access to electricity for all purposes. Streets were made of both kachcha and pakka materials.
