= Ram Prasad Tamta =

Indian politician

Member of Parliament, Rajya Sabha
- In office 1952–1958
- Constituency: Uttar Pradesh

Personal details
- Born: 5 October 1909
- Died: 19 February 1979 (aged 69)
- Party: Indian National Congress

Ram Prasad Tamta was an Indian politician. He was a Member of Parliament representing Uttar Pradesh in the Rajya Sabha the upper house of India's Parliament as member of the Indian National Congress.
