= N. S. Varadachari =

Indian freedom fighter

Nadadur Sadhu Varadachari (25 January 1897 – 1980) was an Indian freedom fighter, author, and politician. Known as "No Shirt" Varadachari, he was a disciple of Mahatma Gandhi and actively participated in various satyagraha movements.

== Early life and education ==
Nadadur Sadhu Varadachari was born on 25 January 1897 in Tenali near Tirupati. He was the son of N. S. Anantachari and Singarammal. Varadachari attended Triplicane Hindu High School, where he was a student of V.S. Srinivasa Sastri. He then studied at Madras Presidency College under the tutelage of Dr. Sarvepalli Radhakrishnan, earning his Honours in History and Economics. In 1918, he completed his Law degree.

== Gandhian influence ==
On 13 August 1920, Varadachari, along with K. Santhanam and a few other young men, attended a gathering at Jamma Masjid in Triplicane. During this event, Mahatma Gandhi urged the audience to boycott foreign clothes, titles, schools, and law courts. Inspired by Gandhi's plea, Varadachari abandoned his legal career and participated in the Gandhian struggle.

A close disciple of Mahatma Gandhi, Varadachari, along with Undam Baker, authored the work "Kairattu" (meaning "spinning wheel"), which was translated into English as "Hand Spinning and Weaving". This book was published in 1926. Varadachari was appointed as the editor of Young India, a newspaper run by Mahatma Gandhi.

== Political career ==
In 1934, Varadachari presided over the Madras District Political Conference. In 1937, when the first Congress Ministry was formed by Rajaji, he was made Parliament Secretary. He took a leading part in the Nagpur Flag Satyagraha movement and the Vedaranyam Salt Satyagraha. In later years, he left Congress and joined the Swatantra Party.

Post-independence, Varadachari served as a member of the Legislative Assembly from the Triplicane constituency and served as a cabinet minister.
