= Syed Abdur Rouf =

Syed Abdur Rouf, also known as Maulavi Abdur Rouf, was a member of the Constituent Assembly of India representing Assam. He also served in the Assam Legislative Assembly.

From 7 to 8 April 1944, Rouf was the chairperson of the Reception Committee of 3rd annual conference of the Assam Provincial Muslim League. He was a leader of immigrant Muslims in Assam.
