= Jawaharlal Rohatgi =

Indian politician

Member of Parliament, Rajya Sabha
- In office 1962-1964
- Constituency: Uttar Pradesh

Personal details
- Party: Indian National Congress

Jawaharlal Rohatgi was an Indian politician. He was a Member of Parliament, representing Uttar Pradesh in the Rajya Sabha the upper house of India's Parliament as a member of the Indian National Congress.
