= United People's Party of Assam =

Former political party in India

United People's Party of Assam was a political party in the Indian state of Assam. UPPA was an ally of Asom Gana Parishad and took part in an AGP-led government in the state. On 17 December 2000 UPPA merged with Samajwadi Party. In April 2001, AGP broke ties with all the left parties and joined an alliance with the Bharatiya Janata Party before the elections.
