= Muslim nationalism in South Asia =

From a historical perspective, Professor Ishtiaq Ahmed of the Stockholm University and Professor Shamsul Islam of the University of Delhi classified the Muslims of Colonial India into two categories during the era of the Indian independence movement: nationalist Muslims (Indian Muslims who opposed the partition of India and aligned with Indian nationalism) and Muslim nationalists (individuals who desired to create a separate country for Indian Muslims). The All India Azad Muslim Conference represented nationalist Muslims, while the All-India Muslim League represented the Muslim nationalists. One such popular debate was the Madani–Iqbal debate.

== Historical foundations ==
During the medieval era, an Islamic society existed in India that originated from Persianate culture that spread the religion amongst Indians, resulting from the rise of powerful Muslim kingdoms such as the Delhi Sultanate and the Mughal Empire. The Islamisation of India resulted in the birth of Indo-Muslim culture, which assimilated many aspects of Indian culture in customs, social manners, architecture, painting and music, and established its separate identity from other Muslim peoples, being essentially Indo-Persian in character. The assumption of some Muslims in colonial India of belonging to a separate identity, and therefore, having a right to their own country, also rested on their pre-eminent claim to political power, which flowed from the experience of Muslim administrative rule in India. According to the historian Qureshi, these Muslim nationalists thought that the distinctiveness of Muslim India could only be maintained by the political domination of the Muslims over the Hindus. Any sharing of political power with the Hindus was considered dangerous and the first step towards the political abdication of the Indian Muslims.

== In politics ==
Some prominent Muslims politically sought a base for themselves, separate from Hindus and other Indian nationalists, who espoused the Indian National Congress. Muslim scholars, religious leaders and politicians founded the All India Muslim League in 1906.

Muslims comprised 25% of pre-independence India's collective population (British India including princely states). Some Muslim leaders felt that their cultural and economic contributions to India's heritage and life merited a significant role for Muslims in a future independent India's governance and politics.

A movement led by Allama Iqbal and ultimately Muhammad Ali Jinnah, who originally fought for Muslim rights within India, later felt a separate homeland must be obtained for India's Muslims in order to achieve prosperity. They espoused the Two-Nation Theory, that India was in fact home to the Muslim and Hindu nations, who were distinct in every way.

In contrast, another section of Muslim society, led by Khan Abdul Ghaffar Khan, Mukhtar Ahmed Ansari and Maulana Azad felt that participation in the Indian Independence Movement and the Indian National Congress was a patriotic duty of all Muslims. The Deobandi strain of Islamic theology also advocated a notion of composite nationalism in which Hindus and Muslims were seen as one nation united in the struggle against British colonial rule in undivided India. In 1919, a large group of Deobandi scholars formed the political party Jamiat Ulema-e-Hind and it maintained a position of opposing the partition of India. Deobandi Islamic scholar Hussain Ahmad Madani helped to spread these ideas through his text Muttahida Qaumiyat Aur Islam.

== Muslim separatism and partition of India ==
Muhammad Ali Jinnah led the Muslim League's call for Pakistan. As time went on, communal tensions rose and so partition won increasing support among many Muslims in Muslim-majority areas of the British India.

On 14 August 1947, Pakistan was created out of the Muslim majority provinces of British India: Sindh, the western parts of Punjab, Balochistan and the North West Frontier Province, and the eastern parts of Bengal. Communal violence broke out and millions of people were forced to flee their homes and many died. Hindus and Sikhs fled from Pakistan to India and Muslims fled from India to Pakistan.

However, because Muslim communities existed throughout South Asia, independence actually left tens of millions of Muslims within the boundaries of the secular Indian state. As per 2011 Census, approximately 14.2% of the population of India is Muslim.

The Muslim League idea of a Muslim Nationalism encompassing all the Muslims of the Indian subcontinent seemed to lose out to ethnic nationalism in 1971, when East Pakistan, a Bengali dominated province, fought for their independence from Pakistan, and became the independent country of Bangladesh.

== Pakistani nationalism ==
Pakistan was created on the basis of the religious nationalism of some Muslims in Colonial India, who propagated the idea that Indian Muslims and Indian Hindus are two separate nations, and therefore Muslims should have a separate homeland within the Indian subcontinent. Pakistani nationalism refers to the political, cultural, linguistic, historical, religious and geographical expression of patriotism by the people of Pakistan, of pride in the history, culture, identity, heritage and religious identity of Pakistan, and visions for its future. Pakistan nationalism is the direct outcome of Muslim nationalism, which emerged in India in the 19th century. Its intellectual pioneer was Sir Syed Ahmad Khan. Unlike the secular nationalism of other countries, Pakistani nationalism and the religion of Islam are not mutually exclusive and religion is a part of the Pakistani nationalist narrative. During the late years of British rule and leading up to independence, it had three distinct supporters:

1. Idealists, such as majority of Muslim students and intellectuals, inspired by the Aligarh Movement and Allama Iqbal, driven by a fear of being engulfed in "false secularism" that would assimilate their beliefs, culture and heritage and Islamic ideology into a common system that defied Islamic civic tenets and ideals while hoping to create a state where their higher education, reformist Islamist ideology and wealth would keep them in power over the other Muslims of India.
2. Realists, driven by political inflexibility demonstrated by the Indian National Congress, feared a systematic disenfranchisement of Muslims. This also included many members of the Parsi, and Nizari Ismaili communities.
3. Traditionalists, primarily lower Orthodoxy (Barelvi), that feared the dominative power of the upper Orthodoxy (Deoband) and saw Pakistan as a safe haven to prevent their domination by State-controlled propaganda. However, many upper Orthodoxy (such as Shabbir Ahmad Usmani and Ashraf Ali Thanwi) also supported the state in the interests of an Islamic Republic.

== Muslim nationalism in India ==
According to official government statistics, the Hindu-majority India has almost 14% Muslim population spread across all states with significant concentrations in Uttar Pradesh, Bihar, Telangana, Assam, West Bengal, Gujarat, Kerala and Jammu and Kashmir. It is the third-largest home to Muslims after Indonesia and Pakistan and the second-largest home to Shia Muslims.

Since independence, there has been a great deal of conflict within the various Muslim communities as to how to best function within the complex political and cultural mosaic that defines Indian politics in India today.

All in all, Muslim perseverance in sustaining their continued advancement along with Government efforts to focus on Pakistan as the primary problem for Indian Muslims in achieving true minority rights has created a sometimes extreme support for Indian nationalism, giving the Indian State much-needed credibility in projecting a strong secular image throughout the rest of the world.

The Jamiat Ulema-e-Hind, a leading Indian Islamic organisation has propounded a theological basis for Indian Muslims' nationalistic philosophy. Their thesis is that Muslims and non-Muslims have entered upon a mutual contract in India since independence, to establish a secular state. The Constitution of India represents this contract. This is known in Urdu as a mu'ahadah. Accordingly, as the Muslim community's elected representatives supported and swore allegiance to this mu'ahadah so the specific duty of Muslims is to keep loyalty to the Constitution. This mu'ahadah is similar to a previous similar contract signed between the Muslims and the Jews in Medina.

Muslim nationalism in India refers to a modern political ideology that emerged during British colonial rule, which sought to define Muslims of the Indian subcontinent as a distinct political community with separate collective interests. Prior to colonial intervention, Indian Muslims did not constitute a nation in the modern sense; political allegiance was oriented toward dynastic rule, local authority, religious institutions, and regional identities rather than national categories. The rise of Muslim nationalism was closely linked to the political, social, and administrative transformations introduced by colonial governance, particularly after the Indian Rebellion of 1857, which led to the decline of pre-colonial Muslim political elites and intensified communal classification through censuses, electoral representation, and legal frameworks. Early articulations of Muslim political identity were largely elite-driven and focused on securing political safeguards within a representative system, reflecting concerns about educational and economic disadvantages and the implications of numerical majority rule. Sir Syed Ahmad Khan emphasized communal representation rather than territorial separation, while the All-India Muslim League, founded in 1906, institutionalized Muslim political organization at the national level, though it did not command uniform support among Indian Muslims. Significant Muslim intellectual, religious, and political groups opposed Muslim nationalism and instead advocated composite Indian nationalism. By the 1930s and 1940s, Muslim nationalism increasingly took the form of the Two-Nation Theory, which argued that Muslims and Hindus constituted separate nations on the basis of religious and cultural differences; historians generally characterize this argument as a political response to colonial electoral structures rather than a theological doctrine. The Partition of India in 1947 revealed the internal limitations of Muslim nationalism, as a substantial proportion of Muslims remained in India and the newly created state of Pakistan later experienced fragmentation along linguistic and regional lines, culminating in the establishment of Bangladesh in 1971. In post-independence India, Muslim nationalism lost much of its political relevance as the Constitution of India guaranteed religious freedom, equal citizenship, and political participation, leading Indian Muslim political discourse to shift toward minority rights, social inclusion, and constitutional protections. Contemporary scholarship broadly views Muslim nationalism in India as a historically contingent phenomenon shaped by colonial conditions rather than an inevitable expression of Islamic belief or identity. References: Ayesha Jalal, The Sole Spokesman: Jinnah, the Muslim League, and the Demand for Pakistan (Cambridge University Press, 1985); Barbara D. Metcalf and Thomas R. Metcalf, A Concise History of Modern India (Cambridge University Press, 2012); Gyanendra Pandey, The Construction of Communalism in Colonial North India (Oxford University Press, 1990); Mushirul Hasan, Nationalism and Communal Politics in India (Manohar, 1991); Ian Talbot and Gurharpal Singh, The Partition of India (Cambridge University Press, 2009).

== South Asian Muslim leaders during British Raj ==
Revolutionaries

- Titumir
- Haji Shariatullah
- Dudu Miyan

Reformers

- Syed Ahmad Khan
- Syed Amir Ali
- Muhammad Ali
- Shaukat Ali
- Nawabs of Bhopal
- Nawabs of Dhaka
- Begum Rokeya

Indian independence activists and Indian nationalists

- Badruddin Tyabji
- Mukhtar Ahmed Ansari
- Maulana Azad
- Saifuddin Kitchlew
- Maghfoor Ahmad Ajazi
- Hakim Ajmal Khan
- Abbas Tyabji
- Rafi Ahmed Kidwai
- Mahmud Hasan Deobandi
- Abdul Gaffar Khan
- Hussain Ahmad Madani

Pakistan Movement

- Muhammad Ali Jinnah
- Muhammad Iqbal
- Liaquat Ali Khan
- Abdur Rab Nishtar
- Huseyn Shaheed Suhrawardy
- A. K. Fazlul Huq
- Jahanara Shahnawaz
- Shamsul Haque Faridpuri

Traditionalists

- Syed Rafi Mohammad
- Abul A'la Maududi
- Ahmed Raza Khan Barelvi
- Mohammad Abdul Ghafoor Hazarvi
- Ashraf Ali Thanwi

== See also ==
- Islam in South Asia
- Madani–Iqbal debate
- Hindu nationalism
- Bangladeshi nationalism

== Bibliography ==
- Arrow of a Blue-Skinned God by Jonah Blank
- Patel: A Life by Rajmohan Gandhi
- India and Pakistan in War and Peace by J.N. Dixit
