= Indian reunification =

Concept of the potential reunification of India, Pakistan and Bangladesh

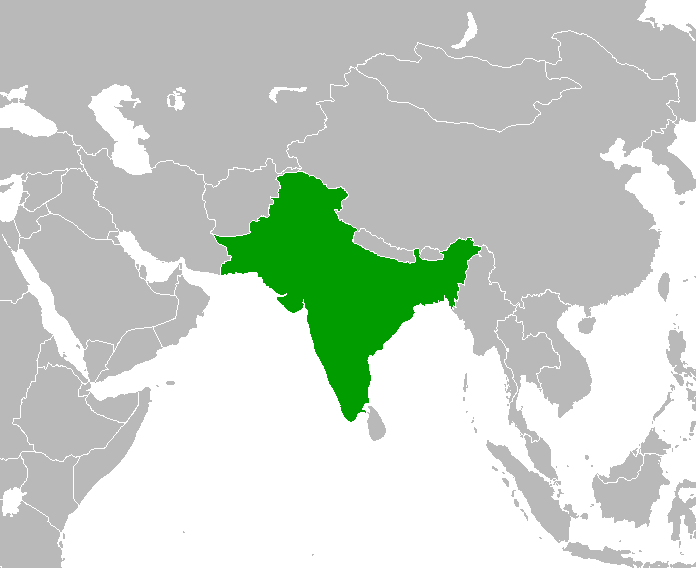
India in 1947, before the partition, included the modern Republic of India, along with the land that became Islamic Republic of Pakistan and People's Republic of Bangladesh.

Indian reunification refers to the hypothetical reunification of India with Pakistan and Bangladesh, which were partitioned from British India in 1947.

== Background ==
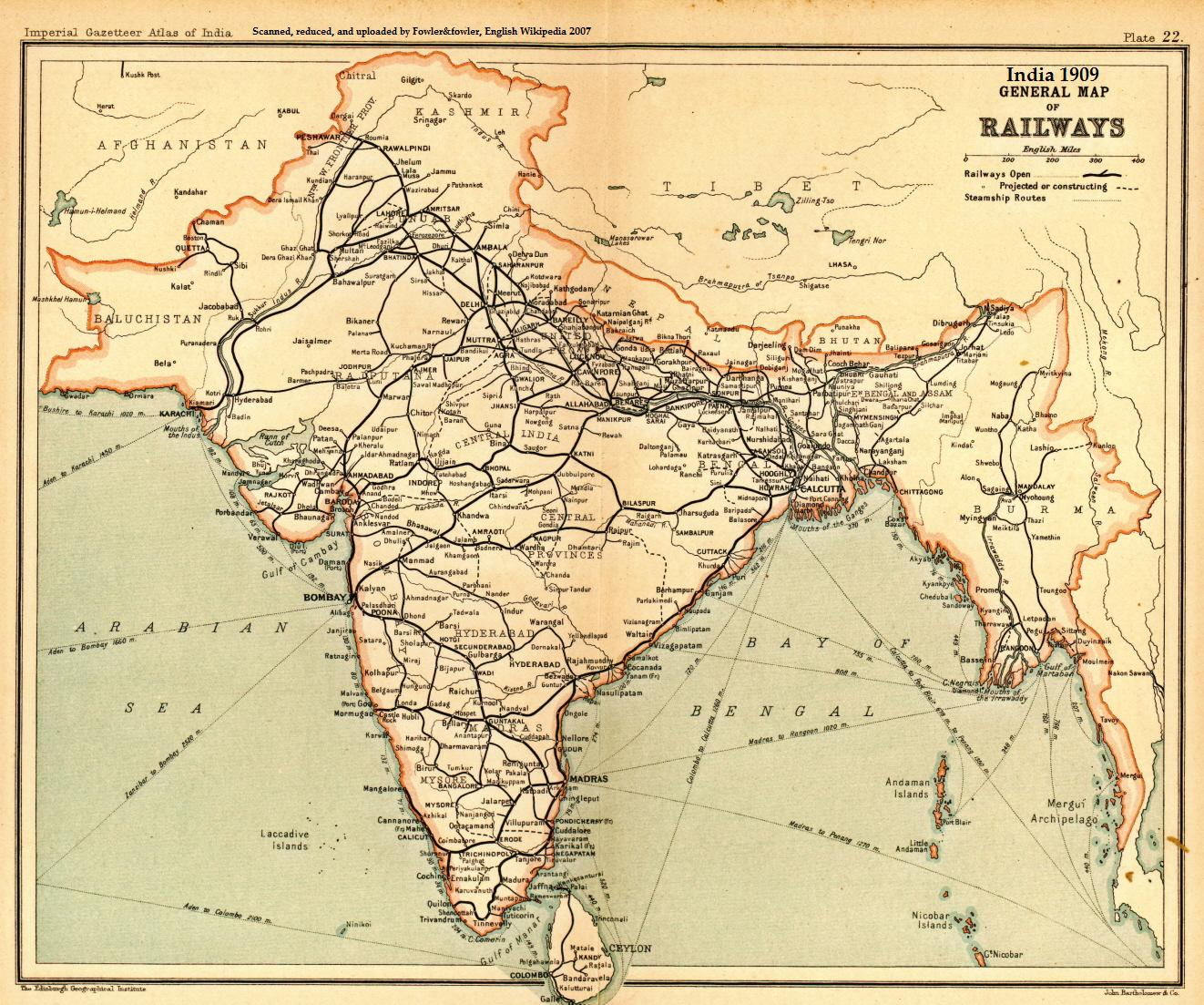
Map of British India (1909)

In 1947, British India was partitioned into the modern Dominion of India and the Dominion of Pakistan, the latter of which included northwest India and part of eastern India. Those who opposed it often adhered to the doctrine of composite nationalism in the Indian subcontinent. The Indian National Congress, as well as the All India Azad Muslim Conference, opposed the partition of India; the president of the All India Azad Muslim Conference and Chief Minister of Sind, Shadeed Allah Bakhsh Soomro, stated that "No power on earth can rob anyone of his faith and convictions, and no power on earth shall be permitted to rob Indian Muslims of their just rights as Indian nationals." Khaksar Movement leader Allama Mashriqi opposed the partition of India because he felt that if Muslims and Hindus had largely lived peacefully together in India for centuries, they could also do so in a free and united India (cf. Hindu–Muslim unity). Mashriqi claimed the two-nation theory was a British plot to maintain control of the region more easily, if India was divided into two countries that were pitted against one another. He reasoned that a division of India along religious lines would breed fundamentalism and extremism on both sides of the border. Mashriqi thought that "Muslim majority areas were already under Muslim rule, so if any Muslims wanted to move to these areas, they were free to do so without having to divide the country." To him, separatist leaders "were power hungry and misleading Muslims in order to bolster their own power by serving the British agenda."

The author of Composite Nationalism and Islam, Hussain Ahmad Madani, a Deobandi Muslim scholar and proponent of a united India, argued that in order to maintain their divide-and-rule policies, the British colonial government were attempting to "scare Muslims into imagining that in a free India, Muslims would lose their separate identity and be absorbed into the Hindu fold", a threat that "aim[ed] at depoliticizing the Muslims, weaning them away from struggle for independence." In the view of Madani, support for a two-nation theory would result in the entrenchment of British colonial rule.

The pro-separatist All-India Muslim League, on the other hand, campaigned for a separate country, Pakistan, and their demand for the partition of India took place. Since that time, various individuals and political parties, as well as religious groups have called for Indian reunification.

Mahatma Gandhi, for example, had wished to settle in Noakhali in order to start a campaign for Indian reunification among the Muslim community of Pakistan.

Indian nationalists felt that following the departure of the British from the Indian subcontinent, Pakistan would destabilize and reunite with India; both the British, as well as the Indian National Congress thus thought it would be best for the British to leave sooner. On the other hand, Muhammad Ali Jinnah of the Muslim League wished to delay the departure of the British as he felt that it would allow the newly created state of Pakistan to receive its share of joint assets.

In August 1953, several newspapers in India reported that meetings held on United India Day presented Indian reunification as the goal of patriots. One of them, Parbhat wrote that: "Pakistani leaders are well aware of the fact that the majority of the Indian population does not accept the partition of 1947 and will come out in the open to do away with it at the first opportunity."

In the 1950s, the Sri Aurobindo Sevak Sangha included in their programme "Annulment of the ill-fated partition and reunification of India." On 4 February 4, 1957, the Muslim League's Morning News published an article stating that "there is a party even in Pakistan which is working for reunification and it is growing in strength", with reference to the Awami League, possibly in an attempt to lambast it.

The Secretary of State for India, the Earl of Listowel, remarked that "It is greatly to be hoped that when the disadvantages of separation have become apparent in the light of experience, the two Dominions will freely decide to reunite in a single Indian Dominion, which might achieve that position among the nations of the world to which its territories and resources would entitle it."

The subject of undoing the partition and reunifying India has been discussed by both Indians and Pakistanis, especially in recent times.

== Views ==
=== Academics ===
Arvind Sharma (Professor of Comparative Religion at McGill University), Harvey Cox (Professor of Divinity at Harvard University), Manzoor Ahmad (Professor at Concordia University) and Rajendra Singh (Professor of Linguistics at the Université de Montréal) have stated that the malaise and sectarian violence within South Asia is a consequence of the partition of India, which took place without a referendum in pre-1947 colonial India; these professors have stated that "Inhabitants of the subcontinent of India are poignantly reminded at this moment of the grave injustice that was done to them in 1947, when British India was partitioned without taking the wishes of its inhabitants into account." Sharma, Cox, Ahmad and Singh further expressed "regret that the fate of a quarter of the population of the globe was decided arbitrarily by the representative of an imperial power and by those who were not even duly elected by adult franchise." In view of this, Sharma, Cox, Ahmad and Singh in The New York Times in 1992 demanded that "a plebiscite be held over the entire territory that comprised British India on the question of its partition into India and Pakistan." These professors argued that "As the Kashmir problem is ineluctably tied to the partition of India, all Indians should have had a say in their future in the India that preceded partition."

=== Political thinkers ===
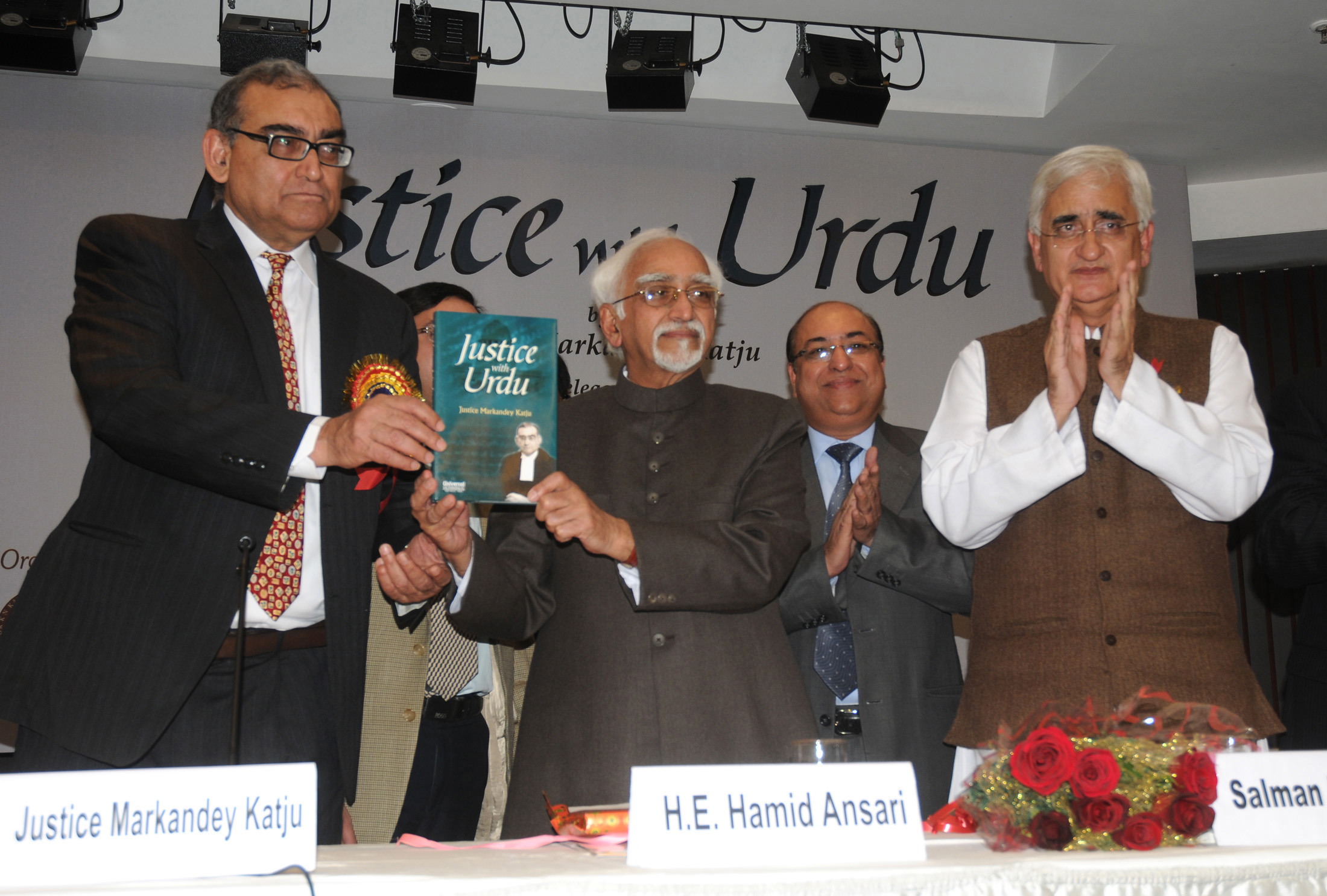
Markandey Katju, former Justice of the Supreme Court of India, serves as the Chairman of the Indian Reunification Association (IRA).

In The Nation, Kashmiri Indian thinker Markandey Katju has advocated the reunification of India with Pakistan under a secular government. Katju claimed that the primary causes of the partition were divide-and-rule policies of the British colonial government, which were implemented after Hindus and Muslims joined forces to fight against the rule of the East India Company during the Indian Rebellion of 1857. Katju serves as the chairman of the Indian Reunification Association (IRA), which seeks to campaign for this cause.

Pakistani historian Nasim Yousaf, the grandson of Allama Mashriqi, has also championed Indian Reunification and presented the idea at the New York Conference on Asian Studies on 9 October 2009 at Cornell University; Yousaf stated that the partition of India itself was a result of the divide-and-rule policies of the British government that sought to create another buffer state between the Soviet Union and India to prevent the spread of Communism, as well the fact that a "division of the people and territory would prevent a united India from emerging as a world power and keep the two nations dependent on pivotal powers." Yousaf cited former Indian National Congress president Maulana Abul Kalam Azad, who wrote in the same vein:

If a united India had become free...there was little chance that Britain could retain her position in the economic and industrial life of India. The partition of India, in which the Muslim majority provinces formed a separate and independent state, would, on the other hand, give Britain a foothold in India. A state dominated by the Muslim League would offer a permanent sphere of influence to the British. This was also bound to influence the attitude of India. With a British base in Pakistan, India would have to pay far greater attention to British interests than she might otherwise do. ... The partition of India would materially alter the situation in favour of the British.

Yousaf holds that "Muhammad Ali Jinnah, the President of the All-India Muslim League and later founder of Pakistan, had been misleading the Muslim community in order to go down in history as the saviour of the Muslim cause and to become founder and first Governor General of Pakistan." Allama Mashriqi, a nationalist Muslim, thus saw Jinnah as "becoming a tool in British hands for his political career." Besides the pro-separatist Muslim League, Islamic leadership in British India rejected the notion of partitioning the country, exemplified by the fact that most Muslims in the heartland of the subcontinent remained where they were, rather than migrating to newly created state of Pakistan. India and Pakistan are currently allocating a significant amount of their budget into military spending—money that could be spent in economic and social development. Poverty, homelessness, illiteracy, terrorism and a lack of medical facilities, in Yousaf's eyes, would not be plaguing an undivided India as it would be more advantaged "economically, politically, and socially." Yousaf has stated that Indians and Pakistanis speak a common lingua franca, Hindustani, "wear the same dress, eat the same food, enjoy the same music and movies, and communicate in the same style and on a similar wavelength". He argues that uniting would be a challenge, though not impossible, citing the fall of the Berlin Wall and the consequent German Reunification as an example.

French journalist François Gautier wrote that:

Kashmir may hold the key to India's reunification with Pakistan, whether by force or by mutual consent. For that is the crux of the problem: as long as Pakistan and India are divided there will be other Kashmirs, other Ayodhyas, other wars with Pakistan--nuclear maybe--and India will never be at peace with its own Muslim community, which is a permanent danger to herself. For India and Pakistan Are one. Yet they are two different entities, each one with its own personality. Remember Sri Aurobindo's words in 1947, "The old communal division into Hindu and Muslim seems to have hardened into the figure of a permanent division of the country. It is hoped that the Congress and the nation will not accept the settled fact as for ever settled, or as anything more than a temporary expedient. For if it lasts, India may be seriously weakened, even crippled: civil strife may remain always possible; possible even a new invasion and foreign conquest. The Partition of the Country Must Go."

Lal Khan, a Pakistani political activist and founder of the Marxist organization The Struggle, suggested that undoing the partition is a necessity because it would resolve the Kashmir conflict, as well as reduce the power of the "security-bureaucratic machine", thus guaranteeing a true secular, socialist and democratic society. Advocating for a common revolution, Khan declared that "Five thousand years of common history, culture and society is too strong to be cleavaged by this partition." His views are described his book "Crisis in the Indian Subcontinent, Partition: Can it be Undone?" in which Khan states that "revolutionary transformation of the economies and societies is an essential prerequisite for the reunification of the subcontinent."

Reunification cannot be imposed on any nationality, community, religion or ethnic group. It must be a voluntary socialist federation. The main dynamic will be the programme and perspective of the revolutionary party, leading the insurrection. The programme must be based on the principles of scientific socialism. The eradication of misery, poverty, disease, ignorance, exploitation, national oppression and the subjugation of women and minorities in society is only possible through the overthrow of capitalism. The annihilation of the existing decaying and repressive states will be linked to the creation of a greater proletarian state based on a workers' democracy. —Lal Khan

Educationalist P. A. Inamdar commented at the Rangoonwala College of Dental Science in July 2017 that the reunification of Pakistan and Bangladesh with India would "keep India prosperous and peaceful".

Lieutenant General Asad Durrani, the former director-general of both Pakistan's Inter-Services Intelligence and Military Intelligence, envisioned in 2018 a future Indo-Pakistani Confederation that would possess a common currency and laws. Durrani stated that such an Indo-Pakistan Confederation would soften the borders of India and Pakistan and eventually integrate the armed forces of both entities, paving the way for peaceful Indian reunification, in which Delhi would serve as the capital city of united India.

The Pakistani Mohajir political leader Altaf Hussain said in 2022 that "we cannot call it true independence until India's borders are restored to pre-partitions days, and the demography is restored to pre-British colonisation days".

The Mumbai President of the Nationalist Congress Party, Nawab Malik, said in 2020 that the NCP advocates that "India, Pakistan and Bangladesh should be merged". Malik compared this to German reunification: "If the Berlin wall can be demolished then why not India, Pakistan and Bangladesh come together?"

=== Polls ===
In 2018, a public debate at the Oxford Union Society on the issue resulted in the conclusion "This House Regrets the Partition of India", with a majority of 108 votes holding that the partition of India was harmful and a minority of 76 votes that were in favour of it.

In 2022, a survey published by the Centre for Voting Opinion & Trends in Election Research "found that 44 per cent of Indians would support reunification with Pakistan." Moreover, 57% of Indians above age 55 thought that the partition of India should have not occurred. The Indian states of western India (including Gujarat, Maharashtra, Rajasthan and Goa) were largely critical of the Partition and were "supportive of any efforts of reunification".

According to Gallup Pakistan (not affiliated with Gallup based in the United States), in 2016, when Gallup Pakistan asked Pakistanis the question: "If you were a mature adult in 1947 (capable of voting). Would you have voted in favour of or in opposition of Pakistan's creation", 92% said they would have voted in favour of it. As per another Gallup Pakistan poll, in 2021 73% held the opinion that the partition of India was a good step for relations between Muslims and Hindus.

=== Religious groups ===
Kingsley Martin observed that "Hindus ... have not forgiven the Muslim League for destroying the unity of the subcontinent when the British agreed to independence." Many Hindus were devastated by the fact that "part of the motherland envisaged in the ancient Hindu scriptures" was partitioned from India. The Bharatiya Jana Sangh, a Hindu political organisation held the creation of Akhand Bharat as one of its objectives; in this context, Akhand Bharat's borders were that of India, before its partition in 1947. Ram Madhav, a spokesman for the Rashtriya Swayamsevak Sangh, a Hindu nationalist organisation, stated that "The RSS still believes that one day these parts, which have for historical reasons separated only 60 years ago, will again, through popular goodwill, come together and Akhand Bharat will be created."

A group of 200 Islamic clerics gathered in Pune in July 2017 and issued a statement calling for Indian Reunification:

Until and unless the borders of India are peaceful we won't be able to achieve economical, societal and educational development. Tensions at borders are leading to enormous expenditures and development work is stalled. The division made by British was unnatural so we request honorable Prime Minister Narendra Modi to use all military options and unite Pakistan, Bangladesh and Afghanistan to make Akhand Bharat. The dream saw by Indian leaders before and after independence will come true and India will become the most powerful country in the world.

The musician Mehdi Hassan, when visiting Ajmer Sharif Dargah, always prayed for the "reunification of India and Pakistan in some peaceful form or the other."

The Islamist group Lashkar-e-Taiba has framed the prophecy of Ghazwa-e-Hind, as one in which India is defeated and united with Pakistan, unifying the Indian subcontinent under Muslim rule.

== See also ==
- India–Pakistan Confederation
- Madani–Iqbal debate
- Two-nation theory
