= Rezaul Karim (lawyer) =

Bengali lawyer

- রেজাউল করিম
- Born: 1902; Birbhum, Bengal Presidency, Colonial India
- Occupation: Lawyer

Rezaul Karim (born 1902) was a Bengali Muslim lawyer and member of the Indian National Congress. During the Indian independence movement, he was a champion of composite nationalism and a united India.

== Early life and education ==
Rezaul Karim was born in 1902 in Birbhum, Bengal Presidency, Colonial India.

Rezaul Karim received his education in the Calcutta Madrasa and in the University of Calcutta during the 1920s and 1930s. He "studied law and inherited a traditional Muslim education in Arabic and Persian", having "access to Bengali literary and cultural traditions in Calcutta".

Karim was acquainted with Kazi Nazrul Islam and Muzaffar Ahmad, with whom he had contact.

== Career ==
At the time of the Indian independence movement, Rezaul Karim championed Hindu-Muslim unity and thus opposed the partition of India. He wrote a text called Pakisthan Examined in which he stated that it is "strange to say that all those persons who have always supported British imperialism in India, have become now the advocates of the Pakistan movement. But those Muslims who always supported the freedom movement of the country are almost to a man stoutly against this movement." As a nationalist Indian Muslim, Karim said that “our position in India is just the same as it is with the Hindus of the land. We belong to India, and we are one nation with the people of the land.” He advocated for composite nationalism, with historian Neilesh Bose of the University of Victoria stating that “Rezaul Karim developed a Bengali Muslim composite nationalism that aimed to connect religion, region and nation in the context of a subjunctive, possible future India.” Rezaul Karim called for Indian Muslims to support a united India and firmly rejected the two-nation theory:

I take pride in India in all her past glories and honours. Robbed in splendour and dignity let our common mother regain once more her former freedom and majesty. Let India be our motherland in the truest sense of the term. All that grew on its broad bosom is our inheritance. Its Vedas, its Upanishads, its Rama, Sita, its Ramayana, and Mahabharat, its Krishna and Gita, its Asoka and Akbar, its Kalidas and Amir Khusru, its Aurangzeb and Dara, its Rana Pratap and Sitaram—all are our own inheritance. None of them is alien to us—Muslims, — or alien to our civilization and culture. Whatever is bad in it or whatever is good in it — all belongs to me. Hindus, Muslims, Christians, Parsis, Sikhs whatever community resides in India are brothers to me. With them I form one undivided nation and with them I fall and with them I rise. My fate has been linked up inseparably with the rest of India. Therefore we the Hindus and Moslims and other communities should stand before our Mother India in love and veneration and show respect to her. Our unhappy mother is in bondage and we should liberate her and make her free, happy and contented. Let us welcome the New India that is coming—the New India that is emerging out of the debris of one hundred and fifty years of foreign domination. Let us all salute our noble Mother India—not southern India and northern India, not Hindu India and Moslim India, but India as a whole, undivided India in its entirety—India the Universal mother of all civilization, and culture. Let us not partition our Motherland India, and cut to pieces the nerve-centre of her very existence. Let her remain one and undivided, and a single whole, so that we may call her children our own brothers, the bone of our bone and flesh of our flesh. And there lies our salvation.

== Works ==
- Naya Bharater Bhitti [Foundations for a New India] (1935)
- For India and Islam (1937)
- Pakisthan Examined with the Partition Schemes (1941)
