= All India Shia Political Conference =

Political party in British India

All India Shia Political Conference آل انڈیا تشیع پولیٹیکل کانفرنس
- Founded: 1929
- Headquarters: Lucknow, British India
- Ideology: Shia political representation, anti-partition

The All India Shia Political Conference (Urdu: آل انڈیا تشیع پولیٹیکل کانفرنس), commonly called the Shia Political Conference was a political party in British India that was organized in Lucknow in 1929.

In October 1937, it urged its members to support the Indian National Congress, a decision which was praised by Nehru.

The All India Shia Political Conference included provincial units, with notable individuals in leadership positions, such as Sir Sultan Ahmad of the Bihar unit, who denounced Jinnah in April 1940.

In the Shia Political Conference meeting held at Chapra on 18 April 1940, the pro-separatist Muslim League's Lahore Resolution was condemned; notable members in attendance included Yahya Nazim, Syed Hasan Askari, Mozaffar Husain, Ali Muzaffar, Abdul Aziz Ansari, as well as Shabbir Hasan, who presided over the meeting.

The All India Shia Political Conference was a member at the All India Azad Muslim Conference, which opposed the partition of India and creation of Pakistan.

== See also ==
- All India Shia Organisation
- Opposition to the partition of India
- Shia Islam in India
