= M. C. Davar =

Indian independence activist

M. C. Davar (24 April 1913 – 9 November 1977) was a freedom fighter and associate of Jawaharlal Nehru who is remembered for his opposition to the partition of India, his work among the refugees from Pakistan and his championing the idea of a confederation of India and Pakistan.

== Early life and education ==
Davar began his political career as a revolutionary during his school and college before joining the Indian National Congress. He was a successful doctor graduating from Calcutta, also attended the Vidysagar College and did his post graduation in TB from Calcutta. He however gave up his medical career on the advice of Subhash Chandra Bose following in the paths of Motilal Nehru and C. R. Das who had renounced lucrative legal careers for their participation in the freedom struggle. Davar however treated many prominent participants in the freedom struggle including Madan Mohan Malaviya, Rajendra Prasad and Fazlul Haque. He played a key role in getting the Central Assembly to recognise homoeopathy, a resolution that was later adopted by the Government of India.

== Role in the freedom struggle ==
Davar joined the Indian National Congress after witnessing its annual session at Lahore in 1929 where Jawaharlal Nehru succeeded his father Motilal to the presidency of the Congress. In April 1930 he was arrested for his participation in the Salt Satyagraha. Davar is remembered for his staunch opposition to the proposal for the Partition of India. To prevent this and to bridge the divide between the Congress and the Muslim League, he formed the United Party of India of which he served as secretary general and which had among its members the ex-Premier of Bengal A. K. Fazlal Haque, Sir Syed Sultan Ahmed and Mahatma Bhagwan Din. Despite his efforts, India was partitioned for which he blamed the British bureaucracy.

== Life in independent India ==
Davar headed the All-India Refugee Convention and was a member of the High Power Committee on Refugee Rehabilitation in which roles he worked for the rehabilitation of refugees from Pakistan in Haryana and Delhi where refugee colonies such as Rajendra Nagar and Lajpat Nagar were established. Davar was an advocate of peace between India and Pakistan, leading a goodwill mission to Pakistan in 1955 and advocating a no war pact between the two nations as president of the council of Indo-Pakistan affairs. His proposal for a confederation with Pakistan, made in 1956, was endorsed by Prime Minister Jawaharlal Nehru. Following the birth of Bangladesh in 1971, Davar expanded the proposal for the confederation to include that country as well. Although a supporter of close ties between India and China, he became a bitter critic of China after the Indo-China War of 1962 during which he made an appeal to every family to donate 'one man and one tola gold' to defeat the Chinese forces. Throughout his career Davar was a supporter of Jawaharlal Nehru, campaigning for him at Phulpur in the General elections of 1952, 1957 and 1962 and later campaigning for Vijayalakshmi Pandit in the by-election of 1964 necessitated by Nehru's demise. Following Nehru's death, Davar advocated the establishment of a Nehru Peace Foundation to promote disarmament and universal peace. He contested against Zakir Husain in the Presidential Election of 1967. Davar was president, Mandal Re-Organisation in the All India Congress Committee. In 1954 he opposed the linguistic reorganisation of India and in the '60s, sided against Morarji Desai in the succession contests following the deaths of Prime Ministers Nehru and Shastri.

== Death and commemoration ==
Davar died in 1977 at the age of 65. His death was condoled by several leaders including Prime Minister Indira Gandhi and I. K. Gujral. Dr. M. C. Davar: A Revolutionary Visionary is a forthcoming book on his life by Purushottam Goyal, a former Speaker of the Delhi Legislative Assembly. He was survived by four sons and a daughter.
