= Syed Mohammad Sharfuddin Quadri =

Indian independence activist and Padma Bhushan awardee

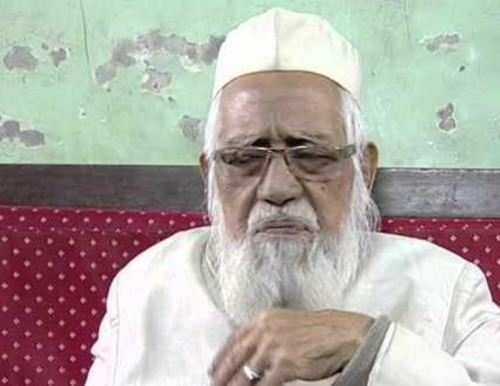
- Syed Mohammad Sharfuddin Quadri at his Ripon Street Residence
- Born: 25 December 1901 (Claimed); Kumhrawan, Nawada district, Bihar, India
- Died: 30 December 2015; Kolkata, West Bengal, India
- Resting place: Phulwari Shareef
- Occupations: Indian independence activist Gandhian; Physician
- Known for: Indian independence movement Unani medicine
- Parent: Mohammad Mohibbudin
- Awards: Padma Bhushan

Syed Mohammad Sharfuddin Quadri (died 30 December 2015) was an Indian independence activist, Gandhian and a physician of the Unani system of medicine. He accompanied Gandhiji in the Salt March of 1930 and was a prison mate of the Indian leader when they were incarcerated by the British regime at Cuttack jail. He was the founder of a medical magazine, Hikmat-e-Bangala and was among the group of people who founded the Calcutta Unani Medical College and Hospital. The Government of India awarded him the third highest civilian honour of the Padma Bhushan, in 2007, for his contributions to Indian medicine.

== Biography ==
Syed Mohammad Sharfuddin Quadri was to Mohammad Mohibbudin, a Unani practitioner, at Kumrava of Nawada district, in the Indian state of Bihar. Quadri claimed to have been born on 25 December 1901, however at the time of his birth, birth certificates were typically not issued. This makes his birthdate likely unknown as his claimed age would make him among the oldest men ever. His family later moved to Calcutta where he spent the rest of his life. Learning Unani medicine from his father, he assisted his father in his practice. During this time, he was also involved in the Indian freedom struggle and participated in the Salt March in 1930, along with Gandhiji and was jailed. He continued his association with the freedom activists and when Rajendra Prasad, who would later become the first president of India, fell ill due to respiratory problems, Quadri assisted his father in treating the future president.

Syed Mohammad Sharfuddin Quadri opposed the two-nation theory that advocated for the division of colonial India.

Quadri was the founder of Hikmat-e-Bangala, a medical magazine focused on Unani system of medicine, but the magazine eventually was closed doen due to paucity of funds. In 1994, he assisted Syed Faizan Ahmad in founding the Calcutta Unani Medical College and Hospital. He ran a dispensary at Haji Mohsin Square, Kolkata and treated patients free of cost. The Government of India awarded him the civilian honor of the Padma Bhushan in 2007. He died on 30 December 2015, at his Ripon Street residence in Kolkata, survived by his seven children.

== See also ==
- Salt March
