= Tufail Ahmad Manglori =

Maulvi Syed Tufail Ahmad Manglori

Founder of City High School at Aligarh Muslim University

Personal life
- Born: 1868 Manglaur
- Died: 30 March 1946

Religious life
- Religion: Islam

Maulvi Syed Tufail Ahmad Manglori was a colonial Indian educationalist and historian who was known for his establishment of City High School of the Aligarh Muslim University, founding of the journal Soodmand, and opposition to the partition of India.

His notable works include Musalmanon Ka Raushan Mustaqbil ("The Bright Future of Muslim"), which explicated the history of Muslims in India, as well as Rooh-e-Raushan Mustaqbil ("The Bright Spirit of the Future"), which argued against the Pakistan separatist movement.

Manglori was a proponent of the concept of composite nationalism. He opposed the idea of separate electorates based on one's religion.

== Early life and education ==
Syed Tufail Ahmad Manglori was born in Manglaur, North-Western Provinces, India in 1868. He gained his private education at a maktab there.

Syed Tufail Ahmad Manglori enrolled in Muhammadan Anglo-Oriental College in 1879. He engaged with the Duty Society of Sahibzada Aftab Ahmad Khan and the All India Muhammadan Educational Conference. As one of the founders of the Duty Society, Manglori sought to provide funds for poor students.

Syed Tufail Ahmad Manglori was elected as the Secretary of the University Union's Cabinet.

In 1889, he graduated with his F.A.

== Career ==
Molvi Tufail Ahmad Manglori founded schools for Muslim students in India in the cities of Muzaffarnagar and Shahjahanpur.

Manglori served as a member of the Provincial Legislative Council from 1926 to 1930.

== Notable works ==
- Musalmanon Ka Raushan Mustaqbil (1937)
- Rooh-e-Raushan Mustaqbil (1946)
