= All India Shia Organisation =

Islamic organization based in Hyderabad, India

All India Shia Organisation (A.I.S.O) is a Hyderabad, India-based organisation working for the welfare of the Shia community and for the protection of Shia wakf properties.

== Office bearers ==
- Mir Hadi Ali — Founder and chairman
- Mirza Mehdi Ali Baig — General secretary
- Syed Raza Hussain Zaidi — Secretary
- Syed Rizwan Hussain Zaidi 6— Secretary of operations

== See also ==
- All India Shia Political Conference
