= Syed Sultan Ahmed =

Indian barrister and politician (1880–1963)

Sir Syed Sultan Ahmed, KCSI (1880–1963, Patna, Bengal Presidency, British India) was an Indian barrister and politician who had a highly successful practice as a barrister, having victories over Motilal Nehru, Tej Bahadur Sapru and Sarat Chandra Bose. He was related to Sir Ali Imam and Syed Hasan Imam, who were also barristers from Bihar.

He was the first Indian vice-chancellor of Patna University (1923–30). As a delegate from British India, he attended the Round Table Conference (1930–31) in London, which was also attended by Mahatma Gandhi.

He was elected a member of the Bihar Legislative Council in 1937, but resigned on the grounds that he was too busy and could not find time for politics. He joined the Viceroy's Executive Council (1941–43) and was made the Member for Information and Broadcasting. Later he was also Advisor to the Chamber of Princes (1945–47) in India.

He supported M. C. Davar in his opposition to the partition of India, joining the United Party of India which aimed at bridging the gap between the Indian National Congress and the All India Muslim League.

Jinnah offered him a cabinet position in Pakistan, but he declined, saying that he could not leave India as it contained the graves of his forefathers. He had previously also refused the Nizam of Hyderabad's offer of being his prime minister as his father, Khairat Ahmed, who himself was a lawyer, reminded him of the bad experiences of his relative Sir Ali Imam in that role.

Sir Sultan edited the most popular book on Muslim Law "Mohammedan Law" for many years.

After Indian Independence, he focused on his law practice. In 1950 he became the president of the All India Shia Conference.

== Biographies ==
In 1963, three months after his death,a biography in Urdu was published with the title "Dr. Sir Syed Sultan Ahmad" in the June issue of the Lahore, Pakistan based Urdu monthly Nusrat written by Ataullah Palvi. This 50-page write-up is filled with historical references and contextual details. Both, Ataullah and Sir Sultan Ahmad hailed from the village of Pali, Bihar. Although Ataullah Palvi was a Sunni Muslim, he and his family were great admirers of Sir Sultan Ahmed.

In 2007, grandson, Syed Tanvirul Hasan wrote and published a comprehensive biogrpahy in Englsih entitled "Freedom and Partition and Seasons Changed :The Life and Times of Sir Sultan Ahmed".

== Honours ==
Syed Sultan Ahmed was created a Knight Bachelor in the 1927 Birthday Honours while serving as Vice-Chancellor of Patna University, and was elevated to Knight Commander of the Order of the Star of India (KCSI) in the 1945 New Year Honours.
