= Opposition to the partition of India =

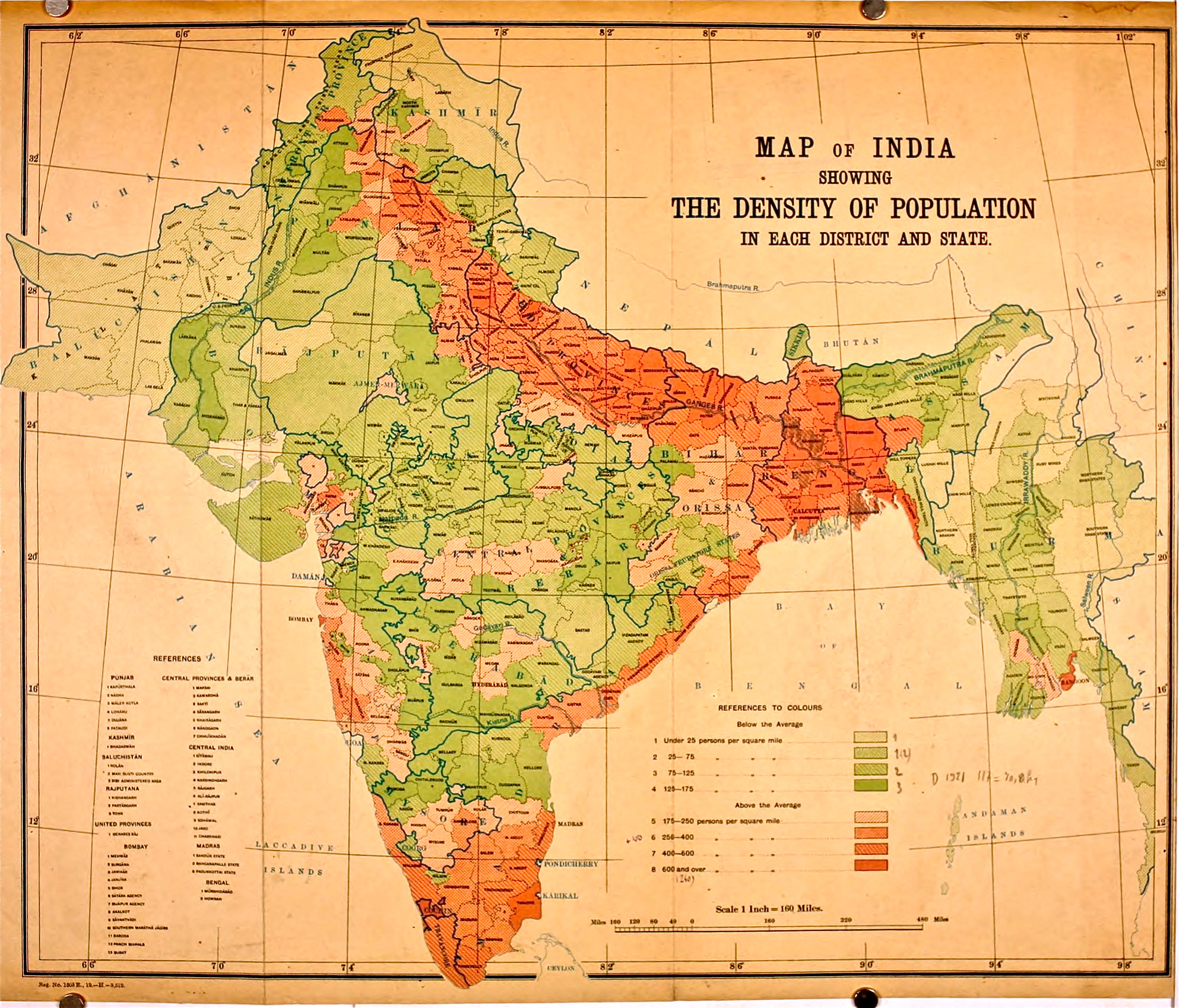
Map of colonial India (1911)

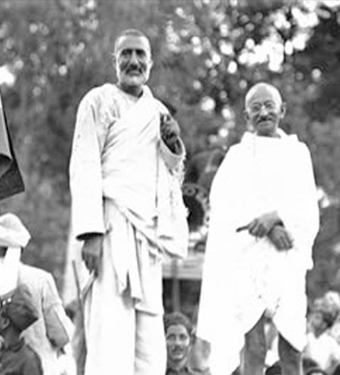
Khudai Khidmatgar leader Khan Abdul Ghaffar Khan and Mahatma Gandhi, both belonging to the Indian National Congress, strongly opposed the partition of India, citing the fact that both Muslims and Hindus lived together peacefully for centuries and shared a common history in the country.

Opposition to the partition of India was widespread in British India in the 20th century and it continues to remain a talking point in South Asian politics. Those who opposed it often adhered to the doctrine of composite nationalism in the Indian subcontinent. The Hindu, Christian, Anglo-Indian, Parsi and Sikh communities were largely opposed to the partition of India (and its underlying two-nation theory), as were many Muslims (these were represented by the All India Azad Muslim Conference).

Pashtun politician and Indian independence activist Khan Abdul Ghaffar Khan of the Khudai Khidmatgar viewed the proposal to partition India as un-Islamic and contradicting a common history in which Muslims considered India as their homeland for over a millennium. Mahatma Gandhi opined that "Hindus and Muslims were sons of the same soil of India; they were brothers who therefore must strive to keep India free and united."

The vast majority of Sunni Muslims of the Deobandi school, represented by the Jamiat Ulama-i-Hind, regarded the proposed partition and formation of a separate, majority Muslim nation state (i.e. the future Pakistan) as a "conspiracy of the colonial government to prevent the emergence of a strong united India". Many Deobandis therefore helped to organise the Azad Muslim Conference, to condemn the partition of India. They also argued that the economic development of Muslims would be hurt if India was partitioned, seeing the idea of partition as one that was designed to keep Muslims backward. They also expected "Muslim-majority provinces in united India to be more effective than the rulers of independent Pakistan in helping the Muslim minorities living in Hindu-majority areas." Deobandis pointed to the Treaty of Hudaybiyyah, which was made between the Muslims and Qureysh of Mecca, that "promoted mutual interaction between the two communities thus allowing more opportunities for Muslims to preach their religion to Qureysh through peaceful tabligh." Deobandi Sunni scholar Sayyid Husain Ahmad Madani argued for a united India in his book Muttahida Qaumiyat Aur Islam (Composite Nationalism and Islam), promulgating the idea that different religions do not constitute different nationalities and that the proposition for a partition of India was not justifiable, religiously.

Khaksar Movement leader Allama Mashriqi opposed the partition of India because he felt that if Muslims and Hindus had largely lived peacefully together in India for centuries, they could also do so in a free and united India. He reasoned that a division of India along religious lines would breed fundamentalism and extremism on both sides of the border. Mashriqi thought that "Muslim majority areas were already under Muslim rule, so if any Muslims wanted to move to these areas, they were free to do so without having to divide the country." To him, separatist leaders "were power hungry and misleading Muslims in order to bolster their own power by serving the British agenda." All of Hindustan, according to Mashriqi, belonged to Indian Muslims.

In 1941, a CID report states that thousands of Muslim weavers under the banner of Momin Conference and coming from Bihar and Eastern U.P. descended in Delhi demonstrating against the proposed two-nation theory. A gathering of more than fifty thousand people from an unorganized sector was not usual at that time, so its importance should be duly recognized. The non-ashraf Muslims constituting a majority of Indian Muslims were opposed to partition but sadly they were not heard. They were firm believers of Islam yet they were opposed to Pakistan.

In the 1946 Indian provincial elections, the Muslim League got the support mostly from Ashrafs, the upper class Muslims. Lower class Indian Muslims opposed the partition of India, believing that "a Muslim state would benefit only upper-class Muslims."

The All India Conference of Indian Christians, representing the Christians of colonial India, along with Sikh political parties such as the Chief Khalsa Diwan and Shiromani Akali Dal led by Master Tara Singh condemned the call by separatists to create Pakistan, viewing it as a movement that would possibly persecute them. Frank Anthony, a Christian leader who served as the president of the All India Anglo-Indian Association, cited several reasons for opposing the partition of India. If India were to be divided, the regions proposed to become Pakistan would still contain a “considerable number of non-Muslims, and a large number of Muslims would also remain in [independent] India" thus rendering the partition to be useless. Furthermore, the partition of India would jeopardise the interests of the minority communities. He held that the plan proposed by the All India Muslim League would cause the balkanisation of India that would lead to "potentially ‘emasculating’ India" as a global leader. Anthony stated that India was unlike Europe in that “India had achieved a basic ethnic and cultural unity.” Lastly, Anthony held that “the division of India would lead to war between the two countries” and give rise to the spread of extremist ideologies.

Critics of the partition of India argue that an undivided India would have boasted one of the strongest armies in the world, had more competitive sports teams, fostered an increased protection of minorities with religious harmony, championed greater women's rights, possessed extended maritime borders, projected elevated soft power, and offered a "focus on education and health instead of the defence sector".

Pakistan was created through the partition of India on the basis of religious segregation; the very concept of dividing the country of India has criticised for its implication "that people with different backgrounds" cannot live together. After it occurred, critics of the partition of India point to the displacement of fifteen million people, the murder of more than one million people, and the rape of 75,000 women to demonstrate the view that it was a mistake.

== Organisations and prominent individuals opposing the partition of India ==
=== Political parties ===
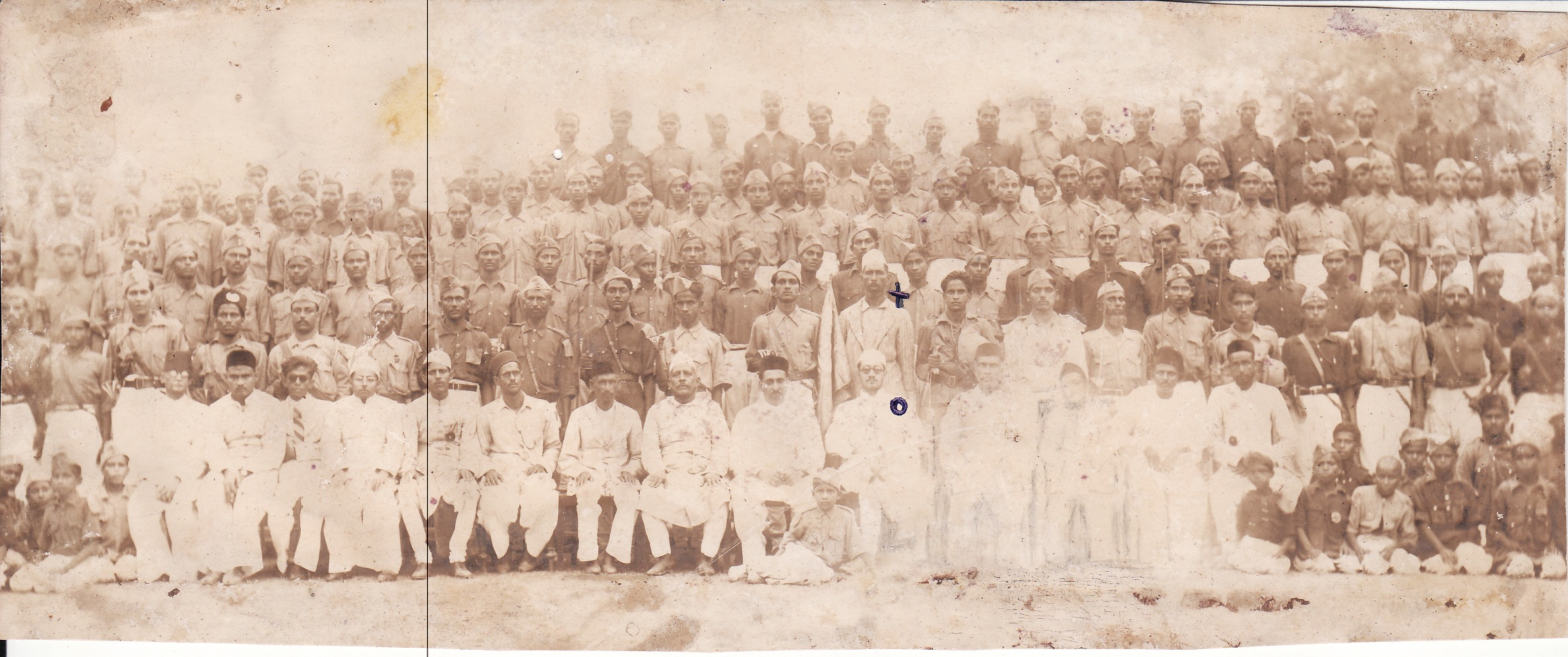
First Session of All-India Jamhur Muslim League, which was established by Maghfoor Ahmad Ajazi to support a united India (1940).

- All India Anglo-Indian Association led by its president Frank Anthony "vociferously opposed Partition."
- All India Azad Muslim Conference was an organisation headed by the Premier of Sind Allah Bakhsh Soomro, which represented the religiously observant Muslim working class; in one of the largest gatherings of Muslims in colonial India, it rallied in Delhi to oppose the partition of India.
- All India Conference of Indian Christians opposed the partition of India, as well as the creation of separate electorates based on religion; it supported swaraj and helped to secure to rights of minorities in the Constitution of India.
- All-India Jamhur Muslim League was erected "in 1940, to oppose Jinnah's scheme of Pakistan".
- All India Momin Conference saw itself as articulating the interests of common, rather than upper-class Muslims and passed a resolution against the partition of India in 1940. It said: “the Partition scheme was not only impracticable and unpatriotic but altogether un-Islamic and unnatural, because the geographical position of the different provinces of India and the intermingled population of the Hindus and Muslims are against the proposal and because the two communities have been living together for centuries, and they have many things in common between them.”
- All India Muslim Majlis opposed the partition of India "as impracticable".
- All India Shia Political Conference protested the idea of creating a Pakistan, being against the partition of colonial India. It also supported common electorates.
- Anjuman-i-Watan Baluchistan allied itself with the Indian National Congress and opposed the partition of India.
- Central Khalsa Young Men Union declared its "unequivocal opposition" to the creation of a separate Muslim state in northwestern India, as with other Sikh organisations.
- Chief Khalsa Diwan declared its "unequivocal opposition" to the creation of a separate Muslim state in northwestern India, as with other Sikh organisations.
- Communist Party of India opposed the partition of India and did not participate in the Independence Day celebrations of 15 August 1947 in protest of the division of the country.
- Indian National Congress firmly opposed the partition of India, though it later reluctantly accepted it after the failure of the Cabinet Mission Plan. According to Congress it was unavoidable from India's side.
- Jamiat Ahl-i-Hadis was a member party of the All India Azad Muslim Conference, which opposed the partition of India.
- Jamiat Ulema-e-Hind was "uncompromisingly against the formation of Pakistan", rejecting the idea of the partition and instead advocating for composite nationalism in a united India (cf. Muttahida Qaumiyat Aur Islam).
- Khaksar Movement opposed the partition of India and were "outspoken critics of the Pakistan scheme".
- Khudai Khidmatgar stood out against the partition of India, using nonviolent principles to resist British rule in the country.
- Krishak Praja Party condemned idea of a partition plan as "absurd and meaningless".
- Majlis-e-Ahrar-ul-Islam passed a resolution in 1943 declaring itself to be against the partition and "introduced a sectarian element into its objections by portraying Jinnah as an infidel in an attempt to discredit his reputation."
- Sind United Party held that "Whatever our faiths we must live together in our country in an atmosphere of perfect amity and our relations should be the relations of the several brothers of a joint family, various members of which are free to profess their faith as they like without any let or hindrance and of whom enjoy equal benefits of their joint property."
- Shiromani Akali Dal led by Master Tara Singh saw the idea of the creation of a Muslim state as inviting possible persecution of Sikhs, who thus "launched a virulent campaign against the Lahore Resolution".
- Unionist Party (Punjab), which had a base of Muslims, Hindus and Sikhs, opposed the partition of India from the perspective of seeing the Punjabi identity as more important than one's religious identity.

=== Politicians ===
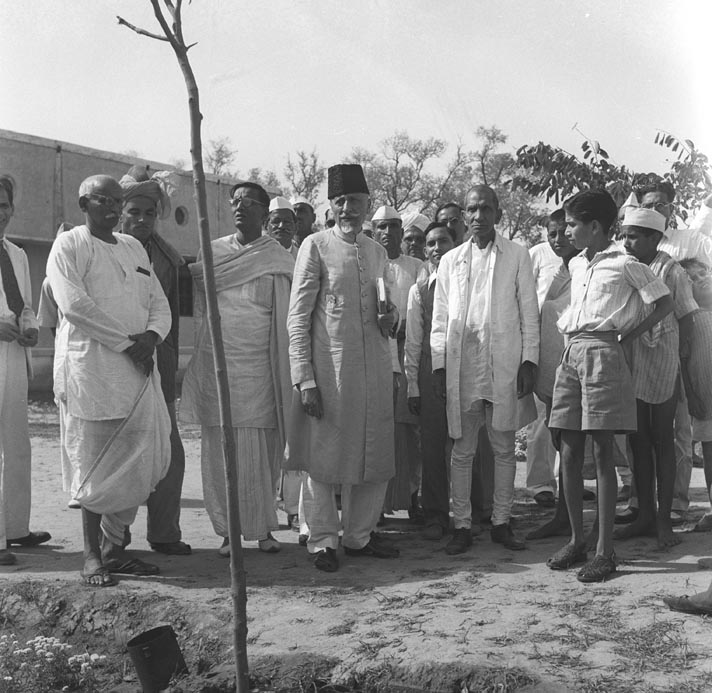
Maulana Abul Kalam Azad, a key player in the Indian independence movement, stated in India Wins Freedom that "as a Muslim, I for one am not prepared for a moment to give up my right to treat the whole of India as my domain and share in the shaping of its political and economic life. To me it seems a sure sign of cowardice to give up what is my patrimony and content myself with a mere fragment of it." He argued that if India were divided into two states, "there would remain three and half crores of Muslims scattered in small minorities all over the land. With 17 per cent in UP, 12 per cent in Bihar and 9 per cent in Madras, they will be weaker than they are today in the Hindu majority provinces. They have had their homelands in these regions for almost a thousand years and built up well known centres of Muslim culture and civilisation there."

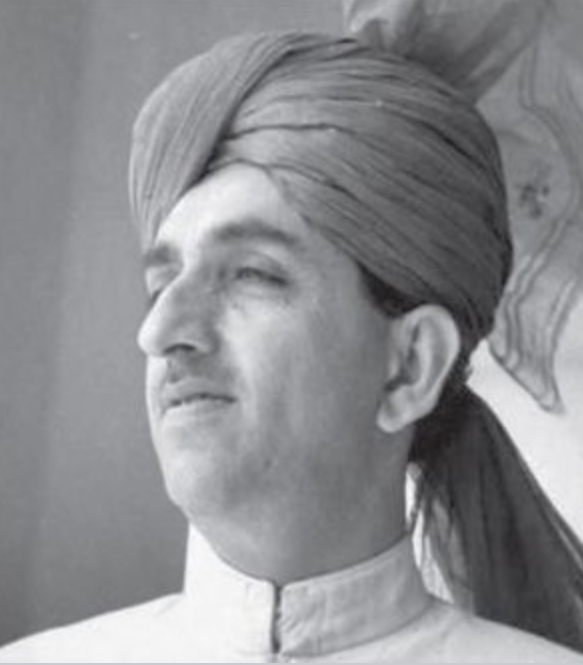
Malik Khizar Hayat Tiwana, the Premier of Punjab and leader of the Unionist Party, opposed the partition of India, referencing the pain that it would cause if the Punjab Province were divided. He felt that Muslims, Sikhs and Hindus of the Punjab all had a common culture and was against dividing India to create a religious segregation between the same people. Malik Khizar Hayat Tiwana, himself a Muslim, remarked to the separatist leader Muhammad Ali Jinnah: "There are Hindu and Sikh Tiwanas who are my relatives. I go to their weddings and other ceremonies. How can I possibly regard them as coming from another nation?" Tiwana advocated for amity between the religious communities of undivided India, proclaiming March 1st as Communal Harmony Day and aiding in the establishment of a Communal Harmony Committee in Lahore presided over by Raja Narendra Nath with its secretary being Maulvi Mahomed Ilyas of Bahawalpur.

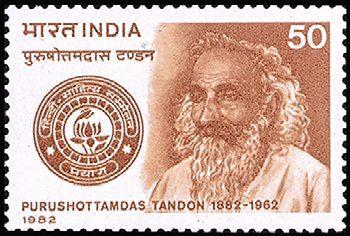
Purushottam Das Tandon opposed the partition of India, advocating unity, stating that "Acceptance of the resolution will be an abject surrender to the British and the Muslim League. The admission of the Working Committee was an admission of weakness and the result of a sense of despair. The Partition would not benefit either community – the Hindus in Pakistan and the Muslims in India would both live in fear."

- Abul Kalam Azad stated that the creation of a Pakistan would only benefit upper class Muslims who would come to monopolise the economy of the separate state; he warned that if it would be created, it would be controlled by international powers, "and with the passage of time this control will become tight".
- Abdul Matlib Mazumdar supported Hindu-Muslim unity and opposed the partition of India, being a prominent Muslim leader in eastern Hindustan.
- Abdul Qaiyum Ansari, a nationalist Indian and hereditary agriculturist, was a "staunch advocate of united and undivided India" and served as the president of All India Momin Conference to advocate for the same. On 8 October 1939, Abdul Qaiyum Ansari forwarded the Nukat-e-Momin (The Six Points of A. Q. Ansari) to the Indian National Congress for acceptance.
- Abdul Qayyum Khan, a barrister from the North-West Frontier Province of colonial India, declared that he would resist the partition of India with his own blood; he reversed his position in 1945 and joined the All India Muslim League
- Abdul Samad Khan Achakzai argued against the two-nation theory, favouring a united India.
- A. K. Fazlul Huq opposed two-nation theory after 1942 and made and attempts to mobilise non-Muslim League leaders against the partition.
- Allah Bakhsh Soomro, the Chief Minister of Sind, was vehemently opposed to partitioning India on the basis of religious lines; he chaired the All India Azad Muslim Conference to advocate for a united and independent India. Allah Bakhsh Soomro proclaimed that the very concept of "The Muslims as a separate nation in India on the basis of their religion, is un-Islamic."
- Allama Mashriqi opposed the partition.
- Ansar Harvani, a nationalist Muslim, voted against the resolution to partition India.
- Altaf Hussain, a Pakistani politician and founder of the Muttahida Qaumi Movement political party, called the partition of India the "greatest blunder" that resulted in "the division of blood, culture, brotherhood, relationships".
- Arshad Madani has criticised the partition of India, stating that it "has become a cause of destruction and ruin, not just for a particular community, but for both Hindus and Muslims."
- Fakhruddin Ali Ahmed supported Mahatma Gandhi's vision of a united India.
- Fazl-i-Hussain was opposed to the separatist campaign to create a Muslim state through the division of India.
- Frank Anthony, president of the All India Anglo-Indian Association, "vociferously opposed Partition". If India were to be divided, the regions that separatists wished to become Pakistan would contain a “considerable number of non-Muslims, and a large number of Muslims would also remain in [independent] India.” Furthermore, the partition of India would jeopardise the interests of the minority communities. He held that the plan proposed by the All India Muslim League would cause the balkanisation of India that would lead to “potentially ‘emasculating’ India” as a global leader. Anthony stated that India was unlike Europe in that “India had achieved a basic ethnic and cultural unity.” Lastly, Anthony held that “the division of India would lead to war between the two countries” and give rise to the spread of extremist ideologies. Anthony criticised the pro-separatist All India Muslim League led by Muhammad Ali Jinnah, holding them to be responsible for the murders that occurred during Direct Action Day and for spreading communal strife: “the hatred was really started by Jinnah, there's no doubt about it.” To this end, Frank Anthony charged the pro-separatist All India Muslim League with being "born in hatred" and being "responsible for an inevitable cycle of violence."
- Ghulam Hussain Hidayatullah, who was elected as the Chief Minister of Sind from 1937 to 1938 and also 1942–1947, rejected the idea to partition India.
- Hridya Nath Kunzru lauded the All India Indian Christian Association's commitment to interfaith solidarity against imperialism, as well as their opposition to the partition of India.
- Inayatullah Khan Mashriqi advocated a joint Hindu-Muslim revolution and called everyone to "all rise against" the "conspiracy" of a partition plan. Mashriqi saw the two-nation theory as a plot of the British to maintain control of the region more easily, if India was divided into two countries that were pitted against one another. Mashriqi, however, said that since the Muslims had ruled India for a long time, abandoning the land where many Muslims continued to live and allowing solely Hindus to rule a major part of the land, should be opposed. Nevertheless, once the partition plan had been formalised, Mashriqi felt that at least Delhi, the old seat of Muslim power, should be part of Pakistan, and opposed Punjab's partition plan.
- Jawaharlal Nehru opposed partition and believed it couldn't bring communal peace.
- Kanaiyalal Maneklal Munshi saw the idea of the partition of India as one that catered to the policies of divide and rule by the British government and he thus strongly opposed it, calling for an Akhand Hindustan (Hindi-Urdu for "united India").
- Khan Abdul Ghaffar Khan opposed the partition of India and campaigned against British rule in the country through nonviolence.
- Khan Abdul Jabbar Khan favoured a united India and was an ally of the Indian National Congress. He stood against communalism and battled the Muslim League after it became apparent that a Pakistan would be created out of the provinces of northwest colonial India.
- Khwaja Abdul Majid was a social reformer and lawyer "who supported Gandhi in his opposition to the partition of India."
- Khwaja Abdul Hamied, a pharmaceutical chemist, opposed the partition of India and suggested "an armed struggle against the Muslim League to keep India united". He felt that Muhammad Ali Jinnah's views were held only by a minority of Muslims in India. Khwaja Abdul Hamied was against the idea of separate electorates based on the religious faith of an individual, declaring that they were a manifestation of divisive communalism. He taught that "if people were told that those who vote for Pakistan had to go to that country then nobody would vote for the partition."
- Khwaja Atiqullah, the brother of the Nawab of Dhaka, "collected 25,000 signatures and submitted a memorandum opposing the partition".
- Lal Khan, a Pakistani politician and founder of The Struggle Pakistan, criticised the partition of India and advocated for Indian reunification, which he stated would heal continuing wounds and solve the Kashmir conflict. Advocating for a common revolution, Khan declared that "Five thousand years of common history, culture and society is too strong to be cleavaged by this partition."
- Maghfoor Ahmad Ajazi opposed the partition of India and founded the All-India Jamhur Muslim League to advocate for a united India.
- Mahatma Gandhi opposed the partition of India, seeing it as contradicting his vision of unity among Indians of all religions.
- Malik Khizar Hayat Tiwana, the Premier of Punjab, opposed the partition of India, seeing it as a ploy to divide the Punjab Province and Punjabi people. He felt that Muslims, Sikhs and Hindus of the Punjab all had a common culture and was against dividing India on the basis of religious segregation. Malik Khizar Hayat Tiwana, himself a Muslim, remarked to the separatist leader Muhammad Ali Jinnah: "There are Hindu and Sikh Tiwanas who are my relatives. I go to their weddings and other ceremonies. How can I possibly regard them as coming from another nation?" 1 March 1943 was proclaimed by Tiwana as Communal Harmony Day, with the Communal Harmony Committee being established by him in Lahore, with Raja Narendra Nath as its president and Maulvi Mahomed Ilyas as its secretary.
- Maulana Hifzur Rahman, a nationalist Muslim, voted against the resolution to partition India.
- Maulana Syed Ata Ullah Shah Bukhari was the creator of the Majlis-e-Ahrar-ul-Islam, which passed a resolution in 1943 declaring itself to be against the partition and "introduced a sectarian element into its objections by portraying Jinnah as an infidel in an attempt to discredit his reputation."
- Markandey Katju views the British as bearing responsibility for the partition of India; he regards Jinnah as a British agent who advocated for the creation of Pakistan in order "to satisfy his ambition to become the ‘Quaid-e-Azam’, regardless of the suffering his actions caused to both Hindus and Muslims." Katju claimed that after witnessing Hindus and Muslims joining hands in the First War of Indian Independence in 1857, the British government implemented a divide and rule policy to cause them to fight one another rather than rise up to fight against colonial rule. He also claims that the British government orchestrated the partition of India in order to prevent a united India from emerging as an industrial power that would rival the economy of any western state.
- Master Tara Singh declared that his party, the Shiromani Akali Dal would fight "tooth and nail" against the partition of India and creation of Pakistan.
- Maulana Mazhar Ali Azhar referred to Jinnah as Kafir-e-Azam ("The Great Kafir"). He, as with other Ahrar leaders, opposed the partition of India.
- Maulana Sayyid Husain Ahmad Madani strongly opposed the campaign for a separate Muslim state, instead advocating for composite nationalism in a united India (cf. Muttahida Qaumiyat aur Islam). Five decades earlier, Sayyid Jamal al-Din al-Afghani Asadabadi advocated for the same; he held that Hindu-Muslim unity in India as opposed to unity between Indian Muslims and foreign Muslims, would effectively combat British colonial rule, leading to an independent India.
- Maulana Abul Ala Maududi, the founder of Jamaat-e-Islami, actively worked to prevent the partition of India, arguing that concept violated the Islamic doctrine of the ummah. Maulana Maududi saw the partition as creating a temporal border that would divide Muslims from one another. He advocated for the whole of India to be reclaimed for Islam.
- M. C. Davar opposed the partition of India, creating the "United Party of India (UPI) with the aim of removing the chasm between the Congress and the Muslim League."
- Muhammad Tayyab Danapuri was a Barelvi scholar who wrote against Jinnah in his books.
- Hashmat Ali Khan, a Barelvi scholar and one of the successors of Ahmad Raza Khan, wrote a book against the two-nation theory.
- Mohammed Abdur Rahiman, a peace activist, "mobilised the Muslim masses against the two-nation theory of Muslim League."
- Mufti Mahmud, associated with the Darul Uloom Deoband, opposed the partition of India.
- Mukhtar Ahmed Ansari argued against Jinnah's two-nation theory.
- Nawabzada Nasrullah Khan, coming from the background with ties to the Indian National Congress and Majlis-e-Ahrar-ul-Islam, opposed the Muslim League.
- Purushottam Das Tandon opposed the partition of India, advocating unity, stating that "Acceptance of the resolution will be an abject surrender to the British and the Muslim League. The admission of the Working Committee was an admission of weakness and the result of a sense of despair. The Partition would not benefit either community – the Hindus in Pakistan and the Muslims in India would both live in fear."
- Rafi Ahmed Kidwai supported Mahatma Gandhi's vision of a united India.
- Ram Manohar Lohia opposed partition in line with Mahatma Gandhi's path of Hindu-Muslim unity.
- Rezaul Karim was a champion of Hindu-Muslim unity and a united India. He "argued that the idea that Hindus and Muslims are two distinct nations was ahistorical" and held that outside of the subcontinent, Indian Muslims faced discrimination. With respect to Indian civilisation, Rezaul Karim declared that "Its Vedas, its Upanishads, its Rama, Sita, its Ramayana, and Mahabharat, its Krishna and Gita, its Asoka and Akbar, its Kalidas and Amir Khusru, its Aurangzeb and Dara, its Rana Pratap and Sitaram—all are our own inheritance." In 1941, Rezaul Karim published a book Pakisthan Examined with the Partition Schemes that firmly rejected the two-nation theory and opposed the division of India.
- Saifuddin Kitchlew, a Kashmiri Muslim leader and President of the Punjab Provincial Congress Committee, was strongly opposed to the partition of India, calling it "a surrender of nationalism in favour of communalism". Kitchlew was an Indian nationalist who opposed British colonial rule and held "that a divided India would only debilitate the Muslim cause, in terms of its political emancipation and economic prosperity."
- Salman Khurshid criticised the partition of India, opining that a united India with a liberal democracy and proportional representation would have been better for the Muslims of the Indian subcontinent. Khurshid praised Nelson Mandela for refusing to accept a partition of South Africa.
- Shaukatullah Shah Ansari argued against Jinnah's two-nation theory.
- Sheikh Abdullah supported Mahatma Gandhi's vision of a united India.
- Shibli Nomani argued against Jinnah's two-nation theory.
- Sikandar Hayat Khan, the Prime Minister of Punjab, was opposed to the partition of India as he saw the consequence of dividing the Punjab as painful.
- Syed Sultan Ahmed backed M. C. Davar in his opposition to the partition of India.
- Syed Mohammad Sharfuddin Quadri, a leader who joined the Indian independence movement at the time of the Salt March, opposed the two-nation theory and was imprisoned in the same jail cell as Mahatma Gandhi
- Syed Habib-ul-Rahman of the Krishak Praja Party said that partitioning India was "absurd" and "chimerical". Criticising the partition of the province of Bengal and India as a whole, Syed Habib-ul-Rahman said that "the Indian, both Hindus and Muslims, live in a common motherland, use the offshoots of a common language and literature, and are proud of the noble heritage of a common Hindu and Muslim culture, developed through centuries of residence in a common land".
- Ted Grant, founder of the International Marxist Tendency, heavily criticised the partition of India, calling it "a crime carried out by British Imperialism" that was done in order "to divide the subcontinent to make it easier to control from outside once they had been forced to abandon a military presence."
- Tikka Raja Shatrujit Singh of Kapurthala stated his opposition to the partition of India and advocates for Indian reunification, citing the communal harmony that existed in the Kapurthala State of colonial India, which contained Sikhs, Muslims and Hindus who lived peacefully. According to him, a secular and united India would have been a global superpower.
- Ubaidullah Sindhi organised a conference in 1940 in Kumbakonam to stand against the separatist campaign to create Pakistan, stating "if such schemes were considered realistically, it would be apparent at once how damaging they would be not only for Indian Muslims but for the whole Islamic world."
- Zahid Ali Khan opposed the partition of India, believing that it would divide the Muslims of the Indian subcontinent.
- Zakir Hussain supported Mahatma Gandhi's vision of a united India.

=== Military officers ===
- Nathu Singh, an officer of the British Indian Army who opposed the partition of India, felt that the British decided to deliberately divide India in order to weaken it in hopes that Indians would ask the British to lengthen their rule in India. Singh said that the armed forces of undivided India were not affected by the "virus of communalism" and "were capable of holding the country together and thereby avoiding Partition." Singh was unable to forgive the politicians for failing to consult with the Indian Army before accepting the partition of India.
- Louis Mountbatten opposed partition. He later admitted that he would have "most probably" sabotaged the proposal to create Pakistan if he had been aware that Jinnah was dying of tuberculosis.

=== Historians and other academics ===
- Alain Daniélou, a French historian, saw the partition of India as a "great mistake" both "on the human level as well as on the political one". Daniélou stated that it "burdened India" and added to the region Pakistan, which he called an "unstable state". He said that as a result of the division of India, "India whose ancient borders stretched until Afghanistan, lost with the country of seven rivers (the Indus Valley), the historical centre of her civilisation."
- Maulvi Syed Tufail Ahmad Manglori, Indian educationalist and historian, opposed the partition of India and campaigned against the idea of separate electorates based on religion. He authored Rooh-e-Raushan Mustaqbil (روح روشن مستقبل), which argued against the Pakistan separatist movement.

=== Scientists ===
- Pakistani nuclear physicist Pervez Hoodbhoy criticised the partition of India, calling it an "unspeakable tragedy" that "separated people who at one time could live together in peace".

=== Writers ===
- Ashis Ray, president of the Indian Journalists' Association, criticised the partition of India at a debate organised by the Oxford Union in 2018, holding that Hindus and Muslims could have lived together peacefully in a united India.
- Hasrat Mohani, an Urdu poet who coined the Hindustani language phrase Inquilab Zindabad (translation: "Long live the revolution!") was against the two-nation theory and chose to remain in independent India after the partition occurred.
- Jaun Elia opposed the partition of India due to his Communist ideology, remembering his birth city Amroha with nostalgia after he moved to Karachi. Elia said that the formation of Pakistan was a prank played on the people by elites from Aligarh.
- M. Alexeyev, writing in the Bolshevik less than one year after the partition of India occurred, stated:

Because of the fear of the peasant revolution, the leaders of the Muslim League in full agreement with British imperialism favoured the partition of India and maintenance of British domination. They demanded formation of the Muslim State, by kindling religious animosity between the Hindus and the Muslims. ... The partition of India could not solve and did not solve a single problem including the Hindu-Muslim problem. On the contrary it intensified the religious differences, especially in connection with the partition of the province of the Punjab, and facilitated the incitement of bloody conflicts between the Hindus, Sikhs and Musulmans. Millions of refugees rushed from one dominion to another. Hindus and Sikhs fled to Hindustan and Muslims to Pakistan. Whole villages were depopulated, harvests were not gathered, fields were not sown. ... armed bands organised on fascist lines, flooded with agents of the British secret police, organised massacre of Musulmans in Hindustan, and of Hindus and Sikhs in Pakistan. Fratricidal clashes in Hindustan and Pakistan were handy to British imperialism and its agents. The partition of India was effected with a view to maintain political and economic domination of British imperialism in the country divided into parts. ... The partition of India was accomplished by the Labour Government which is more supple and more capable of making use of social and national demagogy, than the previous Conservative Government. It was easier for the Labour Party to accomplish this manoeuvre because the leaders of the Indian National Congress had always been maintaining with them a certain contract and more willingly came to a compromise with the Labour Cabinet. It is characteristic that the Conservative Party supported the plan of partitioning India, proposed by the Labour Government. This testifies to the fact that the whole of this plan is a British imperialist plan and corresponds with its interests and its calculations. It is not without reasons that during the debate on the Bill in the British House of Commons and the House of Lords, the leaders of the Conservative Party greeted the Government's plan as one which came to the rescue of the British imperialism, and the Labour Government as the loyal defender of the interests of the British Empire. Having divided India and conferred on Hindustan and Pakistan “the title of dominion”, British imperialism there by maintained its colonial domination over India. British capital fully and completely as in the past occupies a commanding position in the economy of Hindustan and Pakistan. A powerful lever of the colonial exploitation of India is the banking system. All the big banks in India, with the exception of two, are managed by British monopolists. Thus they are holding in their hands the largest amount of capital which they can invest in industries, Railways, Ports etc. Indian industry is fully dependent on the British bankers. More than half of jute and tea industry of Hindustan, 1/3rd of iron and steel industry, the whole mineral output, rubber plantations etc. belong to British capital.

- Saadat Hasan Manto strongly opposed the partition of India, which he saw as an "overwhelming tragedy" and "maddeningly senseless". The literature he is remembered for is largely about the partition of India.
- Shamim Karhani, an Urdu poet associated with the Progressive Writers' Movement, opposed the demand for Pakistan in his poem Pakistan chahne walon se (“To those who want Pakistan”), which argued against the Partition of India.
- Sri Aurobindo, a poet, saw the partition of India as a "monstrosity" and on 15 August 1947, stated that he hoped "the Nation will not accept the settled fact as for ever settled, or as anything more than a temporary expedient." He further said that "if it lasts, India may be seriously weakened, even crippled; civil strife may remain always possible, possible even a new invasion and foreign conquest. The partition of the country must go...For without it the destiny of India might be seriously impaired and frustrated. That must not be." Aurobindo saw the two-nation theory as "new-fanged", "contrary to the facts" and being "invented by Jinnah for his purposes"; Aurobindo wrote that "More than 90% of the Indian Muslims are descendants of converted Hindus and belong as much to the Indian nation as the Hindu themselves. Jinnah is himself a descendant of a Hindu named Jinnahbhai" (cf. Jinnah family.
- Tarek Fatah, a Pakistani Canadian author and journalist, has criticised the partition of India, calling the division of the country "tragic" and lamenting that his homeland of Punjab "was sliced in two by the departing British to create the new state of Pakistan." He states that the British government partitioned India so that they would be able to combat Soviet influence through the establishment of British military installations in what was then northwestern colonial India (now Pakistan).

=== Religious leaders and organisations ===
- All India Conference of Indian Christians opposed the partition of India, as well as the creation of separate electorates based on religion; it supported swaraj and helped to secure to rights of minorities in the Constitution of India.
- Darul Uloom Deoband continues to oppose the two-nation theory, instead advocating for composite nationalism and a united India.
- Jamaat-e-Islami actively worked to prevent the partition of India, with its leader Maulana Abul A'la Maududi arguing that concept violated the Islamic doctrine of the ummah. The Jamaat-e-Islami saw the partition as creating a temporal border that would divide Muslims from one another.
- Mohammad Sajjad "played a stellar role in ideologically countering the Muslim League and Muhammad Ali Jinnah’s demand for Pakistan, besides campaigning vigorously on the plank of composite nationalism."

== Indian Reunification proposals ==
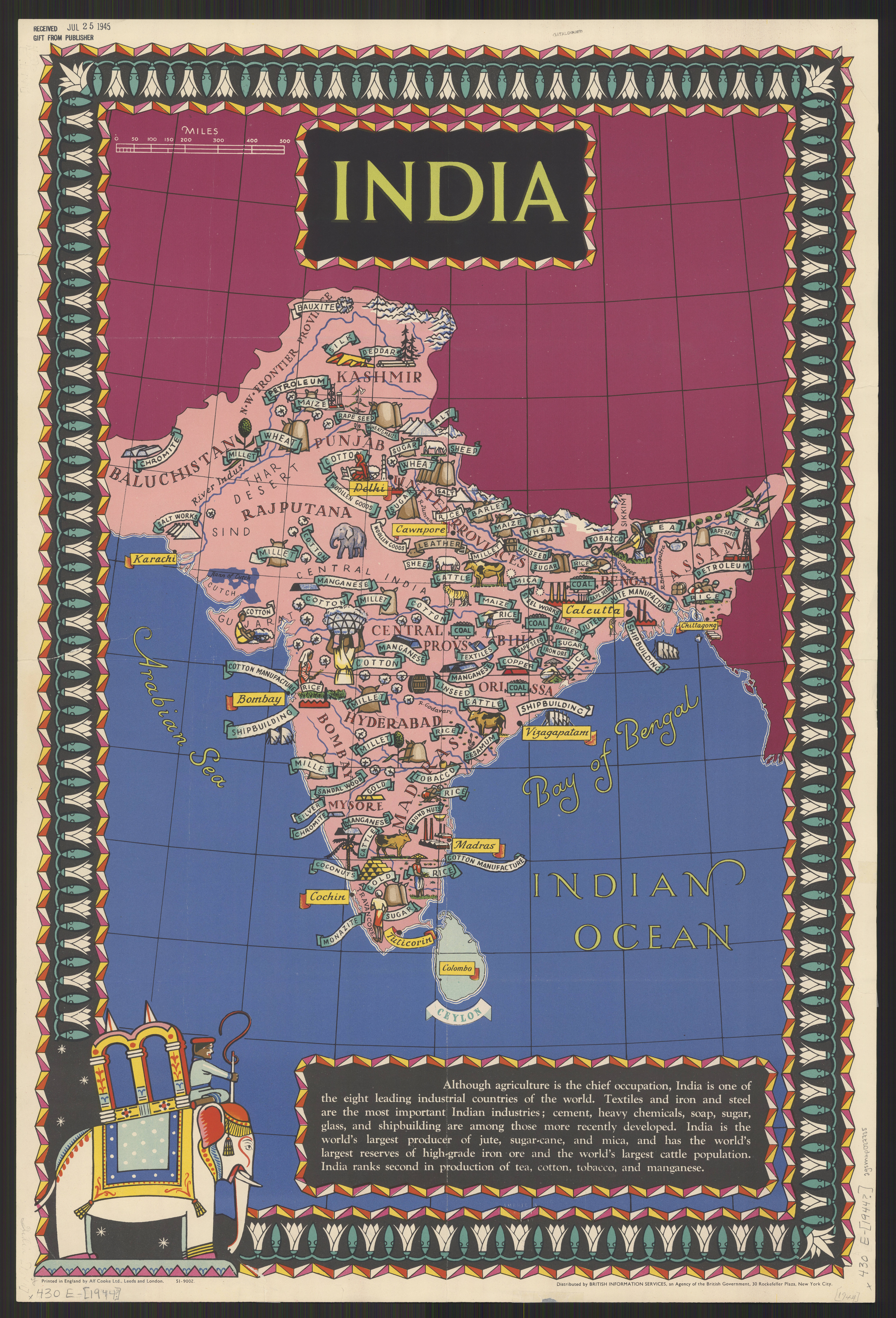
Map of India produced by the British Information Services (1944)

The subject of undoing the partition and reunifying India has been discussed by both Indians and Pakistanis. In The Nation, Kashmiri Indian politician Markandey Katju has advocated the reunification of India with Pakistan under a secular government. He stated that the cause of the partition was the divide and rule policy of Britain, which was implemented to spread communal hatred after Britain saw that Hindus and Muslims worked together to agitate against their colonial rule in India. Katju serves as the chairman of the Indian Reunification Association (IRA), which seeks to campaign for this cause.

Pakistani historian Nasim Yousaf, the grandson of Allama Mashriqi, has also championed Indian Reunification and presented the idea at the New York Conference on Asian Studies on 9 October 2009 at Cornell University; Yousaf stated that the partition of India itself was a result of the divide and rule policies of the British government that sought to create another buffer state between the Soviet Union and India to prevent the spread of Communism, as well the fact that a "division of the people and territory would prevent a united India from emerging as a world power and keep the two nations dependent on pivotal powers." Yousaf cited former Indian National Congress president Maulana Abul Kalam Azad, who wrote in the same vein:

If a united India had become free...there was little chance that Britain could retain her position in the economic and industrial life of India. The partition of India, in which the Muslim majority provinces formed a separate and independent state, would, on the other hand, give Britain a foothold in India. A state dominated by the Muslim League would offer a permanent sphere of influence to the British. This was also bound to influence the attitude of India. With a British base in Pakistan, India would have to pay far greater attention to British interests than she might otherwise do. ... The partition of India would materially alter the situation in favour of the British.

Yousaf holds that "Muhammad Ali Jinnah, the President of the All-India Muslim League and later founder of Pakistan, had been misleading the Muslim community in order to go down in history as the saviour of the Muslim cause and to become founder and first Governor General of Pakistan." Allama Mashriqi, a nationalist Muslim, thus saw Jinnah as "becoming a tool in British hands for his political career." Besides the pro-separatist Muslim League, Islamic leadership in British India rejected the notion of partitioning the country, exemplified by the fact that most Muslims in the heartland of the subcontinent remained where they were, rather than migrating to newly created state of Pakistan. India and Pakistan are currently allocating a significant amount of their budget into military spending—money that could be spent in economic and social development. Poverty, homelessness, illiteracy, terrorism and a lack of medical facilities, in Yousaf's eyes, would not be plaguing an undivided India as it would be more advantaged "economically, politically, and socially." Yousaf has stated that Indians and Pakistanis speak a common lingua franca, Hindustani, "wear the same dress, eat the same food, enjoy the same music and movies, and communicate in the same style and on a similar wavelength". He argues that uniting would be a challenge, though not impossible, citing the fall of the Berlin Wall and the consequent German Reunification as an example.

French journalist François Gautier and Pakistani politician Lal Khan have expressed the view that Indian reunification would solve the conflict in the region of Jammu & Kashmir. Arvind Sharma, Professor of Comparative Religion at McGill University, along with Harvey Cox (Professor of Divinity at Harvard University), Manzoor Ahmad (Professor at Concordia University) and Rajendra Singh (Professor of Linguistics at the Université de Montréal), has stated that the malaise and sectarian violence within South Asia is a consequence of the partition of India, which took place without a referendum in pre-1947 colonial India; these professors have stated that "Inhabitants of the subcontinent of India are poignantly reminded at this moment of the grave injustice that was done to them in 1947, when British India was partitioned without taking the wishes of its inhabitants into account." Sharma, Cox, Ahmad and Singh further wrote that "We regret that the fate of a quarter of the population of the globe was decided arbitrarily by the representative of an imperial power and by those who were not even duly elected by adult franchise." As such, Sharma, Cox, Ahmad and Singh in The New York Times in 1992 demanded that "a plebiscite be held over the entire territory that comprised British India on the question of its partition into India and Pakistan."

== See also ==
- Madani–Iqbal debate
- Composite nationalism
- Gandhism
- Hindu–Muslim unity
- Hindustan
- Indian independence movement
- Indian nationalism
- Malerkotla
- Partition Horrors Remembrance Day
- Violence against women during the partition of India
