= Manzooruddin Ahmed =

Pakistani political scientist and academic administrator (1929–2012)

- منظور الدین احمد
- Manzooruddin Ahmed
- Born: 26 May 1929; Sultanpur, United Provinces, British India
- Died: 27 December 2012 (aged 83); Syracuse, New York, United States
- Occupations: Political scientist, academic administrator
- Title: Vice-Chancellor of the University of Karachi

Academic background
- Education: University of Allahabad (BA, MA); Columbia University (PhD)
- Thesis: (1960)

Academic work
- Discipline: Political science
- Sub-discipline: Pakistan studies, Islamic political thought
- Institutions: University of Karachi; Columbia University
- Notable works: Pakistan: The Emerging Islamic State (1967); Contemporary Pakistan (ed., 1980); Islamic Political System in the Modern Age (1983)

Manzooruddin Ahmed (also spelled Ahmad; 26 May 1929 – 27 December 2012) was a Pakistani political scientist who served as Vice-Chancellor of Karachi University (1987–1990) and was the inaugural Quaid-e-Azam Distinguished Professor of Pakistan Studies at Columbia University (1976–1979). He is the author of several works on Pakistan and Islamic political systems and jurisprudence.

== Early life and education ==
Manzooruddin Ahmed was born in Sultanpur, Uttar Pradesh, India, on 26 May 1929. His father founded an all-girls school in Sultanpur and highly valued education; this led him to complete his BA and a master's in diplomacy and international affairs at Allahabad University by 1949. Later, he traveled to the United States as a Fulbright and Rockefeller scholar, completing his PhD in political science at Columbia University in 1960.

== Career ==
Ahmed joined the University of Karachi as a professor of political science in 1973. He returned to Columbia in 1976, serving as the Quaid-e-Azam Distinguished Professor and director of the Pakistan Centre and South Asian Institute. He was the inaugural Pakistan Chair holder at Columbia after the position was revived by Zulfikar Ali Bhutto following its suspension during the 1965 war.

Following his tenure at Columbia, Ahmed returned to Pakistan as chair of political science, eventually becoming dean of the Faculty of Arts, and in 1987 was appointed vice-chancellor of the University of Karachi, serving until 1990.

== Scholarship ==
Ahmed authored several academic texts and articles on Pakistan and Islamic political thought. Works include:

- Pakistan: The Emerging Islamic State. Karachi: Allies Book Corporation, 1967.
- Ahmed, Manzooruddin, ed. Contemporary Pakistan: Politics, Economy, and Society. Durham, N.C.: Carolina Academic Press, 1980.
- Islamic Political System in the Modern Age: Theory and Practice. Karachi: Saad Publications, 1983.
- "Iqbal's Theory of Muslim Community and Islamic Universalism". Iqbal Review, October 1982.
- Pakistan, Azadi Ka Natamam Safar (Urdu; unfinished journey to freedom). Karachi: Maktaba-e-Al Haq, 2008. Co-authored with Muhammad Younus Qadri.
- Pakistan: Independence and Beyond. 2012.

== Death ==
Manzooruddin Ahmed died on 27 December 2012 in Syracuse, New York, where he was living with his family. He is survived by three daughters and two sons.
