= All India Jamhur Muslim League =

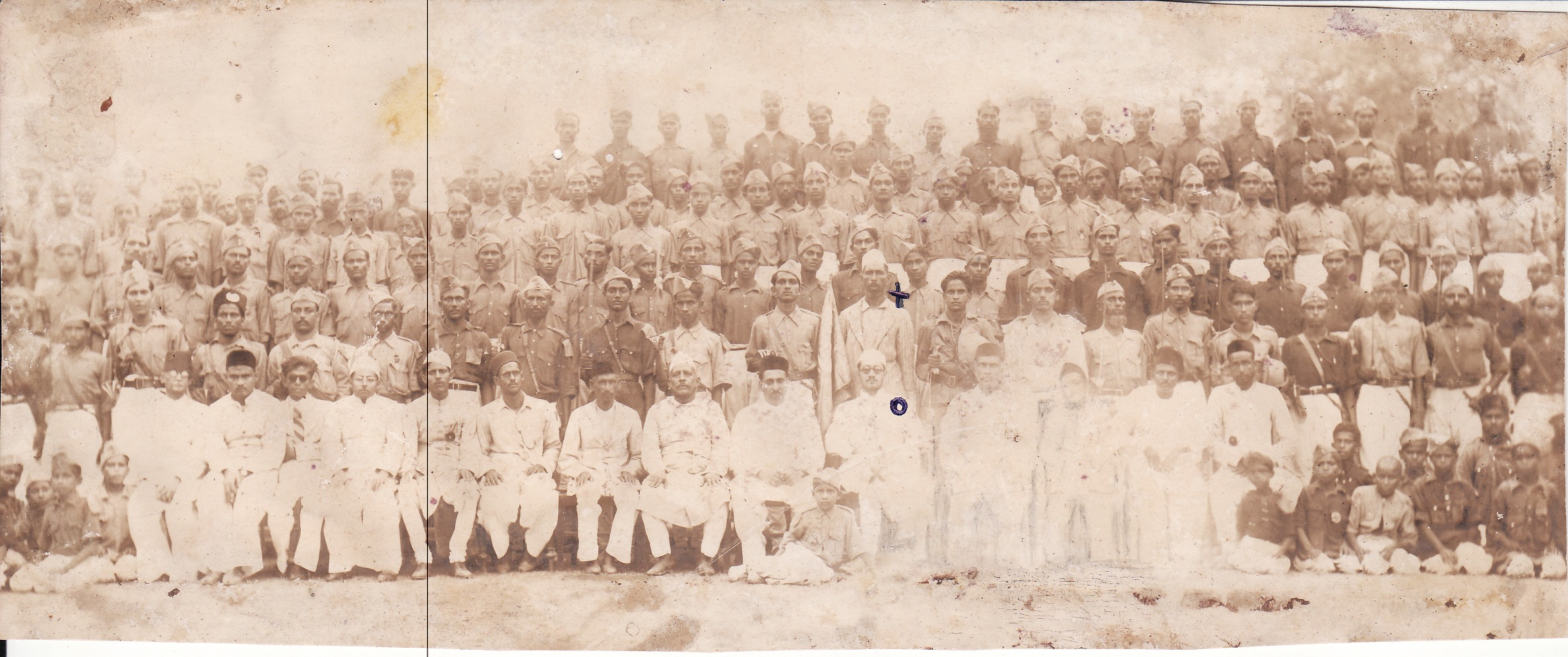
First Session of All India Jamhur Muslim League

The All India Jamhur Muslim League (Urdu: آل انڈیا جمہور مسلم لیگ) was formed in 1940, to counter the Lahore resolution passed by the All-India Muslim League, which advocated for a separate Pakistan. All-India Jamhur Muslim League, on the other hand, opposed the partition of India.

== History ==
The first session of the party was held at Muzaffarpur in Bihar. Raja of Mahmoodabad Mohammad Amir Ahmad Khan was elected president and Dr. Maghfoor Ahmad Ajazi was elected General Secretary. Later, the Raja of Mahmoodabad changed his mind under influence of Jinnah, who was a long time family friend, and rejoined Jinnah in 1941. A major faction of the Jamhur Muslim League under the leadership of Dr. Ajazi merged with Congress to strengthen its view of opposing the partition of India.

== See also ==
- All India Azad Muslim Conference
