= Madani–Iqbal debate =

Debate between Hussain Ahmad Madani and Muhammad Iqbal in the late 1930s

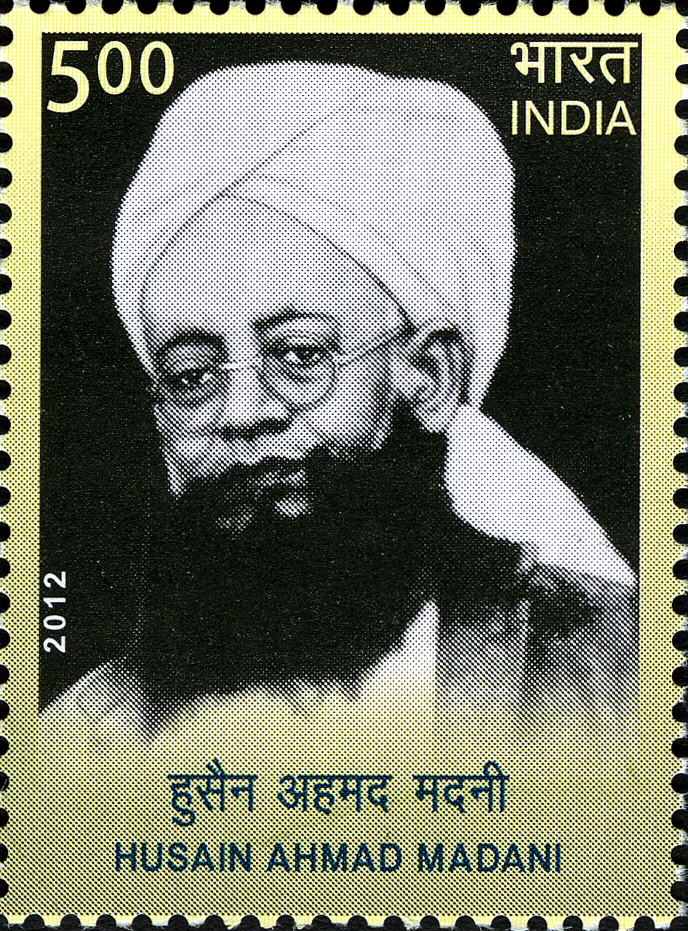
Hussain Ahmad Madani on postage stamp of India, 2012.

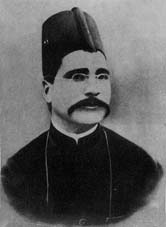
Allama Iqbal, 1899

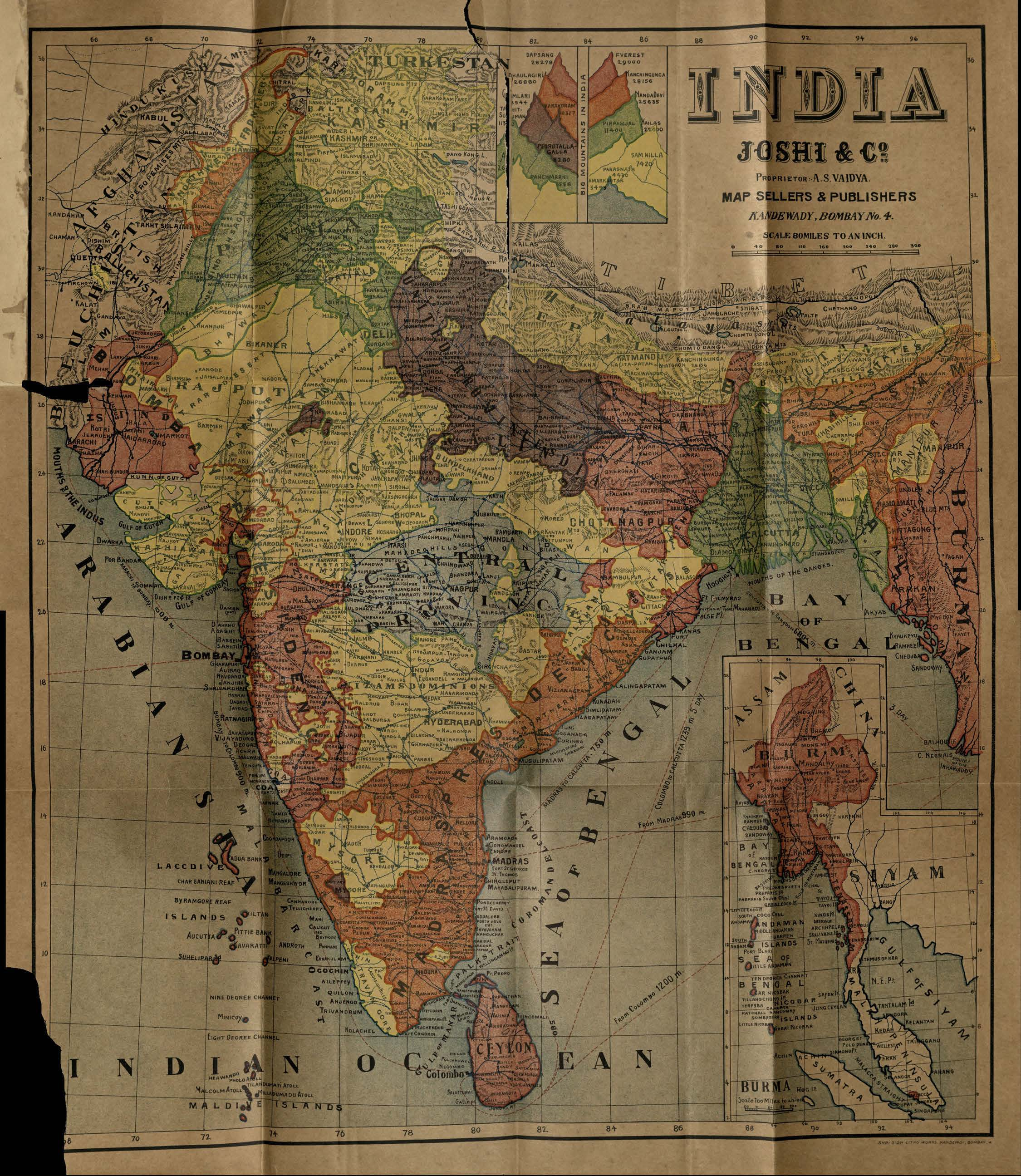
Map of India in 1930

The Madani–Iqbal debate was a debate between Islamic scholars of 20th century British India, Hussain Ahmad Madani and Muhammad Iqbal, on the question of nationalism in the late 1930s. Madani's position throughout the debate was to insist on the Islamic legitimacy of embracing a culturally plural, secular democracy as the best and the only realistic future for India's Muslims whereas Iqbal insisted on a religiously defined, homogeneous Muslim society. Madani and Iqbal both appreciated this point and they never advocated the creation of an absolute Islamic state. They differed only in their first step. According to Madani, the first step was the freedom of India for which composite nationalism was necessary. According to Iqbal, the first step was the creation of a community of Muslims in the Muslim-majority land.

== Concept of Nationalism ==
=== Muhammad Iqbal ===
Iqbal's concept of nationalism is part of his overall discourse on Western civilisation. According to Iqbal, popular Western political ideologies should not be accepted by Muslims, no matter how progressive and humanistic they appear, for these political ideologies are rooted in the fundamentally profane and secular spirit of the modern Western civilisation. The West has gone through a specific experience after the reformation. These ideologies are the product of specific time, place, and historical circumstances. The genesis and evolution of these ideas should be carefully studied by Muslims. Muslim civilisation, on the other hand, has its own unique ideals and visions. Muslims should therefore construct their own concepts in order to understand themselves and the nature of their mission in history. They cannot truly understand themselves through the categories developed by the West. Blindly accepting these categories will distort the self-image of Muslims and this will be the continuation of slavery and colonialism.

In order to develop his thesis on nationalism, Iqbal drew on various western thinkers, including Sir Arthur Keith and Lord Acton. Sir Arthur Keith centers the notion of nationalism on racial and tribal identities and therefore, the division of mankind into nation-states, according to him, was against the Zeitgeist. Lord Acton was a harsh critic of the nationalism ideologies and the institution of nation-states. He simply declared nationalism as the pursuit of insanity. According to him, the modern state is totalitarian and therefore, oppressive. Secondly, he regarded nationalism as incompatible with Catholicism and modern nation-states, as it is bound to subjugate religion.

Iqbal was fully aware of European history and the development of political modernity. There are two fundamental assumptions in political modernity. Firstly, political modernity assumes a political space that is independent of religious and private space. Secondly, ‘nation’ is defined as a basic political unit. John Stuart Mill, for example, observes that the presence of diverse and heterogeneous national groups can hinder the development of free institutions in a polity. According to Max Weber, this ‘political space’ is lacking in traditional Muslim societies and that explains why capitalism and modern political institutions failed to develop in the Muslim world. Iqbal was skeptical of the highly centralised and totalitarian nature of modern nation-states. Nationalism and modern nation-states thus can never be compatible with the spirit of Islam, which has a unique vision about the destiny of man, Iqbal claimed.

According to Iqbal, nationalism in Europe was the result of the reformation movement led by Martin Luther. The Catholic Church, despite being corrupt, was providing a common moral force to the entirety of Europe. Although not consciously intended, one of the consequences of the Lutheran movement was the loss of the common moral force which was transformed into a central religious authority. Multiple churches appeared in place of the Catholic Church under the broad Lutheran or Protestant umbrella, and this phenomenon provided Europe with the exact conditions for the rise of various rival nationalities. Enlightenment thinkers, like Rousseau and Voltaire, further diluted the moral force of religion by attacking the institution and the dogma of the Church. This was the historical and intellectual backdrop of the rise of nationalism in Europe. That is the reason Iqbal's concept of freedom from the British is not just limited to the end of British rule in India. He is more concerned about intellectual slavery in the form of the continuation of Western ideologies and political institutions. In his presidential address at the All India Muslim Conference in 1932, he categorically stated:

The present struggle in India is sometimes described as India’s revolt against the West. I do not think it is a revolt against the West; for the people of India are demanding the very institutions which the West stands for.

According to Iqbal, Islam as a moral force cannot be reduced to the private sphere of individuals only, as it is also the cornerstone of modern nationalism, which would eventually lead to atheism and thus the common thread amongst the citizens of modern nation-states will be their ‘irreligiousness.’ Iqbal also emphasised the works of Hegel (1770–1831), a famous German philosopher, who highlighted the spiritual character of nations. Thus, Iqbal thinks that only religion and faith can provide secure foundations for a social order. Nationalism weakens this foundation which is a loss for the social organism and humanity. He thinks that this is exactly the principal mission of Islam: to break the idols of race, color, and nationality.

Islam, according to Iqbal, presents a unique relationship between the individual and society. The formulation of the relationship between the individual and society is one of the main questions of any social order. Iqbal sought to explain this relationship in his two famous mystical poems The Secrets of the Self and The Secrets of Selflessness. In The Secrets of the Self, stages and conditions for the development of Khudi (higher Self) in an individual are discussed, while in The Secrets of Selflessness he emphasises the potential of this higher Self (Khudi), which could only be actualised when an individual becomes a member of society. Thus, it is through a human group, community, or society, that an individual nourishes or enlightens their soul. But this is possible only when social order itself is based on spiritual ideals.

Iqbal considers Ummah as a spiritual community that helps with the transformation and development of this Self. It is known that there was a paradigm shift in Iqbal's discourse on nationalism. According to Shahid Rasheed and Humaira Ahmad:

Before 1908, we can trace the elements of composite Indian nationalism in the poetry of Iqbal. His poems like Hindustani Bachon Ka Qaumi Geet [The National Anthem for the Indian Children] and Naya Shawala [A New Altar] indicate contradictory early views of Iqbal on nationalism.

But later, Iqbal revisited his views after a thorough study and in-depth analysis of the philosophical outlook and the historical movements which paved the way for nationalism in Europe. Iqbal declared nationalism as an enemy of Islam in the later stages of his life. He, through his poetry and prose, said that humanity cannot unite by first dividing it into rival nations and then creating a league of nations. That is why he was critical of the League of Nations. In his poem "Makkah and Geneva" he says:

In the present age in which the company of nations is common,

Hidden from sight is the unity of Adam;

Differentiation is the aim of Western governance, The purpose of Islam is only the community of Adam;

Mecca has sent this message to the men of Geneva, The association of nations or the association of Adam?

Iqbal also placed nationhood in the Islamic paradigm rather than in territory, language, or culture. He clearly observes: "It is not the unity of language, or country, or identity, or economic interest, that constitutes the basic principle of our nationality. It is because we believe in a certain view of the universe and participate in the same historical tradition that we are members of the society founded by the Prophet of Islam."

Iqbal differentiates between patriotism and nationalism. While patriotism can be a natural sentiment towards one's motherland, nationalism is a modern political ideology emerging from an atheistic and imperialistic worldview. In his address at the annual session of the All India Muslim Conference in 1932, Iqbal clearly stated:

Politics have their roots in the spiritual life of man… Patriotism is a perfectly natural virtue and has a place in the moral life of man.

He declared "Wataniyat" as an idol carved by Western imperialism and wanted to replace this Wataniyat with the love of Watan in a Prophetic tradition. In the Prophetic parlance, watan is completely different from the political meaning of the word watan.

Iqbal's discourse on nationalism is distinct not only from modernists but also from many traditional ulama, who were active in the political struggle against the British rule. Modernists, like Chiragh Ali (1844–1895) and Syed Ameer Ali (1849–1928), were ready to fully embrace the Western political paradigm. These scholars struggled to prove that the spirit of Islam was fully compatible with the political ideals and structures of the modern West.

Deobandi ulama's discourse on nationalism, however, is rooted fundamentally in their political struggle against colonial rule. They were more pragmatic in their approach to the political realities of Muslim India. Hussain Ahmad Madani, arguably, is the most important figure out of these ulama. Different public debates or discourses between Muhammad Iqbal and Maulana Madani over the meaning and interpretation of nationalism have been explored by scholars and researchers.

Some serious difficulties have arisen in understanding Iqbal due to the ‘nationalisation’ of Iqbal as a philosopher and poet. State narratives have oversimplified the complexity and profundity of Iqbal's political vision. This is also true in the case of literary criticism of Iqbal's works. Pakistani historian K. K. Aziz has struggled to explain that Iqbal's famous Allahabad Address does not mean the creation of a separate homeland for Indian Muslims. Here Iqbal is not against Hindu-Muslim unity or alliance for a greater cause, but he emphasises that such unity or alliance should not be understood as a composite Indian nation. Muslims can and should cooperate with Hindus but this cooperation is like the alliance of Muslims with the Jews of Madina through Mithaq-e-Madina. Muslims are not a language or race. Iqbal's concept of nationalism is fundamentally non-territorial. Iqbal does not seek a territory for a Muslim nation. He wants to awaken the consciousness of Muslims, that they should know their historic role in the unfolding of human history. His theory is a critique of the idea of nation-states. Humanity divided amongst rival nations is a disaster for mankind.

The force, according to Iqbal, that can unite mankind is Tawheed, as the unity of God leads to the unity of mankind. Iqbal's theory, in fact, is too grand and universal to be reduced to just a call for a separate homeland of Pakistan. Iqbal himself seems aware of this misinterpretation of his ideas. In a letter to Edward John Thompson in 1934, Iqbal writes:

You call me a protagonist of the scheme called "Pakistan." Now Pakistan is not my scheme. The one that I suggested in my address is the creation of a Muslim province, a province having an overwhelming population of Muslims in the North West of India. This new province will be, according to my scheme, a part of the proposed Indian Federation. The Pakistan scheme proposes a separate federation of Muslim provinces directly related to England as a separate dominion.

However, many scholars, including S. Q. Fatimi, Prof. Manzooruddin Ahmad, and Ahmad Hasan Dani argue that Iqbal moved from Islamic universalism to Pakistani nationalism.

=== Hussain Ahmad Madani ===
Hussain Ahmad Madani was a pupil of Mahmud Hasan Deobandi, under whose influence he joined the political struggle against the British. Mahmud Hasan was the first student of Darul Uloom Deoband. According to him, the real purpose of Deoband was not just academic in nature, rather it was political. The British had not only captured India from Muslim rulers, they had also colonised and fragmented other parts of the Muslim world, including North Africa and the Ottoman Empire. War against the British is therefore the most important Jihad of the time according to Deobandi Ulama. This anti-British attitude of the ulama can be traced back to the famous fatwa of Shah Abdul Aziz Dehlavi (1746–1824), the eldest son of Shah Waliullah Dehlawi (1703–1762). Shah Abdul Aziz declared India as Dar al-Harb (abode of war) in 1803. Tehreek-e-Mujahideen of Syed Ahmad Barelvi (1786–1831) and Shah Ismail Dehlvi (1779–1831) was also primarily against the British influence. Later, ulama also participated in the Indian Rebellion of 1857 at the fronts of Shamli and Thana Bhawan. Imdadullah Muhajir Makki (1814–1896) migrated to Makkah after the failure of this war. These ulama with anti-British orientation, gravely concerned about the future of Muslims, later founded Darul Uloom Deoband in 1867. Thus, the anti-British element was always an important element of the Deobandi worldview. The purpose was to sow the seeds of the struggle for freedom in the Muslim youth, along with their education and character building on traditional Islamic lines. Thus, Mahmud Hasan Deobandi made a comprehensive plan to oust the colonial masters. There were two dimensions of this plan. Firstly, there had to be a revolt against the British from within and secondly, Afghanistan and Turkey would have to attack from the outside. This plan was later labeled as Tehrik-e-Reshmi Rumāl (Silk Letter Movement). The plan couldn't succeed due to several factors and Mahmood-ul-Hasan and Madani were arrested and imprisoned in Malta in 1916. In Malta, they got an opportunity to interact and discuss ideas with freedom fighters and revolutionaries from other areas. Internment provided them a good opportunity to study, talk and think. After their release in 1920, these leaders founded their political struggle on the principles of non-violence and participation in mainstream nationalist politics. Mahmud Hasan supported Gandhi's Non-cooperation movement. After the death of Mahmud Hasan in November 1920, Madani became his successor. Madani remained president of Jamiat Ulama-e-Hind from 1920 until his death in 1957. Barbara Metcalf describes Hussain Ahmad Madani as an "argumentative Indian," a term she borrows from Amartya Sen. Metcalf exposes the artificiality and superficiality of the categories of Mullah and Modern. Mullah is assumed to be the opposite of Modern. Mullah is imagined as irrational, conservative, and intolerant, while modern is labeled as rational, progressive, and tolerant. She said: "His religious and political thought demonstrates the profound strand of what might be called contextually based reasoning that can be seen as typical of the traditionalist ulama in contrast to the blind conservatism often attributed to them." According to Yohanan Friedmann and Aijaz Ahmad, it is a great paradox of Muslim India that traditional religious ulama supported composite Indian nationalism, while modernists trained in Aligarh, Cambridge, and Lincoln's Inn supported Muslim separatism. According to Madani, homeland is generally accepted as the basis of national identity, and all the religious communities living in a particular area are regarded as a Qaūm or nation. As far as India is concerned, all of its difficulties, according to Madani, primarily arise from its political slavery. Therefore, resistance against this political slavery is the real task faced by all Indians, whether Muslims or Hindus. Both the communities are part of the composite Indian nation. It is only through composite Indian nationalism that the British can be defeated. According to Madani, Mithāq-e-Madina (Convent of Madina) provides the foundation for alliance and cooperation with non-Muslims in the struggle against British imperialism. While in prison, Madani wrote his biography Naqsh-e-Hayat. More than his personal account, the book explains how India has suffered under British rule. Truly patriotic, Madani also composed a booklet Hamara Hindustan Aur Us Kay Faza’il (Our India and Her Qualities), describing the significance and virtues of India and stating that Muslims have a legitimate claim on Indian soil and they are the original inhabitants of the land, thus refuting the extremist Hindus of Hindutva, who declared Muslims as foreigners. Thus, the struggle against British imperialism was, in Madani's view, a sacred struggle or a Jihad, hence they must co-operate with non-Muslims in this struggle. He also believed that any separatism in this regard would only benefit the British rulers. This was also the reason for his skepticism towards the political struggles of the All-India Muslim League. Along with politics of anti-colonialism, Madani was also aware of the particular problems of the Muslims of India and he used to travel to distant poor regions of Muslim Bengal for the social and spiritual uplift of Muslims. According to Barbara Metcalf, "He taught not only religious practice, narrowly defined, but also discipline and organisation for protection, dispute resolution, and participation in political processions and protests."

== Debate ==
On 8 January 1938, in a political meeting in Delhi, Madani gave stated that nations are defined by territory. On the next day, Urdu newspapers declared that Madani related the concept of Millat with land.

Iqbal, while not in good physical health, was shocked and, instead of discussing the point with Madani, composed vitriolic poetry in Persian. Perhaps he never felt the need to consult Madani, as he was always opposed to the politics of "nationalist ulama", which was also visible in his informal conversation recorded by Syed Nazeer Niazi during his last years. It means that Iqbal was clearly and profoundly in disagreement with Madani and it was not just an incidental episode that created the disagreement. The incident gave a spark to the already established views of both Madani and Iqbal. It is also misleading to view this disagreement between Iqbal and Madani in the light of opposition between the demand for a separate homeland for Muslims and an undivided India. Iqbal's idealistic theory does not accept ‘territory’ or ‘land’ as an element in the formation of a nation. If he accepts ‘separate land’ for Muslims, then his theory becomes self-contradictory. That is why ‘Pakistani nationalism’ would be as dangerous for mankind, according to Iqbal, as Indian nationalism or any other nationalism. In his theory, he is against all territorial nationalism and seeks to anchor nationalism in the higher principles of Islam. These higher principles, according to Iqbal, are Tauheed and Risalat. A point is that Iqbal did not formulate his theory of nationalism based on hatred toward Hindus. His concept of a ‘Muslim Nation’ is positive, in the sense that it is based on the higher moral and spiritual principles, and not on the inter-communal prejudices and hatred prevalent during his times. Iqbal was seeing a world of global brotherhood based on these higher principles. That is why he was against ‘territory’ as a basis for a nation, and he challenged the ideas of Madani. He had chosen the Indian Muslim community only as a starting point for his new world. When a European critic criticised Iqbal on the gap between the universalism of his vision of humanity and the particular application of this only to the Muslim community of India, Iqbal replied:

The humanitarian ideal is always universal in poetry and philosophy but if you work it out in actual life you must start with a society exclusive in the sense of having a creed and well-defined outline, but ever enlarging its limits by example and persuasion. Such a society in my belief is Islam…All men and not Muslims alone are meant for the Kingdom of God on earth, provided they say goodbye to their idols of race and nationality and treat one another as personalities…

Although as a universalist, Iqbal's practical focus was on the Muslim community of India and not on the brotherhood of Islam, three months before his death, during his interview with All India Radio, he stated:

Only one unity is dependable, and that unity is the brotherhood of man, which is above race, nationality, color or language...so long as men do not demonstrate by their actions that they believe that the whole world is the family of God...the beautiful ideals of liberty, equality, and fraternity will never materialize.

Annemarie Schimmel called Iqbal's discourse "supra-nationalism of Islam". The last article written by Iqbal was also a defense of this supra-nationalism of Islam against Madani's views on nationalism.

Iqbal's vitriolic verses against Madani created a controversy. Madani composed his ideas and presented them in Composite Nationalism and Islam. Madani, in his work, differentiated between ‘millet’ and ‘qaum.’ While ‘millet’ is based on religion, ‘qaum’ is based on language, culture, and territory. According to Madani, there is no contradiction between these two identities. In his work, he makes a semantic analysis of the terms ‘millet,’ ‘qaum,’ and ‘ummah’, citing Arab lexicographers of different periods, and also analyses the Quranic usage of these words. Madani's tone in this treatise is sober, serious, and rational.

This controversy between the two scholars is also an evidence of Madani's selflessness and anti-colonialism. He ignored all of the emotional accusations against him and clearly and forcefully explained his point of view. Rasheed Talut, a traditional Muslim scholar from Multan and an admirer of both Iqbal and Madani, wrote to Iqbal and Madani, and quite successfully tried to resolve the controversy. Through this correspondence, it became clear that Madani only described the norm of his times, when nations were defined as watan and not by race or religion. Some brief excerpts from this correspondence clarify Madani's position:

Inhabitants of England, despite being Catholics, Protestants, and Jews, are considered as one nation. Same is true of America and France.

I have never said that ‘millet’ is based on ‘watan’. It is strange that Iqbal is declaring that qaum and millet are same.

I have been outside India for seventeen years. They consider all of us as ‘Indians’. Only composite nationalism can unite different elements and religious communities of India in its struggle against British imperialism. This composite nationalism has always been a thorn in the heart of the British government.

On 20 February 1938, Iqbal wrote to Rasheed Talūt: "Maulvi Sahib has said that these days, nations are defined by Autaān (homelands). If by saying this he is expressing a fact prevalent in these times, then no one can have any objection because this ideology of Western politics is popular in Asia. However, if his purpose is that Indian Muslims should accept this ideology, then there is room for discussion because before adopting any ideology, one should confirm whether it is according to Islam or against it."

Madani replies to Rasheed Talūt:

When I was saying that these days, nations are based on Autān, I was referring to the norm and mentality of the times. It is news, not advice. I was saying that all of the inhabitants of India are seen as Indians in the outside world. Whether Hindus, Muslims, Sikhs, Parsees, or Jews, they all are treated alike. They all are considered slaves… I have only advised that we all should work for the freedom of India… and I consider this struggle as obligatory, and one must participate in this struggle according to one’s capacity. As far as the unity of Muslim countries regardless of race, color, and territory is concerned, this is in our nature. I was imprisoned in Malta because of this. Astonishingly qaum and millet have been declared as one.

After this, Iqbal took back his objection to Madani and gave a statement which was published in Daily Ehsan on 28 March 1938: "I have not advised Muslims to accept the territorial nationalism." (Maūlana Madani) "After this clarification, I have no right to raise an objection to him (Maūlana Madani)."

Iqbal, in this last statement, said: "In deference to Maūlana Madani, I am not behind his devoted followers." And through this statement, Iqbal terminated the debate with Maūlana Madani. Iqbal died after a few days. His unpublished poetry was compiled and published as Gift from Hijaz posthumously. The compilers, being part of the bitter political divide of the late 1930s, included that vitriolic verse against Madani in Gift from Hijaz without any clarification in the light of the last statement of Iqbal.

== Synthesis ==
After the Lahore Resolution in 1940, the demand for a separate homeland for Muslims became stronger. Iqbal's subtle political theory was used as a philosophy behind the creation of Pakistan. Insult of Madani and other nationalist ulama became part of the campaign for Pakistan, and Iqbal's verse and initial remarks were widely used. The last statement of Iqbal was simply ignored. These excerpts clarify that Madani is not advising Indian Muslims to be absorbed and assimilated into one Indian nation and lose their collective existence, reducing the stature of religion as a mere private matter. Iqbal was influenced by ultra-nationalism at the time he was criticising territorial nationalism. Madani's discourse was based on his sincere and pragmatic analysis of India's political situation. Muslims should cooperate with non-Muslims in this political struggle based on the Mithāq-e-Madina (Constitution of Medina), in which Muslims and Jews made an alliance in Madina under the Prophet of Islam. Iqbal himself, in the days when he was responding to Madani's statement, suggested that Mithāq-e-Madina can be a legitimate foundation for the political alliance of the Hindus and Muslims of India. Iqbal's concerns are primarily theoretical; Madani's concerns are fundamentally practical. Disillusioned by the western political theory, Iqbal was trying to build a political theory of Islam as a theoretician. This theory-building is definitely needed in order to develop an Islamic response to modernity. But then there are the immediate issues and problems of the ummah, which demand an appropriate response but within the limitations of the structures imposed by a particular time and space. Iqbal and Madani's roles in history are perhaps slightly different. One is primarily a man of contemplation; the other is fundamentally a man of action. Perhaps they both are needed, as life is action as well as contemplation. It is also observed that after the creation of Pakistan, territory, and watan became the foundation of Pakistani nationalism. According to Sharif al Mujahid, a historian, the two-nation theory had lost its relevance after the creation of Pakistan, because the two nations transformed themselves into Indian and Pakistani nations. Ironically, this supports Madani's theory of nationalism. This kind of territorial nationalism, in which religion is reduced to a private matter, is difficult to be reconciled with Iqbal's discourse. An analysis of Iqbal's verse, writings, letters, and statements suggests that Iqbal was thinking of another world for the sons of Adam. His political theory and critique of modern nation-states are part of his vision of an alternate world. To actualise this vision, he had high hopes for the Muslim community in India. The Indian Muslim community is to become a beginning point of his universal brotherhood which, according to Iqbal, can only be achieved through Islam. But perhaps his philosophical idealism and poetic imagination did not allow him to view the limitations of Indian Muslims and the political realities of his times. Madani, on the other hand, belongs to the tradition of ulama, that from the times of Syed Ahmad Barelvi (1786–1831) remained active and deeply involved in the struggle against the exploitation of Indian Muslims. His works highlight that he was quite clearly aware of the political realities of his times.

== See also ==
- Hindu–Muslim unity
- Index of Muhammad Iqbal–related articles
- Muslim nationalism in South Asia
