= Composite nationalism =

Concept about India as a nation

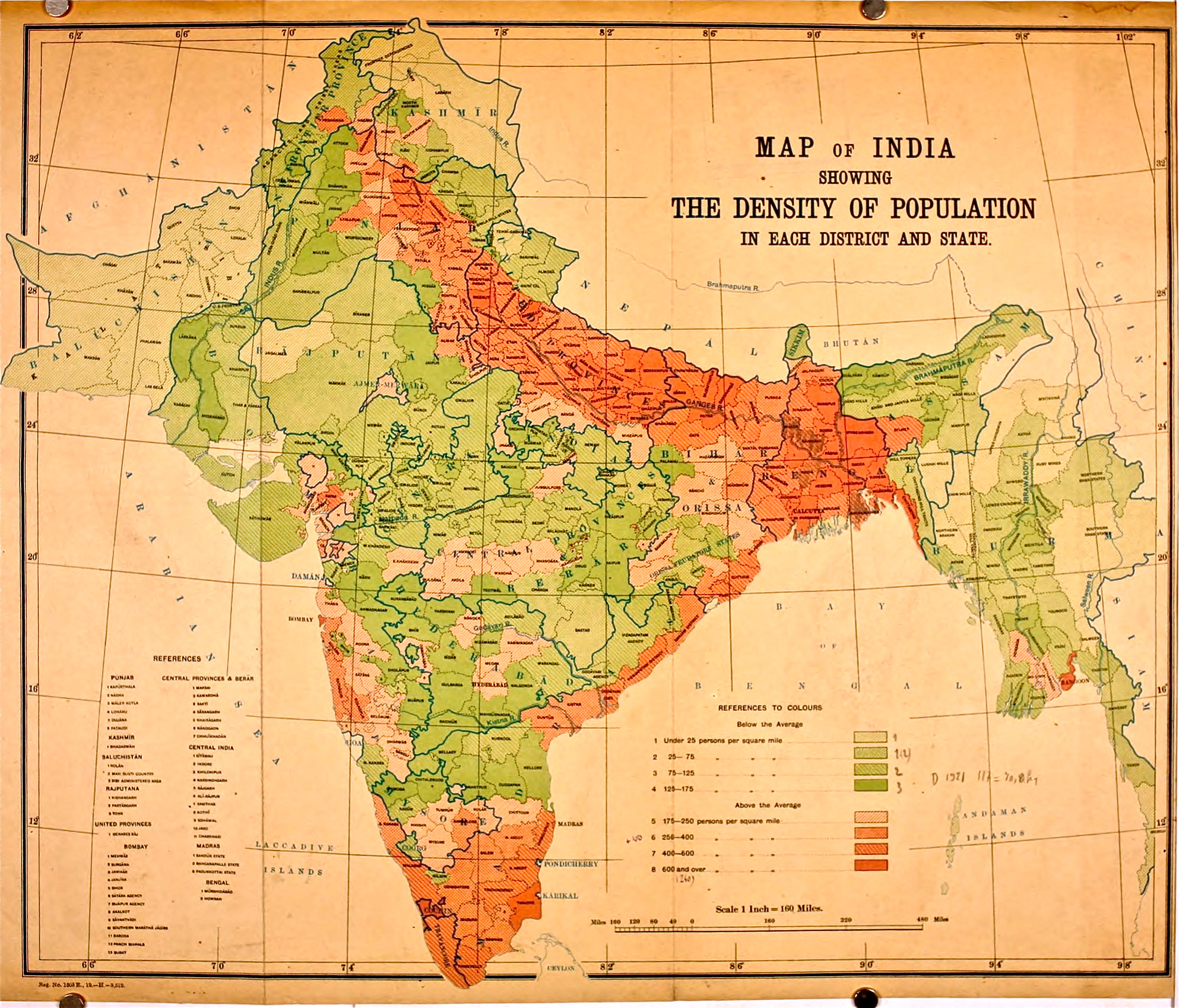
Those who advocated for composite nationalism vehemently opposed the partition of India.

Composite nationalism (Note: Hindustani: mushtareka watanīyat or muttahidāh qaumīyat) is a concept that argues that people of diverse ethnicities, cultures, tribes, castes, communities, and faiths, collectively comprise the Indian nation. The idea teaches that "nationalism cannot be defined by religion in India". While Indian citizens maintain their distinctive religious traditions, they are members of one united Indian nation. Composite nationalism maintains that prior to the arrival of the British into the subcontinent, no enmity between people of different religious faiths existed, and as such, these artificial divisions can be overcome by Indian society.

== History ==
Bipin Chandra Pal put forward the idea of composite patriotism in colonial India in 1906, promulgating the idea that "Hindus, Muslims, Christians, and other religious minorities (including the 'animistic' tribals) should preserve their distinctive religious cultures while fighting together for freedom". David Hardiman, a historian of modern India, writes that prior to the arrival of the British in India, "there was no profound enmity between Hindus and Muslims; the British created divisions". Mahatma Gandhi taught that these "artificial divisions" could be overcome through Hindu-Muslim unity as "religions are different roads converging to the same point". Earlier, Sayyid Jamal al-Din al-Afghani Asadabadi advocated for Hindu-Muslim unity in India as opposed to unity between Indian Muslims and foreign Muslims, holding that Hindu-Muslim unity would be more effective in supporting anti-British movements, leading to an independent India.

Annie Besant, a supporter of both Indian and Irish self-rule championed the concept in 1917, teaching that "Indian youths should be brought up so as 'to make the Mussalman a good Mussalman, the Hindu boy a good Hindu ... Only they must be taught a broad and liberal tolerance as well as enlightened love for their own religion, so that each may remain Hindu or Mussalman, but both be Indian".

The All India Azad Muslim Conference was established in 1929, by the Chief Minister of Sind, Allah Bakhsh Soomro, who founded of the Sind Ittehad Party (Sind United Party), which opposed the partition of India. Allah Bakhsh Soomro, as well as the All India Azad Muslim Conference, advocated for composite nationalism:

Whatever our faiths we must live together in our country in an atmosphere of perfect amity and our relations should be the relations of the several brothers of a joint family, various members of which are free to profess their faith as they like without any let or hindrance and of whom enjoy equal benefits of their joint property.

After Gandhi returned to colonial India he expanded the idea of composite nationalism to include not only religious groups, but castes and other communities. Hardiman writes that this led to a "massive expansion of the nationalist movement in India" with people from all segments of society participating in it.

Composite nationalism was championed by the Islamic scholar and Principal of the Darul Uloom Deoband, Maulana Sayyid Hussain Ahmed Madani. Asgar Ali summarised a key point of Madni's 1938 text Muttahida Qaumiyat Aur Islam, which advocated for composite nationalism in a united India:

Maulana Madani, who wrote a book Muttahida Qaumiyat Aur Islam persuasively argued in favour of composite nationalism by profusely quoting from the Quran the prophets shared the same territory with the unbelievers and hence their Qaumiyal was not different from those who did not believe in their message. According to Maulana Madani, the very spirit of the Koran is to encourage harmonious co-existence in a multi-cultural, multi-racial and multi-religious world.

Fellow Deobandi scholar Mohammad Sajjad, along with Islamic historian Tufail Ahmad Manglori, campaigned for composite nationalism and opposed the Pakistan separatist movement in colonial India, with the latter authoring Rooh-e-Raushan Mustaqbil (Hindustani: روحِ روشن مستقبل (Nastaleeq), रूह-ए-रौशन मुस्तक़बिल (Devanagari)) to convey these Indian nationalistic views.

Abdul Ghaffar Khan, a Pashtun Indian independence activist, along with his Khudai Khidmatgar, heralded composite nationalism, emphasising the fact that Muslims were natives of the Indian subcontinent as with their Hindu brethren.

Saifuddin Kitchlew, a Kashmiri Indian independence activist and president of the Punjab Provincial Congress Committee supported a united Indian movement against British colonial rule and preached that a divided India would weaken Muslims, both economically and politically.

== Contemporary ==
On 15 December 2018, the Jamiat Ulema-e-Hind gathered in the National Capital Territory of Delhi to affirm composite nationalism. The Islamic organisation launched one hundred meetings starting from that date "around the theme of freedom, nationalism and how the organisation can the minority community contribute to nation building".

== Parallels in other nations ==
The concept of composite nationalism as advocated by Gandhi has parallels with the shaping of unified nations in other countries whose peoples comprise subsets of multiple ethnic and religious nations. Especially diverse examples include the shaping of a unified American national identity in the United States centered on democracy and the U.S. Constitution (across many ethnicities and religions) and the shaping of a unified national identity in the Soviet Union according to the ideas of Vladimir Lenin regarding socialist patriotism in a context of proletarian internationalism and the national question in the Soviet Union (as ideas such as those explored in Marxism and the National Question would shape national delimitation in the Soviet Union). Both Gandhi and Lenin sought to unite various nations within a diverse empire to dethrone a ruler that was seen as oppressive, and both would need a vision for why those various nations should remain united once the former state was overthrown (lest they instead form multiple nation states in its wake). Composite nationalism differs from Lenin's theories in that Gandhi maintained that each group should be able to follow their own way of life after Indian independence from British colonial rule had been achieved, whereas Leninism prescribes many political positions that all citizens are bound by.

== See also ==
- Madani–Iqbal debate
- Civic nationalism
- Indian nationalism
- Indian reunification
- Plurinationalism
