= Composite Nationalism and Islam =

1938 book by Husain Ahmad Madani

Muttahida Qaumiyat Aur Islam
- Author: Hussain Ahmad Madani
- Language: Urdu
- Subjects: Islam in India, Indian independence movement, Opposition to the Partition of India
- Publication date: 1938
- Publication place: India
- Media type: Print

Composite Nationalism and Islam (Urdu: متحدہ قومیت اور اسلام) is a book written in 1938 by Hussain Ahmad Madani, the Dean of Darul Uloom Deoband, espousing composite nationalism: a united India for both Muslims and non-Muslims. The book opposed the Partition of India and in it, Madani advocated for "the ideal of a 'composite nationalism' within a united India, which he thought would be more conducive to the spread and prosperity of his community over the entire subcontinent than any religious partition."

The book was translated into English in 2005 by the Jamiat Ulema-e-Hind.

The idea of composite nationalism was and remains influential among the Muslims living in India, with the majority of them staying in independent India despite the partition, rather than migrating to the areas that separated to become Pakistan.

== Arguments ==
Asgar Ali summarized a key point of Composite Nationalism and Islam :

Maulana Madani, who wrote a book [Composite Nationalism and Islam] persuasively argued in favour of composite nationalism by profusely quoting from the Quran the prophets shared the same territory with the unbelievers and hence their Qaumiyat was not different from those who did not believe in their message. According to Maulana Madani, the very spirit of the Koran is to encourage harmonious co-existence in a multi-cultural, multi-racial and multi-religious world.

Composite Nationalism and Islam put forth the idea that different religions do not constitute different nationalities. Rather, "Nationality is co-terminus with territory and both believers and non-believers in Islam can share the same territory and hence the same nationality. Nations, the book argued, are formed on the basis of "a common motherland, language, ethnicity or colour, which brings together Muslims and non-Muslims sharing one or more of these attributes in common."

The proposition for a Partition of India, therefore, did not have any religious justification, but was "purely political." The text emphasized that those who wished to partition India were among the secular elite, rather than religious leaders. Composite Nationalism and Islam opines that the reason the separatists wished to create a new state is because they "were aspiring for power and hence wanted their exclusive domain".

Composite Nationalism and Islam therefore urged its readers to join the Indian National Congress, as its aims were in accordance with Islamic teaching. It implored Muslims not to join the pro-separatist All India Muslim League, which it called hypocritical. The book emphasized that keeping India united would allow Muslims to illumine non-Muslims with what they saw as the true faith.

== Influence ==
The ideas presented in Composite Nationalism and Islam were upheld by the Deobandi movement, whose "priority was an independent India where they could practice Islam without fear or hindrance."

Madani traveled across British India spreading the idea of composite nationalism, which opposed the concept of a partition of India. While he was doing this, members of the pro-separatist Muslim League tried to intimidate Madani and disturb his rallies. The idea of composite nationalism was nevertheless influential among the Muslims living in British India, with the majority of them staying in India after the partition, rather than migrating to the areas that separated to become Pakistan.

== See also ==
- Madani–Iqbal debate
- All India Azad Muslim Conference
- Hindu–Muslim unity
