= Hindu–Muslim unity =

Religiopolitical concept in the Indian subcontinent

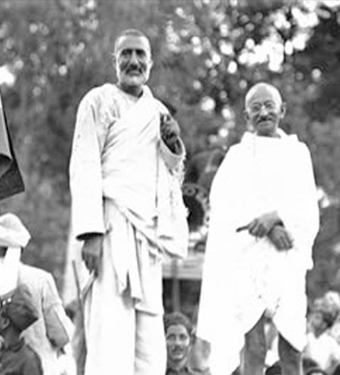
Khan Abdul Ghaffar Khan of the Khudai Khidmatgars and Mohandas Gandhi of the Indian National Congress both strongly championed Hindu–Muslim unity.

Hindu–Muslim unity is a religiopolitical concept in the Indian subcontinent which stresses members of the two largest faith groups there, Hindus and Muslims, working together for the common good. The concept was championed by various persons, such as leaders in the Indian independence movement, namely Mahatma Gandhi and Khan Abdul Ghaffar Khan, as well as by political parties and movements in British India, such as the Indian National Congress, Khudai Khidmatgar and All India Azad Muslim Conference. Those who opposed the partition of India often adhered to the doctrine of composite nationalism.

== History ==
In Mughal India, the emperor Akbar advocated for Hindu–Muslim unity, appointing both Hindus and Muslims as officials in his court. Akbar participated and promoted festivals of both Hinduism and Islam. He also created feasts, such as Phool Walon Ki Sair (although this festival is said to have been started much later in the nineteenth century under Akbar II) to be celebrated by citizens of all faiths. During the Mughal era, Indian art and culture thrived, with the construction of grand monuments such as the Taj Mahal and the Red Fort. The Mughals fostered religious harmony and cultural advancements and nurtured Hindu scholars, poets, and artists, facilitating a dynamic cultural interchange that enriched both Islamic and Hindu traditions.

Chhatrapati Shivaji also promoted Hindu–Muslim unity. Maratha Hindavi Swarajya had many Muslims in high posts. Shivaji's personal security, his most trusted courtiers, were Muslims. A Muslim general had led the Maratha troops in the third battle of Panipat and sacrificed for the cause.

Sayyid Jamal al-Din al-Afghani Asadabadi advocated for Hindu–Muslim unity, maintaining that it would help the Indian independence movement in their goal to establish an independent India.

During the 17th to 19th centuries, India was ruled by the British, who introduced a policy of divide and rule to maintain their control over the country. In the Indian Rebellion of 1857, many Hindus and Muslims of India mobilised together to fight against the East India Company. Reflecting on this in 2007, Manmohan Singh stated that these events "stood as a great testimony to the traditions of Hindu–Muslim unity that held out as an example for subsequent generations".

The Lucknow Pact of 1916 was seen as an "important step forward in achieving Hindu–Muslim unity" during the era of the Indian independence movement. Muhammad Ali Jinnah advocated Hindu–Muslim unity in early years of his political career. Gopal Krishna Gokhale stated that Jinnah "has true stuff in him, and that freedom from all sectarian prejudice which will make him the best ambassador of Hindu–Muslim Unity".

Ram Prasad Bismil and Ashfaqulla Khan emphasised the importance of Hindu-Muslim unity for India's progress and independence. Bismil urged Indians to rise above religious and communal divisions, recognising unity as the foundation for building a strong and free nation. His vision highlighted the need for collective harmony to achieve the common goal of liberation and prosperity for all communities. Hindu-Muslim unity and amity were last wishes of Kakori martyrs.

Muslim scholars of the Deoband school of thought, such as Qari Muhammad Tayyib and Kifayatullah Dihlawi, championed Hindu–Muslim unity, composite nationalism, and called for a united India. Maulana Sayyid Hussain Ahmad Madani, the leader of the Jamiat Ulema-e-Hind, stated:

Hindu-Muslim unity is a prerequisite for freedom of India. It is the religious and political duty of the Muslims that they should work for the freedom of India and continue this struggle until the Government accedes to their demand. It is their duty, which they must do with or without companions, it is the order of the Almighty. If non-Muslims extend to you the hand of friendship, you too must extend yours, for compromising for the right cause will establish you as true believers in Allah.

Malik Khizar Hayat Tiwana, the Premier of Punjab in colonial India, advocated for amity between the religious communities of undivided India, proclaiming 1 March as Communal Harmony Day and aiding in the establishment of a Communal Harmony Committee in Lahore, in which Raja Narendra Nath served as president and Maulvi Mahomed Ilyas as secretary.

In 1940, Maghfoor Ahmad Ajazi established the All-India Jamhur Muslim League to support a united India and to counter the Two nation theory. He served as the first General Secretary of the All India Jamhur Muslim League.

Both Pakistani-American historian Ayesha Jalal and Indian Army officer and politician Jaswant Singh have noted that Muhammad Ali Jinnah did not want the partition of India and instead favored a united India. However, certain political factors, including the strategies of Jawaharlal Nehru, compelled him to accept partition. Jinnah used the demand for Pakistan as a "bargaining chip" to secure rights for Muslims in Hindu-dominated, British-ruled India, where Muslims feared oppression and felt a sense of marginalisation (especially after the conflicts like Hindi-Urdu controversy, which occurred in 1867, just a decade after the 1857 independence war, in which both Muslims and Hindus fought against the British colonialism). The Lahore Resolution, later referred to as the "Pakistan Resolution," did not explicitly demand a separate state, according to Jalal. The term 'Pakistan Resolution' is used for the Lahore Resolution, mostly in Pakistani studies textbooks, which have taught that it was the resolution that passed the demand for Pakistan as a separate state. However, this is not entirely true.

== Threats to Hindu–Muslim unity ==
In the Indian Rebellion of 1857, many Hindus and Muslims in India joined together as Indians to fight against the British East India Company. The British introduced a system of separate electorates, which exacerbated the divide between the Hindu and Muslim communities. The British government became concerned about this rise in Indian nationalism therefore; according to some writers, they tried to stir up communalistic feelings among Hindus and Muslims so that they might not again unite to try and overthrow crown rule. For example, Theodore Beck, the principal of Muhammadan Anglo-Oriental College, had told Syed Ahmad Khan that Muslims should have no sympathy with the objectives of the Indian National Congress and that "Anglo-Muslim unity was possible, but Hindu–Muslim unity was impossible".

The author of Composite Nationalism and Islam, Hussain Ahmad Madani, a Deobandi Muslim scholar and proponent of a united India, argued that the British government were attempting to "scare Muslims into imagining that in a free India, Muslims would lose their separate identity, and be absorbed into the Hindu fold", a threat that "aim[ed] at depoliticising the Muslims, weaning them away from struggle for independence." In the eyes of Madani, support for a two-nation theory resulted in the entrenchment of British imperialism.

In the same vein, Kashmiri Indian politician and Supreme Court judge Markandey Katju wrote in The Nation:

Up to 1857, there were no communal problems in India; all communal riots and animosity began after 1857. No doubt even before 1857, there were differences between Hindus and Muslims, the Hindus going to temples and the Muslims going to mosques, but there was no animosity. In fact, the Hindus and Muslims used to help each other; Hindus used to participate in Eid celebrations, and Muslims in Holi and Diwali. The Muslim rulers like the Mughals, Nawab of Awadh and Murshidabad, Tipu Sultan, etc were totally secular; they organised Ramlilas, participated in Holi, Diwali, etc. Ghalib’s affectionate letters to his Hindu friends like Munshi Shiv Naraln Aram, Har Gopal Tofta, etc attest to the affection between Hindus and Muslims at that time. In 1857, the ‘Great Mutiny’ broke out in which the Hindus and Muslims jointly fought against the British. This shocked the British government so much that after suppressing the Mutiny, they decided to start the policy of divide and rule (see online “History in the Service of Imperialism” by B.N. Pande). All communal riots in India began after 1857, artificially engineered by the British authorities. The British collector would secretly call the Hindu Pandit, pay him money, and tell him to speak against Muslims, and similarly he would secretly call the Maulvi, pay him money, and tell him to speak against Hindus. This communal poison was injected into our body politic year after year and decade after decade.

On the other hand, Ajay Verghese says that the conflicts between the Hindu-Muslim population existed long before arrival of the British to the Indian subcontinent; he says that in places where British had less influence (like the princely states), the number of communal riots was more frequent as compared to places which were directly under British rule (like British Indian provinces). In addition, Hindu nationalists cite the historical persecution of Hindus by Muslim rulers as a basis for their counterattack.

In the same year that the Babri Masjid was destroyed, Indian legal scholar Tahir Mahmood told The New York Times:

There is a very fundamental difference between Hindus and Muslims. If we go by religious beliefs, what is most abhorrent in Islam is idol worship. For our religion it is so abhorrent. For the other it is normal practice. For followers of Islam, they cannot compromise on that. That seems to be the main reason these communities cannot reconcile.

== See also ==
- Composite nationalism
- Cultural appropriation
- Cultural assimilation
- Gandhism
- Ganga-Jamuni tehzeeb
- Hindustani language
- Madani–Iqbal debate
- Opposition to the partition of India
- Phool Walon Ki Sair
- Swaraj
- Samrup Rachna
