= Cooper ministry =

- Government of Bombay Presidency
- Date formed: 1 April 1937
- Date dissolved: 19 July 1937

People and organisations
- Governor: Lord Brabourne
- Prime Minister: Dhanjishah Cooper
- Total no. of members: 4 Cabinet ministers (Incl. Chief Minister)
- Member parties: Independents; DSP; AIML
- Opposition party: Congress

History
- Election: 1937
- Legislature term: 5 years
- Predecessor: None
- Successor: Kher I

Following the 1937 Bombay Presidency elections, Indian National Congress emerged as the largest group in the Bombay Legislative Assembly. However, when its leader B. G. Kher refused to form a government, Governor Lord Brabourne instead invited Dhanjishah Cooper, an independent member from Satara, to be the Presidency's prime minister on 1 April 1937. Cooper accepted and thus, became's Bombay's first prime minister. The four-member ministry he formed shortly resigned due to lack of majority support, and was replaced by Kher's ministry in July 1937.

== Government formation ==
Indian National Congress had secured highest seats in the 1937 elections. However, the party refused to form a government due to disagreements over the Governor's reserve powers as envisioned by the Government of India Act 1935. After Congress' B. G. Kher refused his mandate, the Governor invited the second-largest Muslim League. Citing that the League would be unable to maintain a stable majority, Ali Muhammad Khan Dehlavi refused office as well.

After either party had refused, the Governor invited Cooper to take up premiership. Cooper tried establishing a government of non-Congress parties, including Muslim League and Democratic Swarajya Party. In May 1937, Jamnadas Mehta of Democratic Swaraj Party joined the Cooper ministry on the condition of the unconditional release of Vinayak Damodar Savarkar from detention. Freeing Savarkar from all restrictions was a significant action by the short-lived Cooper ministry.

== List of ministers ==
Cooper's ministry had four cabinet ministers.

Portfolio	Minister	Took office	Left office	Party
Prime Minister	Dhanjishah Cooper	1 April 1937	19 July 1937	Independent
Education	Siddappa Kambli	1 April 1937	19 July 1937	Independent
Finance and Revenue	Jamnadas Mehta	1 April 1937	19 July 1937	DSP
Local Self-government	Hoosenally Rahimtoola	1 April 1937	19 July 1937	AIML
