= Kher ministry =

Kher ministry may refer to these cabinets headed by Indian politician B. G. Kher:

- First Kher ministry (Bombay Presidency) (1937–1939), as prime minister of Bombay Presidency in British India
- Second Kher ministry (Bombay Presidency) (1946–1947), again as prime minister of Bombay Presidency
- Kher ministry (Bombay State) (1947–1952), as the first chief minister of Bombay State in independent India
