= 1920 Indian general election =

- 1920

104 seats contested 53 seats needed for a majority
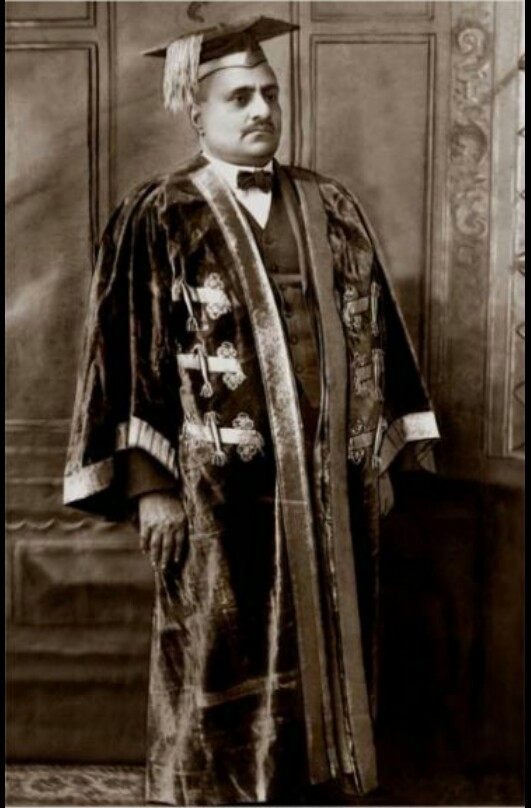

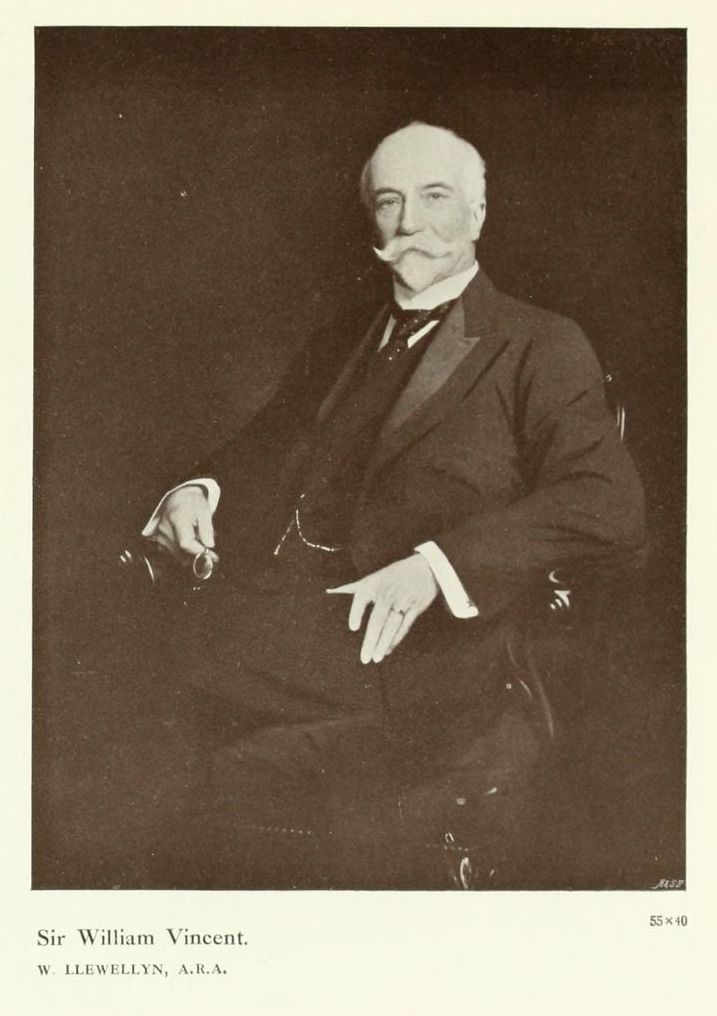
	First party	Second party
Leader	Hari Singh Gour	W. H. H. Vincent
Party	DP	Independent
Seats won	48	47

General elections were held in British India in 1920 to elect members to the Imperial Legislative Council and the provincial Legislative Councils. They were the first elections in the country's modern history.

The new Central Legislative Assembly, which was the lower chamber of the Imperial Legislative Council, was based in Delhi and had 104 elected seats, of which 66 were contested and 38 were reserved for Europeans elected through the Chambers of Commerce. For the upper chamber, the Council of State, 24 of the 34 seats were contested, whilst five were reserved for Muslims, three for Europeans, one for Sikhs, and one for the United Provinces. The Parliament was opened by the Duke of Connaught and Strathearn on 9 February 1921.

Alongside the national elections, there were also elections to 637 seats in provincial assemblies. Of these, 440 were contested, while 188 had a single candidate elected unopposed. Despite the calls by Mahatma Gandhi for a boycott of the elections, only six had no candidate. Within the provincial assemblies, 38 were reserved for European voters.

== Electoral system ==
Single transferable vote (STV) was used on an experimental basis to elect three members of the Legislative Assembly of India for the European constituency of Bengal and to elect four members of the Council of State of India from the non-Muslim constituency of Madras. STV was also used to elect four members of the Legislative Council of Bengal for the European constituency of Bengal.

== Results ==
=== Central Legislative Assembly ===
Party	Seats
Democratic Party	48
Other parties and independents	47
Europeans	9
Total	104
Source: Schwartzberg Atlas

== Members of Central Legislative Assembly ==
=== Officials ===
==== Government of India ====
Member	Office
William Henry Hoare Vincent	Home Member
Sir Malcolm Hailey	Finance Member
Basil Phillott Blackett	Finance Member
C. A. Innes	Commerce and Industries Member
Tej Bahadur Sapru	Law Member
B. N. Sarma	Revenue and Agriculture Member
Denys Bray	Foreign Secretary
Sir Sidney Crookshank	PWD Secretary
Ernest Burdon	Army Secretary
Montagu Sherard Dawes Butler	Education Secretary
G. R. Clarke	Director General Posts and Telegraph
Atul Chandra Chatterjee	Industries Secretary
G. G. Sim	Jt. Finance Secretary
John Hullah	Revenue and Agriculture Secretary
A. V. V. Aiyer	Finance Department
M. H. H. Hutchinson	
Colonel W. D. Waghorn	
Abdul Rahim Khan	
Francis Bradley Bradley-Birt	
Thomas Henry Holland	
R. W. Davies	
P. E. Percival	
H. P. Tollinton	
F. S. A Slocock	
W. C. Renouf	

==== Nominated from Provinces ====
Member	Province
B. C. Allen	Assam
Khabeeruddin Ahmed	Bengal
Khagendra Nath Mitter	Bengal
J. K. N. Kabraji	Bombay
Walter Frank Hudson	Bombay
William John Keith	Burma
J. F. Bryant	Madras
T. E. Moir	Madras
Theodore Alban Henry Way	United Provinces
Rustomji Faridoonji	Central Provinces

=== Nominated non-officials ===
- Special Interests: Henry Gidney (Anglo-Indian), N. M. Joshi (Labour Interests), J. P. Cotelingam (Indian Christians), Rai Sheo Prasad Tulshan Bahadur (Railway Interests)
- Provinces: T. V. Seshagiri Iyer (Madras), C. Krishnaswami Rao (Madras), Ashraf O. Jamall (Bengal), Nawab Khwaja Habibullah (Bengal), N. M. Samarth (Bombay), Mahomed Hajeebhoy (Bombay), Maulvi Abdul Quadir (Central Provinces), Lakshmi Narayan Lal (Bihar & Orissa), Sardar Bahadur Gajjan Singh (Punjab), Rana Umanath Bakhsh Singh (United Provinces), B. H. R. Jatkar (Berar), Abdur Rahim (North West Frontier Province)

=== Elected non-officials ===
- Assam: Debi Charan Barua (Assam Valley General), Girish Chandra Nag (Surma Valley General), Maulvi Amjad Ali (Muslim), George Bridge (European), Lt. Col. D. Herbert (European)
- Bengal: Sir Deva Prosad Sarbadhicari (Calcutta Urban General), Jogendra Nath Mukherjee (Calcutta Suburbs Urban General), K. C. Neogy (Dacca Rural General), Jadunath Majumdar (Presidency General), Tara Prosanna Mukherji (Burdwan General), Jogesh Chandra Chaudhuri (Chittagong & Rajshahi Rural General), Prince Afsar-ul-Mulk Mirza Muhammad Akram Hussain (Calcutta & Suburbs Muslim), Zahiruddin Ahmed (Dacca Muslim), Maulvi Abul Kasem (Dacca Rural Muslim), Khabeeruddin Ahmed (Rajshahi Muslim), Saiyed Muhammad Abdulla (Burdwan & Calcutta Presidency Muslim), Munshi Abdul Rahman (Chittagong Muslim), Ghani Khan Gabkhan (Bakerganj Muslim re-polls), Darcy Lindsay (European), Frank Carter (European), W. S. J. Wilson (European), A. D. Pickford (European), R. J. G. Ballantyne (European), Satish Chandra Ghosh (Landholders), Nibaran Chandra Sircar (Bengal National Chamber of Commerce), D. K. Mitter
- Bihar & Orissa: Babu Baidyanath Prashad Singh (Tirhut General), Babu Adit Prashad Sinha (Tirhut General), B. N. Misra (Orissa General), Braja Sundar Das (Orissa General), Rai Bahadur Lachmi Prasad Sinha (Gaya cum Monghyr General), Sarfaraz Hussain Khan (Tirhut Muslim), Maulvi Miyan Asjad-ul-lah (Bhagalpur Muslim), Syed Muhammad Ismail (Patna and Chota Nagpur cum Orissa Muslim), Raja R. N. Bhanja Deo (Landholders), Raja Sivanandan Prasad Singh (Landholders), Babu Ambika Prasad Sinha, Satya Narain Singh
- Bombay: Sir Jamsetjee Jejeebhoy (Bombay City General), Chimanlal Harilal Setalvad (Bombay City General), Jamnadas Dwarkadas Dharamsy (Bombay City General), Keshao Ganesh Bagde (Bombay Central Rural), Balkrishna Sitaram Kamat (Bombay Central Rural), Sardar Bomanji Ardeshir Dalal (Bombay Northern Rural), Anna Babaji Latthe (Bombay Southern Rural), Seth Harchandrai Vishandas (Sind Rural General), Salebhoy Karimji Barodawala (Bombay City Muslim), Sardar Gulam Jilani Bijlikhan (Bombay Central Muslim), Shaikh Abdul Majid (Sind Urban Muslim), Alibaksh Mahomed Hussein (Sind Rural Muslim), Wali Mohamed Hussanally (Sind Rural Muslim), Reginald Arthur Spence (European), Edwin Lessware Price (European), Sir Montagu de Pomeray Webb (European), Nowroji Saklatwala (Bombay Millowners Association), Rahimtoola Currimbhoy (Bombay Millowners Association), Vithaldas Thackersey (Bombay Millowners Association), Manmohandas Ramji (Indian Merchants Chamber), S. C. Shahani (Sind Jagirdars & Zamindars)
- Burma: F. McCarthy (Europeans), Padamji Ginwala (General), Maung Maung Sin (General), J. C. Chatterji (General), J. N. Basu (General)
- Central Provinces: Hari Singh Gour (Nagpur General), Kunj Bihari Lall Agnihotri (Hindi Divisions General), Pyari Lal Misra (Hindi Divisions General), Muhammad Ahsan Khan (Muslim), Beohar Raghubir Sinha (Landholders)
- Madras: T. Rangachari (Madras City General), C. S. Subrahmanayam (Madras ceded districts & Chittoor Rural General), Patri Venkata Srinivasa Rao (Guntur cum Nellore General), B. Venkatapatiraju (Ganjam cum Kistna General), Jayanthi Ramayya Pantulu (Godavari cum Krishna General), Sambanda Mudaliar (Salem & Coimbatore General), P. S. Sivaswami Iyer (Tanjore & Trichy General), M. Krishnaswamy Reddi (Chingleput cum South Arcot General), K. M. Nayar (West Coast & Nilgiris General), T. Muhammad Hussain Saheb Bahadur (Madras Muslim), Mahmood Schamnad Saheb Bahadur (West Coast & Nilgiris Muslim), Mir Asad Ali (Muslim), Muhammad Habibullah (Muslim), R. E. V. Arbuthnot (Commerce), Narayandas Girdhardas (Commerce), Eardley Norton (European), Rama Varma Valia Raja Chirakkal (Landholders)
- Punjab: Pandit Jawahar Lal Bhargava (Ambala General), Bakshi Sohan Lal (Jullundur General), Dr. Nand Lal (West Punjab General), Chaudhari Ghulam Sarwar Khan (North Punjab Muslim), Ahmad Baksh Khan (North West Punjab Muslim), Chaudhri Shahab-ud-din (East Central Punjab Muslim), Nawab Mohammad Ibrahim Ali Khan (East Punjab Muslim), Chaudhri Shahab-ud-din (East Central Punjab Muslim), Makhdum Syed Rajan Baksh Shah (South West Punjab Muslim), Raja M. M. Ikramullah Khan, Bhai Man Singh (East Punjab Sikh), Sardar Gulab Singh (West Punjab Sikh), Baba Ujagar Singh Bedi (Landholders)
- United Provinces: Munshi Iswar Saran (UP Cities General), Pyare Lal (Meerut Rural General), Lala Girdharilal Agarwala (Agra General), Pandit Radha Kishen Das (Rohilkund & Kumaon General), Bishambhar Nath (Allahabad and Jhansi General), Sankata Prasad Bajpai (Lucknow General), Munshi Mahadeo Prasad (Benaras and Gorakhpur General), Raja Suraj Baksh Singh (Fyzabad General), Haji Wajihuddin (UP Cities Muslim), Muhammad Yamin Khan (Meerut Muslim), Mohammad Faiyaz Khan (Agra Muslim), Syed Nabi Hadi (Rohilkund & Kumaon Muslim), S. M. Zahid Ali Subzposh (UP Southern Muslim), Syed Haider Karrar Jafri (Lucknow and Fyzabad Muslim), Raja Kushal Pal Singh (Landholders), Sir Logie Pirie Watson (European)

== See also ==
- 1920 Madras Presidency legislative council election
