= Desai ministry (Bombay State) =

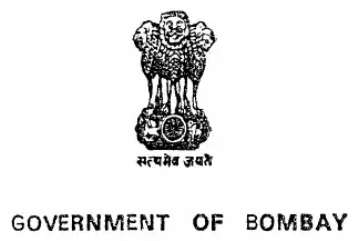
- Government of Bombay State
- Date formed: 21 April 1952
- Date dissolved: 31 October 1956

People and organisations
- Governor: Raja Maharaj Singh (1952); Girija Shankar Bajpai (1952-54); Harekrushna Mahatab (1955-56)
- Chief Minister: Morarji Desai
- Total no. of members: 20; 10 Cabinet ministers (Incl. Chief Minister); 10 Deputy ministers
- Member parties: Congress
- Status in legislature: Majority government
- Opposition party: PWPI
- Opposition leader: Tulsidas Jadhav

History
- Election: 1952
- Legislature term: 5 years
- Predecessor: Kher
- Successor: Chavan I

Morarji Desai became the Chief Minister of Bombay State on 21 April 1952, following the Indian National Congress' victory in 1952 Bombay Legislative Assembly election. He formed a nine-member ministry that continued till his resignation on 31 October 1956. Yashwantrao Chavan succeeded him as the head of government.

== Government formation ==
B. G. Kher, Bombay's chief minister since 1946, did not seek another term and retired following the 1952 election. Desai had been Kher's home and revenue minister since 1946, and had previously served as agriculture, revenue, and rural development minister from 1937 to 1939. He was selected to replace Kher.

In October 1956, the Desai government faced a motion of no confidence tabled by Naushir Bharucha. The same was defeated in the assembly by 33 to 234 votes.

Motion of no-confidence Morarji Desai (Congress)
Ballot →	15 to 16 October 1956
Required majority →	Simple majority
Yes	33 / 267
No	234 / 267

== List of ministers ==
Sr	Minister	Constituency (Region)	Portfolio	Party	Reference
Chief Minister
1	Morarji Desai	Bulsar Chikhli (Seat 2) (Gujarat)	Chief Minister	Congress	
Cabinet ministers
2	Jivraj Mehta	Amreeli Damnagar (Gujarat)	Finance; Industry; Prohibition	Congress	
3	Yashwantrao Chavan	Karad North (Maharashtra)	Civil Supplies; Local Self-Government; Forests; Community Projects	Congress	
4	Shantilal Shah	Vile Parle Andheri Versova (Bombay)	Labour; Public Health	Congress	
5	B. S. Hiray	South Malegaon North Nandgaon (Maharashtra)	Revenue; Agriculture	Congress	
6	Malojirao Naik Nimbalkar	Phaltan (Maharashtra)	Public Works	Congress	
7	Ganpatrao Devji Tapase	Phaltan (Seat 2) (Maharashtra)	Rehabilitation; Fisheries; Backward Classes	Congress	
8	Dinkarrao N. Desai	Broach (Gujarat)	Education; Law; Aarey Milk Colony	Congress	
9	M. P. Patil	Hukeri (Karnataka)	Local Self-Government; Cooperation	Congress	

=== Deputy ministers ===
Sr	Deputy Minister	Constituency (Region)	Portfolio	Party	Reference
1	Indumati Seth	Ahmedabad City III (Gujarat)	Education	Congress	
2	Babubhai J. Patel	Nadiad South (Gujarat)	Public Works; Public Transport	Congress	
3	D. N. Wandrekar	Bandra Khar Juhu (Maharashtra)	Backward Classes	Congress	
4	K. F. Patil	Ranebennur (Karnataka)	Agriculture; Forests	Congress	
5	B. D. Jatti	Jamkhandi (Karnataka)	Public Health	Congress	
6	B. D. Deshmukh	Parola (Maharashtra)	Local Self-Government; Cooperation	Congress	
7	T. R. Naravane	Dadar Saitanchowky (Bombay)	Prohibition	Congress	
8	Mustafa Faki	Bhivandi Murbad East Kalyan (Maharashtra)	Revenue	Congress	
9	V. K. Sathe	Poona City Central (Maharashtra)	Civil Supplies	Congress	
10	Nirmala Raje Bhosale	North Sholapur (Maharashtra)	Parliamentary Secretary to the Chief Minister	Congress	
