= First Kher ministry (Bombay Presidency) =

- Government of Bombay Presidency
- Date formed: 19 July 1937
- Date dissolved: 2 November 1939

People and organisations
- Governor: Robert Duncan Bell (1937); The Earl of Scarbrough (1937-39)
- Prime Minister: B. G. Kher
- Total no. of members: 7 Cabinet ministers (Incl. Chief Minister); 6 Parliamentary secretaries
- Member parties: Congress
- Opposition party: AIML
- Opposition leader: Ali Muhammad Khan Dehlavi

History
- Election: 1937
- Legislature term: 5 years
- Predecessor: Cooper
- Successor: Kher II (1946)

B. G. Kher became the Prime Minister of the Bombay Presidency for the first time on 19 July 1937. The 7-member government resigned in November 1939 to protest the inclusion of British India in the Second World War.

== List of ministers ==
The first Kher ministry consisted of the following:

Portfolio	Minister	Took office	Left office	Party
Prime Minister; Education	B. G. Kher	19 July 1937	2 November 1939	INC
Finance	A. B. Latthe	19 July 1937	2 November 1939	INC
Home and Legal	K. M. Munshi	19 July 1937	2 November 1939	INC
Health and Excise	M. D. Gilder	19 July 1937	2 November 1939	INC
Revenue, Rural Development, and Agriculture	Morarji Desai	19 July 1937	2 November 1939	INC
Public Works	M. Y. Nuri	19 July 1937	2 November 1939	INC
Local Self-government and Miscellaneous	L. M. Patel	19 July 1937	2 November 1939	INC

=== Parliamentary Secretaries ===
The ministry additionally included six parliamentary secretaries.

- Gulzarilal Nanda
- B. M. Gupte
- Hansa Mehta
- M. P. Patil
- T. R. Nesvi
- B. S. Hiray
