= 1937 Bombay Presidency legislative election =

Election in 1937

1937 Bombay Presidency legislative assembly election
- 1937

All 175 seats in the Legislative Assembly of Bombay Presidency 88 seats needed for a majority
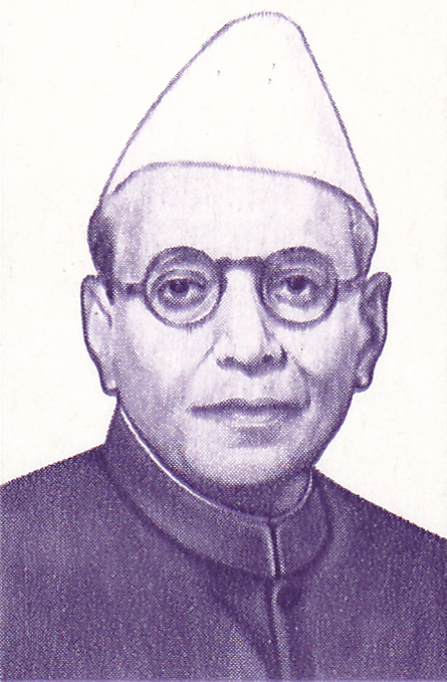
	First party	Second party
Leader	B.G Kher	Ali Muhammad Khan Dehlavi
Party	INC	AIML
Leader's seat	Bombay City North and Bombay Suburban District	Surat and Rander Cities, Urban
Seats won	86	20
Elected Prime Minister
B.G.Kher
INC

The elections to the two houses of legislatures of the Bombay Presidency were held in 1937, as part of the nationwide provincial elections in British India. The Indian National Congress was the single largest party by winning 86 of 175 seats in the Legislative Assembly and 13 of 60 seats in the Legislative Council.

The Congress Government that was formed after the elections under B. G. Kher lasted till October 1939, when it resigned protesting India's involvement in the Second World War. The next election was held in 1946.

== Government of India Act of 1935 ==
The Government of India Act of 1935 abolished dyarchy and ensured provincial autonomy. It created a bicameral legislature in the Bombay province. The Legislature consisted of the Governor and two Legislative bodies - a Legislative Assembly and a Legislative Council. The Assembly consisted of 175 members who were further classified into General seats and those reserved for special communities and interests. The Legislative Council consisted of 60 members. It was a permanent body not subject to dissolution by the Governor. The Act provided for a limited adult franchise based on property qualifications.

== Results ==
The Congress contested 110 out of the total 175 seats in the assembly out of which 97 were general constituencies. For the council, it contested 15 out of the 26 seats where elections took place.

In the assembly, 15 seats were reserved for the Scheduled Castes. Out of these, Congress Party secured one seat unopposed and contested 8 seats out of which it won 5.

=== Legislative Assembly ===
Party wise break up of seats in the Bombay Legislative Assembly:

Total Number of Seats : 175

Party	Seats
Indian National Congress	88
Independents	32
Muslim League	20
Independent Labour Party	12
Europeans, Anglo-Indians and Indian Christians	8
Non-Brahman	8
Democratic Swarajya Party	5
Peasants Party	2
Total	175
Source: Schwartzberg Atlas

=== MLAs elected ===
Reservation	Constituency	Member
	Bombay City (Byculla and Parel)	
Hindu		Dr. Bhimrao Ramji Ambedkar
Hindu	Bombay City (Fort, Mandvi, Girgaum and Bhlueshwar)	
Hindu	Bombay City North and Bombay Suburban	
Hindu	Ahmedabad City	
Hindu	Poona City	
Hindu	Sholapur City	
Hindu	Surat amd Rander Cities	
Hindu	Ahmedabad North	
Hindu	Ahmedabad North	
Hindu	Ahmedabad South	
Hindu	Ahmednagar North	
Hindu	Ahmednagar North	
Hindu	Ahmednagar North	
Hindu	Ahmednagar North	
Hindu	Ahmednagar South	
Hindu	Ahmednagar South	
Hindu	Belgaum North	
Hindu	Belgaum North	
Hindu	Belgaum South	
Hindu	Belgaum South	
Hindu	Bharuch	
Hindu	Bijapur North	
Hindu	Bijapur South	
Hindu	Dharwad North	
Hindu	Dharwad North	
Hindu	Dharwad North	
Hindu	Dharwad North	
Hindu	Dharwad North	
Hindu	Dharwad South	
Hindu	Dharwad South	
Hindu	Dharwad South	
Hindu	East Khandesh East	
Hindu	East Khandesh East	
Hindu	East Khandesh West	
Hindu	East Khandesh West	
Hindu	East Khanesh West	
Hindu	Kaira	
Hindu	Kaira	
Hindu	Kanara	
Hindu	Kanara	
Hindu	Kanara	
Hindu	Kolaba	
Hindu	Nashik East	
Hindu	Nashik East	
Hindu	Nashik West	
Hindu	Nashik West	
Hindu	Nashik West	
Hindu	Nashik West	
Hindu	Panchmahal East	
Hindu	Panchmahal West	
Hindu	Panchmahal West	
Hindu	Poona East	
Hindu	Poona East	
Hindu	Poona West	
Hindu	Ratnagiri North	
Hindu	Ratnagiri North	
Hindu	Ratnagiri North	
Hindu	Ratnagiri South	
Hindu	Ratnagiri South	
Hindu	Satara North	
Hindu	Satara South	
Hindu	Satara South	
Hindu	Sholapur North East	
Hindu	Sholapur North East	
Hindu	Sholapur North East	
Hindu	Sholapur South West	
Hindu	Sholapur South West	
Hindu	Surat	
Hindu	Surat	
Hindu	Surat	
Hindu	Surat	
Hindu	Thane North	
Hindu	Thane South	
Hindu	Thane South	
Hindu	West Khandesh East	
Hindu	West Khandesh East	
Hindu	West Khandesh West	
Hindu	Bombay City (Girgaum) women	Annapurna Gopal Deshmukh
Hindu	Bombay City (Bhuleshwar) women	Lilavati Kanaiyalal Munshi
Hindu	Poona City women	Lakshmibai Ganesh Thuse
Hindu	Ahmedabad City women	Vijayagauri Balvantrai Kanuga
Hindu	Dharwad women	Nagamma Veerangouda Patil
Muslim	Bombay City North and Bombay Suburban	Khan Bahadur Ali Bahadur
Muslim		Muhammad Musa Qilledar
Muslim	Bombay City South	Hussain Abubakr Beg Muhammad
Muslim		Muhammad Ali Allah Baksh
Muslim	Ahmedabad City	Muhammad Yasin Nuri
Muslim	Surat and Rander Cities	Sir Ali Muhammad Khan Dehlavi
Muslim	Ahmedabad	Ismail Ibrahim Chundrigar
Muslim	Ahmednagar	Muhammadbawa Madhubawa Patel
Muslim	Belgaum	Abdul Majid Abdul Kader Gheewale
Muslim	Bharuch	Musaji Yusufji Patel
Muslim	Bijapur	Allisa Nabisa Ilkal
Muslim		Khalilullah Abasheb Janvekar
Muslim	Dharwad	Abdul Karim.Aminsab Hanagi
Muslim	East Khandesh	Sheikh Muhammad Hasan
Muslim		Muhammad Sulaiman Qasim Mitha
Muslim	Kaira	Khan Sahib Faiz Muhammad Mahobat Khan
Muslim	Kolaba	Mohsin Muhammad Bhaiji
Muslim	Nashik	Khan Sahib Abdul Rahim Babu Hakim
Muslim	Panchmahal	Khan Sahib Abdullah Haji Isa Bhagat
Muslim	Ratnagiri	Aziz Gafur Kazi
Muslim	Sholapur	Khan Bahadur Abdul Haji Hajrat Khan
Muslim	Surat	Ahmed Ebrahim Singapori
Muslim	Thane	Khan Bahadur Sardar Haji Amirsaheb Mohiuddin Saheb Raees
Muslim	West Khandesh	Khwaja Bashiruddin Khwaja Moinuddin Kazi
Muslim	Bombay City women	Salima Faiz Badruddin Tyabji
Indian Christian	Bombay City	Dr. Joseph Altino Collaco
Indian Christian	Bombay Suburban cum Thane	Dominic Joseph Ferreira
Indian Christian	Poona cum Ahmednagar	Bhaskarrao Bhaurao Chakranarayan
Anglo Indian	Bombay City cum Bombay Suburban	Stanley Henry Prater
Anglo Indian	Presidency	Fred J Currion
European	Bombay City cum Bombay Suburban	W. W. Russell
European	Presidency	Francis Holroy French
European	Presidency	David Watson
European	Presidency	Cyril Frederick Golding
Commerce	Bombay Chamber of Commerce and Bombay Presidency Trades Association	Sir John Abercromble
Commerce	Bombay Chamber of Commerce and Bombay Presidency Trades Association	J. B. Greaves
Commerce	Bombay Chamber of Commerce and Bombay Presidency Trades Association	Donald Hill
Commerce	Ahmedabad Millowners' Association	Sakarlal Balabhai
Commerce	Bombay Millowners' Association	Sorabji Dorabji Saklatwala (brother of Shapurji Saklatwala)
Commerce	East India Cotton Association	Bhavanji Arjan Khimji
Commerce	Indian Merchants' Chamber	M. C. Ghia
Landowners	Deccan Sardars and Inamdars	Sardar Narayan Ganpatrao Vinchurkar
Landowners	Gujarat Sardars and Inamdars	Baronet Girijaprasad Chinubhai Madhavlal
Labour	Ahmedabad Textile Unions	Gulzarilal Nanda
Labour	Ahmedabad Textile Unions	Khondubhai Kasanji Desai
Labour	Railways Union	Jamnadas Mehta
Labour	Railways Union	Shavaksha Hormusji Jhabvala
Labour	Bombay City and Suburban Textile Unions	Dadasaheb Khaserao Jagtap
Labour	Sholapur City Textile Labour	Ramchandra Amarji Khedgikar
Labour	Trade Union of Seamen and Dockworkers of Bombay	Akhtar Hasan Mirza
Bombay University		Kanaiyalal Maneklal Munshi

- General (115):
  - Ahmedabad: Ganesh Vasudev Mavalankar (Ahmedabad City, Urban) (Speaker), Trikamlal Ugarchand Vakil (Ahmedabad City), Hariprasad Pitamber Mehta (Ahmedabad North), Bhogilal Dhirajlal Lala (Ahmedabad North), Ishvarlal Kalidas Vyas (Ahmedabad South)
  - Ahmednagar: Laxman Madhav Patil (Ahmednagar North), Keshav Balwant Deshmukh (Ahmednagar North, General Rural), Ramchandra Bhagwant Girme (Ahmednagar North, General Rural), Namdeo Eknath Navle (Ahmednagar North), Prabhakar Janardan Roham (Ahmednagar South, General Rural), Ganesh Krishna Chitale (Ahmednagar South), Kundanmal Sobhachand Firodia (Ahmednagar South)
  - Belgaum: Anna Babaji Latthe (Belgaum North), Balwant Hanmant Varale (Belgaum North), Narayanrao Gururao Joshi (Belgaum North) (Deputy Speaker), Malgouda Pungouda Patil (Belgaum North), Keshav Govind Gokhale (Belgaum South, General Rural), Parappa Chanbasappa Jakati (Belgaum South, Rural), Kallangouda Shiddangouda Patil (Belgaum South)
  - Bijapur: Murigeppa Shiddappa Sugandhi (Bijapur North), Revappa Somappa Kale (Bijapur North), Shankreppagouda Basalingappagouda Desai (Bijapur South, General Rural), Shankargouda Timmangouda Patil (Bijapur South)
  - Bombay: Khurshed Nariman (Bombay City (Fort, Mandvi, Bhuleshwar and Girgaum)), S. K. Patil (Bombay City (Fort, Mandvi, Bhuleshwar and Girgaum)), Nagindas Tribhuvandas Master (Bombay City (Fort, Mandvi, Bhuleshwar and Girgaum)), B. R. Ambedkar (Bombay City (Byculla & Parel) General Urban), Dr. Manchersha Dhanjibhoy Gilder (Bombay City (Byculla & Parel) General Urban), B.G. Kher (Bombay City North and Bombay Suburban District), Dattatraya Wandrekar (Bombay City North and Bombay Suburban District), Savlaram Gundaji Songavkar (Bombay City North and Bombay Suburban District),
  - Broach: Chhotalal Balkrishna Purani (Broach Sub-division, General Rural)
  - Dharwar: Siddappa Kambli (Dharwar North, Rural), Andaneppa Dnyanappa Dodmeti (Dharwar North, General Rural), Girimallappa Rachappa Nalwadi (Dharwar North, General Rural), Vishwanathrao Narayanrao Jog (Dharwar North), Shripad Shyamji Kargudri (Dharwar South, Rural), Thimmappa Rudrappa Neshvi (Dharwar South)
  - Kaira: Bhailbhai Ukabhai Vaghela (Kaira District, General Rural), Babubhai Jasbhai Patel, Bhailalbhai Bhikabhai Patel, Fulsinhji Dabhi,
  - Kanara: Sheshgiri Narayanrao Keshwain (Kanara District, General Rural), Mahableshwar Ganpati Bhatt Gopi (Kanara District, General Rural), Ningappa Fakeerappa Hallikeri
  - Khandesh: Gulabsing Bhila Girasey (West Khandesh East, General Rural), Namdeorao Budhajirao Marathe (West Khandesh East), Raghunath Balkrishna Wadekar (West Khandesh East), Damji Posala Gavit (West Khandesh West), Mangesh Babhuta Patel (West Khandesh West), Daulatrao Gulaji Jadhav (East Khandesh East, General Rural), Rajmal Lakhichand Marwadi (East Khandesh East), Dhanaji Nana Choudhari (East Khandesh East), Hari Vinayak Pataskar (East Khandesh West), Gambhirrao Avachitrao Patil (East Khandesh West), Narhar Rajaram Patil (East Khandesh West), Maganlal Nagindas (East Khandesh West),
  - Kolaba: Ramchandra Narayan Mandlik, Laxman Govind Patil, Dattatraya Kashinath Kunte, Kamalaji Ragho Talkar
  - Nasik: Raosaheb Bhausaheb Thorat (Nasik East, General Rural), Lalchand Hirachand (Nasik East, General Rural), Bhaurao Sakharam Hiray (Nasik East), Govind Hari Deshpande (Nasik West, General Rural), Vasant Narayan Naik (Nasik West, General Rural), Bhaurao Krishnaji Gaikwad (Nasik West), Prithwiraj Amolakchand Nimanee (Nasik West)
  - Panch Mahals: Laxmidas Mangaldas Shrikant (Panch Mahals East, General Rural), Wamanrao Sitaram Mukadam (Panch Mahals West, General Rural), Maneklal Gandhi (Panch Mahals West)
  - Poona: Bhalchandra Maheshwar Gupte (Poona City, General Urban), Vithalrao Laxmanrao Thube (Poona West, General Rural), Hari Vithal Tulpule (Poona West, General Rural), Balaji Bhawansa Walwekar (Poona East, Rural), Appaji Yeshwantrao Kate (Poona East), Vinayak Atmaram Gadkari (Poona East)
  - Ratnagiri: Babjeerao Narayanrao Rane (Ratnagiri North, General Rural), Shivram Laxman Karandikar (Ratnagiri North, Rural), Gangadhar Raghoram Ghatge (Ratnagiri North), Anant Vinayak Chitre (Ratnagiri North), Bachajee Ramchandra Rane (Ratnagiri South, General Rural), Purshottam Wasudeo Wagh (Ratnagiri South), Shankar Krishnaji Gavankar (Ratnagiri South), Shamrao Vishnu Parulekar (Ratnagiri South)
  - Satara: Dhanjishah Bomanjee Cooper (Satara North), Shankar Hari Sathe (Satara North, General Rural), Khanderao Sakharam Savat (Satara North, General Rural), Bajirao Jagdeorao Shinde (Satara North, General Rural), Pandurang Keshav Shiralkar (Satara South, General Rural), Shankar Pandurang Mohite (Satara South, General Rural), Annappa Narayan Kalyani (Satara South), Atmaram Nana Patil (Satara South), Ramchandra Krishna Karavade (Satara South)
  - Solapur: Krisnaji Bhimrao Antrolikar (Solapur City, General Urban), Jivappa Subhana Aidale (Solapur North-east, General Rural), Bhagwan Sambhuppa Kathale (Solapur North-east, General Rural), Tulshidas Subhanrao Jadhav (Solapur North-east), Jayavant Ghanshyam More (Solapur South-west, General Rural), Dattatraya Trimbak Aradhye (Solapur South-west)
  - Surat: Champaklal Jeikisandas Ghia (Surat & Rander Cities, Urban), Morarji Desai (Surat District, General Rural), Morarbhai Kasanji (Surat District, General Rural), Randhir Prasavandas Desai (Surat District, General Rural), Purushottam Lalji Chohan (Surat District)
  - Thana: Dattatraya Waman Raut (Thana North, General Rural), Govind Dharmaji Vartak (Thana North, Rural), Vishnu Vaman Dandekar (Thana North), Kanji Govind Shet (Thana South, General Rural), Ganesh Krishna Phadke (Thana South)
- Muhammadan (29):
  - Urban: Husein Aboobaker Baig Mohamed (Bombay City South, Muhammadan Urban), Mohamedally Allabux (Bombay City South, Urban), Mahmad Yasin Nurie (Ahmedabad City, Urban), Ali Muhammad Khan Dehlavi (Surat and Rander Cities, Urban)
  - Rural: Ibrahim Ismail Chundrigar (Ahmedabad District, Rural), Mahomedbawa Madhubawa Patel (Ahmednagar District), Abdulmajeed Abdulkhadar Gheewale (Belgaum District), Allisa Nabisa Ilkal (Bijapur District, Muhammadan Rural), Khalilulla Abasheb Janvekar (Bijapur District), Ali Bahadur Bahadur Khan (Bombay City North and Bombay Suburban District Urban Muhammadan Rural), Mahomed Musa Killedar (Bombay City North and Bombay Suburban District), Asmal Musa Abhram (Broach Sub-division, Muhammadan Rural), Musaji Eusufji Patel (Broach Sub-division), Sardar Mahaboobali Khan Akbarkhan Savanur (Dharwar District, Muhammadan Rural), Abdul Karim Aminsab Hanagi (Dharwar District), Khan Saheb Faiz Mahamadkhan Mahobatkhan (Kaira District, Muhammadan Rural), Ismail Hassan Bapu Shiddika (Kanara District, Muhammadan Rural), Ismail Hasan Siddiqui (Kanara District), Shaikh Mohamad Hasan (East Khandesh District, Muhammadan Rural), Mohemed Suleman Cassum Mitha (East Khandesh District), Shaikh Mohamad Hasan (East Khandesh District), Mohsin Mohamed A. Bhaiji (Kolaba District), Khwaja Bashiruddin Khwaja Moinuddin Kazi (West Khandesh District, Muhammadan Rural), Fazal Ibrahim Rahimtoola (Kolaba District, Muhammadan Rural), Abdul Rahim Baboo Hakeem (Nasik District), Abdulla Haji Isa Bhagat (Panch Mahals Sub-division), Khan Bahadur Shaikh Jan Mahomed Haj Shaikh Kalla (Poona District, Muhammadan Rural), Aziz Gofur Kazi (Ratnagiri District, Muhammadan Rural), Haji Ahmad Kasam Kachhi (Satara District), Yusuf Abdulla (Satara District), Abdul Latif Haji Hajrat Khan (Solapur District, Muhammadan Rural), Ahmed Ebrahim Singapori (Surat District), Sardar Haji Amirsaheb Mohiddin Saheb Rais (Thana District, Muhammadan Rural)

=== Legislative Council ===
Party	Hindu	Muslim	European	Total
Indian National Congress	13	-	-	13
All India Muslim League	-	2	-	2
Democratic Swarajya Party	2	-	-	2
Liberal Party	1	-	-	1
Independent Hindus	4	-	-	4
Independent Muslims	-	3	-	3
Unaligned	-	-	1	1
Total	20	5	1	26

=== MLCs elected ===
Reservation	Constituency	Member
Hindu	Ahmedabad cum Kaira	Dadabhai Purushottamdas Desai
Hindu	Ahmedabad cum Kaira	Chinubhai Lallubhai Mehta
Hindu	Bombay City cum Bombay Suburban Urban	Bahram Naoroji Karanjia
Hindu	Bombay City cum Bombay Suburban Urban	Ratilal Mulji Gandhi
Hindu	Bombay City cum Bombay Suburban Rural	Prof. Sohrab Davar
Hindu	Bombay City cum Bombay Suburban Rural	Hansa Jivraj Mehta
Hindu	Bharuch cum Panchmahal cum Surat	Mangaldas Pakvasa
Hindu	Bharuch cum Panchmahal cum Surat	Shantilal Harjivan Shah
Hindu	Dharwar cum Kannada	Narsinghrao Srinivasrao Desai
Hindu	Dharwar cum Kannada	Shubhrai Ramchandra Haldipur
Hindu	Kolaba cum Ratnagiri	Mahadeo Bajaji Virkar
Hindu	Kolaba cum Ratnagiri	Atmaram Mahadeo Atawane
Hindu	East Khandesh cum West Khandesh	Premraj Shaligram Marwari
Hindu	East Khandesh cum West Khandesh	Madhavrao Gopalrao Bhonsle
Hindu	Poona cum Satara	Dr. Ganesh Sakharam Mahajani
Hindu	Poona cum Satara	Ramchandra Ganesh Soman
Hindu	Sholapur cum Belgaum cum Bijapur	Chandrappa Baswantrao Desai
Hindu	Sholapur cum Belgaum cum Bijapur	Bheemji Balaji Poddar
Hindu	Thane cum Nashik cum Ahmednagar	Narayan Damodar Deodhekar
Hindu	Thane cum Nashik cum Ahmednagar	Ramchandra Ganesh Pradhan
Muslim	Bombay City cum Bombay Suburban	Baronet Ebrahim Currimbhoy
Muslim	Bombay City cum Bombay Suburban	Dr. K. A. Hamid
Muslim	Central Division	Khan Sahib Kadir Abdul Aziz Khan
Muslim	Northern Division	Khan Sahib Muhammad Ibrahim Makhan
Muslim	Southern Division	Muhammad Amin Wazir Muhammad Tambe
European		Frederick Stones
Nominated		Terence Martin D'Souza Guido
Nominated		S. C. Joshi
Nominated		Dr. Purushottambhai Solanki
Nominated		Major Sardar Bhimrao Nagojirao Patankar

== Government formation ==
Although the Indian National Congress won the elections, the party declined to form the government. The Governor Sir George Lloyd invited Sir Dhanjishah Cooper (independent member from Satara North constituency), to form an interim ministry. The Cooper ministry did not last long and a Congress ministry under B. G. Kher was sworn.
