= Second Kher ministry (Bombay Presidency) =

- Government of Bombay Presidency
- Date formed: 30 March 1946
- Date dissolved: 15 August 1947

People and organisations
- Governor: Sir John Colville
- Prime Minister: B. G. Kher
- Total no. of members: 18; 10 Cabinet ministers (Incl. Chief Minister); 8 Parliamentary secretaries
- Member parties: Congress
- Opposition party: AIML
- Opposition leader: A. A. Khan

History
- Election: 1946
- Legislature term: 5 years
- Predecessor: Kher I (1939)
- Successor: Kher (Bombay State)

B. G. Kher became the prime minister of Bombay Presidency for the second time on 3 April 1946. He had previously served in the office from 1937 to 1939. On account of Second World War, the premiership was vacant from 1939 to 1946. Kher continued till Indian Independence on 15 August 1947, after which, the office was abolished and Kher succeeded himself as the chief minister of Bombay State.

== List of ministers ==
The ministry consisted of 10 cabinet ministers and 8 parliamentary secretaries.

Portfolio	Minister	Took office	Left office	Party
Prime Minister; Political Service and Education	B. G. Kher	30 March 1946	15 August 1947	INC
Home and Revenue	Morarji Desai	30 March 1946	15 August 1947	INC
Health and Public Works	M. D. D. Gilder	30 March 1946	15 August 1947	INC
Excise and Reconstruction	L. M. Patil	30 March 1946	15 August 1947	INC
Law and Civil Supplies	Dinkarrao Desai	30 March 1946	15 August 1947	INC
Cooperation and Village Industries	Vaikunth L. Mehta	30 March 1946	15 August 1947	INC
Labour	Gulzarilal Nanda	30 March 1946	15 August 1947	INC
Forest and Agriculture	M. P. Patil	30 March 1946	15 August 1947	INC
Local Self-government	G. D. Vartak	30 March 1946	15 August 1947	INC
Industries, Fisheries, and Backward Classes	G. D. Tapase	30 March 1946	15 August 1947	INC

=== Parliamentary secretaries ===
- S. R. Kanthi
- B. D. Jatti
- K. F. Patil
- S. P. Gaonkar
- Indumathi Seth
- Yashwantrao Chavan
- D. K. Kunte
- D. N. Wandrekar
- P. K. Sawant
