= Dhanjishah Cooper =

Indian politician

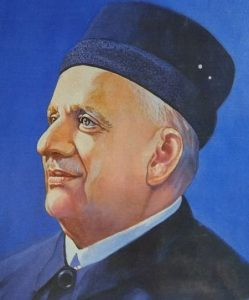

1st Prime Minister of Bombay State
- In office 1 April 1937 – 19 July 1937
- Governor: The Baron Brabourne
- Preceded by: Office Established
- Succeeded by: B. G. Kher

Personal details
- Born: Dhanjishah Bomanji Cooper; 2 January 1878 Bombay Presidency, India
- Died: 29 July 1947 (aged 69) Bombay, Bombay State, India
- Party: Independent
- Profession: Industrialist, Politician

Sir Dhanjishah Bomanji Cooper (2 January 1878 – 29 July 1947) was an Indian Parsi industrialist, politician and the first Prime Minister of Bombay Presidency. Cooper was made a Knight Bachelor in the 1937 New Year Honours.

== Early life ==
Dhanjishah Cooper was born in a poor Parsi Zoroastrian family to parents Bomanji and Firozabai Cooper. He finished his schooling in a government school in Satara. While working in a paper mill he started a contract business. He started manufacturing iron ploughs in 1922 at Satara and later became a pioneer of diesel engine manufacturing in India.

== Career ==
Cooper entered public life in 1912 and followed the policy of seeking British support for social reform, agricultural development and industrialisation. In 1920, he joined the Non-Brahmin Party under the leadership of Shahu of Kolhapur and led the party in Satara. Later due to differences among party leaders, he formed his own political group which came to be called as the 'Cooper Party' which mostly consisted of local elites.

As a politician, Cooper rose to prominence as a Satara municipality member, and became its president in 1923. Later he served on the Satara District Local Board, as its vice president (1922–1925) and president (1929–1932). Additionally, he chaired the Satara District School Board between 1925 and 1928. During this period, he made primary education compulsory in Satara Municipal area.

Cooper was also a member of the Bombay Legislative Council and served as minister for Local Self-Government from 1933 to 1934. He was appointed as a member of the Governor's Executive Council where he held the Finance and Revenue portfolios from 1935 to 1937.

In 1937 Bombay Presidency elections, he was elected to the Assembly from Satara North constituency. The Indian National Congress had secured the highest number of seats in the Assembly, but refused to form government. The Lord Brabourne invited Cooper to form a government. The Cooper ministry was short lived, and was soon replaced by B. G. Kher's first government.

== Personal life ==
Cooper was married to Gulabai and they had 5 daughters and one son. His only son Nariman died in 1944 and he never recovered from this loss. He died of heart attack at the age of 69 on 29 July 1947, at the Taj Mahal Hotel, Mumbai.

Preceded by Post created	Prime Minister of Bombay Province; 1 April 1937 – 19 July 1937	Succeeded by B. G. Kher
