= Colaba Fort Assembly constituency =

Constituency of the Bombay State legislative assembly

Colaba—Fort
- Former constituency for the State Legislative Assembly

Constituency details
- Country: India
- State: Bombay
- Lok Sabha constituency: Mumbai South
- Established: 1951
- Abolished: 1955
- Total electors: 51,160
- Reservation: None

Colaba—Fort was a constituency used for elections to the then Bombay State Legislative Assembly. It existed solely for the 1952 state election, and was not reserved.

== Members of the Legislative Assembly ==
Election	Member	Party
1952	Parikh Nathalal Dayabhai	Indian National Congress

== Boundary description ==
1951: A line starting from the Colaba point and running northwards along the harbour up to its junction with Ballard Road, thence westwards along the south side of Ballard Road up to its junction with Mint Road, thence northwards along the west side of Mint Road up to its junction with Agiary Lane, thence westwards along the south side of Agiary Lane up to its junction with Modi Street, thence northwards along the west side of Modi Street up to its junction with Fort Street, thence westwards along the south side of Fort Street up to its junction with Hornby Road, thence southwards along the east side of Hornby Road up to its junction with Veer Nariman Road (Church Gate Street), thence westwards along the south side of Veer Nariman Road (Church Gate Street) up to its junction with Netaji Subhas Road (Marine Drive) and Sea Wall, thence southwards along the Sea Wall covering the eastern portion up to the starting point, viz., the Colaba point.

== Election results ==
=== Assembly Election 1952 ===
1952 Bombay State Legislative Assembly election : Colaba—Fort
Party	Candidate	Votes	%	±%
INC	Parikh Nathalal Dayabhai	12,236	47.62%	New
Socialist	Sabawala Sharookh Ardeshir	9,077	35.33%	New
Independent	Balsara Pram Nusserwanji	3,498	13.61%	New
Independent	Advani Vasudo Hiranand	443	1.72%	New
RRP	Ladia Kirtikrishna Kedarnath	440	1.71%	New
Margin of victory		3,159	12.29%	
Turnout		25,694	50.22%	
Total valid votes		25,694		
Registered electors		51,160		
INC win (new seat)				
