= First Yashwantrao Chavan ministry (Bombay State) =

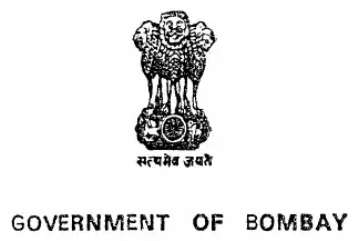
- 3 Ministry of Bombay State
- Date formed: 1 November 1956
- Date dissolved: 5 April 1957

People and organisations
- Governor: Sri Prakasa
- Chief Minister: Yashwantrao Chavan
- Total no. of members: 15 cabinet ministers
- Member parties: INC
- Status in legislature: Majority government

History
- Predecessor: Desai
- Successor: Y. Chavan II

Yashwantrao Chavan became the chief minister of the Bombay State on 1 November 1956. The first Chavan ministry served until 1957 Bombay Legislative Assembly election, and was succeeded by Chavan's second ministry.

== Ministry ==
The ministry consisted of 15 cabinet ministers.

| Portfolio | Minister | Took office | Left office | Party |
|---|---|---|---|---|
| Chief Minister; Political and Services Department; Home Affairs; Planning; Departments not allocated to any minister | Yashwantrao Chavan | 1 November 1956 | 5 April 1957 | INC |
| Finance | Jivraj Mehta | 1 November 1956 | 5 April 1957 | INC |
| Revenue | Rasiklal Umedchand Parikh | 1 November 1956 | 5 April 1957 | INC |
| Public Works | Malojirao Naik Nimbalkar | 1 November 1956 | 5 April 1957 | INC |
| Fisheries; Local Self-government | G. D. Tapase | 1 November 1956 | 5 April 1957 | INC |
| Education; Law | Shantilal Shah | 1 November 1956 | 5 April 1957 | INC |
| Public Health | Marotrao Kannamwar | 1 November 1956 | 5 April 1957 | INC |
| Labour | Deendayal Gupta | 1 November 1956 | 5 April 1957 | INC |
| Prohibition; Village Panchayats; Cottage Industries | Ratubhai Adani | 1 November 1956 | 5 April 1957 | INC |
| Social Welfare; Rehabilitation | Indumati Chimanlal Sheth | 1 November 1956 | 5 April 1957 | INC |
| Development; Planning; Electricity; Housing | Babubhai J. Patel | 1 November 1956 | 5 April 1957 | INC |
| Agriculture | Mustafa Faki | 1 November 1956 | 5 April 1957 | INC |
| Cooperation | Vasantrao Naik | 1 November 1956 | 5 April 1957 | INC |
| Forests | Bhagwantrao Gadhe | 1 November 1956 | 5 April 1957 | INC |
| Civil Supplies; Industries; Printing Presses | Vinayak Sathe | 1 November 1956 | 5 April 1957 | INC |
