= Kher ministry (Bombay State) =

B. G. Kher was the first Chief Minister of Bombay State. He had been the Prime Minister of the Bombay Presidency since 1946. The Presidency, on India's independence on 15 August 1947 became the Bombay State. Kher served until 1952 Bombay legislative elections. His government was succeeded by that of Morarji Desai.

== List of ministers ==
Portfolio	Minister	Took office	Left office	Party
Chief Minister	B. G. Kher	15 August 1947	21 April 1952	INC
Home; Revenue	Morarji Desai	15 August 1947	21 April 1952	INC
Labour; Housing	Gulzarilal Nanda	15 August 1947	1950	INC

=== Parliamentary secretaries ===
- Yashwantrao Chavan
