= Bhavanji Arjan Khimji =

Indian politician

Bhavanji Arjun Khimji

Member of Parliament
- In office 1952-1957; 1957-1962
- Constituency: Kachchh (Lok Sabha constituency)

Member of Bombay Legislative Assembly
- In office 1937-1951

Personal details
- Born: 28 July 1902 Khamgaon, Central Provinces and Berar
- Died: 1970 (aged 67–68)
- Party: Indian National Congress
- Spouse: Ashbai

Bhavanji Arjun Khimji, JP (28 July 1902 - 1970) was member of Indian National Congress, who served as a Member of Parliament twice from Kachchh Lok Sabha constituency. He was a member of Bombay Legislative Assembly from 1937 to 1951. Khimji also served as treasurer of All India Congress Committee. He was jailed for taking part in the freedom struggle in India from 1931–32, 1940–41 and 1942-44. He was born in Khamgaon in a Jain family and inherited family run Khimji Ginning & Pressing Company, which was located in Khamgaon.
