= Siddappa Kambli =

Indian politician

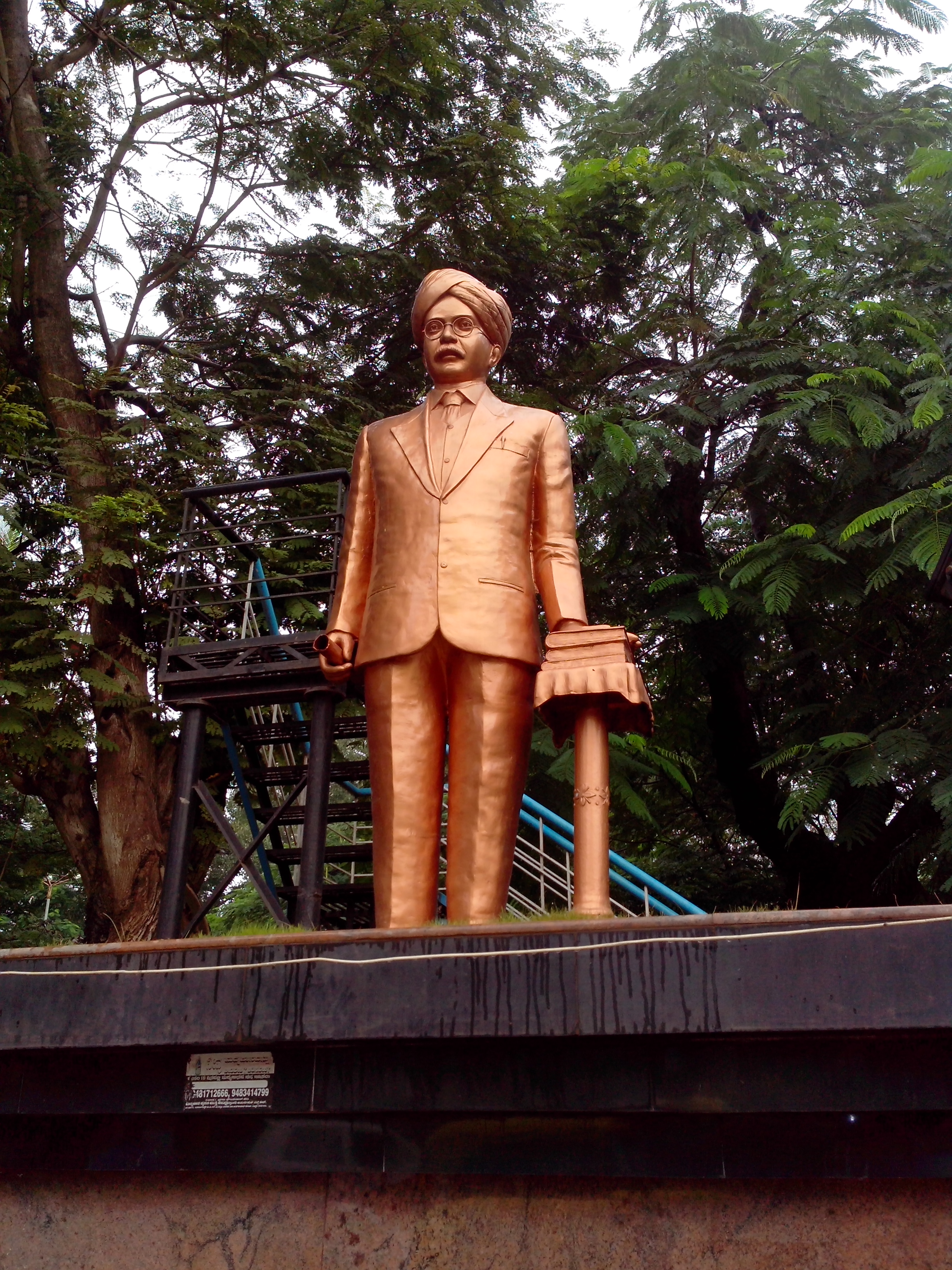
Sir Siddappa Kambali Statue, next to Hubli-Dharawada Municipal Corporation, Hubli

Sir Siddappa Totappa Kambli (1882-1956) was an Indian politician from Hubli in modern Karnataka.

== Biography ==
During the British colonial period, Kambli was a member of the Bombay Legislative Council, where he was elected as its Deputy President. Under the system of diarchy, he served as a minister of agriculture from 1930 to 1934 and minister of education from 1932 to 1937.

After the provincial elections of 1937, a government was formed under Dhanjishah Cooper where Kambli was made minister for Education, Excise & Agriculture. As a minister of education, Kambli was responsible for the establishment of Karnatak University in Dharwad.

After independence of India, Kambli joined the Kisan Mazdoor Praja Party. He also played a role in the unification of Karnataka. He died in 1956.
