= Bombay Legislative Assembly =

Historical state legislature in India

Bombay Legislative Assembly came into existence in 1937, as the legislature of Bombay Presidency, a province of India. It functioned until 1960, when separate states of Maharashtra and Gujarat were formed.

== History ==
The first session of this assembly was held on 19 July 1937 in Pune's Council Hall. The first session of the upper house, the legislative council was held a day later on 20 July 1937.

Bombay Presidency was a province, which in 1937, included Bombay State, Rewa Kantha Agency, Mahi Kantha Agency, Western India States Agency, Sindh province and Aden. Aden was detached in 1937 to be made a separate Colony of Aden in order to be kept out of jurisdiction of Bombay Presidency.

Elections were held in 1937 in Bombay State for the legislative assembly. Further, Sindh was made a separate province, detached from the Bombay Presidency in 1936 and Legislative Assembly of Sind was made a separate assembly for Sind Province of British India. After the Government of India Act 1935 was passed which envisaged a federal type of government; elections were held in 1937 to form provincial governments. The Assembly at that time had a total strength of 175 members.

Balasaheb Gangadhar Kher became the Premier of the Bombay Presidency. But later in 1939, as part of the freedom movement, all Congress ministries in British Indian provinces resigned and Bombay was placed under Governor's rule. In 1946 that elections were once again held. This time too, Congress won and formed the government under Balasaheb Kher, who continued as Chief Minister even after India's independence until 1952. Party wise break up of seats in the Bombay Legislative Assembly: From 1937 to 1942, B. R. Ambedkar served as the Leader of the Opposition in the Bombay Legislative Assembly.

== Seats held by different political parties in 1937 ==
Total Number of Seats : 175

Party	Seats
Indian National Congress	88
Independents	32
Muslim League	20
Independent Labour Party	11
Europeans, Anglo-Indians and Indian Christians	8
Non-Brahman	8
Democratic Swarajya Party	5
Peasants Party	2
Total	175
Source: Schwartzberg Atlas

== After independence ==
After Indian independence in 1947, the Bombay Legislative Assembly elected in 1946 continued to work as a part of India's Bombay State, until in the 1951 elections.

Later elections to Bombay Legislative Assembly were held in 1957.

Bombay Legislative Assembly ceased to exist when in 1960, when the States of Maharashtra and Gujarat came into existence and Legislative Assembly of Maharashtra and Legislative Assembly of Gujarat were formed and Bombay Legislative Assembly was dissolved.

== See also ==
- Bombay Legislative Council
- Maharashtra Legislative Assembly
- Gujarat Legislative Assembly
