= T. E. Moir =

Indian civil servant of British origin

Sir Thomas Eyebron Moir KCIE CSI (1874–1932) was an Indian civil servant of British origin. He served as the Revenue member of the executive council of the Governor of Madras from 1925 to 1930.

== Early life and education ==
Moir was educated at Fettes College, Edinburgh and Wadham College, Oxford. He took the 1897 Indian civil service examinations and having passed, arrived in India on 26 December 1898.

== Career ==
Moir joined the Indian civil service and served in Madras as Assistant Collector and Magistrate from 1898 to 1901 and Assistant Settlement Officer from 1901 to 1904. He served as Deputy Secretary in the Madras Government from 1910 to 1913 and was Acting Collector in 1914. From 1915 to 1918, he served as Private Secretary to the Governor of Madras.

Moir was nominated to the Madras Legislative Council in which he served from 1922 to 1925. In 1925, Lord Goschen appointed him as the revenue member of the executive council of the Governor of Madras and he served in the council from 1925 to 1930.

== Personal life ==
Moir married Isabella Thurnburn Davies in 1900. The couple had one son.

== Honours ==
Moir was made a Companion of the Order of the Indian Empire in 1917 and a Companion of the Order of the Star of India in 1922. He was made a Knight Commander of the Order of the Indian Empire in 1929.
