= Anna Babaji Latthe =

Indian politician

Anna Babaji Latthe (9 December 1878 – 16 May 1950) or Annasaheb Latthe was an Indian politician, social reformer, educationist and leader of the Satyashodhak Samaj and Non-Brahmin movement.

== Early life ==
Annasaheb was born on 9 December 1878 in a Jain family. He was the fifth child of Babaji Latthe, who was in the service of the Patwardhans at Kurundwad and later had his own business of selling foodgrains and cotton. Annasaheb completed his middle school education from Kurundwad and high school from Miraj. He graduated from Rajaram College, Kolhapur in 1898 and further obtained a B.A. Degree from the Deccan College in Poona in 1901. He obtained his M.A. Degree in English from the University of Bombay in 1903. Annasaheb married ten year old Dnyanamati in 1899. She was uneducated but Annasaheb taught her reading and writing after marriage. Dnyanmati died in 1913 after which Annasaheb married Jotsnabai with whom he had had eight children.

== Career ==
Annasaheb Latthe attended the first conference of the Dakshin Bharat Jain Sabha while studying in Poona and had suggested its name. He started his career as a Lecturer of English in Rajaram College in 1907 and later as Education Inspector of Kolhapur State.

Inspired by the teachings of Jyotirao Phule, Latthe in cooperation with Bhaskarrao Jadhav launched a movement of social awakening of the masses under the Satyashodhak Samaj.

Latthe was elected to the Central Legislative Assembly in 1920 from the Bombay Southern Rural constituency with the support of Shahu of Kolhapur. He represented the Deccan Non-Brahmin League and in the assembly became a member of the Democratic Party.

In 1923, Latthe unsuccessfully contested elections to the Bombay Legislative Council as Non-Brahmin Party candidate. In 1924, he organised the first conference of the Non-Brahmin Party under the presidentship of Arcot Ramasamy Mudaliar. In the same year he wrote the official biography of Shahu Maharaj of Kolhapur.

Latthe was appointed as the advisor of Chhatrapati Rajaram III of Kolhapur State in 1925. After the retirement of Dewan Raghunathrao Sabnis, he was appointed as Dewan of Kolhapur. He was nominated by the Chamber of Princes Special Organisation to attend the Round Table Conference. He resigned as the Dewan in 1931 and settled in Belgaum where was elected to the District School Board, District Local Board, and then to the Belgaum Municipality.

In 1936, Latthe joined the Indian National Congress returning all honours and titles conferred on him by the British Government. In the 1937 Bombay Presidency election, he was elected to the Bombay Legislative Council from the Belgaum North constituency. He was appointed as the finance minister in the First Kher ministry.

He was arrested in August 1942 for participating in the Quit India Movement and was placed in Hindalaga Jail for 8 days. He was again elected to the Bombay Legislative Council in 1946 but was not appointed to the ministry. He resigned from the council and was appointed as constitutional adviser to Shahaji II of Kolhapur in June 1947. He resisted the merger of Kolhapur State with the Indian Union for which he was ordered to leave Kolhapur and Shahaji II signed the document of merger

Annasaheb Latthe died of heart failure on 16 May 1950.
