= Democratic Swarajya Party =

Political party in British India

The Democratic Swarajya Party was a political party in British India. It was founded in the Bombay Province in October 1933 with the aim of attaining Purna Swaraj (Total Independence) through constitutional means.

The first Democratic Swarajya Party was established by Bal Gangadhar Tilak in 1920 within the Indian National Congress. After his death, his supporters such as N. C. Kelkar, M. R. Jayakar, Ramrao Deshmukh, Bhaskar Balwant Bhopatkar, Jamnadas Mehta, Rambhau Mandlik and Karandikar became members of the Swaraj Party within the Congress and contested elections for the legislative councils. Since the Congress boycotted the councils following the civil disobedience movement, old-Tilakites were dissatisfied and decided to contest the elections and enter the councils. Therefore, Kelkar, along with B. S. Moonje, Madhav Shrihari Aney and Jamnadas Mehta revived the Democratic Swarajya Party on 29 October 1933 in Bombay.
