= Ali Muhammad Khan Dehlavi =

Sir Ali Muhammad Khan Dehlavi (1875 – April 14, 1952) was an Indian politician, educationist, Muslim reformist and a leader in the Pakistan Movement and a Muslim reformist.

== Early life ==
Dehlavi was born in 1875 in Mumbai, to Khan Bahadur Khan. Dehlavi himself had six sons and one daughter. Saadullah Khan Dehlavi, Samiullah Khan Dehlavi, Asadullah Khan Dehlavi, Habibullah Khan Dehlavi, Sikandaruallh Khan Dehlavi, Zareena Khanum Dehlavi and Sultan Ahmed Khan Dehlavi. Samiullah Khan Dehlavi, later rose up to become Ambassador of Pakistan to several countries and the Foreign Minister of Pakistan.

Although he spent most of his life in Bombay, Dehlavi also went to London for higher education during his early adulthood. He returned to India from Britain in 1896, to set up a law firm in Gujarat, Punjab. In 1900 he moved his practice to Hyderabad, Sind, and continued it for the next eight years.

== Educational work ==
Dehlavi started various literary publications, including an Anglo-Indian publication called "Al-Haq", which was intended to uplift and highlight the problems faced by the farmers and land owners of Sind. He remained its editor for several years. In 1902 he organised a Muslim Educational Conference in Hyderabad, for reasons pertaining to the falling standards of education of Muslims of India, and served as the Secretary of Education of the All India Muslim League. He presided over the 10th Residency Presidential Educational Conference.

== Political life ==
Dehlavi started his political career participating in the 1906 session of the All India Muslim League, and in December 1906 was included in the divisional committee of the Muslim League. He also had ties with Muhammad Ali Jinnah which were according to some scholars, later disturbed near the establishment of Pakistan in 1947. In 1907 he served as one of the chief organisers of the All India Muslim League meeting in Karachi. He stated in that session that if the Muslim League were to continue its operations in a hard working manner and according to the constitution, it would undoubtedly become a formidable political force. In the 1908 session at Aligarh he was selected as a member of the central committee, and in the same year was appointed Diwan for the state of Mangrol, a title he held until 1916. From 1924 to 1927 he served as a member of the Bombay Legislative Council, sitting as the minister for excise, forests and registration. In 1927, he was re-elected into the Bombay Legislative Council as President. He was then again re-elected as a member of the Legislative Council and remained there until 1937. He served as the minister for local self-government from 1936 to 1937.

After the Government of India Act 1935 came into force, provincial elections were held in 1937, and Dehlavi was elected as a member of the Legislative Assembly. The same year, he was elected as the party leader of the Muslim League in his province and served as leader of opposition until 1946. Dehlavi retired from politics in 1946, dying a few years later.
