= Bombay Presidency =

Province in India (1668–1947)

Presidency of Bombay 1662–1937 Province of Bombay 1937–1950
- 1662–1950
- Flag Badge
- Anthem: "God Save the King/Queen"
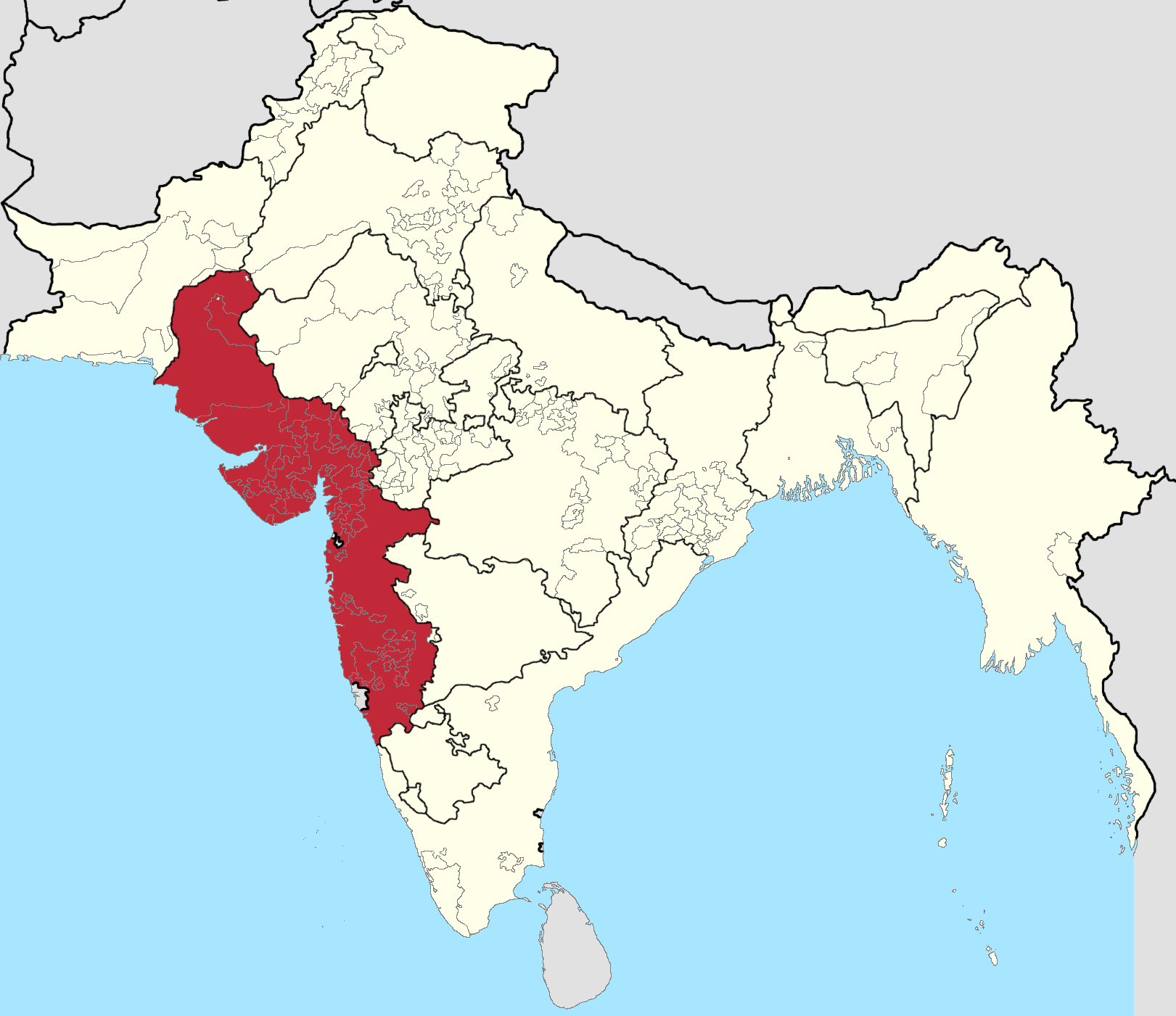
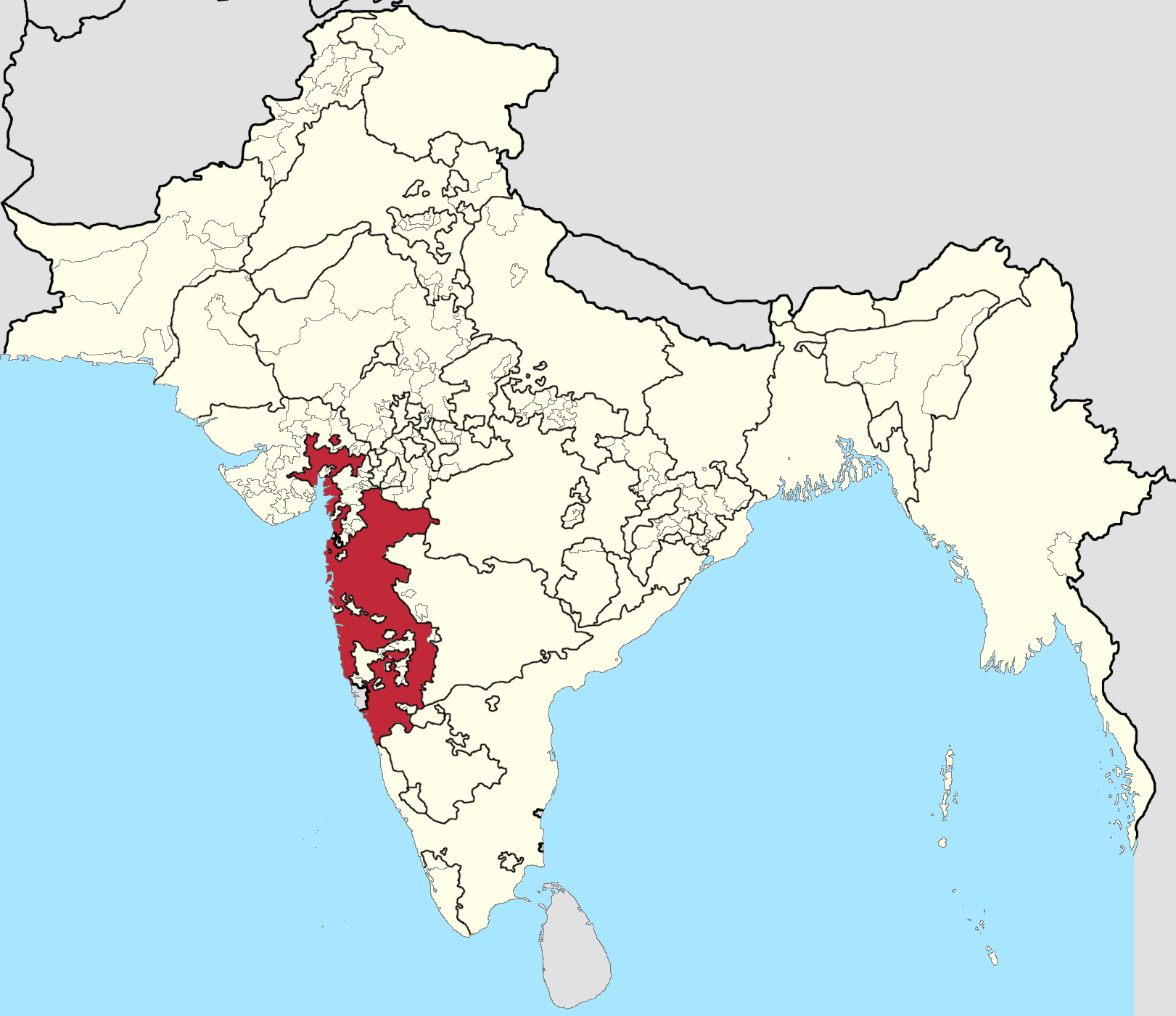

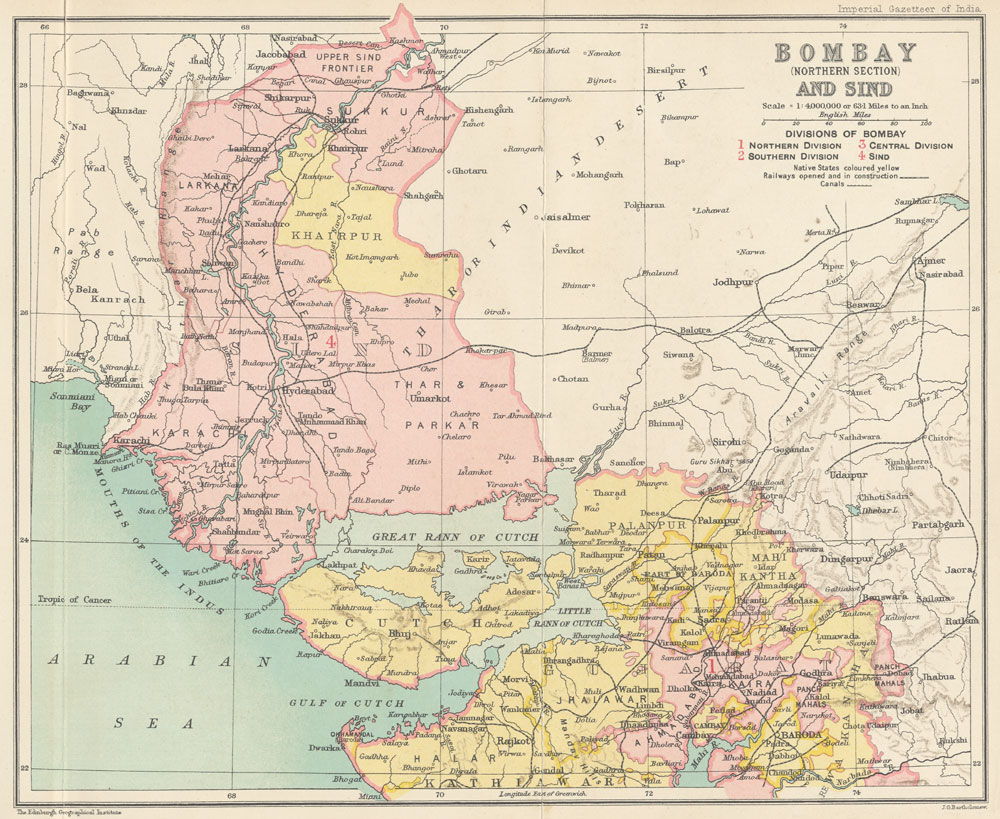
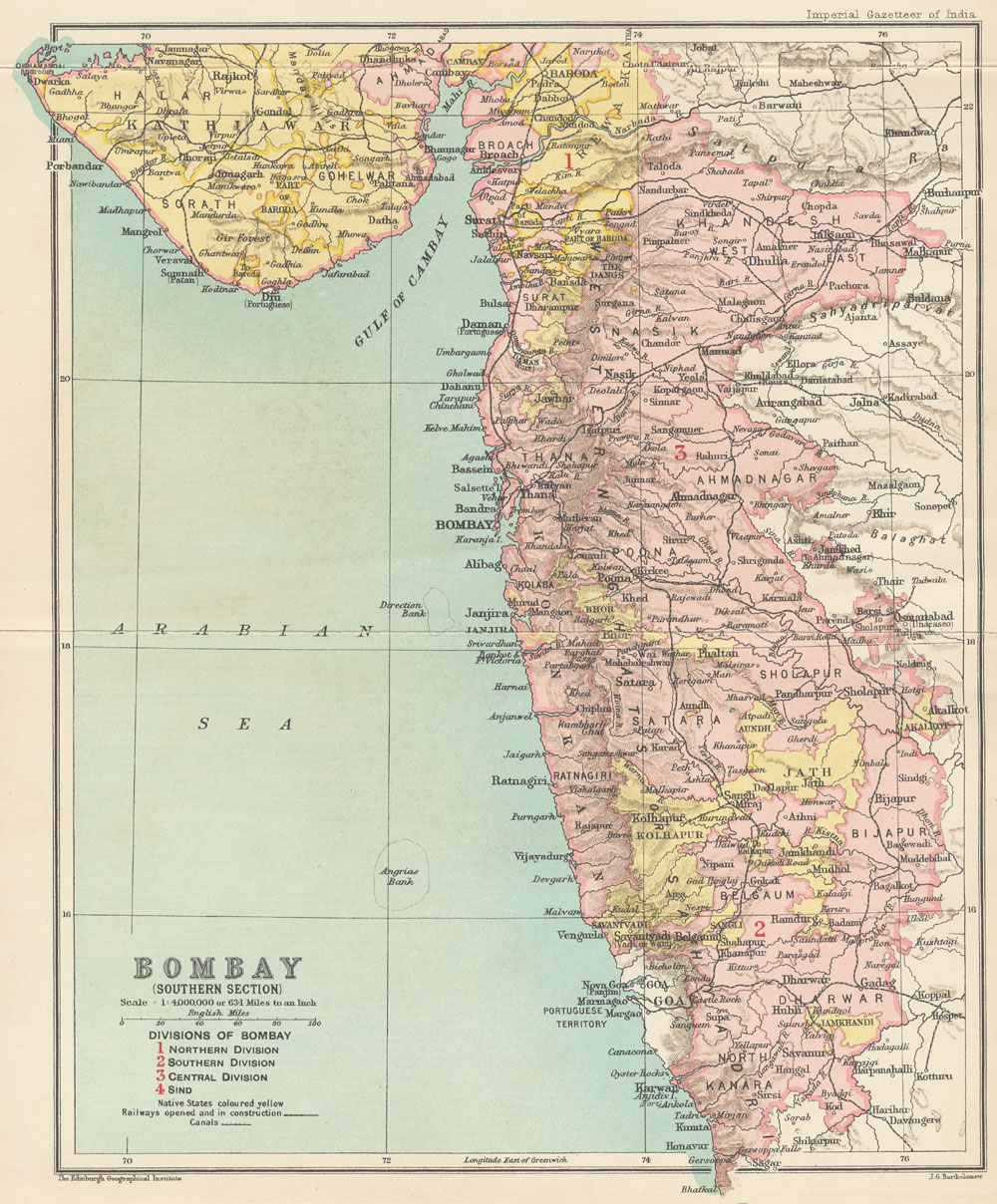
- Northern and southern sections of the Bombay Presidency in 1909
- Capital: Bombay
- Official languages: English; Hindustani; Persian(till 1843)
- Recognised regional languages: Marathi; Gujarati; Sindhi; Canarese; Arabic
- Governor
  - 1662–1664 (first): Abraham Shipman
  - 1943–1947 (last): Sir John Colville
- Premier
  - 1937–1939 (first): B. G. Kher
  - 1939–1946: Governor's rule
  - 1946–1950 (last): B. G. Kher
- Historical era: New Imperialism
  - Ceded by the Portuguese: 1662
  - Regulating Act 1773: 1773
  - Government of India Act 1858: 1858
  - Scindia ceded Panchmahal to British: 1861
  - North Canara transferred from Madras: 1862
  - Separation of Aden: 1932
  - Separation of Sind: 1936
  - Independence of India: 1947
  - Bombay Province becomes Bombay State: 1950
Preceded by
Portuguese India
Maratha Empire
Sind State
Sultanate of Lahej
Succeeded by
Bombay State
Sind Province (1936–55)
Aden Colony
- This article incorporates text from a publication now in the public domain: Chisholm, Hugh, ed. (1911). "Bombay Presidency". Encyclopædia Britannica (11th ed.). Cambridge University Press.

The Bombay Presidency, officially called the Presidency of Bombay until 1937, later the Bombay Province, also called Bombay and Sind (1843–1936), was an administrative subdivision (province) of Company Raj and later, British Raj, with its capital in the Bombay (modern-day Mumbai) that came up over the seven islands of Bombay. The first mainland territory was acquired in the Konkan region with the Treaty of Bassein. Poona was the summer capital.

The Bombay Presidency has its beginnings in the city of Bombay that was leased in fee tail to the East India Company, via the Royal Charter of 27 March 1668 by King Charles II of England, who had in turn acquired Bombay on 11 May 1661, through the dowry by way of his marriage treaty with princess Catherine De Braganza, daughter of John IV of Portugal. The English East India Company transferred its Western India headquarters from Surat in the Gulf of Cambay after it was sacked, to the relatively safe Bombay Harbour in 1687. The province was brought under direct rule along with other parts of British Raj through Pitt's India Act, after the nationalisation of the East India Company. Major territorial acquisitions were made by the company after Anglo-Maratha Wars when the whole of the Peshwa's dominions and much of the Gaekwad's sphere of influence were annexed to the Bombay Presidency in stages up until 1818. Aden including Socotra were placed under Bombay in 1839, Sind was annexed by the company in 1843 after defeating the Talpur dynasty in the Battle of Hyderabad.

At its greatest extent, the Bombay Province comprised the present-day state of Gujarat, the western two-thirds of Maharashtra state, including the divisions of Konkan, Desh & Kandesh, and also the northwestern region of Karnataka; it also included Pakistan's Sindh Province (1847–1935) and Aden of present-day Yemen (1839–1932). The districts and provinces of the presidency were directly under British rule, while the internal administration of the native or princely states was in the hands of local rulers. The presidency, however, managed the defence of princely states and British relations with them through political agencies. The Bombay Presidency along with the Bengal Presidency and Madras Presidency were the three major centres of British power in South Asia.

== Origins ==
=== Early history ===
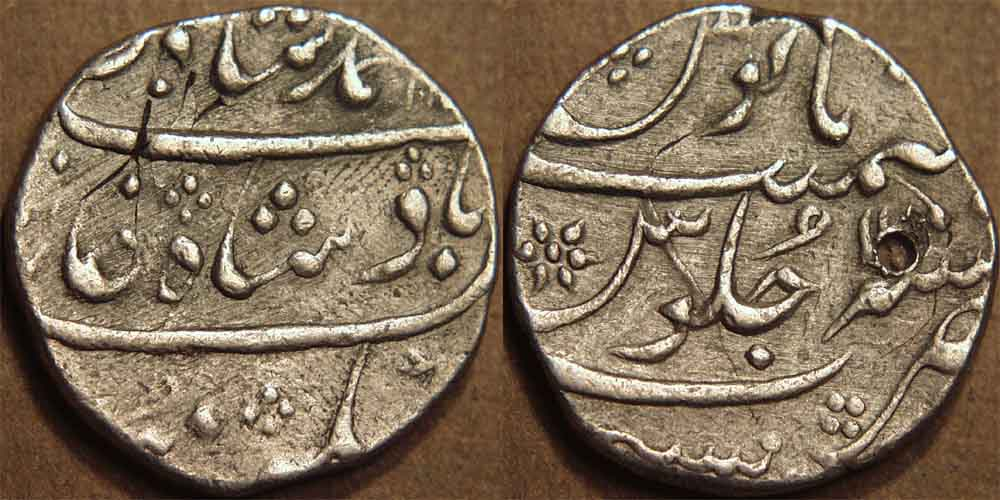
Silver rupee of the Bombay Presidency, in the name of the Mughal emperor Muhammad Shah (ruled 1719–48), minted at Bombay in c. 1731. Most of the gold and silver coinages of the Presidencies were in the Mughal style.

The first English settlement in the Presidency known as Western Presidency was begun in 1618 at Surat in present-day Gujarat, when the East India Company established a factory, protected by a charter obtained from the Mughal emperor Jahangir. In 1626 the Dutch and the English made an unsuccessful attempt to gain possession of the island of Bombay in the coastal Konkan region from Portugal, and in 1653 proposals were suggested for its purchase from the Portuguese. In 1661 Bombay was ceded to the Kingdom of England as part of the dowry of the infanta Catherine of Braganza on her marriage to King Charles II. So lightly was the acquisition esteemed in England, and so unsuccessful was the administration of the crown officers, that in 1668 Bombay was transferred to the East India Company for an annual payment of £10, and the company established a factory there. At the time of the transfer, powers for the island's defence and for the administration of justice were also conferred on the company; a European regiment^{1} was enrolled; and fortifications were erected which in 1673 proved sufficient to deter the Dutch from an intended attack. As English trade in Bombay increased, Surat (which had been sacked by Shivaji in 1670) began its relative decline. In 1687, Bombay was made the headquarters of all the East India Company's possessions in India. However, in 1753 the governor of Bombay became subordinate to that of Calcutta.

=== Territorial expansion ===
During the 18th century, the Maratha Empire expanded rapidly, claiming Konkan and much of eastern Gujarat from the disintegrating Mughal Empire. In western Gujarat, including Kathiawar and Kutch, the loosening of Mughal control allowed numerous local rulers to create virtually independent states. The first conflict between the British and the Marathas was the First Anglo-Maratha War which began in 1774 and resulted in the 1782 Treaty of Salbai, by which the island of Salsette, adjacent to Bombay island, was ceded to the British, while Bharuch was ceded to the Maratha ruler Scindia. The British annexed Surat in 1800. British territory was enlarged in the Second Anglo-Maratha War which ended in 1803. The East India Company received the districts of Bharuch, Kaira, etc., and the Maratha Gaekwad rulers of Baroda acknowledged British sovereignty.

== History ==
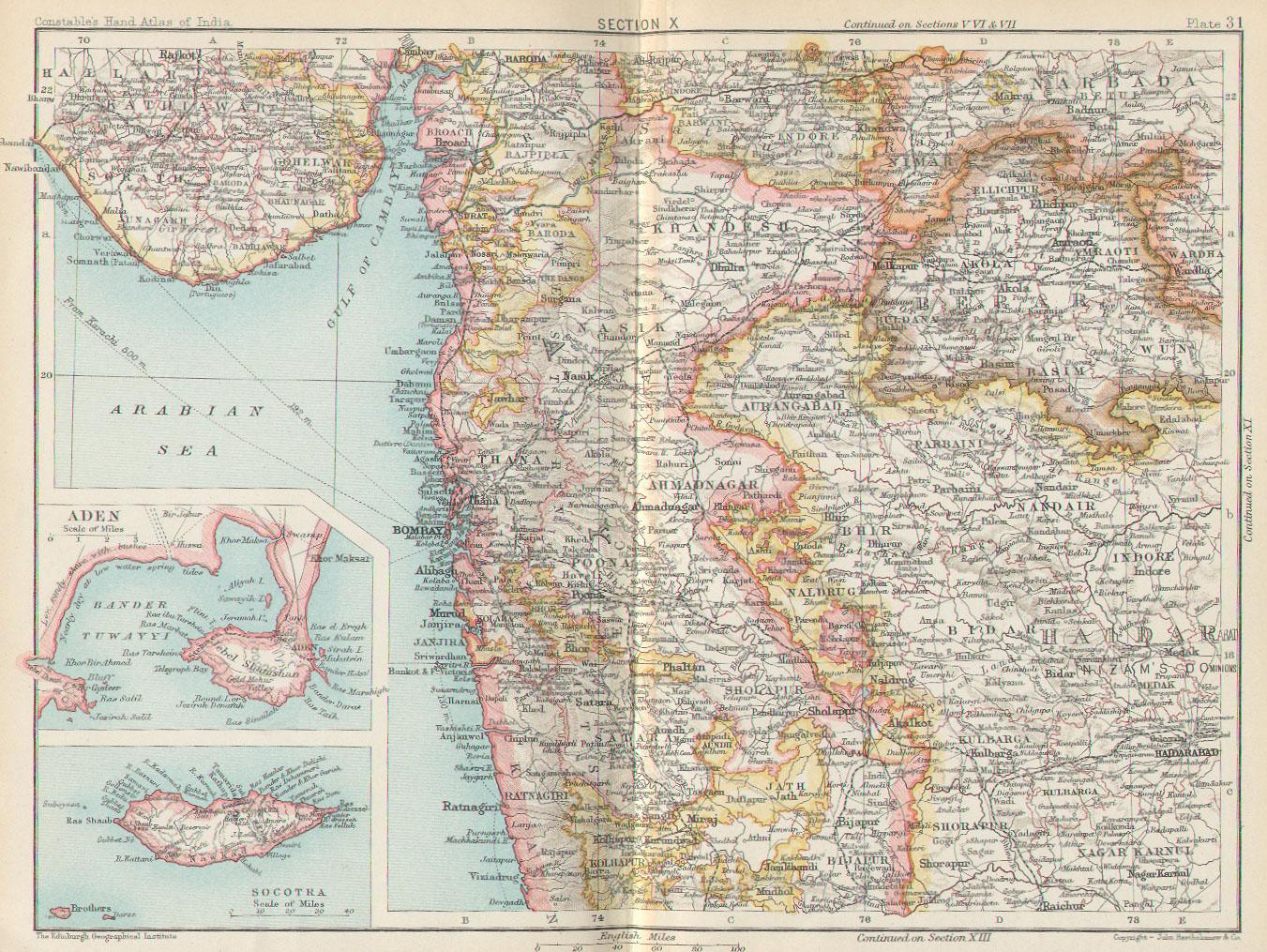
1893 map of the Bombay Presidency including Aden Province and Socotra.

=== Expansion ===
In 1803, the Bombay Presidency included only Salsette, the islands of the harbour (since 1774), Surat and Bankot (since 1756); but between this date and 1827 the framework of the presidency took shape. The Gujarat districts were taken over by the Bombay government in 1805 and enlarged in 1818. Baji Rao II, the last of the peshwas, who had attempted to shake off the British yoke, was defeated in the Battle of Khadki, captured subsequently and pensioned (1817/1818), and large portions of his dominions (Pune, Ahmednagar, Nasik, Solapur, Belgaum, Kaladgi, Dharwad, etc.) were included in the Presidency, the settlement of which was completed by Mountstuart Elphinstone, governor from 1819 to 1827. His policy was to rule as far as possible on native lines, avoiding all changes for which the population was not yet ripe; but the grosser abuses of the old regime were stopped, the country was pacified, the laws were codified, and courts and schools were established.

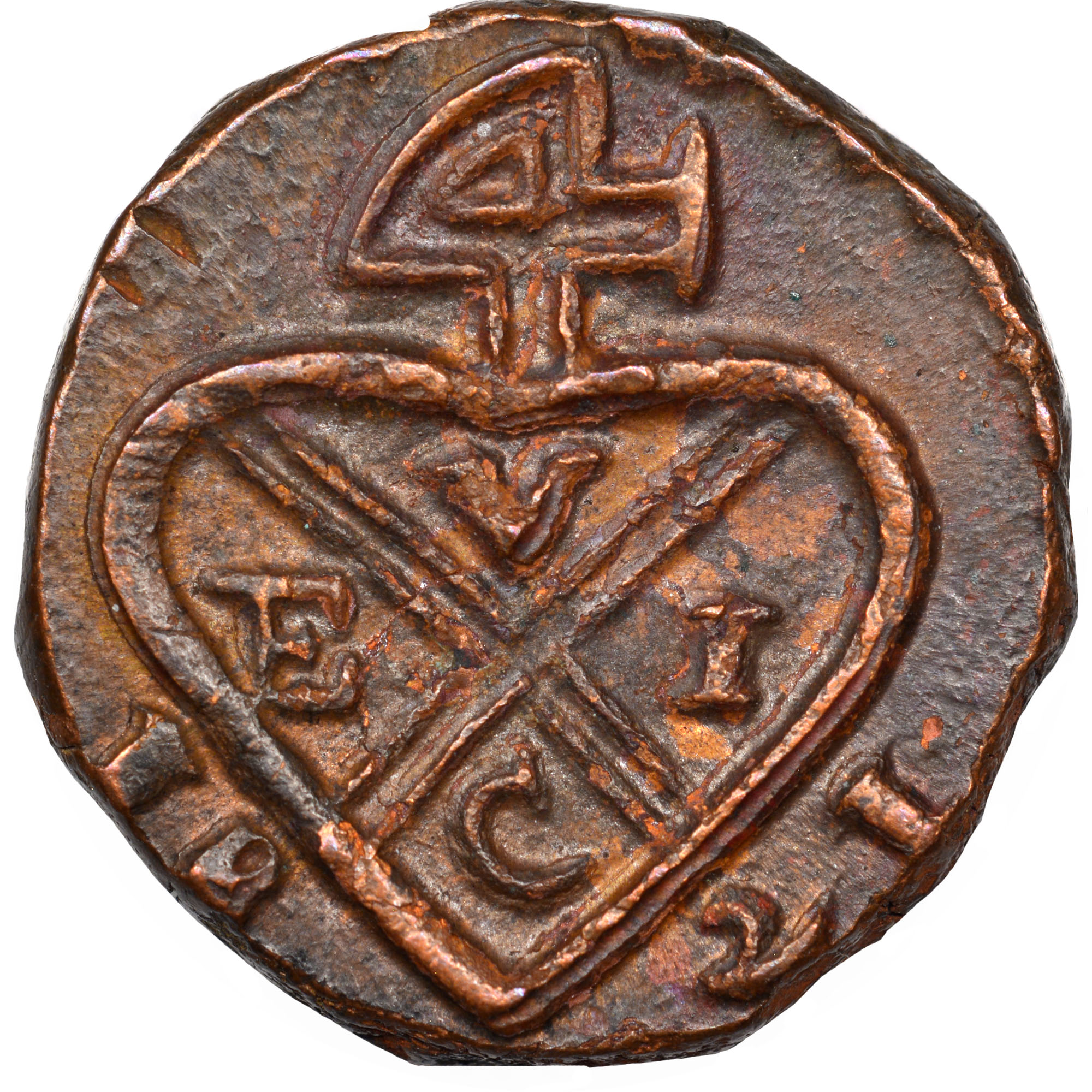
1 Pice (1/64 Rupee) copper coin of the Bombay Presidency from 1821, with the United East India Company bale mark.

The period that followed is notable mainly for the enlargement of the Presidency through the lapse of certain native states, by the addition of Aden (1839) and Sindh (1843), and the lease of the Panch Mahals from Scindia (1853). In 1862, North Canara was transferred from Madras Presidency to Bombay while South Canara remained with Madras.

=== Victorian era ===
In 1859, under the terms of the Queen's Proclamation issued by Queen Victoria, the Bombay Presidency, along with the rest of British India, came under the direct rule of the British Crown.

Henry Bartle Frere (1862–1867) was the first Governor appointed by the Crown. The Governor's Council was reformed and expanded under the Indian Councils Act 1861, the Indian Councils Act 1892, the Indian Councils Act 1909, the Government of India Act 1919 and the Government of India Act 1935.

The establishment of an orderly administration, one outcome of which was a general fall of prices that made the unusual regularity of the collection of taxes doubly unwelcome, naturally excited a certain amount of misgiving and resentment; but on the whole the population was prosperous and contented, and under Lord Elphinstone (1853–1860) the presidency passed through the crisis of the Revolt of 1857 without any general rising. Outbreaks among the troops at Karachi, Ahmedabad and Kolhapur were quickly put down, two regiments being disbanded, and the rebellions in Gujarat, among the Bhils, and in the southern Maratha country were local and isolated. Under Sir Bartle Frere agricultural prosperity reached its highest point, as a result of the American Civil War and the consequent enormous demand for Indian cotton in Europe. The money thus poured into the country produced an epidemic of speculation known as the Share Mania (1864–1865), which ended in a commercial crisis and the failure of the Bank of Bombay (1866). But the peasantry gained on the whole more than they lost, and the trade of Bombay was not permanently injured. Sir Bartle Frere encouraged the completion of the great trunk lines of railways, and with the funds obtained by the demolition of the town walls (1862) he began the magnificent series of public buildings that now adorn Bombay (Mumbai).

During this period, parts of Bombay presidency were devastated by two great famines: Great Famine of 1876–78 and the Indian famine of 1896–97.

=== Dyarchy (1920–37) ===
British India's Montagu–Chelmsford Reforms of 1919, enacted in 1921, expanded the Legislative Council to include more elected Indian members, and introduced the principle of dyarchy, whereby certain responsibilities, including agriculture, health, education, and local government, were transferred to elected ministers. However, the important portfolios like finance, police and irrigation were reserved with members of the Governor's Executive Council. Some of the prominent Indian members of the Executive Council were Chimanlal Harilal Setalvad, R. P. Paranjpye, Ghulam Hussain Hidayatullah, Ali Muhammad Khan Dehlavi, Rafiuddin Ahmed, Siddappa Totappa Kambli, Shah Nawaz Bhutto and Sir Cowasji Jehangir.

In 1932, Aden was separated from Bombay and made a separate province, and Sindh became a separate province on 1 April 1936.

=== Provincial Autonomy ===
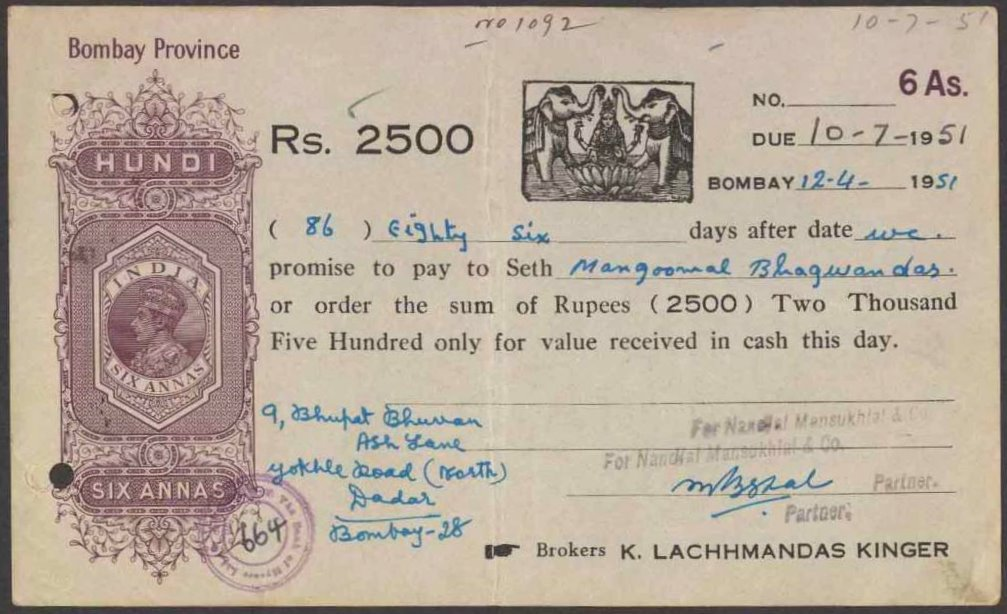
A 1951 hundi from Bombay

The Government of India Act 1935 made the Bombay Presidency into a regular province, and made Sind a separate province, with relations with the princely state of Khairpur managed by Sindh. It enlarged the elected provincial legislature and expanded provincial autonomy vis a vis the central government. In the 1937 elections, the Indian National Congress won the elections in Bombay but declined to form the government. The Governor Sir George Lloyd invited Sir Dhanjishah Cooper, to form an interim ministry which was joined by Jamnadas Mehta of the Lokashahi Swarajya Paksha (Democratic Swarajya Party), Sir Siddappa Kambli of the Non-Brahmin Party and Hoosenally Rahimtoola of the Muslim League.

Minister	Portfolio
Dhanjishah Cooper	Chief Minister, Home & General
Jamnadas Mehta	Revenue & Finance
Sir Siddappa Kambli	Education, Excise & Agriculture
Hoosenaly Rahimtoola	Local Self-government

The Cooper ministry did not last long and a Congress ministry under B. G. Kher was sworn in.

Council of Ministers in Kher's Cabinet:

Minister	Portfolio
B. G. Kher	Premier, Political & Services, Education and Labour
K. M. Munshi	Home & Legal
Anna Babaji Latthe	Finance
Morarji Desai	Revenue, Agriculture, Forests and Cooperatives
Manchersha Dhanjibhoy Gilder	Public Health and Excise
Mahmad Yasin Nurie	Public Works
Laxman Madhav Patil	Industries and Local Self-Government

In 1939, all of the Congress ministries in the British Indian provinces resigned and Bombay was placed under the Governor's rule.

=== Last days of British rule ===
After the end of World War II, the Indian National Congress re-entered politics and won the 1946 election under the leadership of Kher who was again elected as Chief Minister. The Bombay Presidency became Bombay State when India was granted independence on 15 August 1947 and Kher continued as the Chief Minister of the state, serving until 1952.

=== After independence ===
In 1947, Bombay Province became part of the Dominion of India. When provinces were replaced with states when the Constitution of India came into force on 26 January 1950, the day India became the first republic in the Commonwealth of Nations, Bombay Province became Bombay State, a Part-A state.

== Geography ==
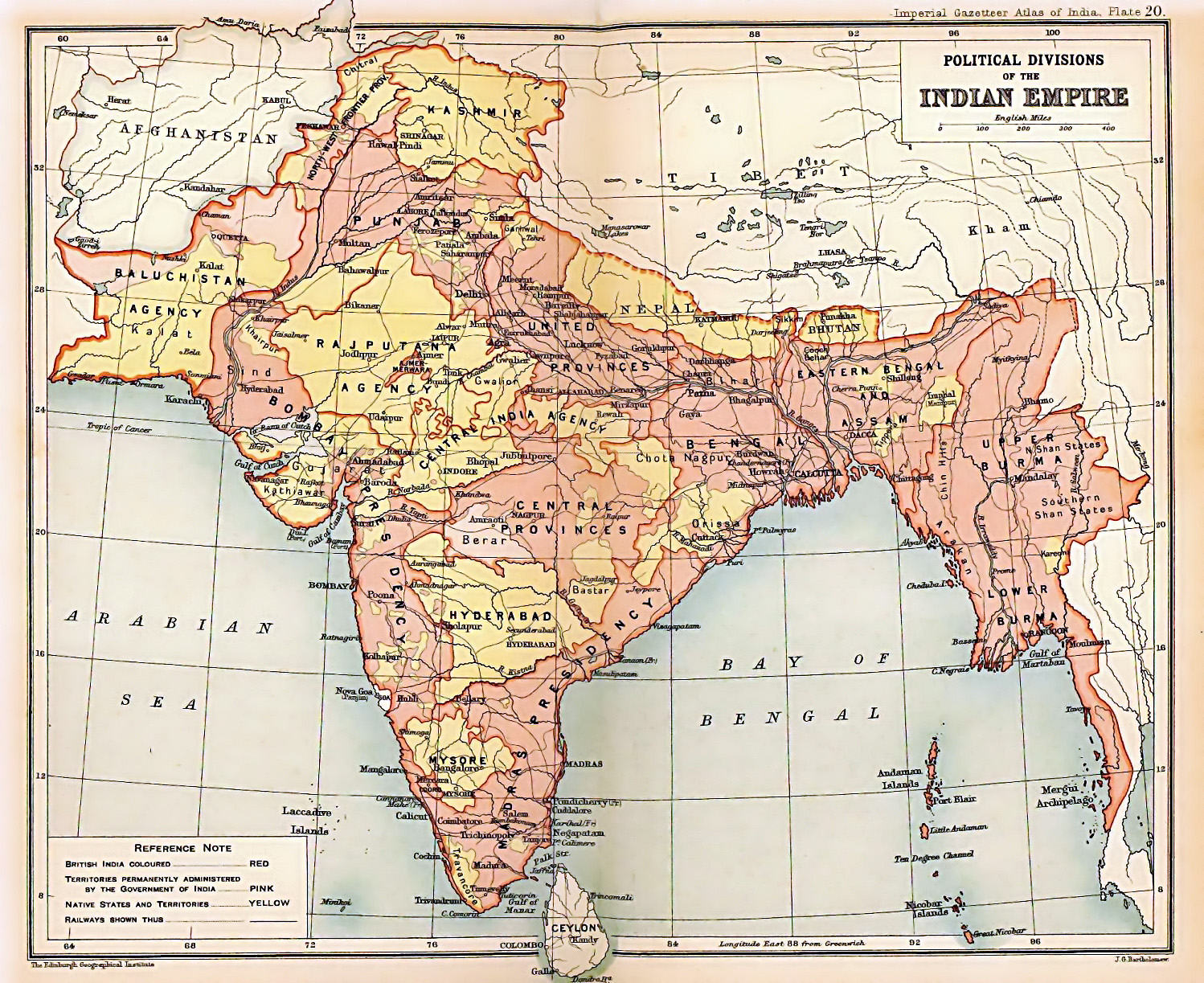
1909 map of the British Indian Empire, showing British India in two shades of pink and the princely states in yellow

The Bombay Presidency was bounded on the north by Baluchistan, the Punjab and Rajputana; on the east by Indore, the Central Provinces and Hyderabad; on the south by Madras Presidency and the Kingdom of Mysore; and on the west by the Arabian Sea. Within these limits were the Portuguese settlements of Goa, Daman and Diu, and the native state of Baroda which has direct relations with the government of India; while politically Bombay included the territory of Aden, in present-day Yemen. The total area, including Sind but excluding Aden, was 188,745 sq mi (488,850 km^{2}), of which 122,984 sq mi (318,530 km^{2}) were under British and 65,761 under native rule. The total population was 25,468,209 in 1901, of which 18,515,587 were resident in British territory and 6,908,648 in native states.

== Demographics ==
The Bombay Presidency had a large and diverse population. The census of 1901 gave a total of 25,468,209. By religion the population was 19,916,438 Hindu, 4,567,295 Muslim, 535,950 Jain, 78,552 Parsi and Irani Zoroastrians, and approximately 200,000 Christians. A significant number of Bene Israeli and Paradesi Jews were also present, most of them emigrated in 1948 after the Partition of Palestine and the establishment of the Jewish homeland (British mandate of Palestine) in Israel.

In Sindh, Islam had been the predominant religion after the Caliphate of Sunni Arab origins conquered it the 8th century. In Gujarat the predominant religion remained Hinduism, although the Sultanate of Guzerat has left its influence and imprints in northern parts of the province. The Deccan region is the home of Marathis, who constituted 30% of the population. The Konkan region was home to various Konkani Christian minorities and communities since the 16th century, due to the colonial era of the Portuguese in Goa and Bombay-Bassein. While in the Belgaum area of the Carnatic region, Lingayatis dating to the 12th century, was accepted by nearly 45% of the population. The Marathas were the predominant caste numbering 3,650,000 (1901), 1,900,000 Kunbis and other 350,000 Konkanis, and another 1,400,000 Marathas not specified.

The chief languages of the province were Sindhi in Sindh, Gujarati in northern division, Marathi in Konkan and the central division, Gujarati and Marathi in Baroda, Western India and Gujarat States Agency, and Marathi and Canarese in the southern division. There was also Bhil (120,000) spoken in the presidency.

== Administration ==
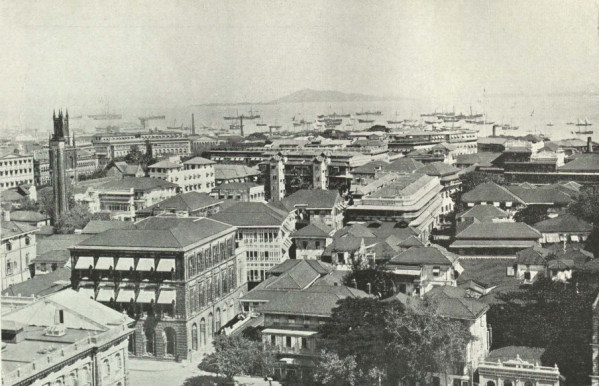
View of Bombay from Rajabai Tower, c. 1905

The Presidency was divided into five Commisserates and thirty-two districts with Bombay city as the capital. The five divisions were northwestern or Sind Division , the northern or Gujarat Division , the western or Konkan Division, the central or Deccan Division and the southern or Carnatic Division. In 1936 Sind Division become a separated province .

Division	Divisional Headquarters	Districts	Princely states
Sind Division	Karachi	Dadu, Hyderabad, Karachi, Nawabshah, Larkana, Sukkur, Thar and Parkar, Upper Sind Frontier	Khairpur
Gujarat Division	Ahmedabad	Ahmedabad, Bharuch, The Dangs, Kaira, Panch Mahals, Surat	Princely states of the Baroda and Gujarat States Agency and the Western India States Agency
Konkan Division	Bombay	Bombay City, Bombay Suburban, Colaba, Ratnagiri, Thana	Deccan States Agency
Deccan Division	Poona	Ahmednagar, East Khandesh, Nasik, Poona, Satara, Sholapur, West Khandesh	Deccan States Agency
Carnatic Division	Dharwad	Belgaum, Bijapur, Dharwad, North Kanara	

After separation of Sind Province, Bombay presidency have twenty-four districts under four divisions were the western or Konkan, the northern or Gujarat, the central or Deccan and the southern or Carnatic.

Division	Divisional Headquarters	Districts	Princely states
Gujarat Division	Ahmedabad	Ahmedabad, Bharuch, The Dangs, Kaira, Panch Mahals, Surat	Princely states of the Baroda and Gujarat States Agency and the Western India States Agency
Konkan Division	Bombay	Bombay City, Bombay Suburban, Colaba, Ratnagiri, Thana	Deccan States Agency
Deccan Division	Poona	Ahmednagar, East Khandesh, Nasik, Poona, Satara, Sholapur, West Khandesh	Deccan States Agency
Carnatic Division	Dharwad	Belgaum, Bijapur, Dharwad, North Kanara	

The government of Bombay was administered by a Governor-in-Council, consisting of the Governor as president and two ordinary members. The Governor was appointed by the British Crown on the advice of the Secretary of State for India. The members of his council were appointed from the Indian Civil Service. For making laws there was a legislative council, consisting of the Governor and his executive council, with certain other persons, not fewer than eight or more than twenty, at least half of them being non-officials. Each of the members of the executive council had in his charge one or two departments of the government; and each department had a secretary, an under-secretary, and an assistant secretary, with a numerous staff of clerks. The administration of justice throughout the Presidency was conducted by a High Court at Bombay, consisting of a chief justice and seven puisne judges, along with district and assistant judges throughout the districts of the Presidency.

Each of the four divisions were administered by a senior Indian Civil Service (ICS) officer of the rank of Commissioner while the districts were each administered by a District Collector (officially styled, Deputy Commissioner). The districts were further divided into sub-divisions each under the charge of a Deputy Collector or Assistant Collector, each sub-division comprising a few taluks or tehsils each administered by a tahsildar.

== Military ==
The East India Company had raised armies in each of the Presidencies, Bombay, Bengal and Madras. The Bombay Army consisted of a number of infantry regiments, sapper and miner units and irregular cavalry. A number of these continue to exist today in the Indian Army; examples being the Mahar Regiment, Maratha Light Infantry and the Grenadiers, amongst others, in the case of infantry, the Bombay Sappers as engineers and the Poona Horse amongst the cavalry.

Under Lord Kitchener's re-arrangement of the Indian army in 1904 the old Bombay command was abolished and its place was taken by the Western army corps under a lieutenant-general. The army corps was divided into three divisions under major-generals. The 4th (Quetta) Division, with headquarters at Quetta, comprised the troops in the Quetta and Sind districts. The 5th division, with headquarters at Mhow, consisted of three brigades, located at Nasirabad, Jabalpur and Jhansi, and included the previous Mhow, Deesa, Nagpur, Narmada and Bundelkhand districts, with the Bombay district north of the Tapti. The 6th division, with headquarters at Pune, consisted of three brigades, located at Bombay, Ahmednagar and Aden. It comprised the previous Poona district, Bombay district south of the Tapti, Belgaum district north of the Tungabhadra, and Dharwar and Aurangabad districts.

== Agriculture ==
The overwhelming majority of the population of the Bombay Presidency was rural and engaged in agriculture. The staple crops were Sorghum (jowar), and Pearl millet (bajra) in the Deccan and Khandesh. Rice was the chief product of the Konkan. Wheat, generally grown in the northern part of the Presidency, but specially in Sind and Gujarat, was exported to Europe in large quantities from Karachi, and on a smaller scale from Bombay. Barley was principally grown in the northern parts of the presidency. Finger millet (Nachani) and kodra furnished food to the Kolis, Bhils, Waralis, and other hill tribes. Of the pulses the most important are the chickpea or Bengal gram (Cicer arietinum), pigeon pea or tur (Cajanus cajan), catjang or kulti (Vigna unguiculata cylindrica), and urad bean (Vigna mungo). Principal oilseeds were sesame or til (Sesamum indicum), mustard, castor bean, safflower and linseed. Of fibres the most important were cotton, Deccan hemp (Hibiscus cannabinus), and sunn or tag (Crotalaria juncea). Much was done to improve the cotton of the presidency. American varieties were introduced with much advantage in the Dharwad collectorate and other parts of the southern Maratha country. In Khandesh the indigenous plant from which one of the lowest classes of cotton in the Bombay market takes its name has been almost entirely superseded by the superior Hinganghat variety. Miscellaneous crops: sugarcane, requiring a rich soil and a perennial water-supply, and only grown in favoured localities, chile peppers, potatoes, turmeric and tobacco.

== Industry ==
The chief industries of Bombay Presidency involved the milling of cotton. In the late 19th century steam mills sprang up in Bombay, Ahmedabad and Khandesh. In 1905 there were 432 factories in the presidency, of which by far the greater number were engaged in the preparation and manufacture of cotton. The industry is centred in Bombay, which contains nearly two-thirds of the mills. During the decade 1891–1901 the mill industry passed through a period of depression due to widespread plague and famine, but on the whole there was a marked expansion of the trade as well as a great improvement in the class of goods produced. In addition to the mills there were (1901) 178,000 hand-loom weavers in the province, who still have a position of their own in the manipulation of designs woven into the cloth. Silk goods were manufactured in Ahmedabad, Surat, Yeola, Nasik, Thana and Bombay, the material decorated with printed or woven designs; competition from European goods caused the silk industry to decline in the early 20th century. The custom of investing savings in gold and silver ornaments gave employment to many goldsmiths: the metal was usually supplied by the customer, and the goldsmith charged for his labour. Ahmedabad and Surat are famous for their carved woodwork. Many of the houses in Ahmedabad are covered with elaborate wood-carving, and excellent examples exist in Broach, Baroda, Surat, Nasik and Yeola. Salt was made in large quantities in the government works at Kharaghoda and Udu in Ahmedabad, and was exported by rail to Gujarat and central India. There was one brewery at Dapuri near Pune.

== Transportation ==
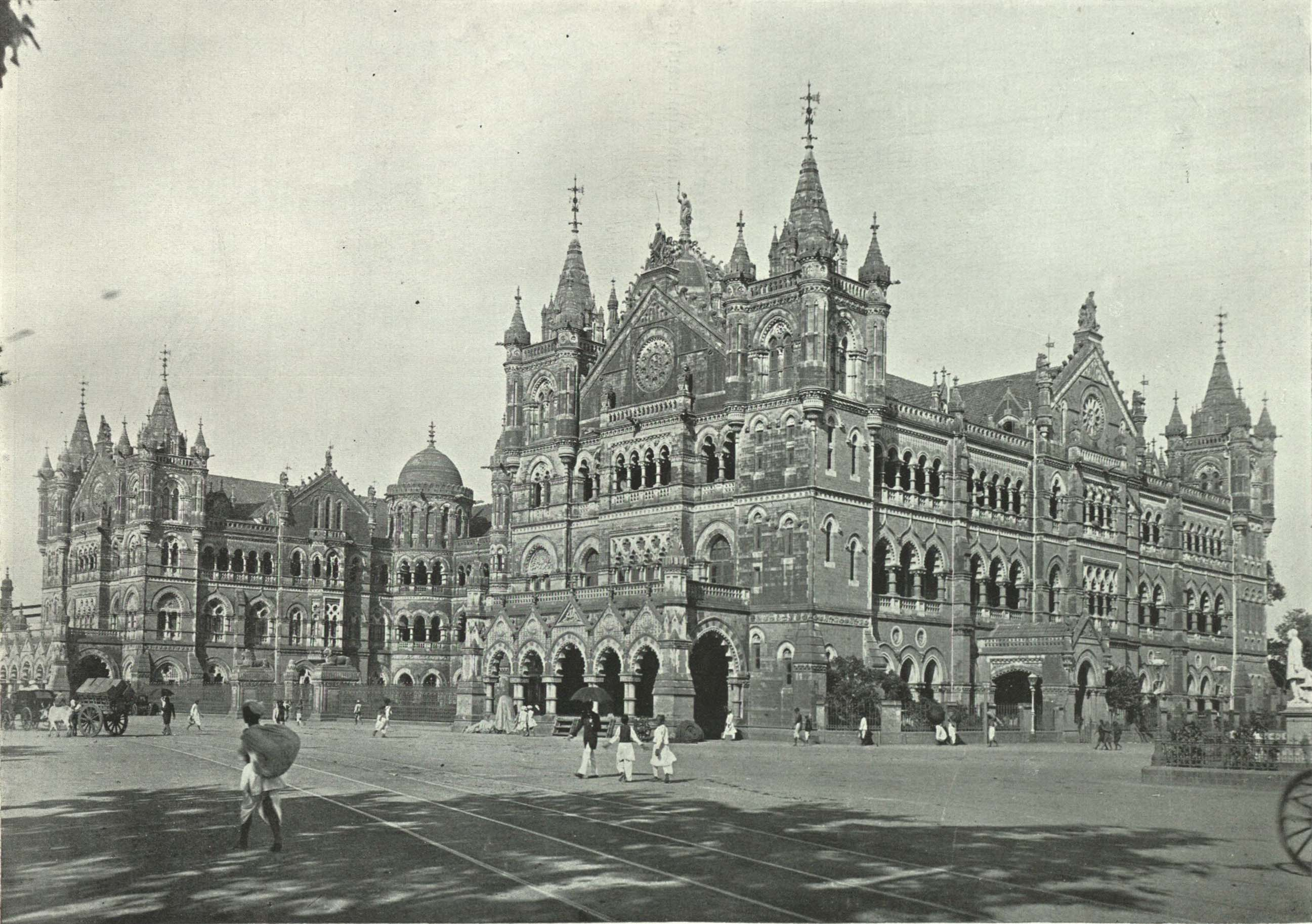
Victoria Terminus Railway Station, c. 1905

The Province was well supplied with railways, all of which, with one exception, concentrated at Bombay City. The exception is the North-Western line, which enters Sind from the Punjab and terminated at Karachi. The other chief lines are the Great Indian Peninsula, Indian Midland, Bombay, Baroda & Central India, and the Rajputana, Malwa & Southern Mahratta systems. In 1905 the total length of railway under the Bombay government open for traffic was 7,980 miles (12,840 km), which did not include the railway system in Sindh.

== Education ==
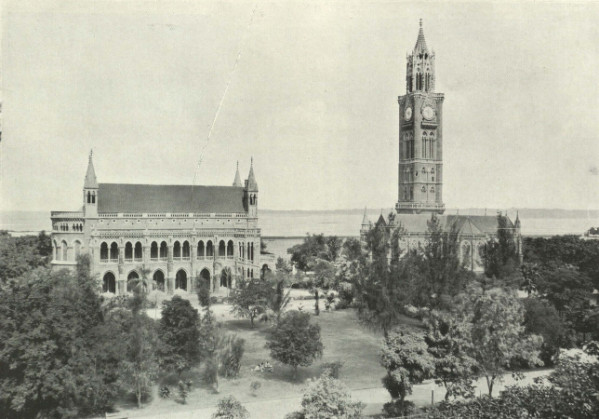
University Hall and Rajabai Tower, ca 1905

The University of Bombay was established in 1857, and had an administration consisting of a chancellor, vice-chancellor and fellows. The governor of Bombay was ex-officio chancellor. The education department was under a director of public instruction, who was responsible for the administration of the department in accordance with the general educational policy of the state. The native states generally adopted the government system. Baroda and the Kathiawar states employed their own inspectors. In 1905 the total number of educational institutions was 10,194 with 593,431 pupils. There were ten art colleges, of which two were managed by government, three by native states, and five were under private management. It was in the year 1913 that the first college of commerce in Asia, Sydenham College, was established. Sind Medical School, medical school in Hyderabad, Sind was established in 1881 and was affiliated with the University of Bombay. According to the census of 1901, out of a population of 25.5 million nearly 24 million were illiterate.

== Film industry ==
The film production era is said to have commenced in Bombay from 1913 when the first film, Raja Harishchandra by Dadasaheb Phalke made in 1912, was first shown publicly on 3 May 1913 at Mumbai's Coronation Cinema, effectively marking the beginning of the Indian film industry. Around one year before, Ramchandra Gopal (known as Dadasaheb Torne) had filmed a stage drama called Pundalik and shown it in the same theatre. However, the credit for making the first Indian feature film is attributed to Dadasaheb Phalke.

Other producers at Bombay during the presidency era were Sohrab Modi, Himanshu Rai, V. Shantaram, Shashadhar Mukherjee, and Ardeshir Irani. Ever since production of films took place, there started the trend of film making that established and further progressed, resulting in formation of the film industry and new film production companies as well as studios.

== Residencies ==
Outside the Presidency, numerous small states princely states such as those of Kathiawar and Mahikantha came under British suzerainty in a system of subsidiary alliances between 1807 and 1820.

The native states eventually comprised some 353 separate units, administered internally by their own princes, with the British responsible for their external affairs. Relations between British India and the states were managed by British agents placed at the principal native capitals; their exact status varied in the different states according to the relations in which the principalities stood with the paramount power.

The principal groups of states were North Gujarat, comprising Kutch, Kathiawar Agency, Palanpur Agency, Mahi Kantha Agency, Ambliara Rewa Kantha Agency and Cambay; South Gujarat, comprising Dharampur, Bansda and Sachin; North Konkan, Nasik and Khandesh, of the Khandesh Agency, Surgana and Jawhar; South Konkan and Dharwar, comprising Janjira, Sawantwadi and Savanur, as well as the territories under the Deccan States Agency, including the Deccan Satara Jagirs, Ichalkaranji, Sangli Akkalkot, Bhor, Aundh, Phaltan, Jath and Daphalapur, the southern Maratha states, comprising Kolhapur, among other states, and Khairpur in Sindh. The native states under the "supervision" of the government of Bombay were divided, historically and geographically, into two main groups. The northern or Gujarat group includes the territories of the Gaekwad of Baroda, with the smaller states which form the administrative divisions of Kutch, Palanpur, Rewa Kantha, and Mahi Kantha. These territories, with the exception of Kutch, have a historical connection, as being the allies or tributaries of the Gaekwad until 1805, when final engagements were included between that prince and the British government. The southern or Maratha group includes Kolhapur, Akalkot, Sawantwari, and the Satara and southern Mahratta Jagirs, and has a historical bond of union in the friendship they showed to the British in their final struggle with the power of the peshwa until 1818. The remaining territories may conveniently be divided into a small cluster of independent zamindaris, situated in the wild and hilly tracts at the northern extremity of the Sahyadri range, and certain. principalities which, from their history or geographical position, are to some extent isolated from the rest of the presidency.

Baroda State (Vadodara), one of the residencies of British India, was combined in the 1930s with the residencies of the princely states (agencies) of the northern Bombay Presidency to form the Baroda and Gujarat States Agency and subsequently expanded in Baroda, Western India and Gujarat States Agency in 1944.

== See also ==
- Bombay Army
- Cowaszee Nanabhoy Davar
- List of governors of Bombay
- Portuguese Bombay and Bassein
- Advocate-General of Bombay
- High Court of Bombay
- History of Tharparkar
- Bengal Presidency
- Madras Presidency

== Notes ==
1. A regiment made up of European soldiers.

== Bibliography ==
- Handbook of the Bombay Presidency: With an account of Bombay city. John Murray, London. 1881.
- The Bombay University Calendar for the Year 1880-81. Thacker & Co., Bombay. 1880.
- James Douglas (1900). Glimpses of old Bombay and western India, with other papers. Sampson Low, Marston & Co., London.
