= Chief Minister of Maharashtra =

Leader of the executive branch of Government of Maharashtra

- Mahārāṣṭrāce Mukhyamaṃtrī
- Emblem of Maharashtra

- Flag of India

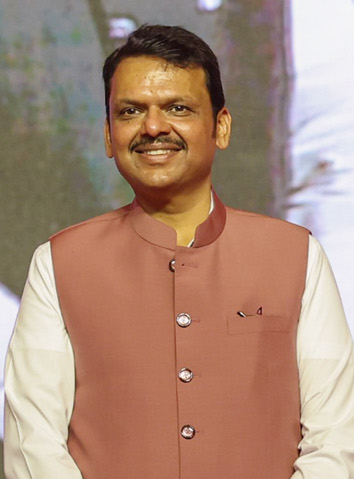
- Incumbent; Devendra Fadnavis since 5 December 2024
- Chief Minister's Office; Government of Maharashtra
- Style: The Honourable
- Status: Head of Government
- Abbreviation: CMoMaharashtra
- Member of: State Legislature; StateCabinet
- Reports to: Governor of Maharashtra; Maharashtra Legislature
- Residence: Varsha Bungalow, Malabar Hill, Mumbai
- Seat: Mantralaya, Mumbai
- Appointer: Governor of Maharashtra; by convention based on appointees ability to command confidence in the Legislative Assembly
- Term length: At the confidence of the assembly; 5 years and is subject to no term limits.
- Precursor: Prime Minister of Bombay Presidency; Chief Minister of Bombay State
- Inaugural holder: Dhanjishah Bomanjee Cooper (as Prime Minister of Bombay State); Balasaheb Gangadhar Kher (as Chief Minister of Bombay State); Yashwantrao Chavan (as Chief Minister of Maharashtra)
- Formation: 1 May 1960 (66 years ago)
- Deputy: Deputy Chief Minister of Maharashtra
- Salary: ₹4.08 million (US$44,000) annually
- Website: CMO Maharashtra

The chief minister of Maharashtra (IAST: Mahārāṣṭrāce Mukhyamaṃtrī) is the head of government of the Indian state of Maharashtra. As per the Constitution of India, the governor of Maharashtra is the state's de jure head, but de facto executive authority rests with the chief minister, a template applicable to all other Indian states. Following elections to the Maharashtra Legislative Assembly, the governor usually invites the political party (or a coalition of political parties) with a majority of assembly seats to form the government in the state. The governor appoints the chief minister, whose council of ministers is collectively responsible to the assembly. If the appointee is not a member of either the Legislative Council or the Legislative Assembly of Maharashtra, then the Constitution stipulates that they need to be elected within six months of being sworn in. Given that they have the confidence of the assembly, the chief minister's term is for five years, renewable, and is subject to no term limits. Usually, the chief minister also serves as leader of the house in the legislative assembly.

The state of Maharashtra was formed from parts of Bombay and Hyderabad States on 1 May 1960. Yashwantrao Chavan of the Indian National Congress, who was serving as the third chief minister of Bombay since 1956, became the first chief minister of the newly formed state. Marotrao Kannamwar succeeded him after the 1962 assembly elections, and is the only chief minister to die while in office. Vasantrao Naik, whose term extended for more than 11 years from December 1963 to February 1975, has been the longest serving chief minister. With the exception of Devendra Fadnavis of the Bharatiya Janata Party, and four people from Shiv Sena, all other chief ministers have been from the Congress and its breakaway parties. The President's rule has been imposed thrice in the state first from February to June 1980, second from September to October 2014, and lastly in November 2019.

Devendra Fadnavis is the current incumbent serving since 5 December 2024.

== Predecessors ==
=== Prime ministers of Bombay (1937–47) ===
The Bombay Presidency, which existed during the British Raj, was led by the prime minister of Bombay since the creation of the post in 1937.

# (Note: A parenthetical number indicates that the incumbent has previously held office.)	Portrait	Name	Term of office			Assembly	Appointed by (Governor)	Party
1		Dhanjishah Cooper	1 April 1937	19 July 1937	140 days	1st Provincial (1937 Elections)	The Lord Brabourne	Independent
2		Balasaheb Gangadhar Kher	19 July 1937	2 November 1939	2 years, 106 days	1st Provincial (1937 Elections)	Robert Duncan Bell	Indian National Congress
-		Vacant (Governor's Rule)	2 November 1939	30 March 1946	6 years, 148 days	Dissolved	-	N/A
(2)		Balasaheb Gangadhar Kher	30 March 1946	15 August 1947	1 year, 138 days	2nd Provincial (1946 Elections)	John Colville	Indian National Congress

=== Chief ministers of Bombay (1947–60) ===
Following the Indian Independence in 1947, the province of Bombay was established from the erstwhile Bombay Presidency. The Bombay State was created in 1950 following the adoption of the Constitution of India and its territory underwent constant change in the following years. It comprised the Bombay province (roughly equating to the present-day Indian state of Maharashtra, excluding South Maharashtra and Vidarbha) and parts of the princely states of the Baroda, Western India and Gujarat (part of present-day Gujarat) and Deccan states (parts of the present-day Maharashtra and Karnataka). During the reorganisation of Indian states in 1956, the Bombay state was enlarged by the addition of Saurashtra and Kutch States, the Marathi-speaking districts of Nagpur Division of Madhya Pradesh and Marathwada region of Hyderabad State, while the southernmost districts of the state were transferred to Mysore State.

#	Portrait	Name	Constituency	Term of office			Assembly	Appointed by (Governor)	Party
1		Balasaheb Gangadhar Kher	MLC	15 August 1947	21 April 1952	4 years, 250 days	Provincial Assembly 1946 election)	John Colville	Indian National Congress
2		Morarji Desai	Bulsar Chikhli	21 April 1952	31 October 1956	4 years, 193 days	1st (1952 elections)	Raja Maharaj Singh	Indian National Congress
3		Yashwantrao Chavan	Karad North	1 November 1956	5 April 1957	3 years, 181 days	1st (1952 elections)	Harekrushna Mahatab	Indian National Congress
3		Yashwantrao Chavan	Karad North	5 April 1957	30 April 1960	3 years, 181 days	2nd (1957 elections)	Sri Prakasa	Indian National Congress

== Chief ministers of Maharashtra (1960–present) ==
The Bombay state was dissolved to form the present-day states of Maharashtra and Gujarat by the Bombay Reorganisation Act, 1960, which was enacted by the Parliament of India on 25 April 1960 and came into effect on 1 May 1960.

Key

- No.: Incumbent number
- ^{†} Died in office
- ^{§} Returned to office after a previous non-consecutive term
- ^{RES} Resigned
- ^{NC} Resigned following a no-confidence motion

No	Portrait	Name	Constituency	Term of office			Assembly	Party (Alliance)
No	Portrait	Name	Constituency	Took office	Left office	Duration	Assembly	Party (Alliance)
1		Yashwantrao Chavan	Karad North	1 May 1960	20 November 1962	2 years, 203 days	1st (1957 elections)	Indian National Congress
2		Marotrao Kannamwar	Saoli	20 November 1962	24 November 1963^{[†]}	1 year, 4 days	2nd (1962 election)	Indian National Congress
3		P. K. Sawant	Chiplun	25 November 1963	5 December 1963	10 days	2nd (1962 election)	Indian National Congress
4		Vasantrao Naik	Pusad	5 December 1963	1 March 1967	11 years, 78 days	2nd (1962 election)	Indian National Congress
4		Vasantrao Naik	Pusad	1 March 1967	13 March 1972	11 years, 78 days	3rd (1967 election)	Indian National Congress
4		Vasantrao Naik	Pusad	13 March 1972	21 February 1975	11 years, 78 days	4th (1972 election)	Indian National Congress
5		Shankarrao Chavan	Bhokar	21 February 1975	17 May 1977	2 years, 85 days	4th (1972 election)	Indian National Congress
6		Vasantdada Patil	MLC	17 May 1977	5 March 1978	1 year, 62 days	4th (1972 election)	Indian National Congress
6		Vasantdada Patil	Sangli	5 March 1978	18 July 1978	1 year, 62 days	5th (1978 election)	Indian National Congress (U)
7		Sharad Pawar	Baramati	18 July 1978	17 February 1980	1 year, 214 days	5th (1978 election)	Indian Congress (Socialist)
–	State Emblem of India	Vacant (Note: Under Article 356 of the Constitution of India, in the event that a state government is unable to function according to constitutional provisions, the Central government can take direct control of the state machinery through the Governor. When President's rule is in force in a state, its council of ministers stands dissolved. The office of chief minister thus lies vacant. At times, the legislative assembly also stands dissolved.) (President's rule)	N/A	17 February 1980	8 June 1980	112 days	Dissolved	N/A
8		A. R. Antulay	Shrivardhan	9 June 1980	21 January 1982	1 year, 226 days	6th (1980 election)	Indian National Congress
9		Babasaheb Bhosale	Nehrunagar	21 January 1982	2 February 1983	1 year, 12 days	6th (1980 election)	Indian National Congress
(6)		Vasantdada Patil	Sangli	2 February 1983	3 June 1985	2 years, 121 days	6th (1980 election)	Indian National Congress
10		Shivajirao Patil	Nilanga	3 June 1985	12 March 1986	282 days	7th (1985 election)	Indian National Congress
(5)		Shankarrao Chavan	MLC	12 March 1986	26 June 1988	2 years, 106 days	7th (1985 election)	Indian National Congress
(7)		Sharad Pawar	Baramati	26 June 1988	4 March 1990	2 years, 364 days	7th (1985 election)	Indian National Congress
(7)		Sharad Pawar	Baramati	4 March 1990	25 June 1991	2 years, 364 days	8th (1990 election)	Indian National Congress
11		Sudhakarrao Naik	Pusad	25 June 1991	6 March 1993	1 year, 254 days	8th (1990 election)	Indian National Congress
(7)		Sharad Pawar	MLC	6 March 1993^{[§]}	14 March 1995	2 years, 8 days	8th (1990 election)	Indian National Congress
12		Manohar Joshi	Dadar	14 March 1995	1 February 1999	3 years, 324 days	9th (1995 election)	Shiv Sena (NDA)
13		Narayan Rane	Malvan	1 February 1999	18 October 1999	259 days	9th (1995 election)	Shiv Sena (NDA)
14		Vilasrao Deshmukh	Latur	18 October 1999	18 January 2003	3 years, 92 days	10th (1999 election)	Indian National Congress (MA)
15		Sushilkumar Shinde	Solapur South	18 January 2003	1 November 2004	1 year, 288 days	10th (1999 election)	Indian National Congress (MA)
(14)		Vilasrao Deshmukh	Latur	1 November 2004 ^{[§]}	8 December 2008 ^{[RES]}	4 years, 37 days	11th (2004 election)	Indian National Congress (MA)
16		Ashok Chavan	Mudkhed	8 December 2008	7 November 2009	1 year, 338 days	11th (2004 election)	Indian National Congress (MA)
16		Ashok Chavan	Bhokar	7 November 2009	11 November 2010 ^{[RES]}	1 year, 338 days	12th (2009 election)	Indian National Congress (MA)
17		Prithviraj Chavan	MLC	11 November 2010	28 September 2014 ^{[RES]}	3 years, 321 days	12th (2009 election)	Indian National Congress (MA)
–	State Emblem of India	Vacant (President's rule)	N/A	28 September 2014	30 October 2014	32 days	Dissolved	N/A
18		Devendra Fadnavis	Nagpur South West	31 October 2014	12 November 2019	5 years, 12 days	13th (2014 election)	Bharatiya Janata Party (MY)
-	State Emblem of India	Vacant (President's rule)		12 November 2019	23 November 2019	11 days	14th (2019 election)	N/A
(18)		Devendra Fadnavis	Nagpur South West	23 November 2019	28 November 2019^{[RES]}	5 days (Note: Fadnavis sworn in as the chief minister on 23 November 2019 at 8:00 am and resigned on 26 November 2019 at 4:00 pm making him the chief minister with the shortest tenure across Indian states. P. K. Sawant from Congress, who had served from 25 November 1963 to 4 December 1963, had previously held the office of the chief minister of Maharashtra for the fewest days.)	14th (2019 election)	Bharatiya Janata Party (BJP-NCP)
19		Uddhav Thackeray	MLC	28 November 2019	30 June 2022 ^{[RES]}	2 years, 214 days	14th (2019 election)	Shiv Sena (MVA)
20		Eknath Shinde	Kopri-Pachpakhadi	30 June 2022	5 December 2024	2 years, 158 days	14th (2019 election)	Shiv Sena (MY)
(18)		Devendra Fadnavis	Nagpur South West	5 December 2024	Incumbent	1 year, 344 days	15th (2024 election)	Bharatiya Janata Party (MY)

== Statistics ==
Time of office by party (as of 21 August 2026)
1. Indian National Congress (71.7%)
2. Shiv Sena (14.5%)
3. Bharatiya Janata Party (10.2%)
4. Indian Congress (Socialist) (2.39%)
5. Indian National Congress (U) (0.56%)
6. President's Rule (0.65%)

#	Chief Minister	Party	Length of term	
#	Chief Minister	Party	Longest tenure	Total tenure
1	Vasantrao Naik	INC	11 years, 78 days	11 years, 78 days
2	Vilasrao Deshmukh	INC	4 years, 37 days	7 years, 129 days
3	Devendra Fadnavis	BJP	5 years, 12 days	6 years, 361 days
4	Sharad Pawar	INC/IC(S)	2 years, 364 days	6 years, 221 days
5	Shankarrao Chavan	INC	2 years, 106 days	4 years, 191 days
6	Manohar Joshi	SS	3 years, 324 days	3 years, 324 days
7	Prithviraj Chavan	INC	3 years, 321 days	3 years, 321 days
8	Vasantdada Patil	INC(U)/INC	2 years, 121 days	3 years, 183 days
9	Uddhav Thackeray	SS	2 years, 214 days	2 years, 214 days
10	Yashwantrao Chavan	INC	2 years, 203 days	2 years, 203 days
11	Eknath Shinde	SS	2 years, 158 days	2 years, 158 days
12	Ashok Chavan	INC	1 year, 338 days	1 year, 338 days
13	Sushilkumar Shinde	INC	1 year, 288 days	1 year, 288 days
14	Sudhakarrao Naik	INC	1 year, 254 days	1 year, 254 days
15	A. R. Antulay	INC	1 year, 226 days	1 year, 226 days
16	Babasaheb Bhosale	INC	1 year, 12 days	1 year, 12 days
17	Marotrao Kannamwar	INC	1 year, 4 days	1 year, 4 days
18	Shivajirao Patil	INC	282 days	282 days
19	Narayan Rane	SS	259 days	259 days
20	P. K. Sawant	INC	10 days	10 days

== See also ==
- List of chairmen of the Maharashtra Legislative Council
- List of leaders of the house in the Maharashtra Legislative Council
- List of leaders of the opposition in the Maharashtra Legislative Council
- List of speakers of the Maharashtra Legislative Assembly
- List of deputy speakers of the Maharashtra Legislative Assembly
- List of leaders of the opposition in the Maharashtra Legislative Assembly
