= B. G. Kher =

Indian politician, 1st Chief Minister of Bombay State (1888–1957)

Balasaheb Gangadhar Kher
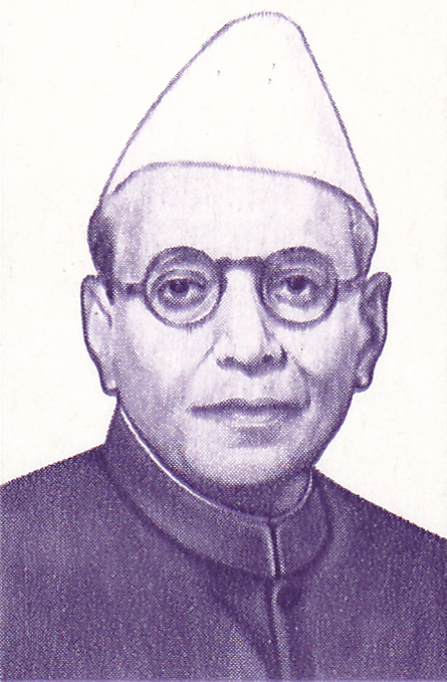

1st Chief Minister of Bombay State
- In office 15 August 1947 – 21 April 1952
- Preceded by: Office Established (Himself as Prime Minister)
- Succeeded by: Morarji Desai

2nd Prime Minister of Bombay State
- In office 30 March 1946 – 15 August 1947
- Preceded by: Governor's Rule
- Succeeded by: Office Abolished (Himself as Chief Minister)
- In office 19 July 1937 – 2 November 1939
- Preceded by: Dhanjishah Cooper
- Succeeded by: Governor's Rule

Personal details
- Born: 24 August 1888 Ratnagiri, Bombay Presidency, British India
- Died: 8 March 1957 (aged 68) Pune, Bombay State, India
- Party: Indian National Congress
- Education: Wilson College
- Profession: Lawyer, Politician, Social worker, Solicitor

Balasaheb Gangadhar Kher (24 August 1888 – 8 March 1957) was an Indian politician who served as the prime minister of Bombay (1937–1939, 1946–1947) and the first chief minister (then called Premier) of Bombay State (1947–1952). He was awarded the Padma Vibhushan by the Government of India in 1954. A lawyer, solicitor and social worker by choice and politician by necessity, Kher was often described as "Sajjan", good and gentle. Kher was a scholar, an accomplished orator, and a man with no pretensions.

== Early life ==
Balasaheb Gangadhar Kher was born on 24 August 1888 at Ratnagiri in a Maharashtrian Brahmin family. He spent some years of his boyhood at Kundgol in the then Jamkhandi State. Later, he migrated at the instance of Gopal Krishna Gokhale to Pune to study at the New English School. Later he received a B.A. degree with high distinction from Wilson College (Mumbai) in 1908, where he was also awarded the Bhau Daji Lad prize for standing first in Sanskrit.

Kher along with Manilal Nanavati started a firm called Manilal Kher & Co. The firm commenced practice on 7 June 1918. The firm was the only firm in Mumbai to have its inauguration ceremony being presided over by the renowned judge Sir Frank Beaman. The firm's name was then changed to Manilal Kher Ambalal & Co.

== Political career ==
Kher's political career began in 1922. He was appointed as the Secretary of the Bombay branch of the Swaraj Party. During the Civil disobedience movement, he was arrested and sentenced to eight months' rigorous imprisonment and fine in 1930. He was again arrested in 1932 and sentenced to two years rigorous imprisonment and fine.

He became the second Prime Minister of the Bombay Province succeeding Dhanjishah Cooper in 1937 and continued in office until November 1939. He was arrested and imprisoned in 1940. During the Quit India struggle, he was arrested again and imprisoned in August 1942. He was released from prison on 14 July 1944.

He again became the Prime Minister of the Bombay province on 30 March 1946. He was instrumental in the establishment of Poona University (Now called the "Savitribai Phule Pune University"). A building in the university campus is named after him as "Kher Bhavan." Little Gibbs Road in Malabar Hill area of Mumbai was designated as B.G. Kher Marg in 1976. Kher was in office until 21 April 1952.

Kher was recuperating from an asthma attack at a private nursing home in Pune before he died on 8 March 1957.

== Reception ==
Kher allotted plots of land in Bandra East to people belonging to the Hindu-Khatik (Scheduled caste) community in 1950–51. That area is known as Kherwadi in his memory. Kher established schools and a hospital, and provided electricity and water supply for people staying in Kherwadi. The Hindu-Khatik community celebrates his birthday at his statue at the Nanda Deep Garden, Kala Nagar, Bandra East.

Declassified MI5 documents were appreciative of Kher and described him as preferable to other political candidates, due to his honesty, sincerity and a preference for the "Anglo" way of administration.

Political offices
Preceded by Dhanjishah Cooper	Prime Minister of Bombay Province; 19 July 1937 – 2 November 1939	Succeeded by Governor's rule
Preceded by Governor's rule	Prime Minister of Bombay Province; 30 March 1946 – 26 January 1950	Succeeded by Post abolished
Preceded by Post created	Chief Minister of Bombay State; 26 January 1950 – 21 April 1952	Succeeded by Morarji Desai
Diplomatic posts
Preceded by V. K. Krishna Menon	High Commissioner for India; 1952 - 1954	Succeeded by Vijaya Lakshmi Pandit
