= 1937 Sind Provincial Assembly election =

1937 Sind provincial elections
- 1937

All 60 seats in the Sind Legislative Assembly 31 seats needed for a majority
- Registered: 639,043
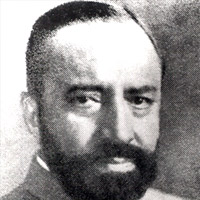

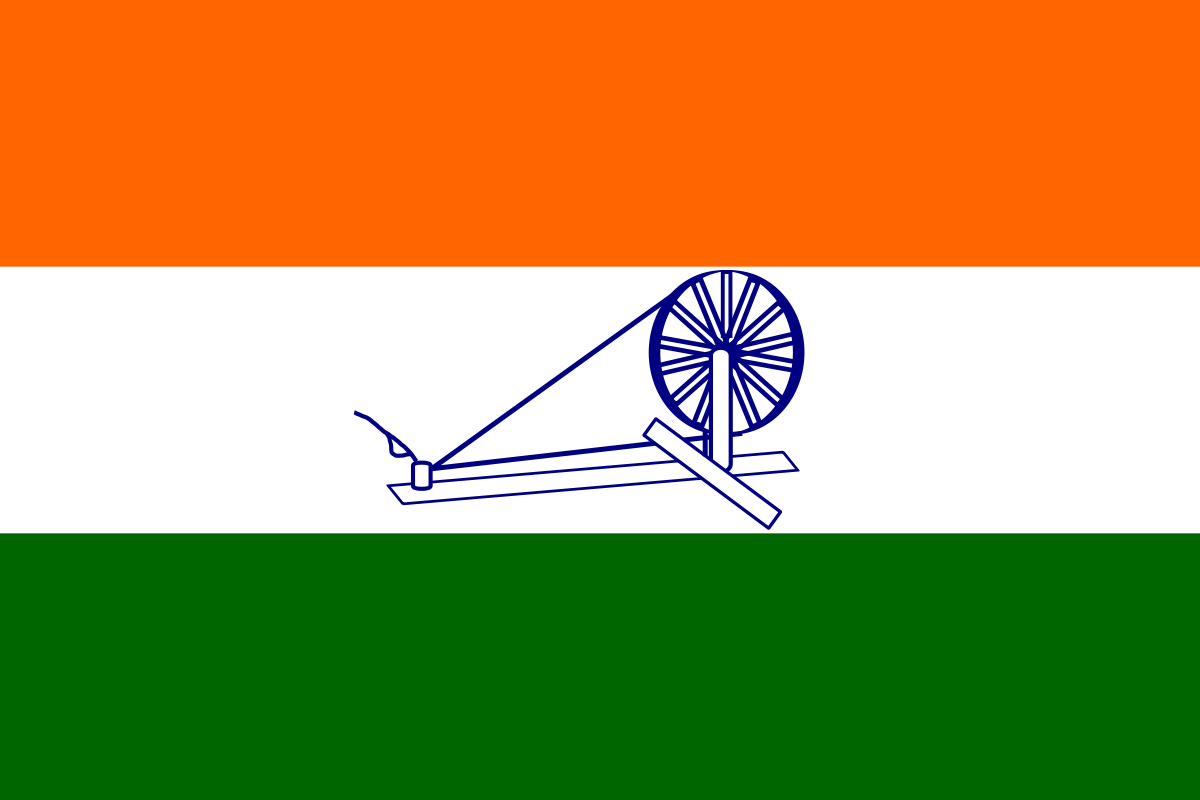
	First party	Second party	Third party
Leader	Abdullah Haroon	Mukhi Gobindram Pritamdas	Ghanshyam Jethanand Shivdasani
Party	SUP	ABHM	INC
Leader's seat	Lyari (defeated)	Upper Sindh	Hyderabad
Seats won	22	11	8
Elected Prime Minister
Ghulam Hussain Hidayatullah
SMPP

Elections to the Legislative Assembly of Sind were held in January and February 1937. These were the first elections in the province after its creation in 1936. The Communal Award of 1932 had allocated sixty assembly seats to Sind, based on which it now formed an assembly of its own.

The seats were divided amongst the following electoral colleges; Muslims Rural 31 seats, Muslims Urban 2 seats, Women Muslim Urban 1 seat, General Rural 15 seats, General Urban 3 seats, Women General Urban 1 seat, Europeans 2 seats, Landowners 2 seats, Commerce and Industry 2 seats and Labour 1 seat. In total, there were 639,043 eligible voters.

The Sind United Party won twenty-two of the Muslim seats, the Sind Muslim Political Party won four seats 4 whilst the Sind Azad Party won three seats. The party identity of one Muslim delegate was unclear. Independent candidates won the remaining nine seats from the Muslim constituencies.

In the General constituencies, the Sind Hindu Mahasabha won eleven seats, the Congress Party eight seats, Independent Hindus two seats and Independent Labour Party one seat. From the European and Commercial and Industry constituencies, non-party candidates were elected.

However, whilst the Sind United Party had emerged as the winner of the election its two most prominent leaders (Haji Abdullah Haroon and Shah Nawaz Bhutto) had failed to win the seats they contested. Haroon had contested the Lyari constituency, in northern Karachi. The Lyari seat was won by Sardar Allah Baksh Gabol. The Larkana seat, which Bhutto had contested, was won by Sheikh Abdul Majid Sindhi.

After the election the governor of Sind asked the leader of the Sind Muslim Political Party to form a cabinet. Largescale defections took place from the ranks of the Sind United Party and the Sind Azad Party in the assembly.

United Party senior leader Allah Bux Soomro later served as Premier of Sindh from 23 March 1938 – 18 April 1940 until a no-confidence motion was passed against him by the Indian National Congress and Muslim League. He was briefly elected back to power and served briefly from 27 March 1942 – 14 October 1942, but was dismissed by the Governor due to his support for the Quit India Movement.

== Results ==
Party	Hindu urban	Hindu rural	Hindu women	Muslim urban	Muslim rural	Muslim women	European	Commerce	Landholders	Labour	Total
Indian National Congress	2	3	1	-	-	-	-	1	-	-	7
Akhil Bharatiya Hindu Mahasabha	1	10	-	-	-	-	-	-	1	-	12
Sind United Party	-	-	-	1	16	-	-	-	-	-	17
Sind Muslim League	-	-	-	1	13	1	-	-	1	-	16
Sind Azad Party	-	-	-	-	1	-	-	-	-	-	1
Independent Hindus	-	2	-	-	-	-	-	-	-	1	3
Independent Muslims	-	-	-	-	1	-	-	-	-	-	1
Unaligned	-	-	-	-	-	-	2	1	-	-	3
Total	3	15	1	2	31	1	2	2	2	1	60

=== Members elected ===
Reservation	Constituency	Member
Hindu	Karachi City North	Popatlal A. Bhoopatkar
Hindu	Karachi City South	Rustomji Khurshedji Sidwa (Note: Parsis didn't had their own reservation or separate electorate, thus they stood as candidates for Hindu seats & voted alongside Hindus)
Hindu	Hyderabad City	Mukhi Gobindram Pritamdas
Hindu	Karachi	Nihchaldas Chatumal Vazirani
Hindu	Dadu	Jamshedji Nauserwanji Mehta
Hindu	Larkana	Rai Sahib Gokaldas Mewaldas
Hindu	Upper Sindh Frontier	Hemandas Rupchand Wadhwani
Hindu	Sukkur West	Daulatram Mohandas
Hindu	Sukkur Central	Bhojsingh Gurdinomal Pahlajani
Hindu	Sukkur East	Hassaram Sundardas Pamnani
Hindu	Nawabshah North	Newandram Vishindas
Hindu	Nawabshah South	Hotchand Hiranand
Hindu	Hyderabad suburbs and taluks	Ghanshyam Jethanand Shivadasani
Hindu	Hyderabad North	Ghanumal Tarachand
Hindu	Hyderabad South	Diwan Bahadur Hiranand Khemsingh
Hindu	Tharparkar West	Partabrai Khaisukhdas
Hindu	Tharparkar North	Shitaldas Perumal
Hindu	Tharparkar South	Akhiji Ratansingh Sodhi
Hindu	Hyderabad-cum-Karachi City women	Miss Jethibai Tulsidas Sipahimalani
Muslim	Karachi City North	Khan Sahib Allah Baksh Khudadad Khan Gabol
Muslim	Karachi City South	Muhammad Hashim Faiz Muhammad Gazdar
Muslim	Karachi North	Muhammad Usman Muhammad Khan Soomro
Muslim	Karachi South	Muhammad Yusuf Khair Muhammad Khan Chandio
Muslim	Karachi East	Ghulam Hyder Shah Sahibdino Shah Babri
Muslim	Dadu North	Ghulam Muhammad Abdullah Khan Isran
Muslim	Dadu Central	Pir Ilahi Baksh Nawaz Ali
Muslim	Dadu South	Syed Ghulam Murtaza Shah Muhammad Shah
Muslim	Larkana North	Abdul Majid Lilaram
Muslim	Larkana East	Khan Bahadur Muhammad Ayub Shah Muhammad Khan Khuhro
Muslim	Larkana South	Khan Bahadur Haji Amir Ali Khan Tharu Khan Lahori
Muslim	Larkana West	Mir Muhammad Khan Nawab Ghaibi Khan Chandio
Muslim	Upper Sindh Frontier East	Mir Zainuddin Khan Sundar Khan Sundarani
Muslim	Upper Sindh Frontier Central	Khan Sahib Sohrab Khan Sahibdino Khan Sharqi
Muslim	Upper Sindh Frontier West	Khan Sahib Jafar Khan Gul Muhammad Khan Burdi
Muslim	Sukkur North-West	Khan Bahadur Allah Baksh Muhammad Umar Soomro O. B. E.
Muslim	Sukkur South-West	Shamshuddin Khan Abdul Kabir Khan
Muslim	Sukkur South-East	Abdus Sattar Abdur Rahman
Muslim	Sukkur Central	Khan Sahib Pir Rasul Baksh Shah Mehbub Shah
Muslim	Sukkur North-East	Khan Bahadur Kaiser Khan Ghulam Muhammad Khan
Muslim	Nawabshah North	Syed Muhammad Ali Shah Allahando Shah
Muslim	Nawabshah North-West	Syed Nur Muhammad Shah Murad Ali Shah
Muslim	Nawabshah West	Rasul Baksh Khan Muhammad Khan Uner
Muslim	Nawabshah South	S. B. Jam Jan Muhammad Khan Muhammad Sharif Junejo
Muslim	Nawabshah East	Syed Khair Shah Imam Ali Shah
Muslim	Hyderabad North	Makhdum Ghulam Hyder Makhdum Zahiruddin
Muslim	Hyderabad North-West	Miran Muhammad Shah Zainulabdin Shah
Muslim	Hyderabad South-West	Mir Ghulam Allah Khan Mir Haji Hussain Baksh Khan Talpur
Muslim	Hyderabad East	Mir Bandeh Ali Khan Mir Haji Muhammad Hussain Khan Talpur
Muslim	Hyderabad South	Mir Ghulam Ali Khan Bandeh Ali Khan Talpur
Muslim	Tharparkar West	Sardar Bahadur Mir Allahbad Khan Imam Baksh Khan Talpur
Muslim	Tharparkar North	Khan Bahadur Syed Ghulam Nabi Shah Mauj Ali Shah
Muslim	Tharparkar South	Arbab Togachi Mir Muhammad
Muslim	Karachi City women	Mrs Jenubai Ghulam Ali Allana
European	Karachi City	J. J. Flockhart
European	Sind rural	Colonel H. J. Mahon
Commerce	Karachi Chamber of Commerce	G. H. Raschen
Commerce	Indian Commerce	Ishwardas Varandmal
Landholders		Sir Ghulam Hussain Hidayatullah
Landholders		Dialmal Daulatram
Labour		Narayandas Anandji Bechar
