= List of members of the 1st Provincial Assembly of Sindh =

1st Provincial Assembly of Sindh

Sindh was separated from the Bombay Presidency on 1 April 1936, under Government of India Act 1935. Province of Sindh, formally knows as Sind in British India, was officially inaugurate, Sir Lancelot Graham was appointed first Governor General of the newly created province by the British Government.

== Elections ==
First elections of the Legislative assembly of Sindh were held on 7 February 1937 with 60 seats allocated to the newly established assembly. On 15 April 1937, H.E. the Governor Sir Lancelot Graham, issued a notification to summon the first session of the first Sindh Legislative Assembly to meet on Tuesday 27 April 1937 at 11.00 a.m. in the Assembly Hall of the Sindh Chief Court Karachi pursuant to Section 62(3) of the Government of India Act 1935.

Serial	Description	Number of Seats
1	General Seats	18
2	Muhammaddan Seats	33
3	European Seats	02
4	Seats reserved for the representative of Commerce, Industry, Mining & Planting	02
5	Seats reserved for Landlords	02
6	Seats reserved for the representative of Labour	01
7	Seat reserved for the women's Constituency (General)	01
8	Seat reserved for the women's Constituency (Muhammadan)	01
Total		60

== List of Members of the Assembly ==
Complete list of members of the first provincial assembly of Sindh, 1937 - 1945.

Serial	Name	Constituency
1	Mr. Abdul Majid Lilram Shaikh	Larkana
2	Mr. Abdul Sattar Abdul Rahman Pirzada	Sukkur
3	Mr. Akhji Ratansing Sodho	Tharparkar
4	Khan Sahab Allah Bux Khudadad Khan Gabol	Karachi
5	Khan Bahadur Allah Bux Muhammad Umar Soomro, O.B.E.	Sukkur
6	Sahab Bahadur Mir Allahdad Khan Imam Bux Khan Talpur	Tharparkar
7	Khan Bahadur Haji Amir Ali Tharo Khan Lahori	Larkana
8	Mr. Arbab Togachi Mir Muhammad Nohri	Tharparkar
9	Mr. Bhojsing Gurdinomal Pahalajani	Sukkur
10	Mr. Dialmal Doulatram	Landload Seat
11	Mr. Doulatram Mohandas	Sukkur
12	Mr. Ghanshyam Jethanand Shivdasani	Hyderabad
13	Mr. Ghanumal Tarachand	Hyderabad
14	Mir Ghulam Ali Bandehali Talpur	Hyderabad
15	Mir Ghulam Allah Khan Mir Haji Hussain Bux Khan Talpur	Hyderabad
16	Makhdoom Ghulam Haider Makhdoom Zaheeruddin	Hyderabad
17	Pir Ghulam Haider Shah Sahib Dino Shah	Tharparkar
18	Khan Bahadur Ghulam Muhammad Abdullah Khan Isran	Larkana
19	Mr. Ghulam Murtaza Shah Muhammad Shah, Syed	Dadu
20	Mr. Ghulam Murtaza Shah Muhammad Shah, Syed	Tharparkar
21	R.S Gokaldas Mewaldas	Larkana
22	Mr. Hassaram Sunderdas Pamnani (General Rural)	Sukkur East
23	Dr. Hemandas Rupchand Wadhwani	Upper Sindh, Frontier District
24	Mr. Hotchand Hiranand Rai Bahadur	Nawabshah
25	Pir Illahi Bux Nawaz Ali	Dadu
26	Mr. Issardas Varindmal	Commerce & Industry (Indian Commerce)
27	Khan Sahab Jaffer Khan Gul Muhammad Khan Burdi	Upper Sindh, Frontier District
28	Mr. Jamshed Nusserwanji Mehta	Dadu
29	Jam Jan Muhammad Khan Muhammad Sharif Junejo	Nawabshah
30	Mrs. Jenubai Ghulam Ali Allana	Women Constituency Muhammadan
31	Miss. Jethibai Tulsidas Sipahimalani	Women Constituency General
32	Khan Bhahadur Kaisar Khan Ghulam Mohammad Khan Bozdar	Sukkur
33	Mr. Khair Shah Imam Ali Shah, Syed (Oath 3/8/1937)	Nawabshah
34	Col. H.J. Mahon	European Sindh
35	Syed Miran Muhammad Shah Zainul-ab-din Shah	Hyderabad
36	Mr. Muhammad Ali Shah Allahando Shah, Syed	Nawabshah
37	K.B Muhammad Ayub Shah Muhammad Khan Khuhro	Larkana
38	Muhammad Hashim Faiz Mohammad Alias Fabji Gazdar	Karachi
39	Mr. Mir Muhammad Khan Nawab Ghaibi Khan Chandio	Larkana
40	Mr. Muhammad Usman Muhammad Khan Soomro	Karachi
41	Mr. Muhammad Yousif Khan Bahadur Khair Mohammad Khan Chandio	Karachi
42	Mr. Naraindas Anandji Bechar	Karachi
43	Mr. Newandram Vishindas	Nawabshah
44	Mr. Nichaldas Chatomal Vazirani	Karachi
45	Mr. Nur Muhammad Shah Murad Ali Shah, Syed	Nawabshah
46	Dr. D.N.O Sullivan	Karachi
47	Mr. Partabrai Kaisukhdas (General Rural West)	Tharparkar
48	Dr. Popatlal A. Bhoopatkar	Karachi
49	Mr. G.H Raschen (Chamber of Commerce)	Karachi
50	Mr. Rasool Bux Khan Muhammad Bux Khan Unar	Nawabshah
51	Khan Sahab Rasool Bux Shah Mahboob Shah, Syed	Sukkur
52	Mr. Rustomji Khurshedji Sidhwa	Karachi
53	Mir. Bandehali Khan Mir Haji Mohammad Hussain Khan Talpur	Hyderabad
54	Mr. Shamsuddin Khan Abdul Kabir Khan Barikzai (Durani) Pathan	Sukkur
55	Mr. Sitaldas Perumal	Tharparkar
56	Mir Zain-ul-din Khan Mir Sunder Khan Sundrani	Upper Sindh, Frontier District
57	Khan Sahab Sohrab Khan Sahib Dino Khan Sarki	Upper Sindh, Frontier District
58	Mukhi Gobindram Pritamdas	Upper Sindh, Frontier District
59	Dewan Bahadur Hiranand Khemsing	Hyderabad
60	Sir Ghulam Hussain Hidayatullah Shaikh, Kt. K.C.S.I	Karachi
61	Mr. Flockhart, J.J. (9 August 1937 Oath)	Landlord seat
62	Mr. Muhammad Amin Abdul Aziz Khoso (29/3/1938 Oath)	Upper Sindh, Frontier District
63	MR. Hossack William Bartlet Lt. Col. (31/3/1938 Oath)	Karachi
64	Mr. Choithram T.Valecha (19/5/1938 Oath)	Karachi
65	Mr. Fraser J. (19/5/1938 Oath)	Karachi
66	Dr. Choithram P. Gidwani (4/1/1939 Oath)	Hyderabad
67	Lollumal Rewachand Motiwani (27/11/1940 Oath)	Sukkur
68	Mr. Lalla Menghraj Beherumal (18/3/1941 Oath)	Sukkur
69	Rais Ali Gohar Khan Mahar (1/3/1943 Oath)	Sukkur
70	Mr. Tarachand Dharamdas (24/6/1943 Oath)	Tharparkar
71	Mr. Ahmad Khan Sadhayo Khan Bahadur (23/2/1944 Oath)	Sukkur
72	Mir Hussain Bux Talpur Sian Bahadur (21/2/1945 Oath)	Hyderabad
73	Mr. Haji Moula Bux Muhammad Umer Soomro Khan Bahadur (21/2/1945 Oath)	Sukkur

== See also ==
- Pakistan
- British India
- Sindh
- Provincial Assembly of Sindh
- Pakistan Movement
- Fourteen Points of Jinnah
- List of members of the 2nd Provincial Assembly of Sindh
