= Gazdar =

Gazdar may refer to:

- Gazdar, Iran, a village in Kerman Province, Iran
- Gazdar, Razavi Khorasan, a village in Razavi Khorasan Province, Iran
- Gerald Gazdar (b. 1950), linguist and computer scientist
- Kaevan Gazdar (b. 1951), journalist
- Muhammad Hashim Gazdar (1895 – 1966), Pakistani politician
  - Gazdarabad, neighbourhood in Karachi Sindh, Pakistan, named after Muhammad Hashim Gazdar
- Mushtaq Gazdar, Pakistani cinematographer
- Gazdar, another name of the Silawat community in India and Pakistan
