= List of members of the 4th Provincial Assembly of Sindh =

First elections in Sindh, as part of Pakistan, for the Sindh Legislative Assembly, were held in May 1953. The elections were held for 111 seats, Sindh Muslim League fielded 92 candidates, Sindh Muslim League of M.A. Khuhro fielded 51 candidates and Sindh Awami Mahaz fielded 51 candidates for the election. Apart from candidates fielded by Political parties, 137 Muslims, 4 women and 43 minority candidates contested the elections.

== List of members of the 4th Provincial Assembly of Sindh ==
Tenure of the Assembly was from 12th September 1953 till 26th March 1955.

Serial	Name	Constituency
1	Mir Ghulam Ali Khan Mir	Guni North
2	Haji Bandeh Ali Khan Talpur	Guni North
3	Abdullah Haji Mohammad Ismail Mahesar	Kakar Mehar Joint
4	Abdul Fatah Wali Mohammad Memon	Warah West
5	Abdul Hamid Kadiir Bakhsh Jatoi	Kakar
6	Abdul Majid khan Karim Bakhsh Khan Jatoi	Mehar
7	Abdul Manan Abdul Rahman Kazi	Miro Khan
8	Abdul Khair alias Bashir Ahmed Khan Fateh Mohammad Khan, Jam	Ubauro
9	Ahmed Khan Haji Abdullah Khan Talpur	Nagarparkar
10	Ahmed Khan Fateh Khan Rajpar	Naushahro Feroze (South)
11	Ahmed Khan Rasul Bakhsh Bhutto	Ratodero
12	Ahmed Khan Shah Passand Khan	Shikarpur(Central)
13	Aidansing Nagji Sodho	Tharparkar-Nagarparkar
14	Begum Aishah Mohammad Abdul Aziz Arain	Muslim Women Central
15	Ali Asghar Shah Chandmir Shah Shirazi	Mirpur Sakro
16	Mir Haji Ali Ahmed Khan Mir Haji Nabi Bakhsh Khan Talpur	Hyderabad Taluka South
17	Ali Bilawal Khan Shah Ali Khan Domki	Kashmore
18	Ali Gohar Khan Haji Mahar	Rohri West
19	Ali Gohar Khan Mohammad Khuhro	Larkana East
20	Ali Hassan Mohammad Ibrahim Mangi	New Sukkur North
21	Pir Ali Mohammad Rashdi	Rohri West
22	Ali Nawaz Khan Ali Murad Khan Dharejo	Pano Akil
23	Mir Ali Nawaz Khan Talpur	Guni (South)
24	Pir Ali Shah Bhawan Ali Shah Jillani	Badin North
25	Mir Allah Bachayo Khan Haji Fateh Khan Talpur	Digri
26	Allan Khan Gaji Khan Leghari	Johi
27	Amir Bakhsh Motial Khan Mahar	Sukkur Taluka
28	Haji Nawabzada Jam Amir Ali Khan Haji Jam Mohammad Khan Junejo	Sinjhoro
29	Agha Badruddin Haji Shamsuddin Durrani	Gari Yaseen North
30	Dharamdas Motmal	Sindh North
31	Faiz Mohammad Sandal	Hyderabad City No.1
32	Fakir Mohammad Ahmed Bakhsh Unar	Dokri North
33	Haji Fazil Mohammad Khair Bakhsh Khan Laghari	Mirpur Bathoro
34	Haji Ghulam Ali Haji Abdullah Memon	Hyderabad City No.2
35	Haji Ghulam Hussain alias Haji Jam Jan Mohammad Khan Kadirdad Khan Marri Baloch	Shahdadpur South
36	Ghulam Hyder Shah Haji Pir Shah Syed	Umer Kot
37	Ghulam Hyder Shah Nawab Shah Syed	Sakrand Nawab Shah Join
38	Haji Ghulam Kadir Mohammad Waris Narejo	Sanghar
39	Ghulam Murtaza Shah Syed	Sehwan
40	Ghulam Mustafa Khan Ghulam Mohammad Khan Bhurgri	Jamesabad
41	Agha Ghulam Nabi Dur Mohammad Khan Pathan	Shikarpur West
42	Haji Ghulam Nabi Khan Haji Mohammad Ibrahim Dahraj	Kandiro North
43	Haji Ghulam Rasool K.B.Haji Imam Bux Khan Jatoi	Moro North
44	Pir Ghulam Rasool Shah Pir Jahan Shah Syed	Mirpurkhas Taluka
45	Honourable Mr Ghulam Rasool Sher Khan Kehar	Larkana West
46	Gul Mohammad Shah Wali Mohammad Shah	Kotri
47	Haji Gul Mohammad Wali Mohammad Khero	Moro South
48	Gulji Ratanji Menghwar	Tharparkar Central
49	Hassan Bakhsh Shah Haji Pir Shah, Syed	Sakrand
50	Pir Iiiahi Bakhsh Pir Nawaz Ali Shah	Dadu
51	Mir Imam Bakhsh Mir Haji Allahdad Khan Talpur	Samaro
52	Mir Jaffar Khan Mir Taj Mohammd Khan Jamali	Jacobabad
53	Jan Mohammad Bhai Khan	Mithi
54	Kadir Bakhsh Illahi Bakhsh Tunio	Warah West
55	Kararo ShahAlahando Shah Alis Andal Shah	Kandiaro South
56	Khair Shah Imam Ali Shah Syed	Nawabshah
57	Sardar Khan Mohammad Khan Wazir Khan Bozdar	Mirpur Mathelo
58	Khurshed Ahmed Mohammad Yaqoob Shaikh	Hyderabad City No.3
59	Lilji Akhji Sodho	Tharparkar
60	Mahboob Shah Pir Rasool Bakhsh Shah	Ghotki
61	Mamoo Khan Malik Bakadar Khan Malkani	Jati
62	Haji Mehar Ali Shah Nawaz Ali Shah Syed	Sujawal
63	Moosa Khan Allah Bakhsh Khan Bughio	Dokri South
64	Haji Moula Bakhsh Haji Mohammad Umar Soomro	Shikarpur
65	Mubarkak Ali Shah Jaffar Ali Shah Syed	Hyderabad City No.6
66	Mohammad Akbar Abdul Qayum Kazi	Hyderabad City No.4
67	Mohammad Akram Ghulam Nabi Pirzada	Old Sukkur
68	Sardar Mohammad Ali Shah Hassan Ali Shah	Hyderabad Taluka North
69	Mohammad Ashfaq Mohammad Shafi Hussain Siddiqui	Mirpurkhas
70	Mir Mohammad Bakhsh Khan Haji Khan Sahib Khan Talpur	Tango Bago
71	Mohammd Bakhsh Khan Saindino Khan Sarki	Thul East
72	Haji Pir Mohammad Hassan Bakhsh Abdul Kadir	Badin South
73	Syed Mohammad Hassan Shah Umed Ali Shah	Tando Allahyar North
74	Haji Mohammad Hayat Karimdad Junejo	Khipro
75	Sardar Mohammad Jaffar Khan Sardar Gul Mohammad Khan Buledi	Garhi Khairo
76	Pir Mohammad Mahdi Shah Pir Rashidullah Shah Jhanderowaro	Shahdadpur District
77	Mohammad Yusif Khair Mohammad Chandio	Shah Bunder
78	Makhdoom Mohammad Zaman Makhdoom Ghulam Mohammad Sahib Qureshi	Hala North
79	Syed Mohammad Zaman Shah Haji Bakadar Shah	Hala South
80	Haji Najumddin Fateh Khan Leghari	Dero Mohabat (Matli)
81	Nasir Mohammad Khan Mir Mohammad Khan Mandhwani	Tando Allahyar South
82	Sardar Noor Mohammad Khan Bijarani	Kandhkot West
83	Noor Mohammad Mir Khan Rahmoon	Chachiro
84	Noor Mohammad Shah Murad Ali Shah Syed	Naushahro Feroz NorthEast
85	Pir Qurban Ali Jamaluddin	Naushahro Feroz NorthWest
86	Rahim Bakhsh Allah Bakhsh Soomro	Shikarpur East
87	Rasool Bakhsh Mulla Moosa Khan Junejo	Garhi Yaseen
88	Rup Chand Chelaram	Tharparkar North
89	Rup Chand Seoomal Luhano	Hyderabad South and Thatta
90	Haji. Sadik Ali Abdul Karim Memon	Thatta
91	Saeeduddin Saleh	Hyderabad City No.7
92	Saifullah Mahboob Ali Khan Magsi	Shahdadkot
93	Pir Saleh Shah Ghulam Shah Syed	Johi-Dadu Joint
94	Shambhoomal Hiranand Luhano	Thar Desert
95	Sawaising Sonji Sodho	Tharparkar North
96	Shafqat Hussain Shah Atta Hussain Shah Musavi	Rohri East
97	Shah Nawaz Jamaluddin Pirzada	Nawab Shah Town
98	Shah Nazar Hussain Shah Ghulam Sabir	Tando Adam Shahdadpur, Municipal Area
99	Shahal Khan Bahadur Khan Khoso	Thul West
100	Begum Sharfunnissa Shahban	Muslim Women North
101	Sikandar Khan Hamlani	Mahal Kohistan
102	Sultan Ahmed Mir Mohammad Khan Chadio	Kamber West
103	Mir Sardar Sunder Khan Sardar Mir Zainuldin Khan Sundrani	Kandhkot East
104	Begum Tahira Aijaz Hussain Agha	Muslim Women Hyderabad
105	Teoomal Nathromal	Hyderabad North
106	Togachi Mir Mohammad Nuhri	Diplo
107	Haji Usman Khan Abdullah Khan Malkani	Ghorabari
108	Nawab Zahid Ali Khan Liaquat Ali Khan	Hyderabad City No.5
109	Abdul Sattar Pirzada (Oath 2.3.1954	Sukkur
110	Hamid Hussain Faruqi (Oath 2.3.1954)	Sukkur
111	Sirumal Kirpaldas (Oath 02.03.1954)	Sindh Central
112	Mir Bandeh Ali Khan Talpur (Oath 04.03.1954)	Dero Mohabat-Tango Bago Joint

== See also ==
- List of members of the 1st Provincial Assembly of Sindh
- List of members of the 2nd Provincial Assembly of Sindh
- List of members of the 3rd Provincial Assembly of Sindh
