= List of members of the 2nd Provincial Assembly of Sindh =

Provincial elections were held in British India in January 1946 to elect members of the legislative councils of British Indian provinces.

== List of Members of the 2nd Provincial Assembly of Sindh ==
Tenure of the 2nd provincial assembly was from 12 March 1946 to September 1946.

Serial	Name	Constituency
1	Khan Sahab Meer Dadan Ahmad Khan Lund	Sukkur
2	Ghulam Hussain Hidayatullah	Karachi
3	M. A. Khuhro	Larkana
4	Mir Ghulam Ali Khan Talpur	Hyderabad
5	Pir Illahi Bakhsh	Dadu
6	Abdus Sattar Abdul Rahman Pir Zada	Sukkur
7	Ali Akbarshah Ahmadshah	Dadu
8	Ali Goharkhan Haji Khan Mahar	Sukkur
9	Ali Muhammad Ata Muhammad Mari	Nawabshah
10	Amirali Khan Lahori	Larkana
11	Arbab Togachi Mir Muhammad Nohari	Tharparkar
12	Agha Badarudin Ahmad Shamsuddin Khan Durani	Sukkur
13	Pir Bakadar Shah	
14	Mir Bandehali Khan Talpur	Hyderabad
15	Choithram T.Valecha	Karachi
16	Khan Bahadur Haji Fazal Muhammad Khan Laghari	Karachi
17	J.Fraser	Karachi
18	Ghanshyam Jethanandi	Hyderabad
19	Khan Bhadur Ghulam Wassan	Tharparkar
20	Mr. Ghulam Murtaza Shah Muhammad Shah Sayed	Dadu
21	Mr. Ghulam Mustafa Muhammad Khan Bhurgri	Tharparkar
22	Khan Sahab Haji Ghulam Rasul Khan Jatoi	Nawabshah
23	Dr. Gobindram D.Punjabi	Sukkur
24	Mukhi Gobindram Pritamdas	Upper Sindh, Frontier District
25	Mr. Haridas Lalji.	Karachi
26	Mr. Holaram H. Keswani	Sukkur
27	Lt.Col. William Bartlet Hossack	Karachi
28	S.B. Mir Hussain Bakhsh Khan Talpur	Hyderabad
29	Mr. Issardas Varindamal	Commerce Industry Indian Commerce
30	Mr. Jaffar Khan Taj Muhammad Khan Jamali	Upper Sindh, frontier District
31	Miss. Jethi T. Sipahimalani	Women Constituency General
32	Swami Krishnanand Sanyasi	Tharparkar
33	Mr. Madhavdas Shivalomal	Upper Sindh, Frontier District
34	Mr. Mahmood Abdullah Haroon	Karachi
35	Sayed Muhammadali Shah Allahando Shah	Nawabshah
36	Col. H. J. Mahon	European Sindh
37	Mir Maqbool Khan Jam Mir Baloch	
38	Mr. Menghumal Perumal	Tharparkar
39	Sayed Miran Muhammad Shah, Zainul-ab-din Shah	Hyderabad
40	Mr. Mohammad Khan Chandio	Larkana
41	Mr. Mohammad Yusif Chandio	Karachi
42	K. B. Haji Moula Bakhsh Muhammad Umer Soomro	Sukkur
43	Mr. Muhammad Azam Muhammad Ibrahim	Nawabshah
44	Haji Muhammad Hashim Faiz Muhammad alias Fabji Gazdar	Karachi
45	Mr. Nabi Bakhsh Illahi Bakhsh Bhutto	Larkana
46	Mr. Naraindas A. Bechar	Karachi
47	Mr. Narain R. Malkani	
48	Mr. Newandram Vishindas.	Karachi
49	Mr. Nihchaldas C. Vazirani	Karachi
50	Mr. Nur Muhammad Shah Muradali Shah	Nawabshah
51	K. S. Nur Muhammad Khan Sher Muhammad Khan Bijarani	Upper Sindh, Frontier District
52	Mr. Parsram Vishinsingh Tahilramani	Dadu
53	Mr. Partabrai Khaisukhdas	Tharparkar
54	Mr. Sardarkhan Dilmurad Khan Khoso.	Upper Sindh, Frontier District
55	Mr. R. K. Sidhwa.	Karachi
56	Mr. Sirumal Vishindas	Larkana
57	Mr. Tahilram Teckchand	Hyderabad
58	Mr. Vishnu Nenaram Sharma	
59	Mr. Sirumal Kirpaldas	Sindh Central
60	Mrs. Jenubai G. Allana. (Oath on 14th March 1946)	Women Constituency for Muhammadan
