= List of members of the 3rd Provincial Assembly of Sindh =

Second Legislative Assembly of Sindh was dissolved by Governor Sir Francis Mudie due no confidence motion against the Premier of the second assembly, elections for the third legislative assembly of Sindh took place on 9 December 1946. All India Muslim league won 33 out of 35 Muslim seats of the assembly.

== List of members of the 3rd Provincial Assembly of Sindh ==
Tenure of the third provincial assembly of Sindh started on 17 February 1947 till 29 December 1951.

| Serial | Name | Constituency |
|---|---|---|
| 1 | Ghulam Hussain Hidayatullah | Karachi |
| 2 | Mohammad Ayub Khan Khuhro | Larkana |
| 3 | Mir Bandeh Ali Khan Talpur | Hyderabad |
| 4 | Sardar Jam Basheer Khan Dahar | Sukkur |
| 5 | Mir Ahmed Khan Abdullah Khan Talpur | Tharparkar |
| 6 | Ali Mohammad Atta Mohammad Marri | Nawabshah |
| 7 | Pir Ali Shah Bhawan Shah | Karachi |
| 8 | Agha Badru | Sukkur |
| 9 | Anwar Hussain Ghulam Hussain Hidayatullah | Karachi |
| 10 | Choithram T. Valecha | Karachi |
| 11 | Kazi Fazullullah Ubeidullah | Larkana |
| 12 | J. Fraser | Karachi |
| 13 | Ghanshym Jethanand | Hyderabad |
| 14 | Ghulam Mohammad Mohammad Hashim Wassan | Tharparkar |
| 15 | Ghulam Nabi Mohammad Ibrahim Dehraj | Nawabshah |
| 16 | Dr. Gobindram D. Punjabi | Sukkur |
| 17 | Mr. Haridas Lalji | Karachi |
| 18 | Mr. Hollarm H. Keswani | Sukkur |
| 19 | Mr. Ali Gohar Khan Haji Khan Mahar | Sukkur |
| 20 | Mr. Ali Akbar Shah Ahmed Shah Syed | Dadu |
| 21 | Lt. Col. W. B. Hossack | Karachi |
| 22 | Issardas Varindmal | Commerce & Industry, Indian Commerce |
| 23 | Mir Jaffer Khan Mir Taj Mohammad Khan Jamali | Upper Sindh Frontier |
| 24 | Jenubai Ghulam Ali Allana | Women Constituency Muhammadan |
| 25 | Jethibai Tulsidas Sipahimalani | Women Constituency General |
| 26 | Sardar Kaisar Khan Ghulam Mohammad Khan Bozdar | Sukkur |
| 27 | Sawami Krishnanand Sanyasi | Tharparkar |
| 28 | Madhavdas Shivaiomal | Upper Sindh Frontier |
| 29 | Col. H.J. Mahon | European Sindh |
| 30 | Mr. Menghumal Perumal | Tharparkar |
| 31 | K.B. Haji Moula Bakhsh Soomro | Sukkur |
| 32 | Dr. Mohammad Akbar Abdul Qayoom Qazi | Hyderabad |
| 33 | Mohammad Azam Mohammad Ibrahim | Nawabshah |
| 34 | Mohammad Khan Nawab Ghaibi Khan Chandio | Larkana |
| 35 | Haji Mohammad Hashim Faiz Mohammad alias Fabji Gazdar | Karachi |
| 36 | Mohammad Mujtaba Mohammad Mustafa Kazi | Labour |
| 37 | Narain R. Malkani | |
| 38 | Newandram Vishindas | Karachi |
| 39 | Nihchaldas C. vazirani | Thatta |
| 40 | Fazul Mohammad Khan Leghari | Thatta |
| 41 | Noor Mohammad Khan Sher Mohammad Khan Bijarani | Upper Sindh Frontier |
| 42 | Parsram Vishinsing Pahilramani | Dadu |
| 43 | Partab Rai Khaisukhdas | Tharparkar |
| 44 | Rasool Jatoi | Nawabshah |
| 45 | Rustomji Khurshedji Sidhwa | Karachi |
| 46 | Sardar Khan Dilmurad Khan Khoso | Upper Sindh Frontier |
| 47 | Siroomal Vishandas | Karachi |
| 48 | Sirumal Kirpaldas | Sindh Central |
| 49 | Tahilram Tekchand | Hyderabad |
| 50 | Togachi Mir Mohammad Nohri | Tharparkar |
| 51 | Vishnu Nenaram Sharma | |
| 52 | Haji Pir Illah Bakhsh (Oath 18.02.1947) | Dadu |
| 53 | Makhdoom Ghulam Hyder Zaheeruddin Qureshi | Hyderabad |
| 54 | Noor Mohammad Shah Murad Ali shah | Nawahshah |
| 55 | Mir Haji Hussain Bakhsh Khan Talpur | Hyderabad |
| 56 | Rahim Bakhsh Allah Bakhsh Khan Soomro | Sukkur |
| 57 | Mehmoodabad Abdullah Haroon (Oath 20.02.1947) | Karachi |
| 58 | Mir Ghulam Ali Khan Talpur (Oath 22.02.1947) | Hyderabad |
| 59 | Honourable Sardar Nabi Bakhsh Bhutto (Oath 10.03.1947) | Larkana |
| 60 | Mr. Shah Murad Khan Shah Nawaz Khan (Oath 26.06.1947) | |

The following members gave oath of allegiance to the new established state of Pakistan on 4 February 1948.

| Serial | Name | Constituency |
|---|---|---|
| 1 | Mohammad Ayub Khan Khuhro | Larkana |
| 2 | Pir Illahi Bakhsh | Dadu |
| 3 | Mir Ghulam Ali Khan Talpur | Hyderabad |
| 4 | Kazi Fazullullah | Larkana |
| 5 | Mir Ahmed Khan Abdullah Khan Talpur | Tharparkar |
| 6 | Syed Ali Akbar Shah Ahmed Shah | Dadu |
| 7 | Haji Ali Mohammad Atta Mohammad Marri | Nawabshah |
| 8 | Rias Ali Gohar Khan Haji Khan Mahar | Sukkur |
| 9 | Pir Ali Shah Bahawan Shah | Karachi |
| 10 | Ahga Badruddin Ahmed Shamsuddin Khan Durrani | Sukkur |
| 11 | Anwar Hussain Ghulam Hussain Hidayatullah | Karachi |
| 12 | Mir Bandeh Ali Khan Talpur | Hyderabada |
| 13 | K.B. Haji Fazal Mohammad Khan Leghari | Thatta |
| 14 | Ghulam Nabi Khan Dur Mohammad Pathan, Agha | Sukkur |
| 15 | Ghulam Mohammad Khan Mohammad Hashim Wassan | Tharparkar |
| 16 | K.S. Haji Ghulam Rasool Khan Jatoi | Nawabshah |
| 17 | K.S. Haji Ghulam Rasool Khan Jatoi | Karachi |
| 18 | Hollarm H. Keswani | Sukkur |
| 19 | Lt. Col. W. B. Hossack | Karachi |
| 20 | Mir Haji Hussain Bux Khan Talpur | Hyderabad |
| 21 | Seth Issardas Varindmal | Commerce & Industry |
| 22 | Jenubai Ghulam Ali Allana | Women Constituency Muhammadan |
| 23 | Mir Jaffer Khan Mir Taj Mohammad Khan Jamali (Present 06-02-1948) | Upper Sindh Frontier |
| 24 | Mohammad Abdullah Haroon | Karachi |
| 25 | Jethibai Tulsidas Sipahimalani | Women Constituency General |
| 26 | Sardar Kaisar Khan Ghulam Mohammad Khan Bozdar | Sukkur |
| 27 | K.B. Haji Moula Bakhsh Mohammad Umer Soomro | Sukkur |
| 28 | Mohammad Akbar Abdul Qayyoom Kazi | Hyderabad |
| 29 | Haji Mohammad Hashim Faiz Mohammad alias Fabji Gazdar | Karachi |
| 30 | Mohammad Mujtaba Mohammad Mustafa Kaz | Labour |
| 31 | Nabi Bakhsh Illahi Bakhsh Bhutto | Larkana |
| 32 | Noor Mohammad Shah Murad Ali Shah Syed | Nawabshah |
| 33 | Partabrai Khaisukdhas | Tharparkar |
| 34 | Mohammad Khan Nawab Ghaibi Khan Chandio | Larkana |
| 35 | Sardar Khan Dil Murad Khan Khoso | Upper Sindh Frontier |
| 36 | Sirumal Kirpaldas | Sindh Central |
| 37 | Siroomal Vishandas | Larkana |
| 38 | Arbab Togachi Mir Mohammad Nohri | Tharparkar |
| 39 | Mohmmad Ayub Shah Mohammad Khuhro (Present 05-02-1948) | Larkana |
| 40 | Tahilram Tekchand (Present in Session 05-02-1948) | Hyderabad |
| 41 | Makhdoom Ghulam Haider Zaheeruddin Qureshi (Oath 06-02-1948) | Hyderabad |
| 42 | Madhowdas Shivalomal (Oath 06-02-1948) | Upper Sindh Frontier |
| 43 | Ghulan Nabi Mohammad Ibrahim Dehraj (Oath 07- 02-1948) | Nawabshah |
| 44 | Mohammad Azam Mohammad Ibrahim (Oath 06-02- 1948) | Nawabshah |
| 45 | Menghumal Perumal (Oath 10-02-1948) | Tharparkar |
| 46 | Nur Mohammad Sher Mohammad Bijarani (Present 11-02-1948) | Upper Sindh Frontier |
| 47 | Rahim Bakhsh Allah Bakhsh Soomro (Oath 16-02-1948) | Sukkur |
| 48 | Syed Miran Mohammad Shah Zainulabdin Shah (present 17-02-1949) | Hyderabad |
| 49 | Abdul Sattar Abdul Rehman Pirzada (Oath 09-03- 1949) | Sukkur |
| 50 | Syed Khair Shah Imam Ali Shah (Oath 10-01-1950) | Nawabshah |
| 51 | Al-Haj Ghulam Hussain alias Jan Mohammad Marri | Nawabshah |
| 52 | Yousuf A. Haroon (Oath 13-01-1950) | Karachi |
| 53 | Abdul Latif P. Panhawar (Oath 21-03-1951) | Dadu |
| 54 | Ahmed Sulan Mohammad Khan Chandio | Larkana |
| 55 | Hassan Ahmed Shah | Hyderabad |
| 56 | Ahsan-ul-Haq Kaz | Hyderabad |
| 57 | Hamid Hussain Faruqi | Sukkur |
| 58 | Mohammad Ayub Qureshi | Sukkur |
| 59 | M.A. Aziz | Dadu |
| 60 | Mohammad Usman | Thatta |
| 61 | Shah Nazar Hassan | Nawabshah |

== See also ==
List of members of the 1st Provincial Assembly of Sindh

List of members of the 2nd Provincial Assembly of Sindh

List of members of the 4th Provincial Assembly of Sindh
