= 1953 Sindh provincial election =

Pakistani provincial election

- May 1953

All 111 seats in the Provincial Assembly 57 seats needed for a majority
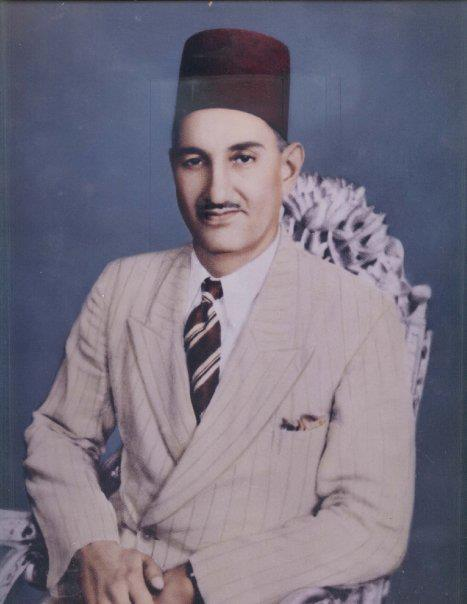

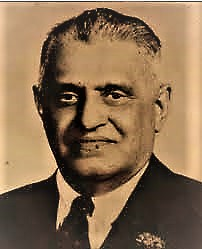

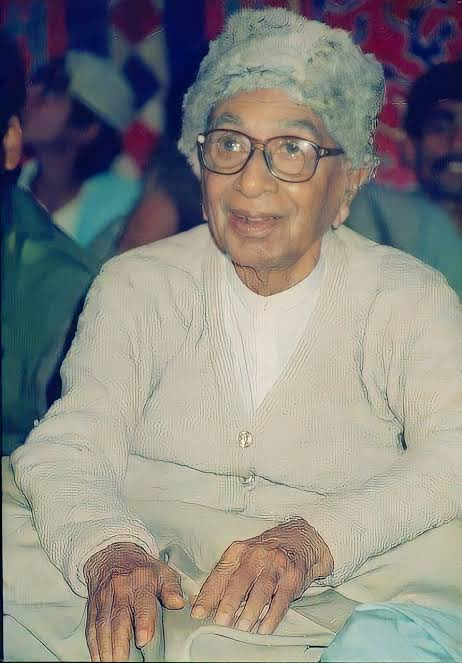
	Majority party	Minority party	Third party
Leader	Pir Ilahi Bux	Muhammad Ayub Khuhro	G. M. Syed
Party	PML	SML	SAM
Last election	28	New	New
Seats won	78	7	7
Seat change	▲50	▲7	▲7
Premier before election
Pir Ilahi Bux
PML
Elected Premier
Pir Ilahi Bux
PML

Provincial elections were held in Sindh province of Pakistan in 1953. The elections, were first attempt at participatory democracy for the young nation, which received its independence six years earlier. It was neither free nor fair.

The election took place in May after several instances of rescheduling and suffered from the same voting irregularities that other states experienced in the 1951 provincial elections. Just five years later, President Iskander Mirza suspended elections, declared martial law, and seized power for twenty days until General Ayub Khan overthrew him in the 1958 coup d'état, the country's first military coup d'état.
