= Miran Mohammad Shah =

Pakistani politician and diplomat

The Sindh Members of the Bombay Legislative Assembly in 1936 before Sindh became an official province. Miran Mohammad Shah stands 4th from the right.

Syed Miran Mohammad Shah [(Sindhi: سيد ميران محمد شاھ), 19 March 1898 - 16 November 1963] was the second speaker of the Sindh Assembly before and after the independence of Pakistan. He was a Sindh member in the Bombay Legislative Assembly before Sindh became a province in 1936. After the accession of Sindh to Pakistan in 1947, he became the first speaker of the Sindh Assembly. He remained speaker of Sindh Legislative Assembly and Minister for the Government of Sindh. Miran Mohammad Shah also served as the first ambassador of Pakistan to Spain.

== Early life ==
Miran Muhammad Shah was born on 19th March 1898 in village Tikhir (ٽکڙ), near Tando Muhammad Khan, Sindh, Pakistan. His father Syed Zain ul Abideen was a physician and poet. He passed Matriculation examination from Sindh Madersatul Islam High School (now University) Karachi, B.A. from DJ College Karachi and LLB from Law College Bombay (now Mumbai).

== Political life ==
Miran Mohammad Shah was an avid member of Sir Shah Nawaz Bhutto's United Party in 1936, while serving under him as Sindh member of the Bombay Legislative Assembly. When the United Party stood in the provincial elections in 1937, Hindu moneylenders and the Indian National Congress spent large amounts of money to secure Bhutto's seat. Never in the history of India had there been such extravagant amounts of campaigning efforts done to secure a single seat. In this moment of likely defeat, Syed Miran Shah was one of the closest allies Bhutto had against his opponent Sheikh Abdul Majid Sindhi. Although the party suffered defeat in the provincial elections, they still managed to accumulate a good number of seats in the provincial assembly. Although Miran Mohammad Shah, along with some other prominent Sindhis including G. M. Syed, Pirzada Abdus Sattar, Pir Ilahi Bux, Allah Bux Soomro and Muhammad Hashim Gazdar expressed full confidence in Bhutto's leadership, Bhutto nevertheless decided to abdicate in favour of Sir Ghulam Hussain Hidayatullah.

=== Relationship with Allama Iqbal ===
So entwined was he in the prospects of the Pakistan Movement that he was at personal terms with the Allama Iqbal. Upon confirmation of his pilgrimage for Hajj in Mecca, he wrote to Iqbal in order to share the news. Iqbal responded with a letter dated 2 December 1937 stating, "Thank God you are well and busy in the preparations for Hajj. May God bless you in this journey. I wish I could accompany you. But alas, for me tile [sic.] days of separation are not over as yet. I am not worthy of being called to the shrine of the Holy Prophet."

== Political lineage ==
Miran Mohammad Shah is the maternal grandfather of Syed Naveed Qamar, the Federal Minister for Petroleum, formerly the Finance Minister of Pakistan.

== Cultural strides ==
As well as being a politician, Miran Mohammad Shah was a prominent Sindhi literary personality. He laid the foundation for the Sindhi Adabi Board (SAB) in order to preserve the culture of Sindh and the Sindhi language along with G.M Syed, Ali Muhammad Rashidi, Agha Badaruddin and several others. After the imposition of martial law by General Ayub Khan and the enforcement of the One Unit, the ruling elite minimised the involvement of writers-cum-politicians and imposed an embargo on the SAB to prevent it from publishing radical literature. Miran Mohammad Shah was amongst the politicians that ceased to function as members thenceforth. The Government of Pakistan has named a road in Karachi after his name to pay homage to him.

== See also ==
- List of members of the 1st Provincial Assembly of Sindh
