= Sind Azad Party =

- Founder: Sheikh Abdul Majid Sindhi
- Founded: August 18, 1932; 92 years ago

The Sind Azad Party was a political party in Sindh, India. The party was founded by Sheikh Abdul Majid Sindhi in Karachi on August 18, 1932.

In the 1937 Sind legislative assembly election, the party won three seats.
