= Muslim Conference =

Muslim Conference may refer to:

- All India Azad Muslim Conference, a coalition of political parties in British India
- All Jammu and Kashmir Muslim Conference, a political party that splintered off of the Jammu & Kashmir National Conference
