= Masjid Manzilgah =

Mosque in Sukkur, Sindh, Pakistan

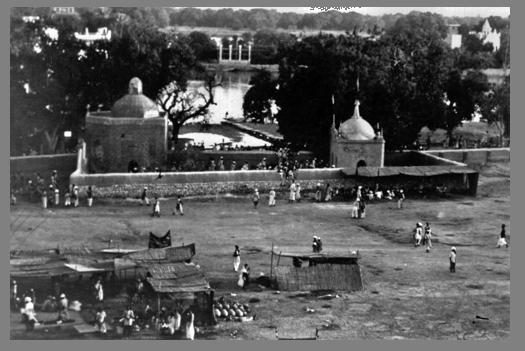
- Manzilgah Mosque at Bundar Road, Indus River

Religion
- Affiliation: Islam
- Ecclesiastical or organizational status: Mosque
- Status: Active

Location
- Location: Sukkur, Sindh
- Country: Pakistan
- Interactive map of Masjid Manzilgah

Architecture
- Type: Mosque
- Style: Islamic architecture
- Completed: 1598

Masjid Manzilgah (lit. Manzilgah Mosque) is a historic structure located in Sukkur, Sindh. It was built by Syed Masoom Shah, the provincial governor, in 1598.

== History ==
Masjid Manzilgah was built in 1598 by Syed Masoom Shah. Initially, the site was part of a larger complex designed to serve trade caravans and included both an inn and the mosque, each featuring ornate domes. The complex, known for its ornamental domes, served both religious and practical purposes. The adjacent Menara of Masoom Shah was also a significant historical structure. The British, after their conquest of Sindh in 1843, repurposed the buildings for governmental use before eventually abandoning them, leading to their deterioration over time. Directly opposite the mosque was Sadh Belo, an island where a Hindu temple was established in the 1820s by Nepalese sadhu Baba Bankhandi Maharaj, thus becoming a significant religious site for the local Hindu community.

The Manzilgah communal riots of 1939 had their roots in a dispute over the mosque's condition and ownership. The local Muslim population sought the mosque's restoration, citing its historical and religious significance. Conversely, the Hindu community raised concerns regarding the mosque's proximity to their temple. The British authorities maintained a neutral stance, keeping the site under government control.

The political landscape shifted when Sindh became an autonomous province in 1936 under British rule. The Sindh Assembly elections in 1937 resulted in a Muslim-majority government, leading to renewed demands for the mosque's restoration. The Hindu community, influential in the assembly due to its economic and educational advantages, opposed these demands.

Successive governments, first under Sir Ghulam Hussain Hidayatullah and then Khan Bahadur Allah Bakhsh Soomro, faced continuous pressure to address the mosque issue. In 1939, following a meeting with the Jamiat Ulema-i-Sindh the regional.branch of the Jamiat Ulema-e-Hind, expectations were raised among the Muslim community regarding the mosque's return, which met with strong resistance from the Hindu community. The situation escalated into large-scale peaceful protests, adopting the 'Satyagraha' approach of nonviolent resistance. Despite arrests, the administration allowed protesters to remain near the mosque, which intensified opposition from the Hindu community.

A critical turning point occurred during a Hindu Mahasabha conference in Sukkur, where B.S. Moonje's presence led to demands for the removal of Muslims from the mosque. The government's subsequent forceful eviction sparked widespread communal violence across Sindh, resulting in numerous casualties and property damage.

In the aftermath, the political stability in the region was severely impacted, leading to the eventual fall of the Soomro government. The events surrounding Masjid Manzilgah significantly influenced the Muslim community's perception of their position in Sindh and contributed to the broader movement for a separate Muslim homeland, eventually leading to the creation of Pakistan.
