= Gosar =

Gosar is a surname of Slovenian origin. Notable people with the surname include:

- Andrej Gosar (1887–1970), Slovenian and Yugoslav politician, economist and sociologist
- Paul Gosar (born 1958), American politician and dentist from Arizona
- Pete Gosar (born 1967), American politician and aviator, brother of Paul

== See also ==
- Gozar, Iran, a village
- Gazdar, Iran, a village also known as Gozar
- Gozer, the supernatural villain of the film Ghostbusters
