= Abdul Qaiyum Ansari =

Indian independence activist

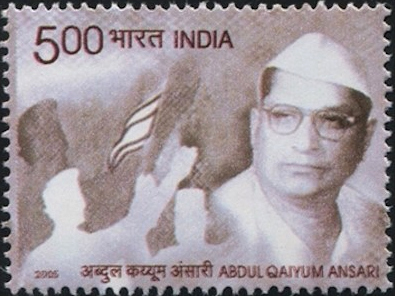
- Born: 1 July 1905; Dehri-on-Sone, Bengal Presidency
- Died: 18 January 1973 (age 67); Amiawar, Bihar
- Organization: All India Momin Conference
- Movement: Indian independence movement

Abdul Qaiyum Ansari (1 July 1905 – 18 January 1973) was a participant in the freedom struggle of India. He was known for his commitment to national integration, secularism, and communal harmony. He was a leader who worked against the demand of the Muslim League for creation of a separate Muslim nation from India as an independent state. Mr. Ansari fought against Jinnah's two nation theory through All India Momin Conference of which he was the President.

== Birth and education ==
He was born on 1 July 1905 at Dehri-on-Sone, Bihar. He was born in a wealthy Momin/Ansari family. After studying at Sasaram and Dehri-on-Sone High Schools, he went on to attend Aligarh Muslim University, Calcutta University, and Allahabad University, though his education was interrupted from time to time due to his active involvement in the struggle for India's freedom.

== Participation in freedom struggle of India and pre-independence period works ==
He was involved in the freedom struggle of India at a very early age and as a part of the same he left the government run school at his home town. He established a national school for the students who had boycotted government schools in response to the call of the Indian National Congress. For this he was arrested and imprisoned at the young age of 16 since it amounted to participation in Non-Cooperation and Khilafat Movements.

He worked closely with the Indian National Congress throughout as a youth leader and even took part in the students' agitation against the Simon Commission during its visit to Calcutta in 1928.

Abdul Qaiyum Ansari was also an accomplished journalist, writer and poet. He was editor of Urdu weekly "Al-Islah" (The Reform) and an Urdu monthly "Musawat" (Equality) in the preindependence days.

== Opposition to Muslim League and formation of Momin Movement ==
He opposed the communal policies of the Muslim League. Abdul Ansari was against the demand of Muslim League for creation of Pakistan by dividing India. To counter the demand of the Muslim League for a separate Muslim nation he started the Momin Movement. Under this banner he worked for the social, political, and also economic emancipation and upliftment of the backward Momin community which was at least half of India's Muslim population then. Abdul Qaiyum Ansari remained President of All India Momin Conference throughout his life.

Momin movement supported the Indian National Congress Party which he perceived to be fighting for freedom for a united India, and for the establishment and development of social equality, secularism, and democracy. He also worked for the welfare of artisan and weaver's communities, and for the development of the handloom sector in the textile industry of the country.

His party fought the general elections of 1946 held on the basis of separate electorates and managed to win six seats in the Bihar Provincial Assembly against the Muslim League. Thus he became the first Momin to become a Minister of Bihar in the cabinet of Bihar Kesari Sri Krishna Singh and as a young minister earned the praise of both stalwarts Bihar Kesari Shri Babu and Bihar Vibhuti Anugraha Babu. Eventually he dissolved the Momin Conference as a political body, and made it a social and economic organization. He was a Minister in the Bihar Cabinet for about seventeen years and held various important portfolios and discharged his responsibilities most ably, building up a reputation for selfless service and integrity.

== Post-independence efforts ==
During the India–Pakistan war fought over the control of Kashmir, he came forward in October 1947 as the first Muslim leader of India to condemn the war and strenuously worked to rouse the Muslim masses to counter such an event as aggression as true citizens of India. As an aftermath of this he founded the Indian Muslim Youth Kashmir Front in 1957 to "liberate" Azad Kashmir. Also, he exhorted the Indian Muslims to support the Government of India in the anti-Indian uprising of the Razakars in Hyderabad during September 1948.

A champion of the poor and downtrodden, Abdul Qaiyum Ansari worked for the spread of education and literacy, and the first All India Backward Classes Commission was appointed by the Government of India in 1953 largely due to Mr. Ansari's initiative.

== Death ==
Abdul Qaiyum Ansari died on 18 January 1973, at village Amiawar of Bihar, while inspecting damages caused to the village by the collapse of the Dehri-Arrah canal and organizing relief to its homeless people.

== Legacy ==
On 1 July 2005, the Government of India released a postage stamp to commemorate him.
