= All India Azad Muslim Conference =

Muslim Indian nationalist organisation

The All India Azad Muslim Conference (Urdu: آل انڈیا آزاد مسلم کانفرنس), commonly called the Azad Muslim Conference (literally, "Independent Muslim Conference"), was an organisation of nationalist Muslims in India. Its purpose was advocacy for composite nationalism and a united India, thus opposing the partition of India as well as its underlying two-nation theory put forward by the pro-separatist All-India Muslim League. The conference included representatives from various political parties and organizations such as Jamiat Ulema-e-Hind, Majlis-e-Ahrar-ul-Islam, All India Momin Conference, All India Shia Political Conference, Khudai Khidmatgar, Krishak Praja Party, Anjuman-i-Watan Baluchistan, All India Muslim Majlis, and Jamiat Ahl-i-Hadis. The Canadian orientalist Wilfred Cantwell Smith felt that the attendees at the Delhi session in 1940 represented the "majority of India's Muslims". The Bombay Chronicle documented on 18 April 1946 that "The attendance at the Nationalist meeting was about five times than the attendance at the League meeting."

== History ==
The Azad Muslim Conference was established in 1929 by Allah Bakhsh Soomro, a later Chief Minister of Sindh, who had founded the Sind Ittehad Party (Sind United Party) a few years before. In the 20th century, many Muslims in British India "ferociously opposed the Muslim League’s demand for Pakistan". Allah Bakhsh Soomro stated:

Whatever our faiths we must live together in our country in an atmosphere of perfect amity and our relations should be the relations of the several brothers of a joint family, various members of which are free to profess their faith as they like without any let or hindrance and of whom enjoy equal benefits of their joint property.

In the session of the Azad Muslim Conference held in Delhi, from 27 April to 30 April, over 1400 nationalist Muslim delegates participated. Allah Baksh Soomro, the leader of the conference, stated "No power on earth can rob anyone of his faith and convictions, and no power on earth shall be permitted to rob Indian Muslims of their just rights as Indian nationals." The participants primarily belonged to the working class of Muslims in British India, unlike the All India Muslim League, whose membership was largely composed of the elite. The Bombay Chronicle documented on 18 April 1946 that "The attendance at the Nationalist meeting was about five times than the attendance at the League meeting." The Canadian orientalist Wilfred Cantwell Smith likewise stated that he felt the attendees represented the "majority of India's Muslims", as did the British press.

Meetings of the Azad Muslim Conference were frequent in the 1940s, especially in 1942, and continued in several cities, which worried the rival Muslim League. From 27 December 1947 to 28 December 1947, the Azad Muslim Conference was convened in Lucknow by Hafiz Mohamad Ibrahim and Maulana Abul Kalam Azad. This meeting was also supported by leaders like Zahid bin Maulana Shaukat Ali of Khilafat Andolan.

The Azad Muslim Conference concluded that the creation of Pakistan would be "impracticable and harmful to the country’s interest generally, and of Muslims in particular." It called on Indian Muslims to work with Indians of other faiths to gain Indian independence from British rule. Jawaharlal Nehru praised the Azad Muslim Conference as "very representative and very successful". The Azad Muslim Conference had support from the Deobandi school of Islam and their Jamiat Ulema-e-Hind.

The All India Azad Muslim Conference, despite its political strength, was sidelined by British officials, who referred to the organisation as "so-called" in their correspondences. Victor Hope, 2nd Marquess of Linlithgow, had referred to the organisation as "stage managed" in 1942 and eventually, the British were only willing to recognize the pro-separatist All India Muslim League as being the sole representative of Indian Muslims—a development that led to the partition of India.

== Member parties ==
- Sind Ittehad Party
- Jamiat Ulema-e-Hind
- Majlis-e-Ahrar-ul-Islam
- All India Momin Conference
- All India Shia Political Conference
- Khudai Khidmatgar
- Krishak Praja Party
- Anjuman-i-Watan Baluchistan
- All India Muslim Majlis
- Jamiat Ahl-i-Hadees
- Assam Valley Party
- Unionist Party
- All India Sunni Jamiyyathul Ulema/All India Sunni Conference (left in 1946)
- Muslim Independent Party

== Slogans and events ==
The Azad Muslim Conference used several slogans, among them being: "Inquilab Zindabad", "Hindustan Azad", "Pakistan Murdabad", "Freedom through National Unity", and "We are Indian and India is our Home".

On 19 April 1940, the Azad Muslim Conference celebrated "Hindustan Day", in contrast to the pro-separatist Muslim League's "Pakistan Day".

== See also ==
- Opposition to the partition of India
- All-India Jamhur Muslim League
- Composite Nationalism and Islam
- Akhand Hindustan
