= Rahim Bux Soomro =

Pakistani politician

Personal details
- Born: September 1918 Ghotki
- Died: 24 January 2005 (aged 91) Karachi
- Spouse: Huzoor Begum
- Children: Mian Allah Bakhsh Soomro Nasreen Soomro Shaheen Soomro Naila Soomro Hamir Soomro
- Parent: Allah Bux Soomro (father)

Rahim Bux Soomro (September, 1918 – 24 January 2005) was a politician in Sindh, Pakistan. He was born in September 1918 to Allah Bux Soomro, who later became a minister of Sindh multiple times.
