= Anwar Hussain Hidayatullah =

Pakistani politician and diplomat

Anwar Hussain Hidayatullah was a Pakistani politician and diplomat.

== Biography ==
Hidayatullah was born to Ghulam Hussain Hidayatullah, a Chief Minister of Sindh. He was married with Doulat Haroon Hidayatullah, a daughter of Abdullah Haroon.

Hidayatullah served as an ambassador of Pakistan to Brazil, Morocco and Tunisia. He was also a member of the Provincial Assembly of Sindh. He also served as a vice president of Karachi City Cricket Association (KCCA).
