= Hassaram Sunderdas Pamnani =

Pakistani politician (1926–2024)

Hassaran Sunderdas Pamnani
- ھاسارام سندرداس پمناڻي

Member, Provincial Assembly of Sindh
- In office 1937–1945

Personal details
- Born: 10 April 1887 Rohri, Bombay Presidency, British India (now Pakistan)
- Died: 17 July 1940 (aged 53) Rohri, Sindh, British India
- Party: Indian National Congress
- Education: Fergusson College, Pune

Hassaram Sunderdas Pamnani (10 April 1887 – 17 July 1940) was a Sindhi educationist, social reformer, politician, and freedom fighter during the British Raj. He served as the principal of the Teachers Training College in Hyderabad, Sindh and was elected as a member of the Sindh Legislative Assembly in 1937.

Pamnani was actively involved in the Indian freedom movement and was a prominent local leader of the Indian National Congress.

== Early life and education ==
Hassaram Sunderdas Pamnani was born on 10 April 1887 in Rohri, a town in the Sukkur District of Sindh, into a well-off Sindhi Hindu family. He received his early education in his hometown and passed the matriculation examination in 1906.

He moved to Baroda (now Vadodara) for higher studies, where he became involved in the Indian freedom movement against British rule. After a year of college education, he transferred to Fergusson College, Pune, where he earned a Bachelor of Arts degree in Philosophy.

== Social and religious activities ==
After completing his education, Pamnani returned to his hometown and devoted himself to social reform and community service in Sindh. He founded the Swami Dharmdas Seva Mandli in Rohri, a socio-religious organization.

The organization established branches in several areas in Sindh, including Jacobabad, Obaoro, Shikarpur, and Tando Muhammad Khan. Pamnani worked to assist the underprivileged and to promote social and religious awareness among the local population. He also launched publications on social and religious topics, such as Sat Sangat Vilas and Dharam Darshan.

Pamnani established the Tilak High School and the Tilak Cotton Factory in Hyderabad. He was also actively involved in humanitarian efforts; during the severe floods of the Indus River in 1927 and 1931, he provided relief to affected communities by arranging food, clothing, and shelter.

== Professional and political career ==
Pamnani began his professional career in the revenue department but soon left the service to join the education sector as a teacher. After serving in various schools, he became a principal at the Teachers Training College in Hyderabad.

In the later part of his life, he resigned from government service to devote himself fully to the Indian freedom movement against British rule. As a result of the freedom movement, he was imprisoned for over a year.

Following the separation of Sindh from the Bombay Presidency in 1936, Pamnani entered electoral politics and was elected as a member of the Sindh Provincial Assembly in 1937.

== Assassination ==
In 1939, communal tensions arose in Sukkur over the Manzilgah issue, leading to Hindu–Muslim unrest. During this period, the prominent figure Bhagat Kanwar Ram was assassinated. Pamnani raised the matter in the Sindh Legislative Assembly and delivered a speech, after which he reportedly began receiving threats.

On 17 July 1940, while returning from Mirpur Mathelo, he disembarked at Rohri railway station and was on his way to his residence when he was shot dead in broad daylight. It is reported that the assailant was the same individual who had earlier been involved in the killing of Bhagat Kanwar Ram. His funeral procession was held the following day, 18 July 1940, and was attended by thousands of people. A public meeting was also held the same evening to mourn his death. At the time of his assassination, Pamnani was 52 years old.
