= Salaat (caste) =

Hindu caste found in Gujjarat, India

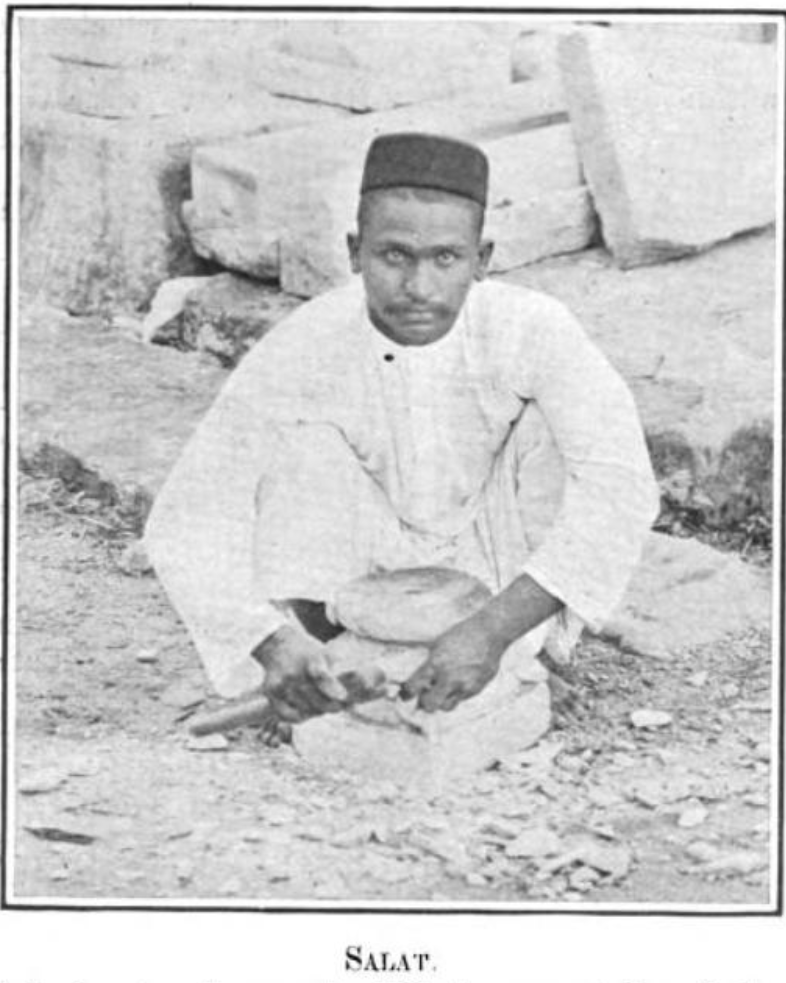
A photograph of a Salat man, early 20th century.

The Salat are Hindu caste found in the state of Gujarat in India.

== History and origin ==
The word Salat has been derived from Salaya which means stone. They are a community of stone cutters. The community is concentrated in Banaskantha, Sabarkantha and Mehasana districts, and they speak Gujarati. A small number of Salaat were converted to Islam and now form a distinct community of Muslim Salaat.

== Present circumstances ==
The two divisions are divided into a number of clans, the main ones being the Rathore, Parmar, Solanki and Bijpar, which are exogamous. Their main occupation remains the selling and manufacture of grinding stones.

== See also ==
- Muslim Salaat
- Sompura Salat
