= Yusuf Haroon =

Pakistani politician (1916–2011)

Yusuf Abdullah Haroon

5th Governor of West Pakistan
- In office March 1969 – September 1969
- Preceded by: Muhammad Musa
- Succeeded by: Malik Nur Khan

3rd Chief Minister of Sindh
- In office 18 February 1949 – 7 May 1950
- Governors General: Muhammad Ali Jinnah; Khawaja Nazimuddin
- Preceded by: Pir Ilahi Bux
- Succeeded by: Qazi Fazlullah Ubaidullah

Personal details
- Born: 1916
- Died: 12 February 2011 (aged 95) New York City, United States
- Party: Muslim League
- Spouse: Pasha Haroon
- Parent: Abdullah Haroon (father)
- Relatives: Mahmoud Haroon (brother)

Muhammad Yusuf Abdullah Haroon (1916 – 12 February 2011) was a Pakistani businessman and politician who served as the 5th Governor of West Pakistan and 3rd Chief Minister of Sindh.

== Early life and family ==
Born in 1916 to Abdullah Haroon, Yusuf worked closely with Quaid-e-Azam Muhammad Ali Jinnah as his personal assistant and was active in the Pakistan Movement. He was a witness to All-India Muslim League's 25th session in Allahabad in 1930.

Yusuf married Pasha Haroon, the niece of Aga Khan III who was the 48th Imam of the Ismaili Shias, in 1937.

== Career ==
Yusuf was active in politics spanning nearly seven decades.

From 10 May 1944 to 8 May 1945, he served as mayor of pre-independence Karachi. After independence, he served as Chief Minister of Sindh between 1949–50, where he piloted a bill for land reform to abolish large land-holdings. When the bill failed to pass, he resigned from his position as chief minister. In 1969, Haroon served as governor of West Pakistan in 1969.

Yusuf also served as a federal minister and as a high commissioner to Australia. In 1966, he worked briefly as chief editor for Dawn, a daily newspaper. After moving to New York, he served as an executive of the now-defunct Pan Am Airlines before retiring.

=== Dawn ===
Yusuf Haroon was a founding member of Dawn. In 1946, when Yusuf was in New Delhi to attend a constituent assembly session, Jinnah called him to his residence and asked him to discontinue the newspaper The Herald, then edited by Desmond Young, and instead start the publication of Dawn in Karachi, Pakistan, the soon-to-be independent nation, even though Dawn’s Delhi edition would continue to be published. Jinnah also asked him and his family to buy all the shares of the new newspaper company.

He became the chief editor of the Dawn newspaper in April 1966 after the long time editor Altaf Husain decided to join the cabinet of President of Pakistan, Field Marshal Ayub Khan in March 1965. Altaf Husain had been hand-picked by Jinnah to be the editor of Dawn, Delhi before 1947. He was also elected the president of the All Pakistan Newspapers Society of Pakistan for the term 1966–67. Yusuf Haroon's independent-looking outlook annoyed the next President of Pakistan General Yahya Khan and he had to leave Pakistan in a hurry to avoid arrest in 1969. He later decided to settle in New York and remained there after the Yahya Khan government fell in December 1971. He provided financial support to Sheikh Mujibur Rahman, the future President of Bangladesh, who was employed at an insurance company owned by Haroon.

== Death ==
Yusuf Haroon died on 12 February 2011, after a protracted illness, at the age of 95 in New York.

His funeral was attended by the former Pakistani prime minister Mir Zafarullah Khan Jamali, former Sindh governors Kamal Azfar and Moinuddin Haider, former speaker of National Assembly of Pakistan Illahi Bukhsh Soomro and the veteran politician Sherbaz Khan Mazari.

Political offices
Preceded by Shambo Nath Molraaj	Mayor of Karachi; 1944–1945	Succeeded by Manuel Misquita
Preceded by Pir Ilahi Bux	Chief Minister of Sindh; 1949–1950	Succeeded by Qazi Fazlullah Ubaidullah
Preceded by Muhammad Musa	Governor of West Pakistan; 1969	Succeeded by Malik Nur Khan
