= Narayan Pura =

Narayan Pura نارائن پورہ
- Neighbourhood
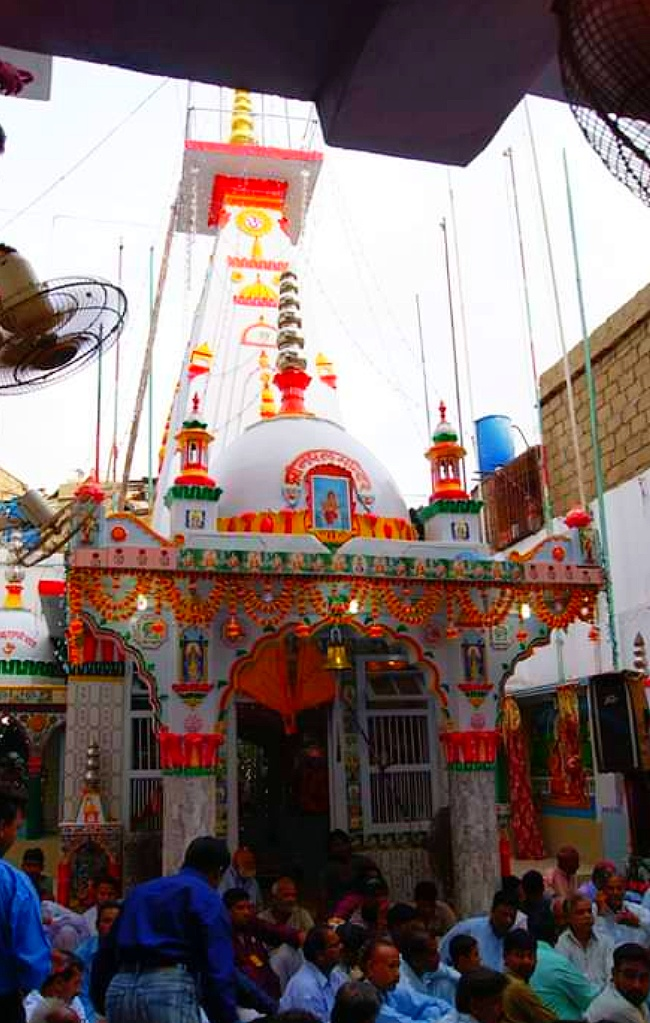
- Shri Nawal Mandir in Narayanpura
- Country: Pakistan
- Province: Sindh
- City: Karachi

Narayan Pura (Urdu: نارائن پورہ), sometimes spelled Narayanpura, is a Hindu-dominated working-class locality in the Ranchore Line neighbourhood in central Karachi, near the Dr. Ruth K. M. Pfau Civil Hospital. It has an estimated population of 10,000, and is centred around Kalu Umaji Road. It contains several Hindu temples, churches and the Sikh "Gurdwara Guru Garanth Sahib Sikh Sabha" temple, which was renovated in 2014, and serves the neighbourhood's 2,500 Sikhs. Narayan Pura has been called a haven for minority religious groups in Karachi,

== History ==
The neighbourhood was established in 1824 by an activist named Narayandas. It was targeted by rioters in 1992 in retaliation for the destruction of the 500 year old Babri Mosque.

== Place of worship ==
=== Churches ===
Park Methodist Church

=== Hindu Temples ===
Jog Maya Mandir

Hinglaj Mata Mandir

Manohar Temple

Ram Dev Gujarati Mandir

Shri Jai Veer Hanuman Mandir

Shri Naval Mandir

=== Sikh Gurdwara ===
Gurdwara Guru Granth Sahib Sikh Sabha
