= Mukhi Gobindram Pritamdas =

Indian politician

Mukhi Gobindram Pritamdas was an Indian merchant and politician from Hyderabad, Sindh (present-day Sindh, Pakistan). He won a seat from Upper Sindh, Frontier District in the Sind legislative assembly in the 1937 election. Before being elected to the legislative assembly, he had been a member of the Hyderabad Municipal Council for fifteen years. He had also presided over various social welfare organisations.

Gobindram was the leader of the Sind Hindu Mahasabha in the legislative assembly. After the election, he was sworn in as a minister in the cabinet of Ghulam Hussain Hidayatullah.

He again represented Upper Sindh, Frontier District in the 1946 Sind legislative assembly (which functioned between March and September 1946).
