= Ranchore Line, Karachi =

Ranchore Line Saddar Town
- Neighbourhood
- Gazdarabad
- Country: Pakistan
- City: Karachi
- District: Karachi South
- Time zone: UTC+5 (PKT)
- Postal code: 75300

Ranchore Line (Urdu: رنچھور لائن), officially named as Gazdarabad (Urdu: گزدر آباد), is a neighbourhood in the Saddar Town of Karachi South district of Karachi Pakistan, and part of PS-108 constituency. The neighborhood is one of the oldest in Karachi. It has a predominantly Muslim Marwaris population who hailed from Jaisalmer in Rajasthan from 19th century. Gazadarabad is also home to Karachi's largest Hindu-dominated neighborhood, Narayan Pura.

== History ==
Gazdarabad was formerly called Ranchore Line until around the 1950s. The name of the area was associated with a Hindu named Ranchor. The area was first built in the early days of the British Raj. With time, it became one of the most densely populated areas in the city. Before the independence of Pakistan, the area was home to a majority of Hindus.

After the independence of Pakistan, the Karachi population increased dramatically when hundreds of thousands of Muslim migrants(Muhajirs) from India moved to Pakistan and settled in the city. The minority Hindus and Sikhs migrated to India while many Muslims migrants from India settled in the Karachi. There was previously a local Jewish community including the former Magain Shalome Synagogue.

The name was changed in the honour of Muhammad Hashim Gazdar, who belonged to the Muslim Marwaris community and resided in the locality. Mr. Gazdar had been Mayor of Karachi and one time deputy speaker of the Constitutional Assembly. Gazdarabad is home of Muslim Marwari Community who migrated from Jaisalmer in Rajasthan at and around the beginning of British Raj. These people perfected the art of yellow stone masonry. Their artistic skills can be seen in all the British era buildings in Karachi.

== See also ==
- Silawat
- Muhammad Hashim Gazdar
