= Mir Bandeh Ali Khan Talpur =

Pakistani politician

3rd Premier of Sindh
- In office 14 April 1940 – 7 March 1941
- Governor: Lancelot Graham
- Preceded by: Allah Bux Soomro
- Succeeded by: Allah Bux Soomro

Mir Bandeh Ali Khan Talpur (Urdu: میر بندہ علی خان تالپور) was a politician from Sindh, Pakistan.

Mir Bandeh Ali Khan Talpur was member of first provincial assembly of sindh and Chief Minister of Sindh from 14 April 1940 to 7 March 1941.

Political offices
Preceded by Khan Bahadur Allah Bux Soomro	Chief Minister of Sindh; 14 April 1940 - 7 March 1941	Succeeded by Khan Bahadur Allah Bux Soomro
