= Fatima Sughra Begum =

Pakistan Movement activist

Fatima Sughra Begum (born 1931/1932, Walled City, Lahore – died 25 September 2017), garnered fame as a teenager, when at age 14 in 1947, she ripped down the Union Jack from the Shikarpur, Sindh Civil Secretariat and replaced it with the All-India Muslim League flag.

According to her own account, "When I took down the British flag and replaced it with our Muslim League one, I don't think I really knew what I was doing. It wasn't planned. I was rebellious at that age, 14, and it seemed like a good idea. I was not prepared for it to become such a big symbol of independence. They even gave me a Gold Medal for Services to Pakistan. I was the first ever to receive one." (The Guardian, 2007).

She received a gold medal in 1987 and a Life Achievement Award, from, respectively, the Pakistan Movement Workers Trust (for "Services to Pakistan") and the Government of pakistan.

== Death ==
Fatima Sughra Begum died on 25 September 2017 and was laid to rest at Miani Sahib graveyard in her native Lahore.

== Conflation ==
Due to the similarity of her name to that of Sughra Begum, Lady Hidayatullah (also known as Begum Ghulam Hussain Hidayatullah, Begum Hidayatullah, and Lady Hidayatullah),—the wife of diplomat and activist Sir Ghulam Hussain Hidayatullah, a prominent Sindhi political leader—the latter woman (born 1904), who was almost thirty years older than Fatima, and presumably present at the same event, was conflated in certain elements of the media as the author of the Union Jack removal from the Civil Secretariat Lahore in 1947.
