= Qazi Fazlullah Ubaidullah =

Pakistani politician

Qazi Fazal Ullah

4th Chief Minister of Sindh
- In office 8 May 1950 – 24 March 1951
- Governor‑General: Khawaja Nazimuddin
- Preceded by: Yusuf Haroon
- Succeeded by: Muhammad Ayub Khuhro

Qazi Fazal Ullah (Urdu: قاضی فضل الله عبيد الله) was a politician from Sindh, Pakistan.

Qazi Fazal Ullah was Chief Minister of Sindh from 8 May 1950 to 24 March 1951.

Political offices
Preceded by Yusuf Haroon	Chief Minister of Sindh; 1950 – 1951	Succeeded by Muhammad Ayub Khuhro
