= Kaevan Gazdar =

Indian-German journalist and academic (born 1951)

Kaevan Gazdar (born 1951) is a journalist and lecturer writing about economic and socio-economic issues.

Gazdar studied economics and social sciences in Munich, Bologna and Paris.

== Career ==
He works as a journalist and lecturer. He worked as a project manager at HVB Group, a management consultancy. Gazdar is a senior research fellow of the Center for Corporate Citizenship in Ingolstadt. He published in German and English, both articles and books, and mostly on economic and socio-economic issues; journals in which his articles appeared include Ethical Corporation and IR magazine. He has held seminars and talks at various venues including Management Centre Europe (Brussels), FT Knowledge (London) and IIR (London and Zurich).

== Juries ==
- Annual Report on Annual Reports (e.com, Belgium)
- Good Company Ranking (Manager Magazine, Deloitte, Germany)
- Jahrbuch der Unternehmenskommunikation (Econ Verlag and Handelsblatt, Germany)

== Books ==
- Informationsmanagement für Führungskräfte. Konkrete Perspektiven für Wirtschaft, Verwaltung und Politik. Frankfurt am Main: Frankfurter Allgemeine Zeitung 1989.
- Die Chancen der Informationstechnik. Über die Informationsverarbeitung. Stuttgart: IBM Deutschland 1991 (edited).
- Köpfe jagen. Mythos und Realität der Personalberatung. Wiesbaden: Gabler 1992 (edited).
- High-Tech-Handbuch. Praxis, Märkte und Zukunft neuer Technologien. Bonn: Economica Verlag 1992 (edited).
- Germany's balanced development. The real wealth of a nation. Westport, Conn. etc.: Quorum Books 1998.
- Geschäftsbericht ohne Fehl und Tadel. Sprache, Gestaltung und Botschaft erfolgreicher Finanzkommunikation. Neuwied etc.: Luchterhand 1999, 2nd edition 2001 (with Klaus Rainer Kirchhoff).
- Unternehmerische Wohltaten – Last oder Lust? Von Stakeholder Value, Corporate Citizenship und Sustainable Development bis Sponsoring. München etc.: Luchterhand 2004 (with Klaus Rainer Kirchhoff).
- Erfolgsfaktor Verantwortung. Corporate Social Responsibility professionell manager. Berlin etc.: Springer-Verlag 2006 (edited with André Habisch, Klaus Rainer Kirchhoff and Sam Vaseghi).
- Herrscher im Paradies. Fürst Franz und das Gartenreich Dessau-Wörlitz. Berlin: Aufbau-Verlag 2006.
- Reporting nonfinancials. Chichester etc.: John Wiley and Sons 2007.
- Zwischen Dichtern und Denkern, Richtern und Henkern. Auf der Suche nach deutscher Identität: Olzog 2010.

== Recorded speeches ==
- Helmut Schmidt – ein deutscher Staatsmann. Redebilanz. Henstedt-Ulzburg: Extra Records & Tapes Böhnke 1988.
- Reden, die Deutschland bewegten. 40 Jahre Bundesrepublik Deutschland. Redebilanz. Henstedt-Ulzburg: Extra Records & Tapes Böhnke 1989.
- Reden in bewegten Zeiten. Deutschland 1919–1949. Redebilanz. Diepholz: Deutsche Austrophon 1990.
- Helmut Schmidt – ein deutscher Staatsmann. Die Reden. Henstedt-Ulzburg: Extra Records & Tapes Böhnke 2002.
