= Silawat =

Khatik community in India and South Asia

Regions with significant populations
- India; Pakistan

Languages
- Urdu; Hindi; Marwari; Sindhi

Religion
- Islam

Related ethnic groups
- Salaat; Sayyids of Rajasthan; [[Khumra, Khatai, Sufi] (Islam)|Khumra]]

The Silawat, also known as Sangtarash (both lit. 'stonemason'), are a Muslim community from Marwar region of the state of Rajasthan in India. They are also present in the province of Sindh in Pakistan, in the cities of Karachi and Hyderabad, where they have different castes as well.

== Distribution ==
In Sindh, the Silawat are concentrated in the cities of Karachi and Hyderabad. Hyderabad is a particular stronghold of this community. Muhammad Hashim Gazdar, a former mayor of Karachi belonged to the Silawat community.
