= Sindh Muslim League =

Sindh Muslim League Urdu: سندھ مسلم لیگ Sindhi: سنڌ مسلم ليگ
- Abbreviation: SML
- Leader: Muhammad Ayub Khuhro
- Founder: Abdullah Haroon and Bahadur Yar Jung Muhammad Ayub Khuhro (1952)
- Founded: 1938 (Initial) 1952 (Post-Independence)
- Dissolved: 1947 (Before Independence) 1954 (Post-Independence)
- Split from: Muslim League
- Preceded by: Muslim League
- Headquarters: Sindh
- Colors: Green

The Sindh Muslim League was an integral pre-independence faction of the All-India Muslim League and later, in the post-independence period, a breakaway faction of the Muslim League led by Muhammad Ayub Khuhro, which existed from 1952 to 1954.

== History ==
The Sindh Muslim League was conceptualized by Abdullah Haroon and Bahadur Yar Jung, but initially lacked support. But by 1938, it managed to secure seats in the newly established Sind Legislative Assembly under the leadership of Ghulam Hussain Hidayatullah by forming alliances with powerful feudal lords and Pirs. At the time of independence, it merged with the All-India Muslim League and later became a part of the Muslim League.

After independence, Ayub Khuhro was the first Chief Minister of Sindh in Pakistan. He also headed Muslim League in the Sindh province. In 1952, severe in-fighting between Ayub Khuhro and some other Muslim League leaders in Sindh saw the central Muslim League leadership asking Khuhro to step down. He quit the party and re-established the League.

== Dissolution ==
The league was dissolved in 1954.
