= Sind United Party =

Defunct Political party in British India

The Sind United Party or Sind Ittehad Party (Sindhi: سنڌ اتحاد پارٽي) was a political party in Sind, British India. The party was founded in June 1936, the same year that the Sind province had been created. The party was modelled on the Punjab Unionist Party. In the 1937 election to the Sind Legislative Assembly, the party emerged as the largest party with 21 seats in the Assembly and formed a provincial government.

The party had as its explicit purpose to foster communal harmony between Hindus and Muslims. Haji Abdullah Haroon was a co-founder and leader of the party. Shah Nawaz Bhutto was the vice chairman of the party. G. M. Syed had also taken part in the founding of the party. The party counted on the support of waderas (large-scale land-owners), such as Allah Bux Soomro and Yar Muhammad Junejo. The Sind Ittehad Party opposed the partition of India. Bux stated:

Whatever our faiths we must live together in our country in an atmosphere of perfect amity and our relations should be the relations of the several brothers of a joint family, various members of which are free to profess their faith as they like without any let or hindrance and of whom enjoy equal benefits of their joint property.

In the 1937 election to the Sind Legislative Assembly, the Sind United Party emerged as the largest party with 21 seats (out of 34 Muslim seats) in the Assembly. But although the party had sought to build links with the Hindu community, no Hindu contested the elections as a candidate of the party. Moreover, none of the prominent leaders of the party (Haroon and Bhutto) were elected and the Governor of Sind offered the Sind Muslim Political Party to form a government instead. After this move, the Sind United Party suffered a major defection with most of its Assembly members leaving the party.

Allah Bux Soomro later served as Premier of Sindh from 23 March 1938 – 18 April 1940 until a no-confidence motion was passed against him by the Indian National Congress and Muslim League. He was briefly elected back to power and served briefly from 27 March 1942 – 14 October 1942, but was dismissed by the Governor due to his support for the Quit India Movement.

== See also ==
- Sindh United Party
