= All India Momin Conference =

Political party

The All India Momin Conference (Urdu: آل انڈیا مومن کانفرنس), commonly abbreviated as Momin Conference and also known as Jamaat-ul-Ansar (Urdu: جماعت الانصار), was a political party that was founded in India in 1911. It was formed to articulate the interests of the Momin Ansari community. It was founded by Ali Hussain Aasim Bihari.

In particular, the All India Momin Conference "aimed to revive the traditional crafts of weavers, promote self-respect and devout religious conduct among the weavers and restore their independent status."

The Momin Conference "saw itself as articulating the interests of ordinary Muslims" as opposed to the "Muslim League, the latter being perceived a party of elite Muslims". In 1940, the All India Momin Conference passed a resolution in Patna that opposed the partition of India. It said: "the Partition scheme was not only impracticable and unpatriotic but altogether un-Islamic and unnatural, because the geographical position of the different provinces of India and the intermingled population of the Hindus and Muslims are against the proposal and because the two communities have been living together for centuries, and they have many things in common between them."

The All India Momin Conference was a member at the All India Azad Muslim Conference, which opposed the creation of Pakistan.

In 1941, a CID report states that thousands of Muslim weavers under the banner of Momin Conference and coming from Bihar and Eastern U.P. descended in Delhi demonstrating against the proposed two-nation theory. A gathering of more than fifty thousand people from an unorganized sector was not usual at that time, so its importance should be duly recognized. The non-ashraf Muslims constituting a majority of Indian Muslims were opposed to partition but sadly they were not heard. They were firm believers of Islam yet they were opposed to Pakistan.

== See also ==
- All India Azad Muslim Conference
