= Salaat (Muslim) =

Muslim community in Gujjarat India

The Salaat Muslims are a Muslim community found in the state of Gujarat in India. They are converts from the Hindu Salaat caste.
