= Allah Bux Soomro =

Sindhi politician and social worker

Khan Bahadur Allah Bux Soomro OBE
- اللهَ بخشُ سوُمَرو

2nd & 4th Premier of Sindh

List of members of the 1st Provincial Assembly of Sindh
- In office 23 March 1938 – 18 April 1940
- Governor: Sir Lancelot Graham, Joseph Hugh Garrett (acting)
- Preceded by: Sir Ghulam Hussain Hidayat Ullah
- Succeeded by: Mir Bandeh Ali Khan Talpur
- In office 27 March 1942 – 14 October 1942
- Governor: Sir Hugh Dow
- Preceded by: Mir Bandeh Ali Khan Talpur
- Succeeded by: Sir Ghulam Hussain Hidayat Ullah

Personal details
- Born: 1900 Shikarpur, Sindh, British India (now Pakistan)
- Died: 14 May 1943 (aged 42–43) Shikarpur, Sindh, British India (now Pakistan)
- Party: Sind Ittehad Party
- Spouse: Sahib Khatoon
- Children: Rahim Bux, Hyder Bux, Abdul Samad, Razia, Safia, Afroze, Qudsia and Saeeda
- Profession: government contractor, politician

Allah Bux Muhammad Umar Soomro (Sindhi:اللهَ بخشُ محمد عمر سوُمَرو) (1900 – 14 May 1943), (Khan Bahadur Sir Allah Bux Muhammad Umar Soomro OBE till September 1942) or Allah Baksh Soomro, was a zamindar, government contractor, Indian independence activist and politician from the province of Sindh in colonial India. He is considered to be amongst the best premiers of the province, known for promoting Hindu-Muslim unity and campaigning for an independent, united India. He was referred to as Shaheed or "martyr".

Allah Bux Soomro was born in 1900 in Shikarpur in Sindh in an affluent family. He founded the Sind Ittehad Party and served as the Chief Minister of Sindh from 23 March 1938 to 18 April 1940 and 7 March 1941 to 14 October 1942. He was assassinated, by assailants thought to belong to the All India Muslim League, in 1943. Soomro had three sons and five daughters.

== Early life ==
Allah Bux Soomro was born in the family fief of Shikarpur in northern Sindh in 1900. He was a member of the Soomro (Jat) clan of Sindh. He got his early education at Thull tehsil of Jacobabad in 1910. Later, he got admission in higher secondary school in Shikarpur in 1911, and passed his matriculation examinations in 1918 and joined his father's contract business. His father was famous contractor and businessman in the region.

== Career ==
Soomro joined politics at an early age and was elected to the Jacobabad municipality in 1923. In 1928, he was elected as a member of local board at Sukkur district, and later became its president in 1930. In 1931, he was granted the title of 'little Khan Bahadur'.

== Tenure as premier ==
Soomro served as the Chief Minister of Sindh for two terms, starting from 23 March 1938, to 18 April 1940, and 7 March 1941, to 14 October 1942, and held the portfolios of finance, excise, and industries.

Allah Bux Soomro's Cabinet (23 March 1938 – 18 April 1940)
| Minister | Portfolio |
|---|---|
| Allah Bux Soomro | Home, Finance |
| Pir Ilahi Bux | Revenue |
| Nichaldas C. Vazirani | Public Works Department, Public Health, Medical |
Allah Bux Soomro's Cabinet (7 March 1941 – 14 October 1942)
| Allah Bux Soomro | Finance |
| Ghulam Hussain Hidayat Ullah | Home, Parliamentary Affairs, Law |
| Pir Ilahi Bux | Education, Industries, Labour, Excise, Forest and Rural Development |
| R. S. Gokaldas Mewaldas | Local Government and Agriculture |
| Pirzada Abdul Sattar | Public Works Department, Medical, Public Health |

Soon after taking over as Chief Minister of Sindh, Soomro overruled the banishment of Ubaidullah Sindhi, thereby allowing him to return to his homeland. He reduced the salary of ministers to Rs.500 per month and prohibited the practice of nominating members to local bodies.

Soomro also introduced reforms in religion. In 1938, he prohibited Ziwal-Haj. He also banned the Om Mandali, a predecessor of the Brahma Kumari organisation.

=== Ziwal-Haj controversy ===
In 1934, a Muslim Pir of Lawari had organised a local Haj for those who could not afford to visit Saudi Arabia. The pilgrims gathered on Ziwal-Haj, read namaz while turning to the dargah, went to a local well renamed Zam Zam, addressed the Pir as Khuda and greeted each other as Hajji. It gave these poor Muslims great spiritual satisfaction. The Muslims denounced it as un-Islamic, agitated violently, and forced Allah Bux Soomro to ban it in 1938. This group had similar beliefs as Zikri sect of Balochistan.

=== The Manzilgah controversy ===
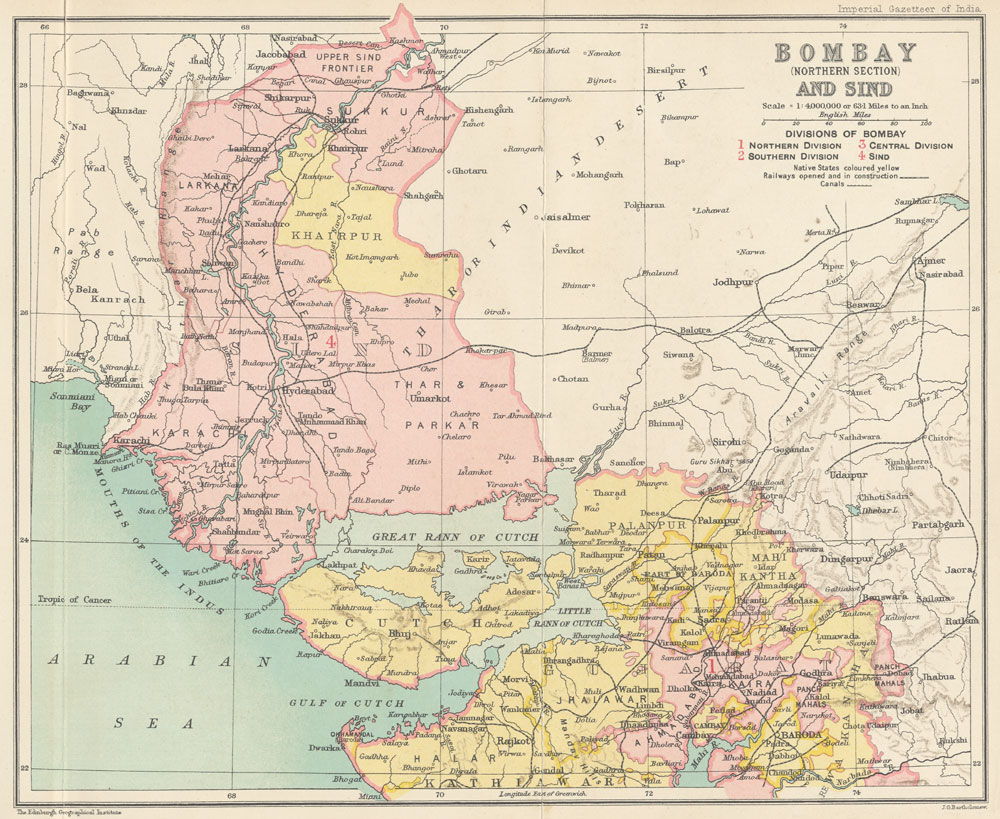
Northern part of Bombay and Sind comprising the northern division of Bombay and the Commissionerate of Sind

Manzilgah was the name of a couple of old buildings near the Sadh Belo temple in Sukkur which were used as a government godown. It was variously claimed to be a mosque and an inn. The Hindus opposed Muslim League claims that the building was a mosque as the presence of a mosque so close to a Hindu temple would trigger communal tensions in the area. The Ghulam Hussain Government responded by rebuffing the extremist elements by claiming that the buildings were government property. When Allah Bux became Premier, he sent a commission which reported that Manzilgah was an inn, based upon the original Persian inscriptions on the building. Despite this, in June 1939, the Muslim League launched an agitation. Senior League leaders G. M. Syed, M. A. Khuhro and Sir Abdullah Haroon forcibly occupied Manzilgah from 3 October 1939, to 19 November 1939. The government, initially, tried to quell the movement through the use of force. However, when the tactic proved unsuccessful, the government yielded and allowed Muslims to pray in Manzilgah.

At about the same time, the Sufi poet, Bhagat Kanwar Ram was assassinated. Communal riots broke out in Sukkur and there was a total strike which lasted 15 days. In November 1939, the Sind Hindu Provincial Conference, presided over by Dr. Moonje of the Hindu Mahasabha threatened Muslims with retaliation if the mosque was not recovered by the government. While some sources claim that 17 Muslims and 40 Hindus were killed in the riots another claims that the toll of Hindus killed was over 60.

A compromise was reached in February 1941, when Manzilgah was handed over to Muslims but not before the Muslims had agreed not to obstruct the playing of music in the nearby Saadha Belo temple. Leaders of the Muslim League later admitted "that the Manzilgah issue was a bogus (hathradoo) agitation, staged just to topple Allah Bux."

== Tenure as president of the All India Azad Muslim Conference ==
Soomro replying to Syed on Jinnah's ideology

"Mr. Jinnah's view that the country should be divided because the Muslims are a separate nation on the basis of religion is not acceptable to me because this ideology is Un-Islamic, archaic and against all modern principles of nationalism."

— G. M. Syed, The case of Sindh, p. 203

Allah Baksh Soomro founded the All India Azad Muslim Conference in order to represent Islamic organisations and political parties that championed a united Hindustan and opposed the partition of India.

Allah Baksh Soomro stated that "No power on earth can rob anyone of his faith and convictions, and no power on earth shall be permitted to rob Indian Muslims of their just rights as Indian nationals." He proclaimed that the very concept of "The Muslims as a separate nation in India on the basis of their religion, is un-Islamic."

On 27 April 1940, over 1400 delegates participated in Delhi session of the All India Azad Muslim Conference, which Allah Bakhsh Soomro presided over. The Canadian orientalist Wilfred Cantwell Smith remarked that those presented represented the ‘majority of India’s Muslims’.

== Later life ==
In 1940, a no-confidence motion was passed against Allah Bux Soomro. The Indian National Congress joined hands with the Muslim League and voted against him. Following the dismissal of his government, Soomro appointed member of the National Defence Council in which he served till 1942, when the Quit India Movement was started. In September 1942, Soomro renounced his knighthood and the Khan Bahadur title which the British government had bestowed upon him. He also resigned from the National Defence Council.

Allah Bux Soomro was briefly elected back to power in March 1941 and served as Premier for about a year. However, he was dismissed by the Governor due to his support for the Quit India Movement.

== Assassination ==
Allah Bux Soomro was assassinated on 14 May 1943, while he was travelling in a Tanga in his hometown of Shikarpur. He was 43 years old at the time of his death. Rumors pinned the murder on agents of the pro-separatist All India Muslim League.

== Legacy and analysis ==
Political analysts, such as Urvashi Butalia, have stated that the Sind Assembly of Colonial India would not have supported the Lahore resolution if Allah Bakhsh Soomro was alive during that time, and would have instead opted for a united India.

Shaheed Allah Bux Soomro University of Art, Design and Heritage in Jamshoro is named after Allah Bux Soomro.

His son, Rahim Bux Soomro, was a politician in Pakistan. His nephew, Elahi Bux Soomro, was the speaker of the National Assembly of Pakistan and a Veteran Politician. His grandson, Dr. Abdul Hafeez Shaikh, served as member of senate and later as minister of finance in Pakistan.

== Bibliography ==
- Khadim Husain Soomro (2001). Allah Bux Soomro: Apostle of Secular Harmony. Sain Publishers.
- Shamsul Islam (2015). Muslims Against Partition. Pharos Media & Publishing PvtLtd.

Political offices
| Preceded by Sir Ghulam Hussain Hidayat Ullah | Chief Minister of Sindh; 23 March 1938 – 18 April 1940 | Succeeded by Mir Bandeh Ali Khan Talpur |
| Preceded by Mir Bandeh Ali Khan Talpur | 2nd term 7 March 1941 – 14 October 1942 | Succeeded by Sir Ghulam Hussain Hidayat Ullah |
