= Gazdar, Iran =

Gazdar گزدر
- Village
- Location within Iran
- Coordinates: 29°07′37″N 58°15′12″E
- Country: Iran
- Province: Kerman
- County: Bam
- Bakhsh: Central
- Rural District: Howmeh

Population (2006)
  - Total: 161
- Time zone: UTC+3:30 (IRST)
  - Summer (DST): UTC+4:30 (IRDT)

Gazdar (Persian: گزدر; also known as Gozar) is a village in Howmeh Rural District, in the Central District of Bam County, Kerman Province, Iran. At the 2006 census, its population was 161, in 38 families.
