= Hashim Gazdar =

Pakistani politician (1893–1968)

- ہاشم گذدر
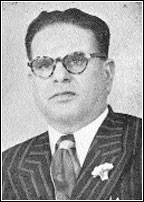

2nd Deputy President of the National Assembly
- In office 28 March 1953 – 24 October 1954
- Speaker: Maulvi Tamizuddin Khan
- Preceded by: Muhammad Tamizuddin Khan
- Succeeded by: C. E. Gibbon (as Deputy Speaker)

Personal details
- Born: 1 February 1893 Jaisalmer, Jaisalmer State, British India
- Died: 19 February 1968 (aged 75) Karachi, Pakistan
- Party: All India Muslim League
- Education: Sindh Madressah-tul-Islam; College of Engineering, Pune

Muhammad Hashim Gazdar (Urdu: محمد ہاشم گذدر; 1 February 1893 – 19 February 1968) was one of the three representatives from Sindh to the Constituent Assembly of Pakistan, and the second Deputy Speaker of the National Assembly of Pakistan.

== Early life ==
Gazdar was born in 1893 in Jaisalmer into a Silawat family, the youngest son of Faiz Muhammad (Fabji) who was a master builder (Gajdhar/Gaidher) of the royal court. After Faiz Muhammad's death young Hashim was brought up by his elder brother Nazar Muhammad who moved with his family from Rajputana to Karachi around 1900. The Silawat community from Jaisalmer had already established a presence in the city following the annexation of Sindh to the British empire since 1843.

Gazdar started his academic career from Sindh Madressah-tul-Islam, Karachi, and completed Intermediate in 1911. He also studied civil engineering, earning a degree from the College of Engineering, Pune in 1916.

He was involved in an uplift project for the lower caste in Bombay, but this was unsuccessful. He and a number of other people were dismissed from this project.

== Political life ==
After losing his job in Bombay he returned to Karachi where he performed his services as an engineer, in District Local Board, Karachi. However, during the subsequent four years, differences on policy matters arose with G. M. Syed, who was then the president of Board; Gazdar resigned.

A popular muslim communalist, he has also said, "The Hindus will have to be eradicated like the Jews in Germany if they did not behave properly"

Later, he joined politics. He was elected a member of the Bombay Legislative Council from Sindh constituency in 1934 election. During his subsequent political career, he was also elected the Mayor of Karachi for the term from May 1941 to May 1942.

During his tenure as a member of the Sindh Assembly, he also joined the Ittehad party for some time. He joined All India Muslim League, which was launching a movement for creation of a separate state for Muslim population of India within the sub-continent (which emerged as Pakistan later) under the leadership of Muhammad Ali Jinnah. Being one of the most confident supporters of Jinnah, he was again elected a member of Legislative Assembly from Sindh and appointed as the Deputy Speaker of the then Sindh Assembly.

Gazdar was among the legislating members who represented Sindh in the first session of Pakistan's first Constituent Assembly, and convened for the purpose of legislation in Sindh Assembly Building, Karachi on 10 August 1947, four days before Pakistan's independence and formation was imminent. Other members included Pirzada Abdul Sattar Abdul Rehman, Muhammad Ayub Khuhro, and J. Ram Das Doulat Ram.

He died in 1968.

== See also ==
- List of mayors of Karachi
- Gazdarabad
