= Abdul Sattar Pirzada =

Pakistani politician

6th Chief Minister of Sindh
- In office 22 May 1953 – 8 November 1954
- Preceded by: Governor's Rule
- Succeeded by: Muhammad Ayub Khuhro

Personal details
- Born: 4 July 1907
- Died: 24 August 1974 (aged 67)
- Party: Pakistan Muslim League

Abdul Sattar Pirzada (4 July 1907 – 24 August 1974) was a Pakistani politician and administrator who served as the Chief Minister of Sindh between May 1953 and November 1954. He also served as the Chairman of the Pakistan Cricket Board (PCB) between September 1951 and July 1953 before becoming chief minister. His son, Abdul Hafeez Pirzada, is known as the architect of Constitution of Pakistan.

== Education ==
Abdul Sattar Pirzada was born on 4 July 1907 in Sukkur, Sindh, Pakistan. He received Primary and Secondary education from Sukkur. He graduated in Mathematics and Law from London University College, England.

== Early career ==
After graduation from England in 1930, he returned to Sindh and began legal practice in his hometown Sukkur. In 1932–33, he served as Assistant Public Procecutor Sukkur and in 1937–38, he served as Public Prosecutor of Jacobabad District.

== Political career ==
His political career began in 1934 when he was elected as a member of Municipal corporation Sukkur. Later on, he served as Vice President of the same corporation. After separation of Sindh from Bombay Presidency, he was elected as a member of Sindh Assembly in 1937. He was appointed as Chief Parliamentary Secretary in 1938. He served as provincial member of Public Works, Irrigation and Health in 1941. In September 1942, he returned all his titles to the government in protest of the strict policy adopted by the British government in connection with the Congress' Quit India Movement. On this his ministry was deposed.

In the late 1945, he joined All India Muslim League and was elected as a member of provincial Assembly of Sindh in 1946. He was appointed as Minister of Edulation, Local Self Government and Law in the same year. He then served as Minister of Revenue and Law. After creation of Pakistan in 1947, he first served as a minister of Food, Agriculture and Health, and then minister of Law.

Abdul Sattar Pirzada took oath as the Chief Minister of Sindh on 22 May 1953. Due to his opposition to the One Unit Rule in Pakistan, his Government was dismissed on 8 November 1954. He was elected as a member of West Pakistan Assembly in 1956 and joined the West Pakistan Government as Minister of Law and Agriculture.

== Death ==
Abdul Sattar Pirzada died on 24 August 1974.
