= Jethi Sipahimalani =

Indian politician

- Born: 10 February 1906; Hyderabad, Sindh
- Died: May 21, 1978 (aged 72)

Kumari Jethi Tulsidas Sipahimalani (10 February 1906 — 21 May 1978) was a Sindhi politician and first woman deputy speaker of Sind legislative assembly.

== Early life and career ==
Sipahimalani was born in Hyderabad, Bombay Presidency on 10 February 1906. She completed her early education from Kundanmal Girls High School Hyderabad and Indian Girls School Karachi. Worked as principal in Daya Ashram.

== Political career ==
In 1930 she left her job and joined the Indian independence movement, against British rule. She went to prison from 1932 to 1942 for taking part in Salt Satyagraha and Quit India movement. Sipahimalani was elected twice on general seats of the Sindh legislative assembly and in 1937 she became the first woman deputy speaker of Sind assembly. She migrated to India after the partition and went on to became a member of the Maharashtra legislature.
