= Abdul Majid Sindhi =

Writer, politician, journalist of Pakistan

Shaikh Abdul Majeed Sindhi
- شيخ عبدالمجيد سنڌي
- Born: Jetha Nand; 7 July 1889; Thatta, Sindh
- Died: 24 May 1978 (aged 88); Hyderabad, Sindh
- Education: Matriculation
- Occupations: Writer, journalist, politician
- Partner: Ayesha Begum
- Children: Apa Zuhra (Daughter), Anwar Shaikh (son),Khalid (son), Tariq (son), Khadija (Daughter), Bilquees (Daughter),Khairunisa (Daughter)
- Relatives: Leela Ram (Father), Leelaan (Mother), Krishna (Sister), Gianchand (Brother),
- Writing career
- Genre: Politics
- Literary movement: India's Progressive movement

Shaikh Abdul Majeed Sindhi (Sindhi: شيخ عبدالمجيد سنڌي; 7 July 1889 – 24 May 1978) was a famous Sindhi writer, politician and journalist of Sindh.

== Education ==
Shaikh Abdul Majeed Sindhi matriculated (completed 10th Grade in school) (Sindhi: ست درجه فائنل) from Thatta, Sindh in British India.

== Conversion to Islam ==
He was born in a Hindu family in Thatta. Since childhood he was in the search of mystic approach and in this regard on 10 February 1908, he converted to Islam on the hands of Shaikh Abdul Rahim at Hyderabad, Sindh.

== Professional career ==
Shaikh Abdul Majeed Sindhi became Munshi (Sindhi: منشي) at a senior advocate Mr. Deechand Ojha. Afterwards he lived at Hyderabad where Rais Ghulam Muhammad Khan Bhurgri made him editor of his own newspaper Al Amen (Sindhi: الامين). Having been inspired from his intellect Bhurgri made him his political adviser.

== Political career ==
He was an active participant of Silk Letter Movement (Reshmi Rumal Tahrik) (Sindhi: ريشمي رومال تحريڪ), by Molana Ubeduallah Sindhi, in which he was imprisoned in 1919 for three years. Later, he addressed a campaign against the British Raj in a procession in 1920 at Larkana and was again imprisoned for two years. In 1924, he became editor of Daily Al Waheed, Sindh's only daily newspaper at the time. Through this platform, he incited the Muslim population. On 16 November 1929, he participated in All-India Muslim League session at Allahabad, All India Khilafat Conference at Ajmer, All Parties Muslim Unity Conference and Azad Sindh Conference at Karachi (1930). His efforts for the separation of Sindh from Bombay were to be cherished. Sindh was separated from Bombay in 1936, he took part in the first election of Sindh Assembly (1937) from his own party and defeating Sir Shahnawaz, he became member of the Sindh assembly. In 1940, under the ministry of Mir Bunda Ali Khan, he was made a Minister in Sindh. In 1943, he left Muslim League and joined All Pakistan Awami Tahreek which was led by Khan Abdul Ghaffar Khan in 1949.

== Publications ==
Shaikh Abdul Majeed Sindhi had written some books, which are: Fathe Spain (Sindhi: فتح اسپين), Hazrat Umer Bin Abdul Aziz (R.A) (Sindhi: حضرت عمر بن عبدالعزيزرضي الله تعاليٰ عنه) Karachi Sindh Khe Milan Ghurje (Sindhi: ڪراچي سنڌ کي ملڻ گهرجي), All Murtaza (Sindhi: المرتضيٰ), Tareekh Jawahir (Sindhi: تحريڪ جواهر), Hazrat Ali & Hazrat Umer (R.A) (Sindhi: حضرت علي ۽ حضرت عمر رضي الله تعاليٰ عنه)

== Death ==
Shaikh Abdul Majeed Sindhi died 24 May 1978 at Hyderabad, Sindh and was buried at historical Graveyard Makli near the grave of writer Makhdoom Mohammad Hashim Thattvi according to his will.
