= Pir Ilahi Bux =

Pakistani politician and ex-Chief minster of Sindh (1890-1975)

- پير الاهي بخش
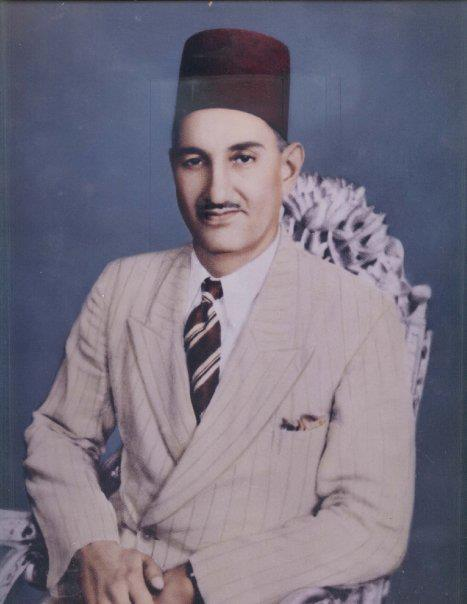

2nd Chief Minister of Sindh
- In office 3 May 1948 – 4 February 1949
- Governors-General: Mohammad Ali Jinnah; Khawaja Nazimuddin
- Preceded by: Mohammad Ayub Khuhro
- Succeeded by: Yusuf Haroon

Personal details
- Born: 9 July 1890 Pir Jo Goth, Sind Province, British India (present-day Sindh, Pakistan)
- Died: 8 October 1975 (aged 85)
- Party: Pakistan Muslim League

Pir Ilahi Bux or Pir Ilahi Buksh (Sindhi: پير الاهي بخش; Urdu: پیر الٰہی بخش) was a Pakistani politician and activist who was a prominent member of the Pakistan Movement and served as the Chief Minister of Sindh from 1948 to 1949.

== Biography ==
=== Early life ===
Bux was born at Pir Jo Goth near Bhansyedabad on 9 July 1890 in a spiritual family of Dadu District, Sindh, Pakistan. He was only 9 years of age when his father Pir Nawaz Ali Shah died. He was brought up by his maternal uncle Pir Lal Muhammad. His family is the descendant of Makhdoom Moosa, 5th son of Makhdoom Sarwar Nooh.

=== Education ===
Bux received his primary education from Government Primary School Bhansyedabad and did his matriculation from Naz High School, Khairpur (Mirs). Thereafter, he went to Aligarh Muslim University for higher education. He was the first member of his family who received higher education. Deeply moved by the Khilafat Movement, led by Maulana Mohammad Ali Jouhar, he soon left Aligarh Muslim University and joined Jamia Millia Islamia headed by Maulana Muhammad Ali Jauhar and did his B.A. from there. He was so deeply motivated by the Khilafat Movement and the struggle for the freedom of the Muslim Ummah that he left his studies and returned to Sindh as a leader of Khilafat Movement.

On the suppression of the Khilafat Movement by the British Government, Pir Sahib was advised by Late Sir Shah Nawaz Bhutto, the then President, District Local Board, Larkana to go back to Aligarh for completing his studies. He also awarded him scholarship of the District Board for pursuing his educational career. Pir Sahib acceded to the advice of Sir Shah Nawaz Bhutto and proceeded to Aligarh Muslim University from where he did his M.A. in History and thereafter obtained his degree in Bachelor of Law. Pir Sahib soon returned to Larkana and started his legal practice there as Dadu was part of Larkana district in those times.

=== Politics ===
After finishing his education, Pir Ilahi Bux started taking part in politics. He was elected as a member of the Sindh Legislative Assembly in 1937 in the election held under the 1935 Act. He got elected again by defeating influential landlords and zamindars of that time.

Pir Ilahi Bux founded the Sindh United Front which aimed at separating Sindh from Bombay Presidency and which ultimately contributed significantly toward the establishment of Sindh as a separate province. Pir Ilahi Bux was inducted in the Sindh Cabinet headed by Khan Bahadur Allah Bux Soomro and was given the portfolio of education among other departments. Pir Ilahi Bux remained Education Minister for ten years.

Pir Ilahi Bux having been deeply inspired by Quaid-e-Azam Muhammad Ali Jinnah, soon joined the Muslim League and became one of his most trusted Lieutenants. He was an indefatigable fighter for education in Sindh and strove hard to introduce adult education and compulsory primary education in every corner of the province. Deeply committed to the cause of education, he successfully steered the Sindh University Act through the Sindh Assembly. Quaid-e-Azam was deeply moved by this act of Pir Illahi Bux and personally donated Rs. 150,000I towards the University at that time. Pir Ilahi Bux was one of the pioneers of S.M. College and remained as the President of Sindh Madressah Board for years together.

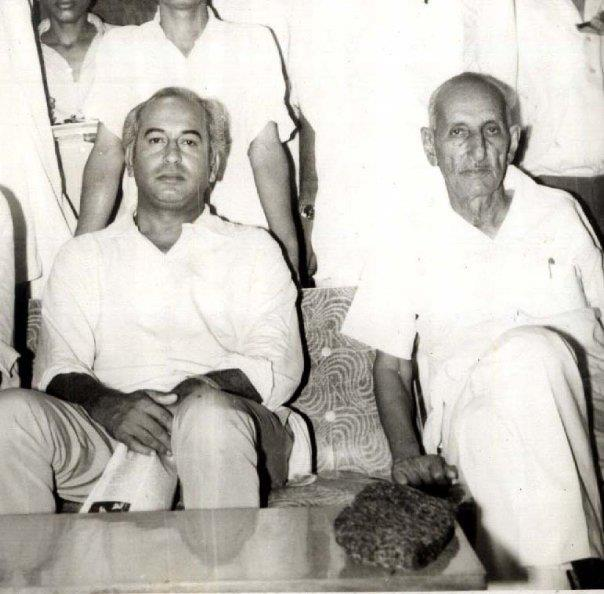
Pir Ilahi Bux (Right) with Zulfiqar Ali Bhutto in the 1960s.

In 1948, he was nominated the Chief Minister of Sindh province by Quaid-e-Azam Muhammad Ali Jinnah. Pir Sahib was always proud to have been nominated as the Chief Minister of Sindh by no less than the Quaid-e-Azam himself. He was also the founder of Sindh University and was the prime mover of the establishment of Urdu College, Karachi. Pir Ilahi Bux was deeply perturbed over the mass influx of Muslim refugees from India during the early period of the independence of Pakistan and initiated a number of moves for the settlement of refugees in Sindh. He established the famous Pir Ilahi Buksh Colony in Karachi towards the end in 1948. He was also instrumental in inviting eminent educationists from Aligarh Muslim University, his alma mater, to serve the Muslims of Pakistan by appointing them in the Sindh University. One of such personalities was Professor A. B. A. Haleem from the Aligarh Muslim University, who was appointed by him as the first Vice Chancellor of Sindh University.

Liaquat Ali Khan had started legal proceedings against him and got him disqualified for six years on charges of corruption.

Pir Ilahi Bux died on 8 October 1975 leaving behind him 5 sons and 2 daughters. The names of the sons are Pir Muhammad Nawaz, Pir Shahnawaz, Pir Abdul Majeed, Pir Abdul Hameed and Pir Abdul Rasheed. His grandson Advocate Pir Mazhar Ul Haq succeeded him in politics and remained member of the Provincial Assembly of Sindh and remained Minister of Housing and Town Planning, Law and Parliamentary Affairs and Education in Sindh in the PPP Govts of 1988, 1993 and 2008 respectively. Pir Mazhar Ul Haq is considered one of the most loyal members of the Pakistan Peoples Party and has recently served as the Senior Minister of Sindh Province holding the portfolios of Education, Literacy and Criminal Prosecution Service. He has contested in six elections so far in his political career starting from 1988 and has won all of them.

Pir Ilahi Bux's great-granddaughter Ms Marvi Pir Mazhar contested as the member of the Sindh Legislative Assembly from Dadu constituency in 2002 General Elections when her father Pir Mazhar Ul Haq faced political victimization by the government of General Pervez Musharraf and had to go into exile along with Benazir Bhutto and other Peoples Party leaders. Ms Marvi Pir Mazhar was the first ever directly elected woman from this district. His great-grandson Barrister Pir Mujeeb Ul Haq is an office bearer of the Pakistan Peoples Party in Dadu District and has his own law practice by the name of P.I.B. Law Associates having chambers in Karachi, Hyderabad and Dadu. He is also an elected member of Parliament from the Dadu Constituency.

== Books ==
- Pioneers of Freedom (1997)

Political offices
Preceded by Muhammad Ayub Khuhro	Chief Minister of Sindh; 1948 – 1949	Succeeded by Yusuf Haroon
