= Ghulam Hussain Hidayatullah =

Pakistani politician

Khan Bahadur Sir Ghulam Hussain Hidayatullah
- غلام حسين هدايت الله

1st Governor of Sindh
- In office 15 August 1947 – 4 October 1948
- Governors-General: Mohammad Ali Jinnah; Sir Khawaja Nazimuddin
- Preceded by: Position Established
- Succeeded by: Shaikh Din Muhammad

1st & 5th Premier of Sindh
- In office 28 April 1937 – 23 March 1938
- Preceded by: Position Established
- Succeeded by: Allah Bux Soomro
- In office 14 October 1942 – 14 August 1947
- Preceded by: Allah Bux Soomro
- Succeeded by: Muhammad Ayub Khuhro

Personal details
- Born: January 1879 Shikarpur, Sind, British India (present-day Sindh, Pakistan)
- Died: 4 October 1948 (aged 69) Karachi, Federal Capital Territory, Dominion of Pakistan (present-day Sindh, Pakistan)
- Spouse: Sughra Begum (m. 1940)

Khan Bahadur Sir Ghulam Hussain Hidayatullah KCSI (Sindhi: غلام حسين هدايت الله; January 1879 – 4 October 1948) was a colonial Indian and Pakistani politician from Sindh. He held several offices in Sindh including 1st Chief Minister (1937–1938) and being re-elected as 5th Chief Minister (1942–1947).

== Early life and education ==
Ghulam Hussain Hidayatullah was born in 1879 in Shikarpur, Sindh and received his education from Shikarpur High School, Sindh Madressah, Karachi, D. J. Sindh College, Karachi and Government Law College, Bombay.

His son, Anwar Hussain Hidayatullah, married Doulat Haroon Hidayatullah, daughter of Abdullah Haroon.

== Career ==
After completing his LL.B. in 1902, he started his legal practice in Hyderabad Sindh. He started his public career as Vice President of the Hyderabad Municipality. Hidayatullah was also the first Non-official President of the Hyderabad District Board. In 1921, he became a Member of the Bombay Legislative Council.

In the same year (1921), he was appointed a Minister in the Bombay Government, an office which he occupied until 1928 when he was made a Member of the Executive council of the Governor of Bombay. He served in this capacity until 1934. He received the title of Khan Bahadur from the British government, which also knighted him in the 1926 New Year Honours and further appointed him a Knight Commander of the Most Exalted Order of the Star of India (KCSI) in the 1933 Birthday Honours.

Hidayatullah served as the Chief Minister of Sindh for two separate terms. The first term was 28 April 1937 to 23 March 1938. The second term was 7 March 1941 to 14 October 1947, and served the longest tenure that any chief minister has so far held.

As a Minister, Ghulam Hussain Hidayatullah was associated with the famous 'Sukkur Barrage project' which contributed so much to the prosperity of Sindh in later years. Ghulam Hussain Hidayatullah, along with Khan Bahadur Muhammad Ayub Khuhro, Syed Miran Shah and Sir Shah Nawaz Bhutto, represented Sindh in the Round Table Conferences in London. They convinced the Chairman of the 'Committee on Sindh' that Sindh was not to be a deficit province and had sufficient revenue and administrative capability to be a full-fledged province. Sindh was separated from Bombay and its first assembly came into being in 1937.

After the separation of Sindh from Bombay, Sir Ghulam Hussain became the first Chief Minister and remained so until 1947 with two short breaks when Allah Bux Soomro and Mir Bande Ali Talpur had formed their Governments. He became the Chief Minister of Sindh three times; Sir Ghulam Hussain Hidayatullah was opposed to the partition of India.

In 1938, the All India Muslim League passed a resolution in its conference held at Khaliq Dino Hall Karachi, demanding a separate homeland for the Muslims of India. In 1943, the Sindh Assembly became the first Provincial Assembly of the sub-continent to pass an official resolution in favour of the creation of Pakistan.

When the Muslim League in 1946 decided on a policy of renunciation of titles conferred by the British Government, Sir Ghulam renounced his British titles and honorifics.

After the partition of India and creation of Pakistan, he became the first Governor of Sindh from 14 August 1947 to 4 October 1948. Ghulam Hussain Hidayatullah earned the unique distinction of being the only Pakistani Governor of a Province in Pakistan as all other Governors were British.

Within a month of the passing of Muhammad Ali Jinnah, Ghulam Hussain Hidayatullah died in Karachi on 4 October 1948.

== See also ==
- List of members of the 1st Provincial Assembly of Sindh
- List of members of the 2nd Provincial Assembly of Sindh

Political offices
Preceded by Sindh province reconstituted	Chief Minister of Sindh; 28 April 1937 – 23 March 1938	Succeeded by Khan Bahadur Allah Bux Soomro
Preceded by Khan Bahadur Allah Bux Soomro	2nd term 7 March 1941 – 14 October 1942	Succeeded by Khan Bahadur Muhammad Ayub Khuhro
