= Muhammad Ayub Khuhro =

Pakistani politician

Ayub Khuhro
- محمد ايوب کهڙو
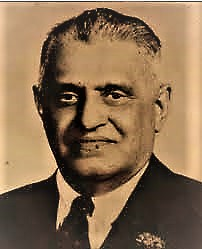

1st, 5th & 7th Chief Minister of Sindh
- In office 16 August 1947 – 28 April 1948
- Governor: Ghulam Hussain Hidayatullah
- Preceded by: Ghulam Hussain Hidayatullah
- Succeeded by: Pir Ilahi Bux
- In office 25 March 1951 – 29 December 1951
- Governor: Mian Aminuddin
- Preceded by: Qazi Fazlullah Ubaidullah
- Succeeded by: Governor's Rule

Minister of Defense
- In office 9 April 1958 – 7 October 1958
- Prime Minister: Feroz Khan Noon
- Preceded by: Feroz Khan Noon
- Succeeded by: Ayub Khan

Personal details
- Born: 14 August 1901
- Died: 1980 (aged 78–79)
- Party: Pakistan Muslim League

Muhammad Ayub Khuhro (Sindhi: محمد ايوب کهڙو) (14 August 1901 – 1980) was a Pakistani politician who served as the Chief Minister of Sindh for three terms, and as the Defence Minister in the Feroz Khan Noon Ministry.

In 1946, Khuhro was elected by the Sindh Provincial Assembly to be among the three members to represent the province in the Constituent Assembly of India but he abdicated attendance until the Mountbatten Plan sanctioned the creation of Pakistan and its own constituent assembly.

Hamida Khuhro, an academic, is his daughter and has written his biography.

== See also ==
- Khuhro
- List of members of the 1st Provincial Assembly of Sindh

Political offices
Preceded by Ghulam Hussain Hidayatullah	Chief Minister of Sindh; 1947 – 1948	Succeeded by Pir Ilahi Bux
Preceded by Qazi Fazlullah Ubaidullah	2nd term 1951	Succeeded by Governor's rule
Preceded by Pirzada Abdul Sattar	3rd term 1954 – 1955	Succeeded by Post abolished
Preceded by Feroz Khan Noon	Defence Minister of Pakistan; 1958	Succeeded by Ayub Khan
