= Aligarh Movement =

Religious reforms of Muslims (later decades of the 19th century)

The Aligarh Movement was a socioreligious movement in British India which aimed to establish a modern system of Western-style scientific education for the Muslim population during the later decades of the 19th century. The movement's name derives from the fact that its core and origins lay in the city of Aligarh in Central India and, in particular, with the foundation of the Muhammadan Anglo-Oriental College in 1875. The founder of the oriental college, and the other educational institutions that developed from it, was Sir Syed Ahmed Khan. He became the leading light of the wider Aligarh Movement.

The education reform established a base, and an impetus, for the wider Movement: a Pakistani Muslim renaissance that had profound implications for the religion, the politics, the culture and society of the Indian subcontinent.

== History ==
The failure of the Indian Rebellion of 1857 saw the end of the Mughal empire and the succession of the British. The Muslim society during the post mutiny period was in a deteriorating state. Sir Syed Ahmad Khan found the Muslim society to be educationally, socially and culturally backward. He blamed the prevailing education system for the degrading state of the Muslim society. This led Sir Syed to initiate a movement for the intellectual, educational, social and cultural regeneration of the Muslim society. This movement came to be known as the Aligarh movement after Sir Syed established his school at Aligarh which later became the center of the movement.

== Institutes ==
- In 1859, Sir Syed established Gulshan School at Moradabad. In 1862 he founded the Victoria School at Ghazipur.
- Sir Syed founded the Translation Society in Ghazipur in 1863 to translate major works in the field of sciences and modern arts into Urdu. It was later renamed as the Scientific Society and moved to Aligarh. The Society released two journals – The Aligarh Institute Gazette and the Tehzeeb-ul-Akhlaq, known as the Mohammedan Social Reformer in English.
- In 1866 the British Indian Association was established at Aligarh with the intention of addressing the political needs of the people.
- The Bihar Scientific Society was established by Syed Imdad Ali in Muzaffarpur in 1868. The society also launched a fortnightly newspaper, Akhbarul Akhyar.
- The Bihar Scientific Society and Bhumihar Brahman Sabha together established a college in Muzaffarpur on 3 July 1899. This is now known as Langat Singh College.
- In 1875 Sir Syed and Moulvi Samiullah Khan established a madarsa Madrasatul Uloom Musalmanan-e-Hind in Aligarh in his bungalow. The school had a primary section and a senior section known as Muhammadan Anglo-Oriental Collegiate School.
- Two years later, in 1877, the school was converted into the Muhammadan Anglo-Oriental College and then university in 1920.
- In 1877 the foundation of Lytton Library was laid by Lord Lytton for the students of MAO College. It was renamed as the Maulana Azad Library after Independence.
- A debating club was founded at MAO College by Sir Syed in 1884. It was renamed Siddons Union Club after its first principal Henry George Siddons. It came to be known as Muslim University Union after the college became a university.
- In 1886 Sir Syed founded the Muhammedan Educational Congress, an organisation to reform and educate Indian Muslims. Its name was changed to All India Muhammadan Educational Conference in 1890.
- Sir Syed founded the United Patriotic Association in 1888 along with Raja Sivaprasad of Beneras to promote political co-operation with the British and ensure Muslim participation in the British Indian Government.
- In 1889 Sahabzada Aftab Ahmad Khan established Duty Society or Anjuman-Al-Farz to support the poor and needy students of the Mohammadan Anglo Oriental (MAO) College.
- In 1890 Mohsin-ul-Mulk founded Urdu Defence Central Committee later renamed to Urdu Defence Association for the advocacy of Urdu.
- To promote the political interests of the Muslims before the British Government, the Muhammedan Anglo-Oriental Defense Association was established in 1893.
- In 1893 the Muhammedan Educational Conference established Anjuman-i Taraqqi-i Urdu for the promotion of Urdu. The first anjuman was held in Delhi with Thomas Walker Arnold as its president and Shibli Nomani its secretary.
- After the death of Sir Syed in 1899, the Old Boys Association was formed at Aligarh to generate support for the Aligarh Movement. Maulvi Bahadur Ali was the founding secretary of the association.
- Sir Syed Memorial Fund was established by Sahabzada Aftab Ahmad Khan in 1899 to raise MAO College to a university.
- In 1901 Mohammadan Political Organisation was founded by Nawab Waqar-ul-Mulk to present Muslim grievances before the government.
- Sheikh Abdullah launched the Urdu monthly magazine Khatoon in 1904 to promote education of girls.
- In 1906 the All India Muslim League was founded to safeguard the rights of Indian Muslims.
- In 1906 Sheikh Abdullah and his wife Wahid Jahan Begum established a small school for girls known as Aligarh Zenana Madarsa in Aligarh.
- In 1914 Begum Sultan Jahan founded the All India Muslim Ladies Conference at Aligarh. The Begum served as President of the Conference, while Nafis Dulhan Begum from Aligarh was its Secretary.
- On 29 October 1920 Jamia Millia Islamia was established at Aligarh. It was later moved to Delhi.
- On 17 December 1920, MAO College was granted the status of university and Aligarh Muslim University was established. The Raja of Mahmudabad Mohammad Ali Mohammad Khan was appointed the vice-chancellor.
- In 1929, Zenana Madarsa became an Intermediate College and In 1930 the girl's college was converted into a Women’s College under the affiliation of Aligarh Muslim University.
- A new constitution was drafted for the Muslim University Union in 1952 and it came to be known as the Aligarh Muslim University Students' Union

== Members ==
The prominent members involved with the movement have included.

- Sir Syed Ahmad Khan, founder of Muhammadan Anglo-Oriental College and Aligarh Muslim University
- Moulvi Samiullah Khan, first President of Muhammadan Educational Conference
- Aga Khan III, founder and Pro-Chancellor of Aligarh Muslim University, founder & first president of All India Muslim League
- Raja Jai Kishan Das, secretary of Scientific Society and officiating editor of Aligarh Institute Gazette
- George Farquhar Irving Graham, member of "Scientific Society" and biographer of Sir Syed
- Zakaullah Dehlvi, associate of Sir Syed and member of Scientific Society
- Nazir Ahmad Dehlvi, associate of Sir Syed and member of Scientific Society
- Maulvi Syed Zainul Abideen, associate of Sir Syed, donor of MAO College
- Khwaja Muhammad Yusuf, associate of Sir Syed
- Hemedullah Khan, son of Moulvi Samiullah Khan
- Abdul Majeed Khwaja, associate of Sir Syed
- Mahendra Singh of Patiala, donor of MAO College
- Henry Siddons, first Principal of MAO College
- Theodore Beck, second Principal of MAO College
- Theodore Morison, third Principal of MAO College
- William Archbold, fourth Principal of MAO College
- J.H. Towle, fifth Principal of MAO College
- Mohammad Ali Mohammad Khan, trustee of MAO College and founding Vice-chancellor of AMU
- Muhammad Muzammilullah Khan, trustee of MAO College and later Vice-chancellor of AMU
- Ross Masood, trustee of MAO College and later Vice-chancellor of AMU
- Ziauddin Ahmad, founding pro Vice-chancellor of AMU
- Raja Sivaprasad, associate of Sir Syed and founder of United Patriotic Association
- Chiragh Ali, educationist and associate of Sir Syed
- Mir Turab Ali Khan, Salar Jung I, donor of MAO College
- Nawab Waqar-ul-Mulk Kamboh, honorary secretary of MAO College
- Nawab Mohsin-ul-Mulk, secretary of MAO College
- Syed Mahmood, Sir Syed's son and joint secretary of MAO College.
- Hasrat Mohani
- Shibli Nomani, associate of Sir Syed and first secretary of Anjuman-i Taraqqi-i Urdu
- Altaf Hussain Hali, member of the Muhammedan Educational Conference
- Syed Ameer Ali, member of the Muhammedan Educational Conference
- Tufail Ahmad Manglori, member of the Muhammedan Educational Conference
- Thomas Walker Arnold, first president of Anjuman-i Taraqqi-i Urdu
- Sheikh Abdullah, founder of Women's College, Aligarh
- Nawab Mohammad Ismail Khan, associate of Sir Syed
- Kunwar Luft Ali Khan of Chhattari
- Zafar Ali Khan
- Shaukat Ali
- Mohammad Ali Jauhar
- Sahibzada Aftab Ahmad Khan, founder of Anjuman al-Farz or Duty Society
- Abdur Rehman Bijnori
- Syed Ali Bilgrami
- Syed Nabiullah, member of Muhammedan Educational Conference
- Sultan Jahan, Begum of Bhopal, founding Chancellor of Aligarh Muslim University
- Abdul Haq, secretary of Anjuman-i Taraqqi-i Urdu
- Syed Sajjad Haider Yaldram, the founding Registrar of AMU
- Shah Muhammad Sulaiman, member of Muhammedan Educational Conference and later Vice-chancellor of AMU
- Khwaja Salimullah, founding member of All India Muslim League
- Mian Muhammad Shafi, founding member of All India Muslim League
- Khwaja Ghulam Saiyidain
- Rafi Ahmed Kidwai
- Hamid Ali Khan of Rampur
- Badruddin Tyabji, donor of MAO College
- Adamjee Peerbhoy, donor of MAO College and early member of All-India Muslim League

== Opposition ==
The chief detractors of the Aligarh Movement were the conservative Ulemas of the time who blamed Sir Syed for promoting Western ethics and customs among the Muslims. The Deoband school was also opposed to the Aligarh Movement. Sir Syed and the movement was ridiculed in the Awadh Punch by his detractors like Pandit Ratan Nath Sarshar, Munshi Sajjad Hussain and Akbar Allahabadi. He was also opposed by Pan-Islamist thinker and activist Jamāl al-Dīn al-Afghānī.

== Impact ==
The Aligarh Movement has made a weighty and lasting contribution to the political emancipation of Indian Muslims. The movement had a profound impact on the Indian society, particularly on the Muslim society compared to the other powerful but less adaptable movements of the 19th century. It influenced a number of other contemporary movements to a great extent that it caused the emergence of other socio-religious movements during the 19th century. The impact of Aligarh Movement was not confined to the Northern India only, but its expansion could be seen on the other regions of the Indian sub-continent during the 20th century. The annual Educational Conferences held in different parts of the country played an effective role in the promotion of education among Muslims and directly or indirectly influenced the growth of institutes like Aligarh Muslim University, Osmania University, Dacca University, Anjuman-i-Tarqqi Urdu, Jamia Millia Islamia, Dar-ul-Uloom Nadva, Lucknow, and Dar-ul-Musannfafin, Azamgarh. By the early 1900 Aligarh Movement became the progenitor to a number of socio-religious movements like the Urdu movement, the Khilafat Movement and the Pakistan Movement.

== Cited sources ==
- Ansari, Asloob Ahmad (2001). Sir Syed Ahmad Khan: A Centenary Tribute. Adam Publishers & Distributors. ISBN 978-81-7435-276-7.
- Hasan, Tariq (2006). The Aligarh Movement and the Making of the Indian Muslim Mind, 1857–2002. Rupa & Company. ISBN 978-81-291-0847-0.
- Kidwai, Shafey (2020). Sir Syed Ahmad Khan: Reason, Religion and Nation. Taylor & Francis. ISBN 978-1-000-29773-7.
- Lelyveld, David (1975). Aligarh's First Generation: Muslim Solidarity and English Education in Northern India, 1875–1900. University of Chicago, Department of History.
- Minault, Gail; Lelyveld, David (1974). "The Campaign for a Muslim University, 1898–1920". Modern Asian Studies. 8 (2): 145–189. doi:10.1017/S0026749X00005448. ISSN 0026-749X. JSTOR 311636.
- Nizami, Khaliq Ahmad (1966). Sayyid Ahmad Khan. Public Resource. Publications Division, Ministry of Information and Broadcasting, Govt. of India. ISBN 978-8123025131.
- Jaleel, Shahid (2004). The Aligarh movement, a chapter in the history of Indian education (phd thesis). Aligarh Muslim University.
- Shan Muhammad (2002). Education and Politics: From Sir Syed to the Present Day : the Aligarh School. APH Publishing. ISBN 978-81-7648-275-2.
- Lambert-Hurley, Siobhan (2004). "Fostering Sisterhood: Muslim Women and the All-India Ladies' Association". Journal of Women's History. 16 (2): 40–65. doi:10.1353/jowh.2004.0047. ISSN 1527-2036. S2CID 144662758.
- Samiuddin, Abida; Khanam, Rashida (2002). Muslim Feminism and Feminist Movement: India. Global Vision Publishing House. ISBN 978-81-87746-30-0.
- Sajjad, Mohammad (2014). Contesting Colonialism and Separatism: Muslims of Muzaffarpur since 1857. Delhi: Primus/Ratnasagar. ISBN 978-9384082048.
- Raza, Syed; Kumar, Subodh (2011). "The Muslim Elite of Bihar and their Responses to the modern education (from the mid of the 19th Century to the beginning of the 20th century)". Proceedings of the Indian History Congress. 72: 884–891. ISSN 2249-1937. JSTOR 44146779.
