= List of Pakistan Movement activists =

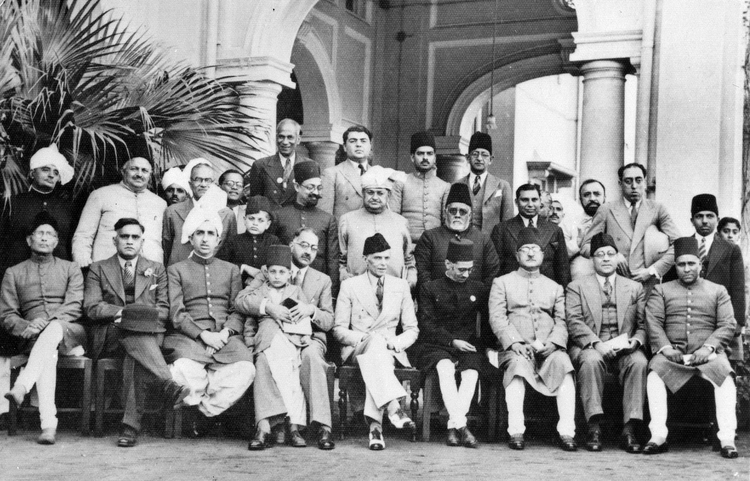
A subset of Founding Fathers of Pakistan met in Lahore in 1940 to discuss the idea of Pakistan.

The Founders and activists of the Pakistan Movement, also known as the Founding Fathers of Pakistan, (Note: Urdu: بانیانِ پاکستان, romanized: Bānīyān-e-Pākistān, lit. 'Founders of Pakistan') were the political leaders and statespersons who participated in the success of the political movement, following the signing of the Pakistan Resolution, that led to the creation of Pakistan in August 1947. Within this large group, a further and extended subset signed the Objectives Resolution that was annexed to the Constitution of Pakistan in 1950.

The term was first used by the linguist and archeologist Dr. Ahmad Hasan Dani in his book, the Founding Fathers of Pakistan (1998). The Pakistan Movement was led by a large group of activists and statesmen who played crucial role in the politics of the British Raj in the 1930s and 1940s. More recently, the term was used by the government officially in explaining the foreign policy text. Authors and historians of Pakistan more broadly define the term "Founding Fathers" to mean a larger group which also includes all those who, whether as politicians, jurists, statespersons, soldiers, diplomats, academics, or ordinary citizens, took part in winning the independence of four provinces and East Pakistan in the north-west and eastern region of British India from the control of the United Kingdom and also from the influence of the Indian Congress; thus creating Pakistan.

The following is a list of people who played a prominent role in the making of Pakistan as independence activists, leaders, freedom fighters and revolutionaries.

== Historical background ==
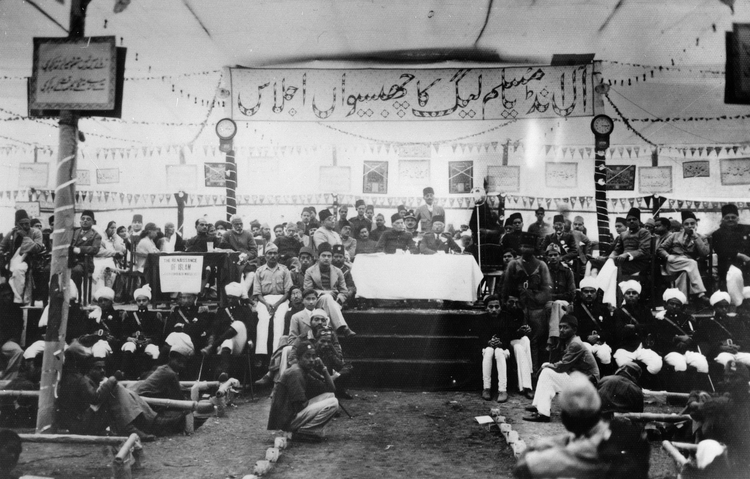
All-India Muslim League's convention held in 1938.

In 1905, the Bengal presidency's partition, decided by the English government which separated the largely Muslim eastern areas from the largely Hindu western areas, was supported by the Muslims communities. The success of the Swadeshi movement led by Indian activists led to the reintegration of the presidency and it was a catalyst in making the Muslim reformers of India realize the need for a separate homeland.

During the same year, the political efforts and initiations led by Sir Syed Ahmad Khan led to the establishment of the historic All-India Muslim League (AIML) to protect the interests and rights of the Muslims of the subcontinent. Mutual distrust among the Hindu leaders and Muslim reformers further grew. A conference chaired by Indian Viceroy, Earl Minto, the Hindu-Muslim conflict was raised to the constitutional plane. In 1906, the annual meeting of the Muhammadan Educational Conference was held in Dhaka led by Nawab Sir Khwaja Salimullah, Nawab Waqar-ul-Mulk, the Aga Khan III and 3,000 other delegates attended the session making it the largest-ever representative gathering of Muslim India. Mohammad Ali Johar wrote the All-India Muslim League's first agenda and Syed Ameer Ali established its European branch in the United Kingdom.

For quite sometime, the Muslim League worked on its reputation and credibility against the much influential Indian Congress. That was not achieved until Liaquat Ali Khan and his companion Begum Rana Liaquat Ali convinced Muhammad Ali Jinnah, among others, to join the Muslim League in the 1930s. The philosophical idea, Pakistan (Iqbal, 1930); the 14 points (Jinnah, 1929); the Now or Never (Ali, 1933); the Two-nation theory, to which subsequently many activists and leaders contributed, played a crucial role in realizing the creation of Pakistan in 1947. Ashraf Ali Thanwi's disciples Shabbir Ahmad Usmani and Zafar Ahmad Usmani were key players in religious support for the creation of Pakistan.

The newly founded country of Pakistan had to create a government and legislature to replace the British India government and the British Parliament. The founding fathers of Pakistan first established the partial Constituent Assembly (which was replaced with Parliament), and adopted the Objectives Resolution, which was annexed to the Constitution of Pakistan.

=== Occupations and Finances ===
The founders and activists of Pakistan had different occupations and came from different social strata, and many pursued more than one career simultaneously. Many founding fathers such as Muhammad Ali Jinnah, Muhammad Zafarullah Khan Liaquat Ali Khan and Qazi Muhammad Isa were barristers and lawyers. Notable activist Dr. Ziauddin Ahmed, was a mathematician who helped in forming the first educational policy of the country. Begum Rana Liaquat Ali Khan was an economist; and Abu Bakr Ahmad Haleem was a political scientist; M. M. Sharif was a philosopher and Shaukat Hayat Khan was an officer in the British Army. The following are a few notable personalities who played an integral role in the success of the Pakistan Movement.

== List of Founders of Pakistan ==
Listed Founders of Pakistan
Name (Birth and date)	Portrait	Place of representation and origin	Pre-independence and Post-independence notability
Muhammad Ali Jinnah (1876–1948)		Karachi, Sindh	Founder of Pakistan; First Governor-General of Pakistan; First President-Speaker of the Constituent Assembly; Presiding figure of the Muslim League
Allama Muhammad Iqbal (1877–1939)		Sialkot, Punjab	Regarded as the spiritual father of Pakistan; Conceived and presented the idea of Pakistan; Formalized the Two-Nation Theory; Philosopher and poet of Urdu and Persian languages
Muhammad Zafarullah Khan (1893–1985)		Wazirabad, Punjab	Pakistani diplomat and jurist who served as the first foreign minister of Pakistan
Ashraf Ali Thanwi (1863–1943)		Thana Bhawan, Muzaffarnagar, Uttar Pradesh	Leader of the Ulama who supported the Pakistan Movement.
Shabbir Ahmad Usmani (1887–1949)		Bijnor, Uttar Pradesh	Key player in nurturing religious support for the creation of Pakistan, Founder of Jamiat Ulema-e-Islam, raised the flag of Pakistan for the first time in Karachi.
Zafar Ahmad Usmani (1892–1974)		Deoband, Uttar Pradesh	Another key player in religious support for the creation of Pakistan, second leader of Jamiat Ulema-e-Islam, raised the flag of Pakistan for the first time in Dhaka.
Aga Khan III (1877–1957)		Karachi, Sindh	Key presiding figure of the Muslim League; Led the Ismailism movement in support of Pakistan movement.
Liaquat Ali Khan (1895–1951)		Karnal, Punjab	First Prime Minister of Pakistan; Author of Objectives Resolution
Fatima Jinnah (1893–1967)		Karachi, Sindh	Regarded as Māder-e-Pakistan; Woman activist Younger sister of Muhammad Ali Jinnah; Leader of the Opposition during 1965 elections
Qazi Muhammad Isa (1914–1976)		Pishin, Balochistan	Organizer of Muslim League in Balochistan and NWFP; Youngest member of Muslim League's working committee
Fazlul Huq (1873–1962)		Barisal, Bengal	Ascended as Interior Minister of Pakistan; Governor of East Pakistan
Khawaja Nazimuddin (1894–1964)		Dhaka, Bengal	First Bengali leader of Pakistan; Second Prime Minister of Pakistan; Second Governor-General of Pakistan
Naseer Ahmad Malhi (1911–1991)		Sialkot, Punjab	First Minister of Education of Pakistan
Rahmat Ali (1897–1951)		Balachaur, Punjab	Coined and created "Pakstan"; Author of Now or Never
Raja Ghazanfar Ali Khan (1895–1963)		Jhelum, Punjab	Leader of Pakistan Movement, close companion of Muhammad Ali Jinnah, minister and diplomat
Muhammad Arif Khan Rajbana Sial (1913–2010)		Jhang, Punjab	Key presiding figure of the Muslim League. Member All-India Constituent Assembly. Chief Party Whip.
G. M. Syed (1904–1995)		Sann, Sindh	Key presiding figure of the Muslim League; Rallied Sindh's support for Pakistan movement
Abdur Rab Nishtar (1899–1958)		Peshawar, Khyber-Pakhtunkhwa	Governor of Punjab; First Minister of communications
Huseyn Suhrawardy (1892–1963)		Dhaka, Bengal	Fifth Prime Minister of Pakistan; Enforcer of One Unit
Mohammad Ali Jouhar (1878–1931)		Rampur, Uttar Pradesh	Muslim cleric and leader of Khilafat Movement; Key presiding figure of the Muslim League
Shaukat Ali (1873–1939)		Rampur, Uttar Pradesh	Muslim cleric and leader of Khilafat Movement; Key presiding figure of the Muslim League
Jalal-ud-din Jalal Baba (1901–1981)		Abbottabad, Khyber Pakhtunkhwa	Founder of Hazara Muslim League; Senior Muslim Leaguer and winner of referendum in NWFP
Zafar Ali Khan (1873–1956)		Wazirabad, Punjab	and Poet of Urdu language
Ra'ana Ali Khan (1905–1990)		Almora, Uttarakhand	Also known as Madar-e-Pakistan First Lady of Pakistan; Governor of Sindh; Initiated Women military corps
Jogendra Nath Mandal (1904–1968)		Barisal, Bengal	First Law Minister of Pakistan
Syed Amir-uddin Kedwaii (1901–1973)		Barabanki, Uttar Pradesh	Designed the Pakistani Flag
Khaliq-uz-Zaman (1889–1963)		Rampur, Uttar Pradesh	Presiding figure of the Muslim League
Jahanara Shahnawaz (1896–1979)		Lahore, Punjab	Crucial role in women legislature after the independence.

=== Notable activists ===
The activities and constant public gathering of founding fathers of Pakistan attracted the people of North-West India to be politically active in the movement. Many of the activists would later becoming the future leader of the country.

Listed activists of Pakistan
Name (Birth and date)	Portrait	Place of representation and origin	Pre-independence and Post-independence notability
Muhammad Asad (1900–1992)		Lemberg, Austria-Hungary	Honorary figure in Pakistan
Sartaj Aziz (1929–2024)		Mardan, Khyber-Pakhtunkhwa	National Security Adviser (2013–Present); Played key role in the political events in Pakistan, including that of nuclear tests in 1998; Professor of Economics at various universities of Pakistan.
Rafiq Tarar (1929-2021)		Gujranwala, Punjab	9th President of Pakistan (1997–2001)
Mir Hazar Khoso (1929-2022)		Jaffarabad, Balochistan	Acting Prime Minister of Pakistan (25 March 2013 – 4 June 2013)
Nurul Amin (1893–1974)		Shahbazpur, Bengal	Prime Minister of Pakistan (7–20 December 1971); Only Vice-president of Pakistan
Shahzada Rehmatullah Khan Durrani (1919-1992)		Quetta, Balochistan	Politician
Alvin Robert Cornelius (1903–1991)		Agra, Uttar Pradesh	Chief Justice of Pakistan (1960–1968)
Pir Gohar (1931–2013)		Mardan, Khyber Pakhtunkhwa	Poet and critic (19xx–2013)
Sheikh Mujibur Rahman (1920–1975)		then Faridpur, Bengal	The leader of Pakistan's majority party in the 1970 elections and later the founder and president of Bangladesh.

== See also ==
- Pakistan
- Dominion of Pakistan
- Muhammad Ali Jinnah
- Indian independence activists
- List of presidents of the All-India Muslim League
