= List of presidents of the All-India Muslim League =

President of the All-India Muslim League
- Flag of the All-India Muslim League

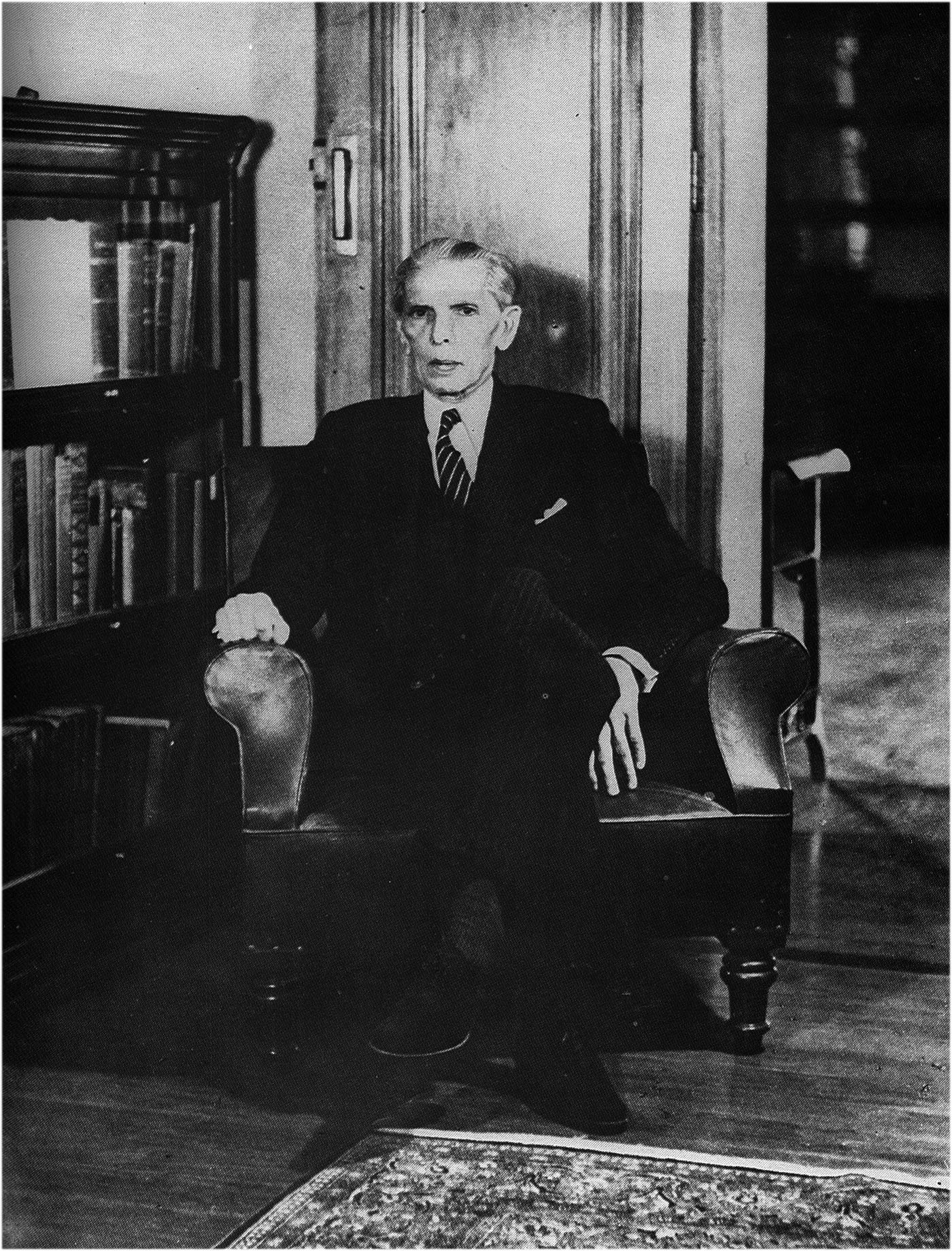
- Longest serving Muhammad Ali Jinnah; 24 December 1913 – 14 August 1947
- Abbreviation: AIML President; President of AIML
- Residence: South Court, Malabar Hill, Bombay
- Seat: Calcutta; Dacca
- Term length: Not fixed
- Formation: 30 December 1906; 119 years ago
- First holder: Khwaja Salimullah
- Final holder: Muhammad Ali Jinnah
- Abolished: 14 August 1947; 79 years ago
- Succession: Governor-General of Pakistan
- Unofficial names: President of the Muslim League

The All-India Muslim League (popularised as the Muslim League) was a political party established in 1906 in British India. The first session of the party was held in Karachi in 1907. Muhammad Ali Jinnah joined the league in 1913. In 1927 the League was divided into two factions regarding the issue of a joint electorates. Those who supported the joint electorates were led by Muhammad Ali Jinnah (known as Jinnah League) and those who opposed were led by Sir Muhammad Shafi (Shafi League). In 1931 the party again split into two when Muhammad Ali Jinnah moved to London abandoning politics. The two factions were led by Abdul Aziz and Hafiz Hidayat. The two factions merged again when Jinnah returned to India in 1934. The last session was held in Karachi in 1943 and was presided by Muhammad Ali Jinnah. Many Muslim leaders were invited to meet at Dhaka . They met under the chairmanship of Waqar-ul-Mulk who justified the organisation of the Muslims in a separate body . A long discussion over this subject led to the foundation of the Muslim League in 1906 under the leadership of the "Agha Khan, the Nawab of Dhaka" and Nawab Mohsin-ul-Mulk.

== List of party presidents ==
Session	Date	Presided by	Location	Notable Resolutions	Ref
1st	29-30 Dec 1907	Adamjee Peerbhoy	Karachi	Resolution was passed to formulate the Rules, Regulations and Code of Conduct of the All-India Muslim League.	
1st (Adjourned Session)	18–19 March 1908	Mian Shah Din	Aligarh	Resolution passed to approved financial support to the British Committee.	
2nd	30-31 Dec 1908	Sir Syed Ali Imam	Amritsar	Resolution passed demanding Muslim representation Government services.	
3rd	29-30 Jan 1910	Sir Ghulam Muhammad Ali	Delhi	Resolutions passed seeking restoration of the importance of Urdu in the U.P. and the Punjab and demanding free primary education.	
4th	28-30 Dec 1910	Syed Nabiullah	Nagpur	Resolutions passed demanding extension of communal representation to all self-governing public bodies and in the administration.	
5th	3–4 March 1912	Khwaja Salimullah	Calcutta	Resolutions passed urging upon the government the desirability of Jinnah’s bill regarding Wakfs being passed into law.	
6th	22–23 March 1913	Mian Muhammad Shafi	Lucknow	The session made amendments in its constitution and decided to join in on calls for ‘self-government’	
7th	30-31 Dec 1913	Sir Ibrahim Rahimtoola	Agra	Resolutions passed concerning creation of Muslim League National Fund. Muhammad Ali Jinnah also participated in this session.	
8th	30 Dec 1915 – 1 Jan 1916	Maulana Mazharul Haque	Bombay	The session agreed for a joint session with Indian National Congress to formulate a Joint Scheme of Reforms.	
9th	30-31 Dec 1916	Muhammad Ali Jinnah	Lucknow	The session approved the Joint Scheme of Reforms formulated by the Congress and League representatives. Popularly known as the Lucknow Pact	
10th	30 Dec 1917 – 1 Jan 1918	Mohammad Ali Jauhar (absent, in detention)	Calcutta	Resolutions passed demanding release of Mohammad Ali Jauhar, Shaukat Ali, Maulana Azad, Maulana Hasrat Nomani from detention.	
Special Session	31 Aug - 1 Sep 1918	Mohammad Ali Mohammad Khan	Bombay	A resolution registered the League’s emphatic protest at the insinuation contained in the Report of the Montagu–Chelmsford Reforms that "the people of India are unfit for responsible government".	
11th	30-31 Dec 1918	A. K. Fazlul Huq	Delhi	Session strongly protested against the occupation of Jerusalem and Najaf-i-Ashraf and other Holy places by the British forces during the Battle of Jerusalem.	
12th	29-31 Dec 1919	Hakim Ajmal Khan	Amritsar	Resolutions passed demanding retention of Urdu language and Persian characters in the courts; and justice in the Jallianwala Bagh case. The session welcomed the Government of India Act 1919 but regretted the denial of self government.	
Extraordinary session	7 September 1920	Muhammad Ali Jinnah	Calcutta	Session attended by many Congress and Hindu leader condemned the imposition of Rowlatt Act	
13th	30-31 Dec 1920	M. A. Ansari	Nagpur	Resolution was passed to include the attainment of Swaraj by the people of India by all peaceful and legitimate means among the AIML objects. The session welcomed the establishment of Jamia Millia Islamia at Aligarh.	
14th	30-31 Dec 1921	Maulana Hasrat Mohani	Ahmedabad	Hasrat Mohani proposed the establishment of an Indian Republic or a United States of India.	
15th	31 March - 1 April 1923	G. M. Bhurgri	Lucknow	Jinnah’s resolution recommending entry into Councils was debated for five hours without a definite conclusion.	
15th Adjourned Session	24–25 May 1924	Muhammad Ali Jinnah	Lahore	Resolutions passed condemning Hindu-Muslim riots and rejection of the Government of India Act 1919.	
16th	30- 31 Dec 1924	Syed Raza Ali	Bombay	Resolutions passed condemning the promulgation of Bengal Criminal Law Amendment, 1924.	
17th	30 - 31 Dec 1925	Abdur Rahim	Aligarh	Resolution passed concerning the demand of the AIML for the amendment of the constitution, and appointment of a committee on constitutional advancement.	
18th	29-31 Dec 1926	Abdul Qadir	Delhi	Resolutions passed demanding removal of anti-Indian legislation in South Africa.	
19th (Jinnah League)	30 Dec 1927 – 1 Jan 1928	Muhammad Yaqub Ali	Calcutta	Resolutions passed announcing the rejection of Simon Commission; electing Mohammad Ali Jinnah as President of AIML for 3 years; condemning Sir Muhammad Shafi and Punjab Provincial Muslim League for rebelling against the parent body.	
19th (Shafi League)	31 Dec 1927 – 1 Jan 1928	Mian Muhammad Shafi	Lahore	Resolutions passed for joining All Parties Conference for a joint Draft Constitution for India, supporting the Simon Commission.	
20th	26-30 Dec 1928	Mohammad Ali Mohammad Khan	Calcutta	Resolutions passed forming a delegation to attend the Convention called by the Indian National Congress to resolve questions regarding the Nehru Report; declining to send a delegation to the All India Azad Muslim Conference, terming it as a reactionary organization.	
21st	29-30 Dec 1930	Muhammad Iqbal	Allahabad	Resolution passed declaring Simon Commission as a failure. Muhammad Iqbal delivered the Allahabad Address.	
22nd	26-27 Dec 1931	Muhammad Zafarullah Khan	Delhi	Resolutions passed concerning the statement of the Prime Minister at the Round Table Conference on 1 December 1931.	
23rd (Aziz League)	21 October 1933	Mian Abdul Aziz	Howrah	Resolutions passed welcoming the Communal Award and recording dissatisfaction lower representation for Muslims in the legislature.	
23rd (Hidayat League)	25-26 Nov 1933	Hafiz Hidayat Hussain	Delhi	Resolutions passed supporting extended franchise for women.	
24th	11–12 April 1936	Syed Wazir Hasan	Bombay	Resolutions passed appointing a committee to amend the rules of the AIML.	
25th	15-18 Oct 1937	Muhammad Ali Jinnah	Lucknow	Resolutions passed for the "establishment of full independence in the form of a federation of free democratic states in which interests of the Muslims and other minorities are adequately effectively safeguarded in the Constitution"; condemning the demolition of the Shaheed Ganj Mosque at Lahore and disapproving the scheme of All-India Federation as embodied in the Government of India Act 1935.	
Special Session	17–18 April 1938	Muhammad Ali Jinnah	Calcutta	Resolutions passed appreciating the assurance of the Government to get an honourable solution of the Shaheed Ganj dispute	
26th	26-29 Dec 1938	Muhammad Ali Jinnah	Patna	Resolutions passed declaring Balfour Declaration in respect of Palestine as unjust.	
27th	22–24 March 1940	Muhammad Ali Jinnah	Lahore	The session passed the Lahore Resolution	
28th	12–15 April 1941	Muhammad Ali Jinnah	Madras	Resolutions passed reiterating the demand for "Pakistan" and terming the Congress’ Civil Disobedience Movement as aiming at the consolidation of Hindu power in India	
29th	3–6 April 1942	Muhammad Ali Jinnah	Allahabad	Resolutions passed endorsing A.K. Fazlul Huq’s expulsion from the League and demanding lifting of the ban on the Khaksar Movement.	
30th	24–26 April 1943	Muhammad Ali Jinnah	Delhi	Resolutions passed condemning martial law against the Hur community in Sindh.	
31st	24-26 Dec 1943	Muhammad Ali Jinnah	Karachi	Resolution passed demanding the formation of Pakistan.	

== See also ==
- Pakistan Movement
- List of Pakistan Movement activists
