= Syed Ameer Ali =

Indian jurist (1849–1928)

Syed Ameer Ali CSI
- Portrait by Walter Stoneman, 1917
- Born: 6 April 1849; Cuttack, Bengal, British India
- Died: 3 August 1928 (aged 79); Sussex, England, United Kingdom
- Spouse: Isabelle Ida Konstam (m. 1884)
- Children: 2
- Relatives: Mahbub Ali Khan (grandnephew)

Education
- Education: University of Calcutta

Philosophical work
- Era: Islamic modernism
- Region: Muslim scholar in British India and United Kingdom
- Notable works: The Spirit of Islam

Syed Ameer Ali CSI (6 April 1849 – 3 August 1928) was an Indian jurist, a prominent political leader, and the author of a number of influential books on Muslim history and the modern development of Islam.

He hailed from the State of Oudh, from where his father moved and settled down in the Bengal Presidency, and is credited for his contributions to the Law of India, particularly Muslim personal law, as well as the development of political philosophy for Muslims, during the British Raj.

He was a signatory to the 1906 Petition to the Viceroy and was thus a founding member of the All India Muslim League. He played a key role in securing separate electorates for the Muslims in British India and promoting the cause of the Khilafat Movement.

== Family background ==
He was born on 6 April 1849, toward the end of the Mughal Empire in India, at Cuttack in Odisha as the fourth of five sons of Syed Saadat Ali (d. 1856) from Mohan in Unnao of Oudh State. The Shiite family traced its descent to Muhammad through his daughter Fatima from Imam Ali al-Rida, his great-grandfather having moved to India from Khorasan in 1739, during Nadir Shah's Indian campaign.

His father settled in Cuttack after Ameer Ali's grandfather (who worked in the service of Asaf-ud-Daulah - the Nawab of Awadh) died in 1820. There he married the daughter of Shamsuddin Khan, one of the nobles of Sambalpur. He would later move the family to Calcutta, and then to Chinsura where they settled more permanently. His family took advantage of the educational facilities provided by the British government but was otherwise shunned by the Muslim community. He received his initial education at Hooghly Mohsin College, and with the assistance of his British teachers and supported by several competitive scholarships, he achieved outstanding examination results, graduating from Calcutta University in 1867, and gaining an MA degree with Honours in history in 1868. The LLB degree followed quickly in 1869. He then began legal practice in Calcutta. By this time, he was already one of the few outstanding Muslim achievers of his generation.

== Political career ==
After moving to London, where he stayed between 1869 and 1873, he joined the Inner Temple (one of four professional associations for barristers and judges) and made contacts with some people of London. He absorbed the influence of contemporary liberalism. He had contacts with almost all the administrators concerned with India and with leading English liberals such as John Bright and the Fawcetts, Henry (1831–1898) and his wife, Millicent Fawcett (1847–1929.)

Syed Ameer Ali resumed his legal practice at Calcutta High Court on his return to India in 1873. The year after, he was elected as a Fellow of Calcutta University as well as being appointed as a lecturer in Islamic Law at the Presidency College, Kolkata. In 1878, he was appointed as a member of the Bengal Legislative Council. He revisited England in 1880 for one year.

He became a professor of law at Calcutta University in 1881. In 1883, he was nominated to the membership of the Governor General Council. In 1890, he was made a judge in the Calcutta High Court. Earlier he had founded the political organization, Central National Muhammedan Association, in Calcutta in 1877. This association later spread nationwide, with 34 branches from Madras to Karachi. This made him the first Muslim leader to put into practice the need for such an organisation due to the belief that efforts directed through an organisation would be more effective than those originating from an individual leader. The Association played an important role in the modernization of Muslims and in arousing their political consciousness. He was associated with it for over 25 years and worked for the political advancement of the Muslims.

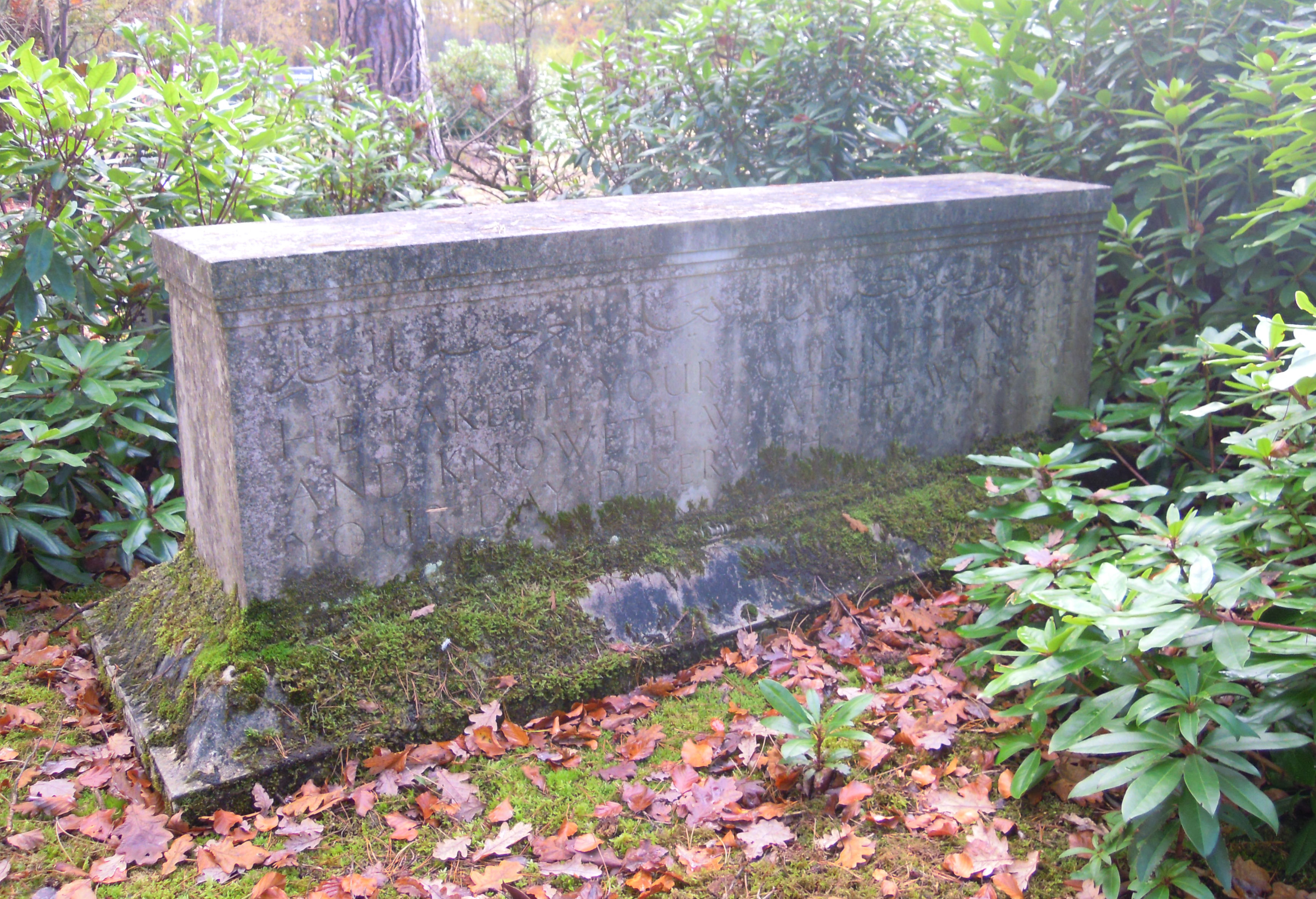
Syed Ameer Ali's grave in Brookwood Cemetery

Syed Ameer Ali established the London Muslim League in 1908. This organisation was an independent body and not a branch of the All India Muslim League. In 1909, he became the first Indian to sit as a member of the Judicial Committee of the Privy Council, on which he would serve till his death in 1928. On appointment to the Privy Council, he became entitled to be addressed as The Right Honourable.

In 1908, he was an advisory member to the Muhammadan Art and Life in Turkey, Persia, Egypt, Morocco and India exhibition held at the Whitechapel Gallery. The Autumn Exhibition was held from 23 October to 6 December. The opening day for the public was on 27th Ramadan.

In 1910, he formally co-established the London Mosque Fund, alongside a group of prominent British Muslims, to finance the building of the first mosque in the capital: East London Mosque, today one of the largest mosques in Europe. His field of activities was now broadened, and he stood for Muslim welfare all over the world. He played an important role in securing separate electorates for the Muslims in India and promoting the cause of the Khilafat Movement.

He retired from Calcutta High Court in 1904 and decided to settle down with his English wife (Isabelle Ida Konstam) in England, where he was somewhat isolated from the main current of Muslim political life. Throughout his career, he was known as a jurist and a well-known Islamic scholar. He died on 4 August 1928 in Sussex (Rudgwick) and was buried in Brookwood Cemetery.

== Personal beliefs ==
Syed Ameer Ali believed that the Muslims, as a downtrodden nation, could get more benefit from loyalty to the British rather than from any opposition to them. For this reason, he called upon his followers to devote their energy and attention to popularising English education among the Muslims. This perception and consequent activism have been known as the Aligarh Movement.

Referring to polygamy, Syed Ameer Ali wrote:

Each age has its own standard. What is suited for one time is not suited for the other.

== Opinions and legacy ==
David Samuel Margoliouth, in the preface of his book Mohammed and the Rise of Islam, wrote:

The charming and eloquent treatise of Syed Ameer Ali [The Spirit of Islam] is probably the best achievement in the way of an apology for Mohammed that is ever likely to be composed in a European language.

Syed Ameer Ali, like some other authors of his time, tried to show that Islam was a rational religion.

== Honors and recognition ==
The Sayed Ameer Ali Hall in the University of Rajshahi in Bangladesh is named for him.

Pakistan Postal Service issued a commemorative postage stamp in 1990 to honor him in its 'Pioneers of Freedom' series.

== See also ==
- The Nineteenth Century (periodical), for which Ameer Ali authored articles
- Judicial Committee of the Privy Council
- Shia Islam in India

== Books ==
- A Critical Examination of the Life and Teachings of Mohammed (1873) – His first book, written when he was 24, while in England. The orientalist Major R. D. Osborn (1835–1889) wrote: "Regarded simply as a literary achievement, we have never read anything issuing from the educated classes in this country which could be compared with it; and the Muslims of India are to be congratulated on the possession of so able a man in their rank. It is impossible if his after-life accords with this early promise that he should not leave his influence for good stamped upon the country in deep and enduring characters."
- The Personal Law of Muhammedans (1880)
- The Spirit of Islam (editions in 1891, 1922, 1953) – A book covering the life of Muhammad, and the political, cultural, literary, scientific, mystic, philosophical, and social history of Islam.
- Ethics of Islam (1893)
- A Short History of Saracens (1899)
- Islam (1906)
- The Legal Position of Women in Islam (1912)
