= Robert Osborn =

Robert or Bob Osborn may refer to:

== Sports ==
- Bob Osborn (1903–1960), American baseball player
- Bob Osborn (1924–?), coach of Cal State Fullerton Titans tennis
- R. L. Osborn (Robert Lewis Osborn, born 1963), American motorcyclist

== Others ==
- Robert Osborn (newspaper editor) (1800–1878), Jamaican newspaper editor and activist
- Robert Osborn (satirist) (1904–1994), American cartoonist
- Robert Osborn (judge) (born 1951), Australian jurist
- Robert Durie Osborn (1835–1889), India-born British army officer

== See also ==
- Robert Osborne (disambiguation)
- John Robert Osborn (1899–1941), English-born Canadian VC recipient
- Osborn (surname)
