= All-India Muslim League =

Muslim political party in British India

All-India Muslim League آل انڈیا مسلم لیگ
- Abbreviation: AIML
- President: Muhammad Ali Jinnah (4 March 1934 – 15 December 1947); Aga Khan III (18 March 1908 – 3 November 1913)
- General Secretary: Liaquat Ali Khan (12 April 1936 – 15 December 1947)
- Session President(s): List: Adamjee Peerbhoy (1907); Mian Shah Din (1908); Syed Ali Imam (1908); Aga Khan III (1910); Syed Nabiullah (1910); Khwaja Salimullah (1912); Mian Muhammad Shafi (1913); Ibrahim Rahimtoola (1913); Mazharul Haque (1915–1916); Muhammad Ali Jinnah (1916); Mohammad Ali Jauhar (1917–1918); Mohammad Ali Mohammad Khan (1918); A. K. Fazlul Huq (1918); Hakim Ajmal Khan (1919); Muhammad Ali Jinnah (1920); Mukhtar Ahmed Ansari (1920); Hasrat Mohani (1921); G. M. Bhurgri (1923); Muhammad Ali Jinnah (1924); Raza Ali Khan (1924); Abdur Rahim (1925); Abdul Qadir (1926); Muhammad Yaqub Ali (1927–1928); Mian Muhammad Shafi (1927–1928); Mohammad Ali Mohammad Khan (1928); Muhammad Iqbal (1930); Zafrulla Khan (1931); Mian Abdul Aziz (1933); Hafiz Hidayat Hussain (1933); Syed Wazir Hasan (1936); Muhammad Ali Jinnah (1937, 1938, 1938, 1941, 1942, 1943, 1943)
- Founders: Khwaja Salimullah; Hakim Ajmal Khan; Waqar-ul-Mulk; Mohsin-ul-Mulk; Aga Khan III; Syed Ameer Ali; Mian Muhammad Shafi; Mohammad Ali Jauhar; ... and others
- Founded: 30 December 1906; 119 years ago Israt Manzil Palace, Dacca, Bengal Presidency, British India
- Dissolved: 15 December 1947; 78 years ago Khaliq Dina Hall, Karachi, Sind, Pakistan
- Succeeded by: All-Pakistan Muslim League; Indian Union Muslim League
- Headquarters: Karachi, Sind, Pakistan (1947); Lucknow, United Provinces, British India (1910–1947); Aligarh, United Provinces, British India (1906–1910)
- Newspaper: Dawn
- Student wing: All-India Muslim Students Federation
- Women's wing: All-India Muslim Ladies Conference
- Paramilitary wing: All-India Muslim National Guards
- Membership: 400 (1906); 2 million (1943)
- Ideology: Separatism; Muslim nationalism (South Asian); Islamic modernism; Two-nation theory; Factions: Conservatism; Islamic socialism; Regionalism
- Religion: Islam
- Political alliance: Lucknow Pact (1916); Jinnah–Sikandar Pact (1937)
- Colors: Green; White
- Slogan: Pakistan Zindabad ('Long live Pakistan') (unofficial)
- Constituent Assembly of Pakistan (1947): 59 / 69
- Constituent Assembly of India (1946): 73 / 296

Election symbol
- Crescent and Star

Party flag

The All-India Muslim League (or AIML) was a political party in British India active between 1906 and 1947 that advocated for Muslim interests. The party emerged from the Aligarh Movement and the broader Islamic modernist and communalist traditions, which sought to preserve the distinct social and political identity of Muslims against the more secular policies of the Indian National Congress. In December 1906, following the successful Simla Deputation in October, the All-India Muslim League was founded in the 20th session of the All-India Muhammadan Educational Conference in Dacca (modern-day Dhaka). It created and spearheaded the movement for the creation of Pakistan based upon the two-nation theory of the Indian scholar Syed Ahmad Khan.

The party arose out of the need for the political representation of Muslims in British India, especially during the Indian National Congress-led opposition to the 1905 partition of Bengal. During the 1906 annual meeting of the All-India Muhammadan Education Conference held in Ahsan Manzil Palace in Dacca, the Nawab of Dacca, Khwaja Salimullah, forwarded a proposal to create a political party which would protect the interests of Muslims in British India. He suggested the political party be named the 'All-India Muslim League'. The motion was unanimously passed by the conference, leading to the official formation of the All-India Muslim League in Dacca. It remained an elitist organisation until 1937, when the leadership, under the command of Muhammad Ali Jinnah, began mobilising the Muslim masses, which turned the League into a popular organisation. The Muslim League played a decisive role in the 1940s, becoming a driving force behind the partition of India along religious lines and the creation of Pakistan as a Muslim state in 1947. After the partition of India and the creation of Pakistan, the All-India Muslim League was formally disbanded.

The party was succeeded by Muslim League in Pakistan and Indian Union Muslim League in India. The Muslim League in Pakistan was banned in 1958 but revived as the Pakistan Muslim League in 1962 and has since split into several political parties. In India, the Indian Union Muslim League remains active in the state of Kerala. In East Pakistan, now Bangladesh, it was succeeded by the All Pakistan Awami Muslim League now the Awami League.

== Foundation ==
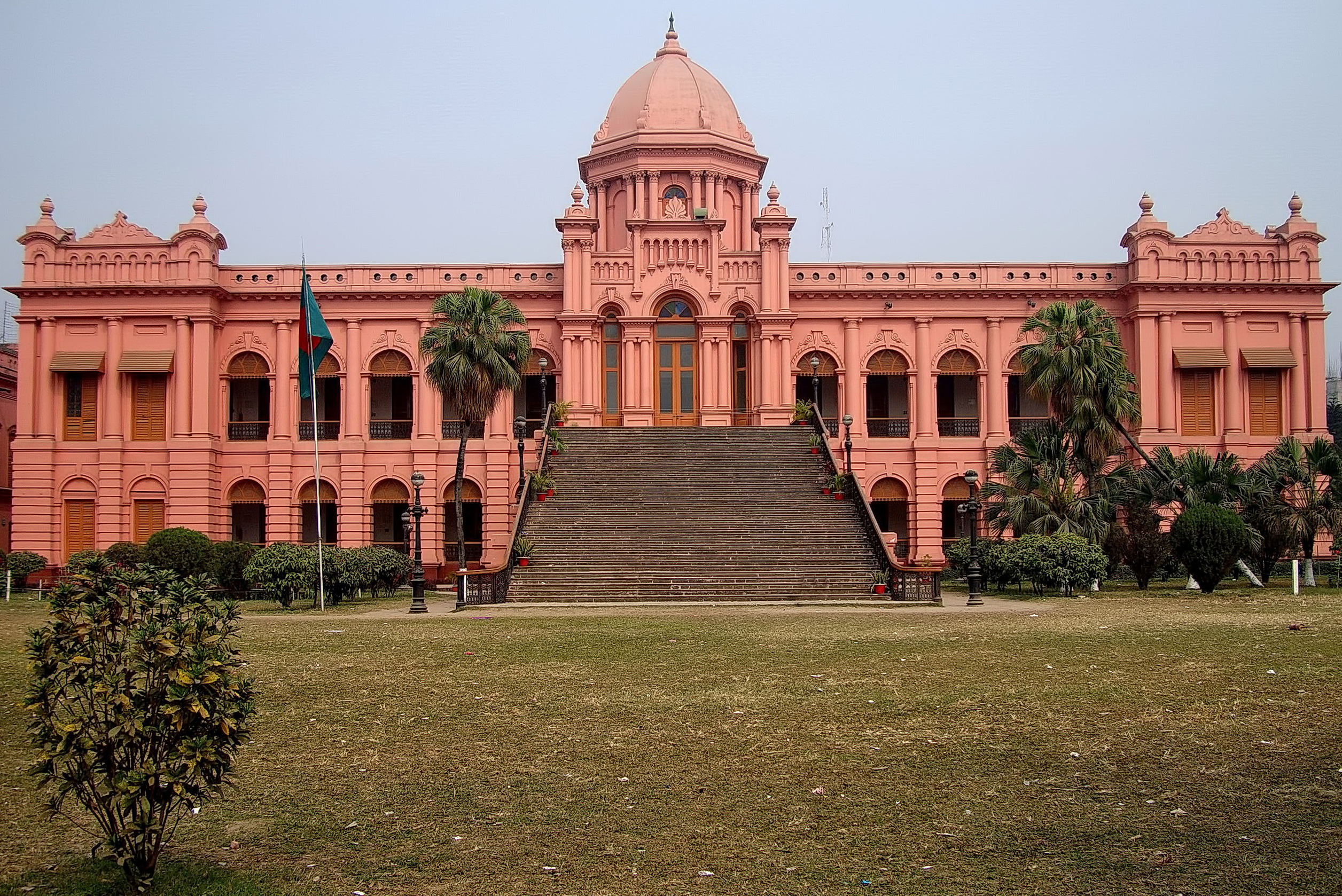
Ahsan Manzil, birthplace of All-India Muslim League in 1906

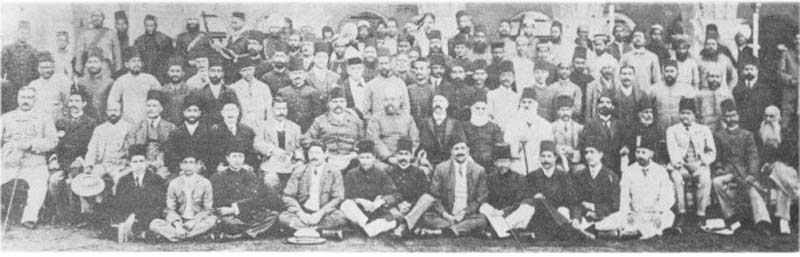
The AIME Conference in 1906, held at the Ahsan Manzil palace of the Dhaka Nawab Family, laid the foundation of the Muslim League.

With the sincere efforts by the pioneers of the Congress to attract Muslims to their sessions, the majority of the Islamic leadership, except for a few scholars (like Syed Ahmad Khan and Syed Ameer Ali, who focused more on Islamic education and scientific developments), rejected the notion that India has two distinct communities to be represented separately in Congress sessions.

Syed Ahmad Khan, in 1888, at Meerut, said, "After this long preface, I wish to explain what method my nation — nay, rather the whole people of this country — ought to pursue in political matters. I will treat in regular sequence of the political questions of India, in order that you may have a full opportunity of giving your attention to them. The first of all is this — In whose hands shall the administration and the Empire of India rest? Now, suppose that all English, and the whole English army, were to leave India, taking with them all their cannon and their splendid weapons and everything, then who would be the rulers of India? Is it possible that under these circumstances two nations — the Mahomedans and the Hindus — could sit on the same throne and remain equal in power? Most certainly not. It is necessary that one of them should conquer the other and thrust it down. To hope that both could remain equal is to desire the impossible and the inconceivable."

In 1886, Sir Syed founded the All-India Muhammadan Educational Conference, but a self-imposed ban prevented it from discussing politics. Its original goal was to advocate for British education, especially science and literature, among India's Muslims. The conference, in addition to generating funds for Sir Syed's Aligarh Muslim University, motivated the Muslim upper class to propose an expansion of educational uplift elsewhere, known as the Aligarh Movement. In turn, this new awareness of Muslim needs helped stimulate a political consciousness among Muslim elites. For a few of them, many years after the death of Sir Syed Ahmad Khan, the All-India Muslim League was formed in Dhaka, Bangladesh.

The formation of a Muslim political party on the national level was seen as essential by 1901. The first stage of its formation was the meeting held at Lucknow in September 1906, with representatives from all over India in attendance. The decision to reconsider the formation of the all-Indian Muslim political party was taken, and further proceedings were adjourned until the next meeting of the All India Muhammadan Educational Conference. The Simla Deputation reconsidered the issue in October 1906 and decided to frame the party's objectives on the occasion of the annual meeting of the Educational Conference, which was scheduled to be held in Dhaka. Meanwhile, Nawab Salimullah Khan published a detailed scheme suggesting that the party be named the All-India Muslim Confederacy.

Pursuant to the decisions that had been taken earlier at the Lucknow meeting and later in Simla, the annual meeting of the All-India Muhammadan Educational Conference was held in Dhaka from 27 December until 30 December 1906. Three thousand delegates attended, headed by both Waqar-ul-Mulk and Nawab Mohsin-ul-Mulk (the Secretary of the All-India Muhammadan Educational Conference), in which they explained its objectives and stressed the unity of Muslims under the banner of an association. It was formally proposed by Khwaja Salimullah and supported by Hakim Ajmal Khan, Mohammad Ali Jauhar, Zafar Ali Khan, Syed Nabiullah, a barrister from Lucknow, Ibraheem Fazili, and Syed Zahur Ahmad, an eminent lawyer, as well as several others.

=== Separate electorates ===
The Muslim League's insistence on separate electorates and reserved seats in the Imperial Council was granted in the Indian Councils Act after the League held protests in India and lobbied London.

The draft proposals for the reforms communicated on 1 October 1908 provided Muslims with reserved seats in all councils, with nominations only being maintained in Punjab. The communication was a clear indicator of how much the Government had accommodated Muslim demands and reflected an increase in Muslim representation in the Imperial and provincial legislatures. But the Muslim League's demands were only fully met in UP and Madras. However, the Government did accept the idea of separate electorates. The idea had not been accepted by the Secretary of State, who proposed mixed electoral colleges, causing the Muslim League to agitate and the Muslim press to protest what they perceived to be a betrayal of the Viceroy's assurance to the Simla deputation.

On 23 February, Morley told the House of Lords that Muslims demanded separate representation and accepted them. This was the League's first victory. But the Indian Councils Bill did not fully satisfy the demands of the Muslim League. It was based on the October 1908 communique in which Muslims were only given a few reserved seats. The Muslim League's London branch opposed the bill and, in a debate, obtained the support of several parliamentarians. In 1909, the members of the Muslim League organised a Muslim protest. The Reforms Committee of Minto's council believed that Muslims had a point and advised Minto to discuss with some Muslim leaders. The Government offered a few more seats to Muslims in compromise, but would not agree to all of the League's demands.

Minto believed that the Muslims had been given enough, while Morley was still not certain because of the pressure Muslims could apply on the government. On 12 September 1909, the Muslim League's central committee once again demanded separate electorates and more representation. While Minto was opposed, Morley feared that the Bill would not pass parliament without the League's support, and he once again discussed Muslim representation with the League leadership. This was successful. The Aga Khan compromised so that Muslims would have two more reserved seats in the Imperial Council. The Muslim League hesitantly accepted the compromise.

== Early years ==
Sultan Muhammad Shah (Aga Khan III) was appointed the first honorary president of the Muslim League, though he did not attend the Dhaka inaugural session. There were also six vice-presidents, a secretary, and two joint secretaries, initially appointed for a three-year term, proportionate to the representation from different provinces. The League's constitution was framed in 1907, espoused in the "Green Book," written by Mohammad Ali Jauhar.

Aga Khan III shared Ahmad Khan's belief that Muslims should first build up their social capital through advanced education before engaging in politics, but would later boldly tell the British Raj that Muslims must be considered a separate nation within India. Even after he resigned as president of the AIML in 1912, he continued to exerted a significant influence on its policies and agendas. In 1913, Muhammad Ali Jinnah joined the Muslim league.

Intellectual support and a cadre of young activists emerged from Aligarh Muslim University. Historian Mushirul Hasan writes that in the early 20th century, this Muslim institution, designed to prepare students for service to the British Raj, exploded into political activity. Until 1939, the faculty and students supported an all-India nationalist movement. After 1939, however, sentiment shifted dramatically toward a Muslim separatist movement, as students and faculty mobilised behind Jinnah and the Muslim League.

=== Growth of Communalism ===
Politically, there was a degree of unity between Muslim and Hindu leaders after World War I, as typified by the Khilafat Movement. Relationships cooled sharply after that campaign ended in 1922. Communalism grew rapidly, forcing the two groups apart. Major riots broke out in numerous cities, including 91 between 1923 and 1927 in Uttar Pradesh alone. At the leadership level, the proportion of Muslims among delegates to the Congress party fell sharply, from 11% in 1921 to under 4% in 1923.

The two-state solution was rejected by the Congress leaders, who favoured a united India based on a composite national identity. Congress at all times rejected "communalism" — that is, basing politics on religious identity. Iqbal's policy of uniting the North-West Frontier Province, Balochistan, Punjab, and Sindh into a new Muslim majority state became part of the League's political platform.

The League rejected the Committee report (the Nehru Report), arguing that it gave too little representation (only one quarter) to Muslims, established Devanagari as the official writing system of the colony, and demanded that India turn into a de facto unitary state, with residuary powers resting at the centre – the League had demanded at least one-third representation in the legislature and sizeable autonomy for the Muslim provinces. Jinnah reported a "parting of the ways" after his requests for minor amendments to the proposal were denied outright, and relations between the Congress and the League began to sour.

== Conception of Pakistan ==
In November 1930, when all the prominent leaders of AIML, including Muhammad Ali Jinnah, were invited by the British Prime Minister, Ramsay MacDonald, for the Round Table Conference (1ST RTC), Muhammad Iqbal was invited to give the presidential address of AIML in Allahabad in which nothing new was proposed. Some scholars argued that "Iqbal never pleaded for any kind of partition of the country. Rather he was an ardent proponent of a 'true' federal setup for India..., and wanted a consolidated Muslim majority within the Indian Federation."

Another Indian historian, Tara Chand, also held that Iqbal was not thinking in terms of partition of India, but in terms of a federation of autonomous states within India. Historian Safdar Mahmood also wrote in a series of articles that in the Allahabad address, Iqbal proposed a Muslim majority province within an Indian federation. Iqbal did not, at that time, back an independent state outside an Indian Federation.

On 28 January 1933, Choudhry Rahmat Ali, founder of the Pakistan National Movement, voiced his ideas in the pamphlet entitled "Now or Never". In a subsequent book, he discussed the etymology in further detail: "'Pakistan' is both a Persian and an Urdu word. It is composed of letters taken from the names of all our homelands ... That is, Panjab, Afghania (North-West Frontier Province), Kashmir, Iran, Sindh (including Kutch and Kathiawar), Tukharistan, Afghanistan, and Balochistan."

The British and the Indian press vehemently criticised these two different schemes and created confusion about the authorship of the word "Pakistan" to such an extent that even Jawaharlal Nehru had to write:

Iqbal was one of the early advocates of Pakistan and yet he appears to have realised its inherent danger and absurdity. Edward Thompson has written that in the course of a conversation, Iqbal told him that he had advocated Pakistan because of his position as President of Muslim League session, but he felt sure that it would be injurious to India as a whole and to Muslims especially.

== Campaign for Pakistan ==
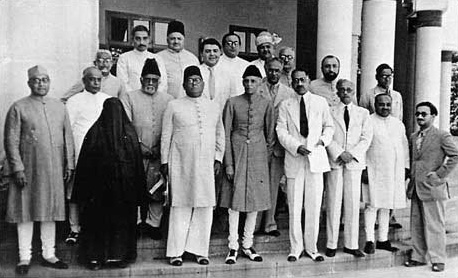
Muslim League Working Committee at the Lahore session

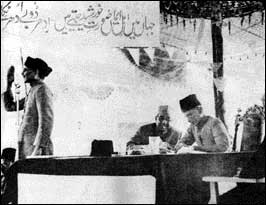
Chaudhry Khaliquzzaman seconded the Resolution with Jinnah and Liaquat presiding over the session.

The Muslim League's earliest base was the United Provinces. There local leaders successfully mobilised Muslims in the late 1930s. Until 1937, the Muslim League remained an organisation of elite Indian Muslims. The Muslim League leadership then began mass mobilisation and it then became a popular party with the Muslim masses in the 1940s, especially after the Lahore Resolution. Under Jinnah's leadership, its membership grew to over two million and became more religious and even separatist in its outlook.

From 1937 onwards, the Muslim League and Jinnah attracted large crowds throughout India in its processions and strikes. It did not yet have enough authority, however, to overcome tensions within the Muslim community, such as those exhibited during the Madhe Sahaba Agitation between 1938 and 1939 in Lucknow.

At a League conference in Lahore in 1940, Jinnah said:

Hindus and Muslims belong to two different religious philosophies, social customs, literature... It is quite clear that Hindus and Mussalmans derive their inspiration from different sources of history. They have different epics, different heroes and different episodes ... To yoke together two such nations under a single state, one as a numerical minority and the other as a majority must lead to growing discontent and final destruction of any fabric that may be so built up for the government of such a state.

In Lahore, the Muslim League formally recommitted itself to creating an independent Muslim state which would include Sindh, Punjab, Baluchistan, the North West Frontier Province, and Bengal, and which would be "wholly autonomous and sovereign". The Lahore Resolution, moved by the sitting Chief Minister of Bengal A. K. Fazlul Huq, was adopted on 23 March 1940, and its principles formed the foundation for Pakistan's first constitution. In the Indian provincial elections of 1946, the Muslim League won 425 out of 476 seats reserved for Muslims (and about 89.2% of Muslim votes) on a policy of creating the independent state of Pakistan, and with an implied threat of secession if this was not granted. Congress, led by Gandhi and Nehru, remained adamantly opposed to dividing India.

In opposition to the Lahore Resolution, the All India Azad Muslim Conference gathered in Delhi in April 1940 to voice its support for a united India. Its members included several Islamic organisations in India, as well as 1400 nationalist Muslim delegates; the "attendance at the Nationalist meeting was about five times than the attendance at the League meeting." The All-India Muslim League worked to try to silence those Muslims who stood against the partition of India, often using "intimidation and coercion". For example, Deobandi scholar Hussain Ahmad Madani travelled across British India, spreading the idea he wrote about in his book, Composite Nationalism and Islam, which stood for Hindu-Muslim unity and opposed the concept of a partition of India; while he was doing this, members of the pro-separatist Muslim League attacked Madani and disturbed his rallies. The murder of the All India Azad Muslim Conference leader Allah Bakhsh Soomro in 1943 further solidified the All-India Muslim League to demand the creation of Pakistan.

=== Role in communal violence ===
In the British Indian province of Sind, the historian Ayesha Jalal describes the actions that the pro-separatist Muslim League used in order to spread communal division and undermine the elected government of Allah Bakhsh Soomro, which stood for a united India:

Even before the 'Pakistan' demand was articulated, the dispute over the Sukkur Manzilgah had been fabricated by provincial Leaguers to unsettle Allah Bakhsh Soomro's ministry which was dependent on support from the Congress and Independent Party. Intended as a way station for Mughal troops on the move, the Manzilgah included a small mosque which had been subsequently abandoned. On a small island in the near distance was the temple of Saad Bela, sacred space for the large number of Hindus settled on the banks of the Indus at Sukkur. The symbolic convergence of the identity and sovereignty over a forgotten mosque provided ammunition for those seeking office at the provincial level. Making an issue out of a non-issue, the Sind Muslim League in early June 1939 formally reclaimed the mosque. Once its deadline of 1 October 1939 for the restoration of the mosque to Muslims had passed, the League started an agitation.

Prior to this, in Sind, the All India Muslim League secured only 4.6% of the vote in the 1937 Indian provincial elections, in contrast to the winning Sind United Party, which stood for Hindu-Muslim unity. Twenty-seven out of thirty-four Muslim seats were won by the Sind United Party.

In the few years before the partition, the Muslim League was accused of "monetarily subsidizing" mobs that engaged in communal violence against Hindus and Sikhs in the areas of Multan, Rawalpindi, Campbellpur, Jhelum and Sargodha, as well as in the Hazara District. The Muslim League led mobs reportedly paid assassins money for every Hindu and Sikh killed. As such, leaders of the Muslim League, including Muhammad Ali Jinnah, issued no condemnation of the violence against Hindus and Sikhs in Punjab.

== Legacy ==
=== Pakistan ===
After the partition of the British Indian Empire, the Muslim League played a major role in giving birth to modern conservatism in Pakistan and the introduction of the democratic process in the country.

The Pakistani incarnation was originally led by the founder of Pakistan, Muhammad Ali Jinnah, and later by Prime Minister Liaquat Ali Khan, but suffered from ill-fate following the military intervention in 1958. One of its factions remained supportive of President Ayub Khan until 1962, when all factions decided to reform into the Pakistan Muslim League led by Nurul Amin, and to support Fatima Jinnah in the presidential elections in 1965. Furthermore, it was the only party to have received votes from both East and West Pakistan during the elections held in 1970. During the successive periods of Pakistan, the Pakistan Muslim League went on to be one of the ruling parties holding alternating power within the nation.

=== India ===
After the partition of India in 1947, the All-India Muslim League was disbanded. It was succeeded by Indian Union Muslim League in the new India.

Indian Union Muslim League contests Indian General Elections under the Indian Constitution. The party has always had a constant, if small presence, in the Indian Parliament. The party has had two members in every Lower House from the third to the 16th House, with the exception of the Second, in which it had no members, and the fourth, in which it had three members. The party had a single member in the 14th Lower House. The party currently has four members in Parliament. The party is currently a part of the United Progressive Alliance at the national level.

Indian Union Muslim League is recognised by the Election Commission of India as a State Party in Kerala. The party is a major member of the opposition United Democratic Front, the Indian National Congress-lead pre-poll state-level alliance in Kerala. Whenever the United Democratic Front rules in Kerala, the party leaders are chosen as important Cabinet Ministers.

=== Bangladesh ===
The Muslim League formed its government in East Bengal immediately after the partition of Bengal, with Khawaja Nazimuddin becoming the first Chief Minister.

Problems in East Pakistan for the Muslim League began to rise following the issue of the Constitution of Pakistan. Furthermore, the Bengali language movement proved to be the last event that led the Muslim League to lose its mandate in East Bengal. The Muslim League's national conservatism program also faced several setbacks and resistance from the Communist Party of Pakistan. In an interview given to print media, Nurul Amin stated that the communists had played an integral and major role in staging the massive protests, mass demonstrations, and strikes for the Bengali Language Movement.

All over the country, the political parties had favoured the general elections in Pakistan with the exception of the Muslim League. In 1954, legislative elections were to be held for the Parliament. Unlike in West Punjab, not all of the Hindu population migrated to India, instead a large number stayed in the state. The influence of the Communist Party deepened, and its goal of attaining power was finally realised during the elections. The United Front, the Communist Party, and the Awami League returned to power, inflicting a severe defeat to the Muslim League. Out of 309, the Muslim League only won 10 seats, whereas the Communist Party got 4 seats of the ten contested. The communists working with other parties had secured 22 additional seats, totalling 26. The right-wing Jamaat-e-Islami had completely failed in the elections.

In 1955, the United Front named Abu Hussain Sarkar as the Chief Minister of the State and he ruled the state in two non-consecutive terms until 1958, when martial law was imposed. The Muslim League remained as a minor party in East Pakistan but participated with full rigour during the Pakistan general elections in 1970. It won 10 seats from East Pakistan and 7 seats from other parts of Pakistan. After the independence of Bangladesh, the Muslim League was revived in 1976 but its size was reduced, rendering it insignificant in the political arena.

=== United Kingdom ===
During the 1940s, the Muslim League had a United Kingdom chapter active in the British politics. After the establishment of Pakistan, the Pakistani community's leaders took over the UK branch, choosing Zubeida Habib Rahimtoola as president of the party to continue to serve its purpose in the United Kingdom. At present, the Muslim League's UK branch is led by the PML-N, with Zubair Gull as its president.

== Election results ==
=== Central Legislative Assembly ===
Election year	Party leader	Leader's constituency	Seats won	+/–	Notes
1934	Muhammad Ali Jinnah	Bombay City (Muslim)	25 / 140	–	
1945	Muhammad Ali Jinnah	Bombay City (Muslim)	30 / 102	▲5	

=== Council of State ===
Election year	Party leader	Leader's seat	Seats won	+/–	Notes
1934	Syed Hussain Imam	Bihar and Orissa (Muhammadan)	6 / 42	–	
1945	Syed Hussain Imam	Bihar and Orissa (Muhammadan)	10 / 60	▲4	

=== Constituent Assembly ===
Election year	Party leader	Leader's constituency	Seats won	+/–	Notes
1946	Muhammad Ali Jinnah	Punjab (Muslim)	73 / 296	–	
1947	Muhammad Ali Jinnah	West Punjab	59 / 69	▼14	

=== Assam Legislative Assembly ===
Election year	Party leader	Leader's constituency	Seats won	+/–	Notes
1937	Abdul Matin Chaudhury	Sylhet Sadar (East)	10 / 108	–	
1946	Abdul Matin Chaudhury	Sylhet Sadar (East)	38 / 108	▲28	

=== Bengal Legislative Assembly ===
Election year	Party leader	Leader's constituency	Seats won	+/–	Notes
1937	Khwaja Nazimuddin		40 / 250	–	
1946	Huseyn Suhrawardy		113 / 250	▲73	

=== Bihar Legislative Assembly ===
Election year	Party leader	Leader's constituency	Seats won	+/–	Notes
1937	–		0 / 152	–	
1946	Syed Hussain Imam	Bihar (Muslim)	34 / 152	▲34	

=== Bombay Legislative Assembly ===
Election year	Party leader	Leader's constituency	Seats won	+/–	Notes
1937	Ali Muhammad Khan Dehlavi		18 / 175	–	
1946	I. I. Chundrigar		18 / 175	–	

=== Central Provinces and Berar Legislative Assembly ===
Election year	Party leader	Leader's constituency	Seats won	+/–	Notes
1937	Syed Abdur Rauf Shah		5 / 113	–	
1946	Syed Abdur Rauf Shah		13 / 112	▲8	

=== Madras Legislative Assembly ===
Election year	Party leader	Leader's constituency	Seats won	+/–	Notes
1937	B. Pocker	Kurumbranad-Kozhikkode	9 / 215	–	
1946	M. Muhammad Ismail	Madras	28 / 215	▲17	

=== North-West Frontier Province Legislative Assembly ===
Election year	Party leader	Leader's constituency	Seats won	+/–	Notes
1937	Khan Bakht Jamal Khan		0 / 50	–	
1946	Abdul Qayyum Khan		17 / 50	▲17	

=== Orissa Legislative Assembly ===
Election year	Party leader	Leader's constituency	Seats won	+/–	Notes
1937	–		0 / 60	–	
1946	Muhammed Abdus Subhan Khan		4 / 60	▲4	

=== Punjab Legislative Assembly ===
Election year	Party leader	Leader's constituency	Seats won	+/–	Notes
1937	Malik Barkat Ali		2 / 175	–	
1946	Iftikhar Hussain Khan Mamdot		72 / 175	▲71	

=== Sind Legislative Assembly ===
Election year	Party leader	Leader's constituency	Seats won	+/–	Notes
1937	–		0 / 60	–	
1946	Ghulam Hussain Hidayatullah		28 / 60	▲28	

=== United Provinces Legislative Assembly ===
Election year	Party leader	Leader's constituency	Seats won	+/–	Notes
1937	Chaudhry Khaliquzzaman		27 / 228	–	
1946	Chaudhry Khaliquzzaman		54 / 228	▲27	

== See also ==
- Indian Independence Movement
- Muslim nationalism in South Asia
- List of Pakistan Movement activists
- Muslim League schisms
