= Robert Osborne (disambiguation) =

Robert Osborne (1932–2017) was an American film historian, TV presenter, and actor.

Robert Osborne may also refer to:

- R. Travis Osborne (1913–2013), American psychologist
- Bobby Osborne (1931–2023), bluegrass musician
- Robert Osborne (basketball) in Canada men's national basketball team
- Robert Osborne (Victoria cricketer) (1881–1927), Australian cricketer, played cricket for Victoria, 1904–05
- Robert Osborne (New South Wales cricketer) (1897–1975), Australian cricketer, played cricket for New South Wales, 1924–27
- Robert M. Osborne (1852–1931), newspaper editor and proprietor in South Australia

== See also ==
- Robert Osborn (disambiguation)
- Robert Osborne-Smith (1908–1972), cricketer
