= Urdu Defence Association =

The Urdu Defence Association was an organisation developed by Mohsin-ul-Mulk, starting in 1900, for the advocacy of Urdu as the lingua franca of the Muslim community of India. The association is regarded as an offshoot of the Aligarh Movement.

== Background ==
During the last days of the Muslim rule in Indian Sub-continent, Urdu (with Perso-Arabic script) emerged as the most common language of the northwestern provinces of India. Its vocabulary developed under Persian, Arabic, Turkic, and Sanskrit influence. Urdu had taken almost 900 years to develop to its present form. It began taking shape during the Delhi Sultanate as well as Mughal Empire (1526–1858) in South Asia. Urdu was mainly developed in Delhi and its surrounding areas which was the seat of Royal court of the Indian subcontinent. It also became a language of Muslim nobility. After Persian language, it was most widely used in the Mughal Royal Court. It was declared the official language, and all official records were written in this language. In 1876, some Hindus began to demand that Hindi should be made an official language in place of Urdu, and they started a movement in Banaras in which they demanded the replacement of Urdu with Hindi, and the Perso-Arabic script with the Devanagari, script as the court language in the northwestern provinces. The reason for opposing Urdu was that the language was written in Persian script, which was similar to the Arabic script, and Arabic was the language of the Quran, the Holy Book of the Muslims. The movement grew quickly and within a few months spread throughout the Hindu population of the northwestern provinces of India. The headquarters of this movement were in Allahabad.

This situation provoked the Muslims to come out in order to protect the importance of the Urdu language. The opposition by the Hindus towards the Urdu language made it clear to the Muslims of the region that Hindus were not ready to tolerate the culture and traditions of the Muslims.

The Urdu-Hindi controversy had a great effect on the life of Sir Syed Ahmad Khan. Before this event he had been a great advocate of Hindu-Muslim unity and was of the opinion that the "two nations are like two eyes of the beautiful bride, India". But this movement completely altered his point of view. He put forward the Two-Nation Theory, predicting that the differences between the two groups would increase with the passage of time and the two communities would not join together in anything wholeheartedly.

== Vision of Sir Syed Ahmed Khan ==
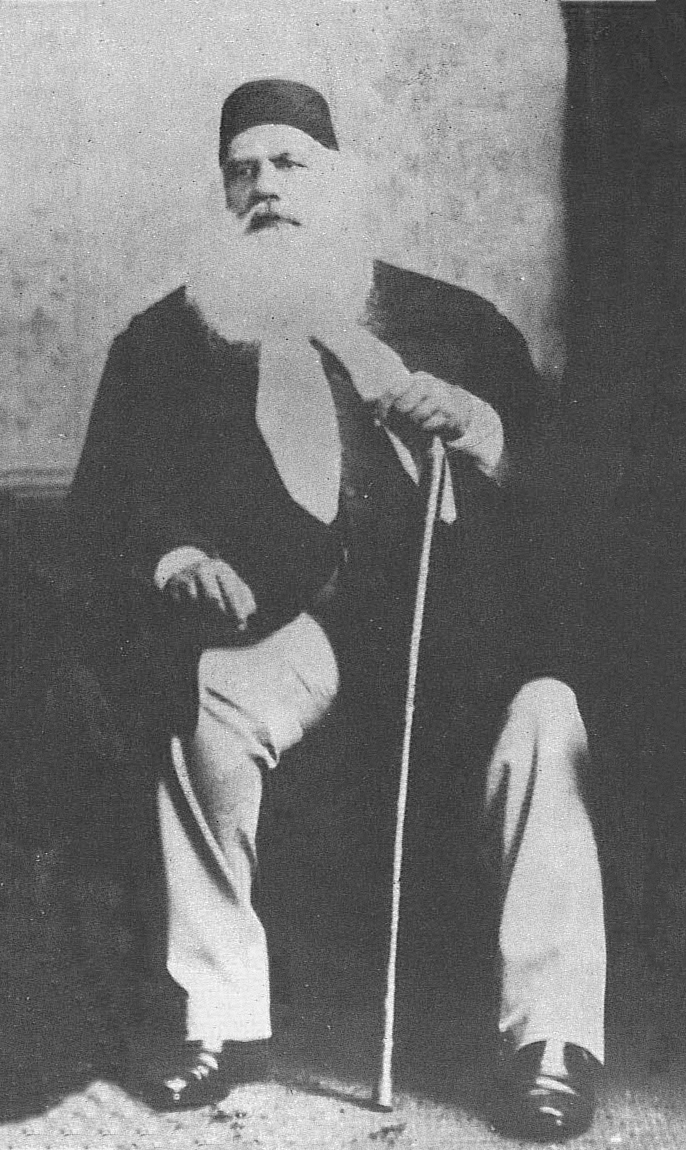
Sir Syed Ahmed Khan

Sir Syed Ahmed Khan perceived Urdu as the lingua franca of Muslims. Having been developed by Muslim rulers of India, Urdu was used as a secondary language to Persian, the official language of the Mughal court. Since the decline of the Mughal dynasty, Sir Syed promoted the use of Urdu through his own writings. Under Sir Syed, the Scientific Society translated Western works only into Urdu. The schools established by Sir Syed imparted education in the Urdu medium. The demand for Hindi, led largely by Hindus, was to Sir Syed an erosion of the centuries-old Muslim cultural domination of India. Testifying before the British-appointed education commission, Sir Syed controversially exclaimed that "Urdu was the language of gentry and Hindi that of the vulgar." His remarks provoked a hostile response from Hindu leaders, who unified across the nation to demand the recognition of Hindi.

Khan had once stated, "I look to both Hindus and Muslims with the same eyes & consider them as two eyes of a bride. By the word nation I only mean Hindus and Muslims and nothing else. We Hindus and Muslims live together on the same soil under the same government. Our interest and problems are common and therefore I consider the two factions as one nation." Speaking to Mr. Shakespeare, the governor of Banaras, after the language controversy heated up, he said "I am now convinced that the Hindus and Muslims could never become one nation as their religion and way of life was quite distinct from one another."

Sir Syed later said "now I am convinced that both these communities will not join whole heartedly in anything. At present there is no open hostility between the two communities but it will increase immensely in the future."

In the last three decades of the 19th century, the controversy flared up several times in North-Western provinces and Oudh. The Hunter commission, appointed by the Government of India to review the progress of education, was used by the advocates of both Hindi and Urdu for their respective causes.

== Nawab Mohsin-ul-Mulk ==
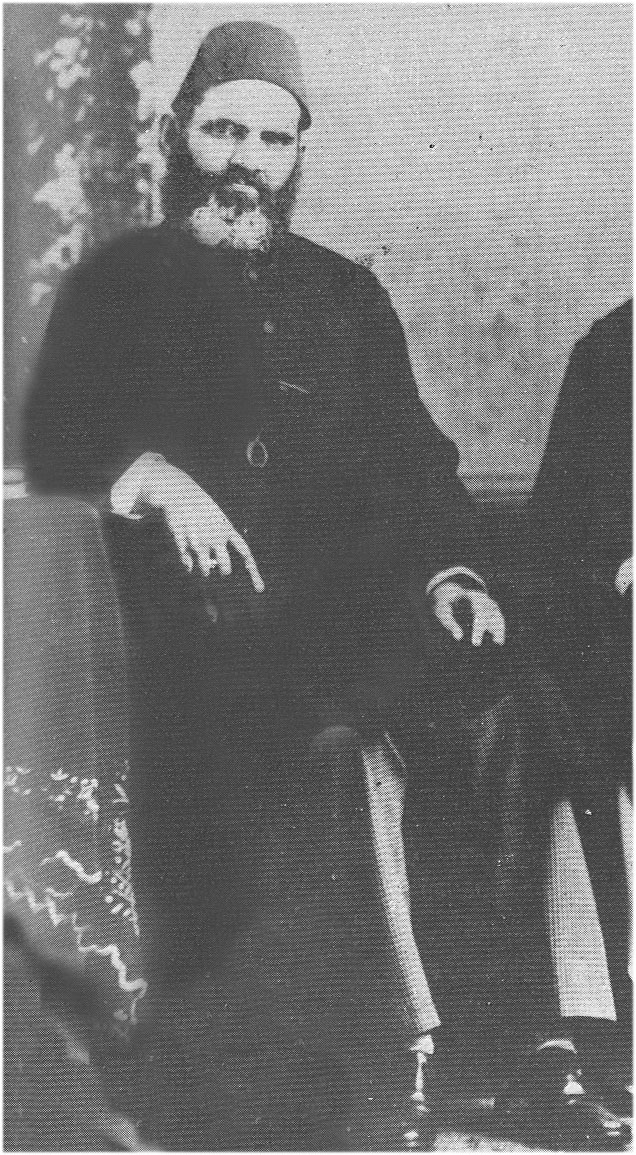
Nawab Mohsin ul Mulk

Later the followers of Sir Syed tried their level best to save the Urdu language. Mohsin-ul-Mulk was the outstanding person who organized the Muslims in defense of Urdu. Towards the beginning of the 20th century, the Hindi-Urdu controversy again flared up in the United Provinces. Mohsin-ul-Mulk took up the pen in defense of Urdu in collaboration with the Urdu Defense Association.

Earlier, the success of the Hindi movement led Sir Syed to further advocate Urdu as the symbol of Muslim heritage and as the language of all Indian Muslims. His educational and political work grew increasingly centered on and exclusively for Muslim interests. He also sought to persuade the British to give Urdu extensive official use and patronage. His colleagues and protégés such as Mohsin-ul-Mulk and Maulvi Abdul Haq developed organisations such as the Urdu Defence Association and the Anjuman Taraqqi-i-Urdu, committed to the perpetuation of Urdu. Sir Syed's protégé Shibli Nomani led efforts that resulted in the adoption of Urdu as the official language of the Hyderabad State and as the medium of instruction in the Osmania University. To Muslims in northern and western India, Urdu had become an integral part of political and cultural identity. However, the division over the use of Hindi or Urdu further provoked communal conflict between Muslims and Hindus in India.

Sir Syed Ahmed Khan and Nawab Mohsin-ul-Mulk's patronage of Urdu led to its widespread use amongst Indian Muslim communities and following the partition of India, its adoption as the national language of Pakistan.
