= Mohsin-ul-Mulk =

Indian Muslim politician (1837–1907)

Nawab Mohsin-ul-Mulk
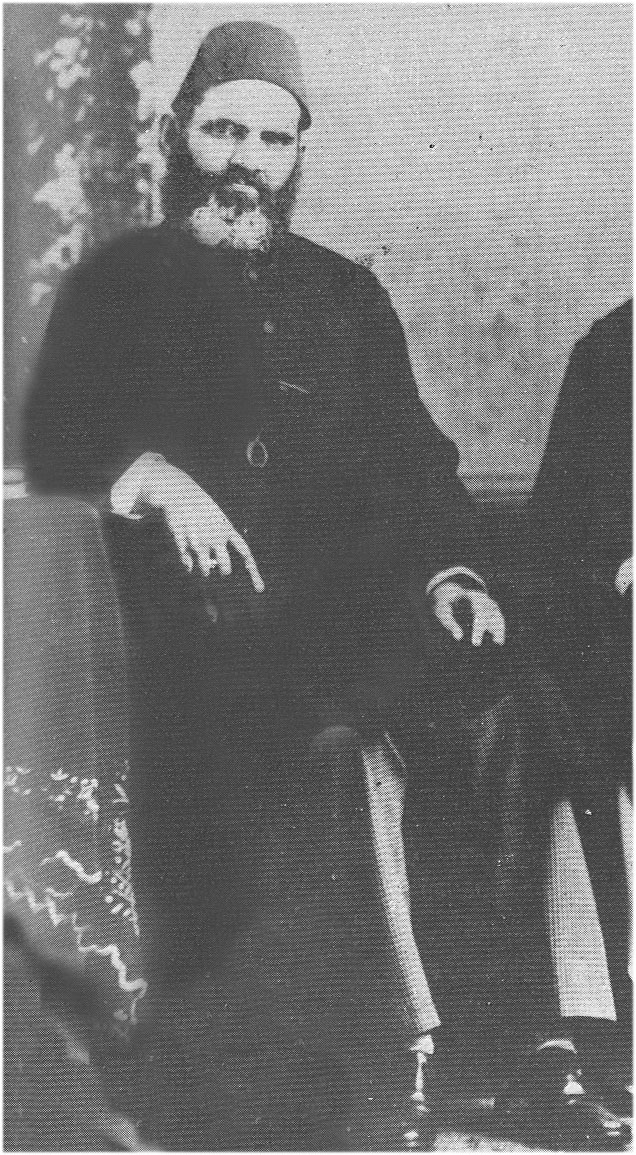
- Born: 9 December 1837; Etawah, North-Western Provinces, Company India
- Died: 16 October 1907 (aged 69); Simla, Punjab, British India
- Other names: Syed Mir Mehdi Ali, Munir Nawaz Jang
- Citizenship: British India
- Known for: Contributions towards development of Aligarh Muslim University, and founding of All India Muslim League in 1906

Nawab Mohsin-ul-Mulk, Munir Nawaz Jang, given name Syed Mir Mehdi Ali (Urdu: نواب محسن الملک، منیر نواز جنگ، سید مہدی علی) (born 9 December 1837 – 16 October 1907), was an Indian Muslim politician. He was a close friend of Syed Ahmed Khan, was involved in the Aligarh Movement and was one of the founders of the All India Muslim League in 1906.

== Family and early life ==
Syed Mir Mehdi Ali was born on 9 December 1837 in the town of Etawah, Uttar Pradesh, British India as the son of Syed Mir Zaamin Ali. He belonged to a branch of the Sadaat-e-Bara tribe in Etawah. Most of his early education was in and around Etawah. As was common in those days, he received a thorough basic education in Persian and Arabic.

In 1867, he sat for the Provincial Civil Service examination and topped the list of successful candidates. He was appointed as Deputy Collector in the North-Western Provinces. His first posting as Deputy Collector was in Mirzapur district (present-day Uttar Pradesh). His elder brother was Syed Mir Ghulam Abbas and younger brother was Syed Mir Amir Hassan. In 1874, Syed Mir Mehdi Ali proceeded to Hyderabad to enter into the service of the Nizam. For his meritorious service for more than a decade, he was granted the titles of Munir Nawaz Jang in 1884 and Nawab Mohsin-ul-Mulk in 1887, by the Nizam of Hyderabad. Mohsin-ul-Mulk converted to Sunnism despite being born a Shia and authored the book Ayat-i Bayanat in which he showed why the Sunni faith was preferable.

== Relationship with Syed Ahmed Khan ==
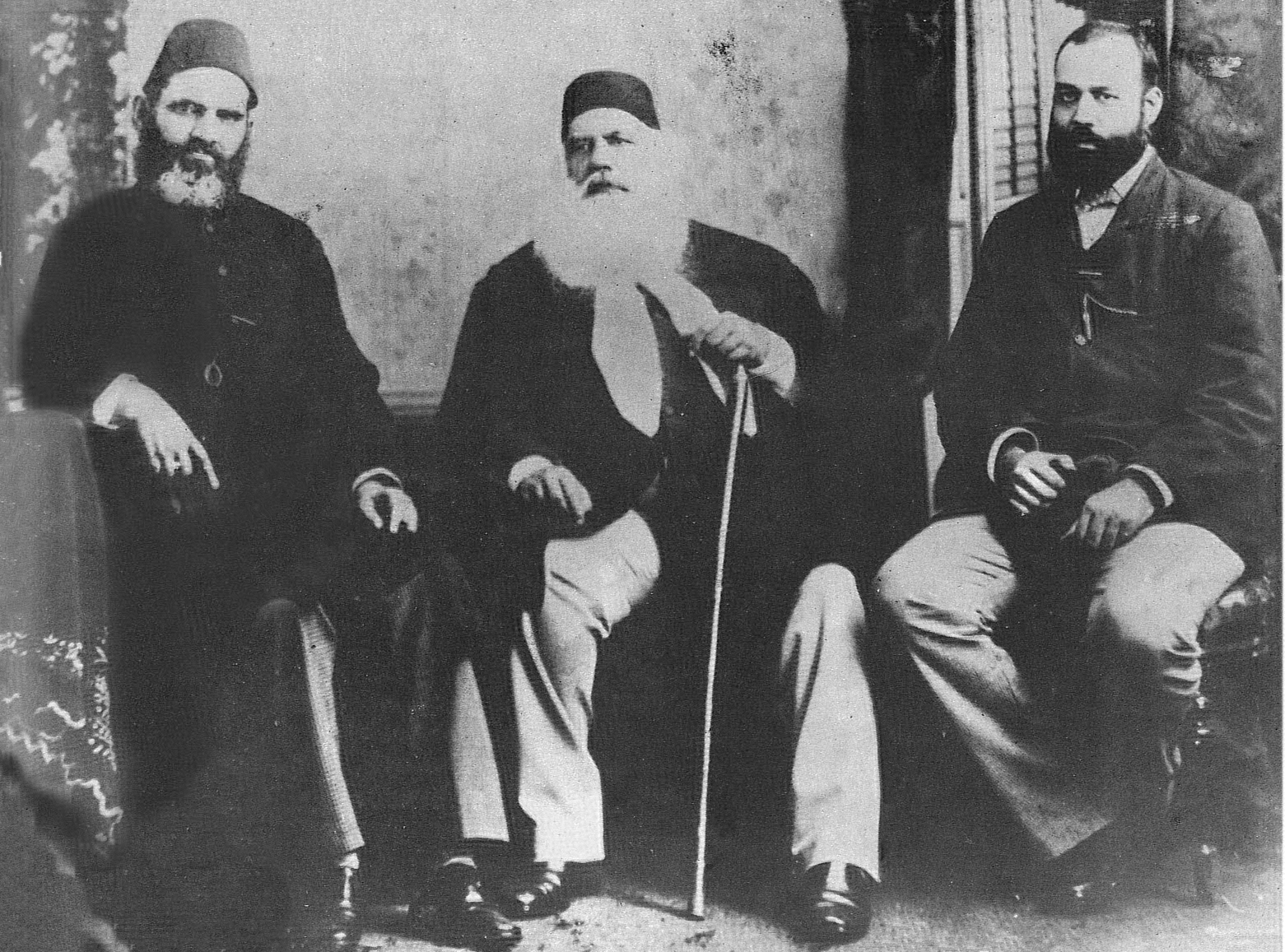
Nawab Mohsin-ul-Mulk, Syed Ahmed Khan, Justice Syed Mahmood, he was the first Muslim to serve as a High Court judge in the British Raj.

He was serving as a Tehsildar in Etawah, When Mohsin-ul-Mulk met Syed Ahmad Khan for the first time. This meeting resulted in a long lasting companionship and Nawab Mohsinul Mulk became a staunch supporter of Syed's vision and mission for the rest of his life. Despite their differences of opinion, Mohsin-ul-Mulk retained a very high level of respect for him, and became one of the strongest supporters of Syed's mission and Aligarh Movement.

He became a member of the Scientific Society from its inception in 1864. He wrote passionate articles in Tahzeebul Akhlaq to support Syed's vision and spread his mission and became a spokesperson of Syed's social thoughts and the Aligarh Movement.

When Syed Ahmed Khan formed The Committee of the Supporters of the Advancement of Muslim Education, Nawab Mohsin-ul-Mulk was his key companion, and started collecting donations for the cause of the newly formed committee.

After 19 years of service, he retired in 1893 from State of Hyderabad, he came to Aligarh and offered his services to Syed Ahmad Khan to assist him in spreading the message of Aligarh Movement. Upon the death of Syed, he was appointed as the Secretary of the Muslim Educational Conference in 1899.

After Syed's death in 1898, he became Secretary of the MAO College management and took Syed's burden on his own shoulders and was given as much respect as his forerunner. He continued the mission of Syed while paying special attention to bringing religious and oriental stream scholars together on one platform, i.e. the MAO College so that the students could benefit from the scholars to have a proper understanding of religion alongside modern scientific education. He appointed a committee under the Chairmanship of Maulana Habibur Rahman Khan Sherwani to improve the religious studies courses at MAO College.

Mohsin-ul-Mulk remained the Secretary until his death in 1907. He was thus instrumental in the development of MAO College, which eventually became the Aligarh Muslim University in 1920.

In later years, the Aligarh Muslim University (AMU) honored him by naming a hall of residence for students after him. The foundation stone of the Hall was laid by the then Vice Chancellor, Mr. Badruddin Mohsin Tyabji on 4 November 1963. It started with an initial strength of 400 and is now one of the largest student residential halls both in size and strength, having 900 students and six different hostels: Allama Shibli Hostel (Previously this was Sir Ziauddin Hostel), Ameen Hostel, Majaz Hostel, Maulana Hali Hostel, Maulana Mohammad Ali Jauhar Hostel, and Saifi Hostel.

== Political involvements ==
Nawab Mohsin-ul-Mulk carried on correspondence with the private secretary of the Viceroy to give his point of view on the necessity of separate representation for the Muslims in all legislatures and local bodies. He presided over the ninth session of Muhammadan Educational Conference which was held in Aligarh in 1894 where he proposed a resolution to help and support Darul Uloom Nadwatul Ulama, the newly formed religious school in Lucknow. His impressive presidential remarks softened the hearts of modern educationists to support the cause of Nadwatul Ulama.

In 1906, he became Secretary of All India Muslim League at its founding session in Dhaka. Along with Nawab Waqar-ul-Mulk Kamboh, he was asked to draft the constitution of the League.

At the beginning of the 20th century, the Hindi-Urdu controversy arose in the United Provinces. Mohsin-ul-Mulk took up the pen in defense of Urdu in collaboration with the Urdu Defense Association.

He authored the following books;

- Mazaameen-e-Tahzeebul Akhlaq (Collection of his articles published in Tahzeebul Akhlaq)
- Taqleed-e-Amal
- Kitabul Muhabbat-o-Shauq Makaateeb
- Musalmano(n) ki Tahzeeb
- Aayaat-e-Bayyināt

== Urdu Defence Association ==
The followers of Syed Ahmad Khan tried their best to save the Urdu language. Mohsin-ul-Mulk was an outstanding person who organized the Muslims in defense of Urdu language. Towards the beginning of the 20th century, the Hindi-Urdu controversy again flared up in the United Provinces. Mohsin-ul-Mulk took up the pen in defense of Urdu in collaboration with the Urdu Defense Association.

Earlier, the success of the Hindi movement led Syed to further advocate Urdu as the symbol of Muslim heritage and as the language of all Indian Muslims. His educational and political work grew increasingly centered on and exclusively for Muslim interests. He also sought to persuade the British to give Urdu extensive official use and patronage. His colleague, Nawab Mohsin-ul-Mulk] established Urdu Defence Association, committed to the perpetuation of Urdu and became its founding president. To Muslims in northern and western India, Urdu had become an integral part of political and cultural identity. However, the division over the use of Hindi or Urdu further provoked communal conflict between Muslims and Hindus in India.

Syed Ahmed Khan and Nawab Mohsin-ul-Mulk's patronage of Urdu led to its widespread use amongst elite Indian Muslim communities and following the Partition of India its adoption as the national language of Pakistan.

== Death ==
Mohsin-ul-Mulk died from chronic diabetes at age 69 on 16 October 1907 at Simla, Punjab, British India.

== Commemorative postage stamp ==
Pakistan Post issued a commemorative postage stamp to honor him in 1990 in its 'Pioneers of Freedom' series.

== Sources ==
- Hayat-e-Mohsin, a biography of Mohsin-ul-Mulk by Mr. Amin Zuberi : 1934
