= Pir Gohar =

Pakistani poet, critic, songwriter

- پیر گوہر
- Born: December 8, 1931; Pirano Daga, Mardan, Khyber Pakhtunkhwa
- Died: January 4, 2013 (aged 81); Pirano Daga, Mardan, Khyber Pakhtunkhwa
- Resting place: Ancestral cemetery, Pirano Daga, Mardan
- Education: Master's degree
- Occupations: Poet; Critic; Songwriter; Freedom activist
- Writing career
- Pen name: Shilmani; Silani; Shaer-i-Aman
- Language: Pashto
- Years active: 19xx–2013
- Period: Movement for the Restoration of Democracy; Operation Fair Play; Military coups in Pakistan
- Genres: Gazal; Song; Drama
- Subjects: Politics, Literature, Patriotism
- Notable awards: Pride of Performance

Syed Pir Gohar Ali Shah (8 December 1931 – 4 January 2013), also known as Shaer-i-Aman (poet of peace), was a Pakistani poet, songwriter, critic and freedom activist who primarily wrote poems in Pashto language. He is also credited with contributing to the independence movement of Pakistan. He sometimes wrote articles and essays under pen names such as Shilmani and Silani.

Gohar was actively involved in literary activities. He served as the chairperson of a literary organization called Mardan Adabi Jirga, and a cultural council called Mardan Arts Council. Abdul Wali Khan University Mardan described him as a "prominent literary personality".

== Early life ==
Gohar was born on 8 December 1931 in Pirano Daga, Mardan, Khyber Pakhtunkhwa. He did his primary and secondary schooling during the British rule and master's degree after the nation was declared a sovereign state. He was associated with the Pakistan Muslim League (PML) before he started writing poetry. His life is covered by an Afghan writer Aftab Gul Banrr in his book titled Gouhariyat. Pakistani poet Ghumgeen Mayari is believed to have covered Gohar's life in her book titled "Shaair – Amn Pan Ao Shakhsiyat".

== Literary work ==
Gohar originally started his career with poetry, literature, comic stories, and fiction stories. He used to spend his time narrating his patriotic poetry at political events in the presence of Muhammad Ali Jinnah and Abdur Rab Nishtar. He was also involved in gazal writing. Gohar wrote about eight books of poetry, including Haq Shaoor, Azghun Pasarly, Walwaly, Polay Lasoona, and a book on Sufism titled Taswaf-e-Noorani. His book Shalghaty, written in Pashto, is considered one of his most important works. In addition to being associated with radio and television channels, he was actively involved in writing dramas aired on Radio Pakistan and subsequently the state-owned broadcaster Pakistan Television Corporation. His poems were later translated in ten languages, earning the title of "poet of peace". Military dictator and later president Muhammad Zia-ul-Haq awarded him the Presidential Pride of Performance in recognition of his contributions to the Pakistani literature. He was initially associated with the country's politics but later disassociated himself, believing them to be a "source of oppression of the poor".

Gohar died of a cardiac arrest on 4 January 2013 in the village of Pirano Daga, Mardan. He is buried in his family's ancestral graveyard.
