= Awadh Punch =

Urdu satirical weekly from Lucknow, India

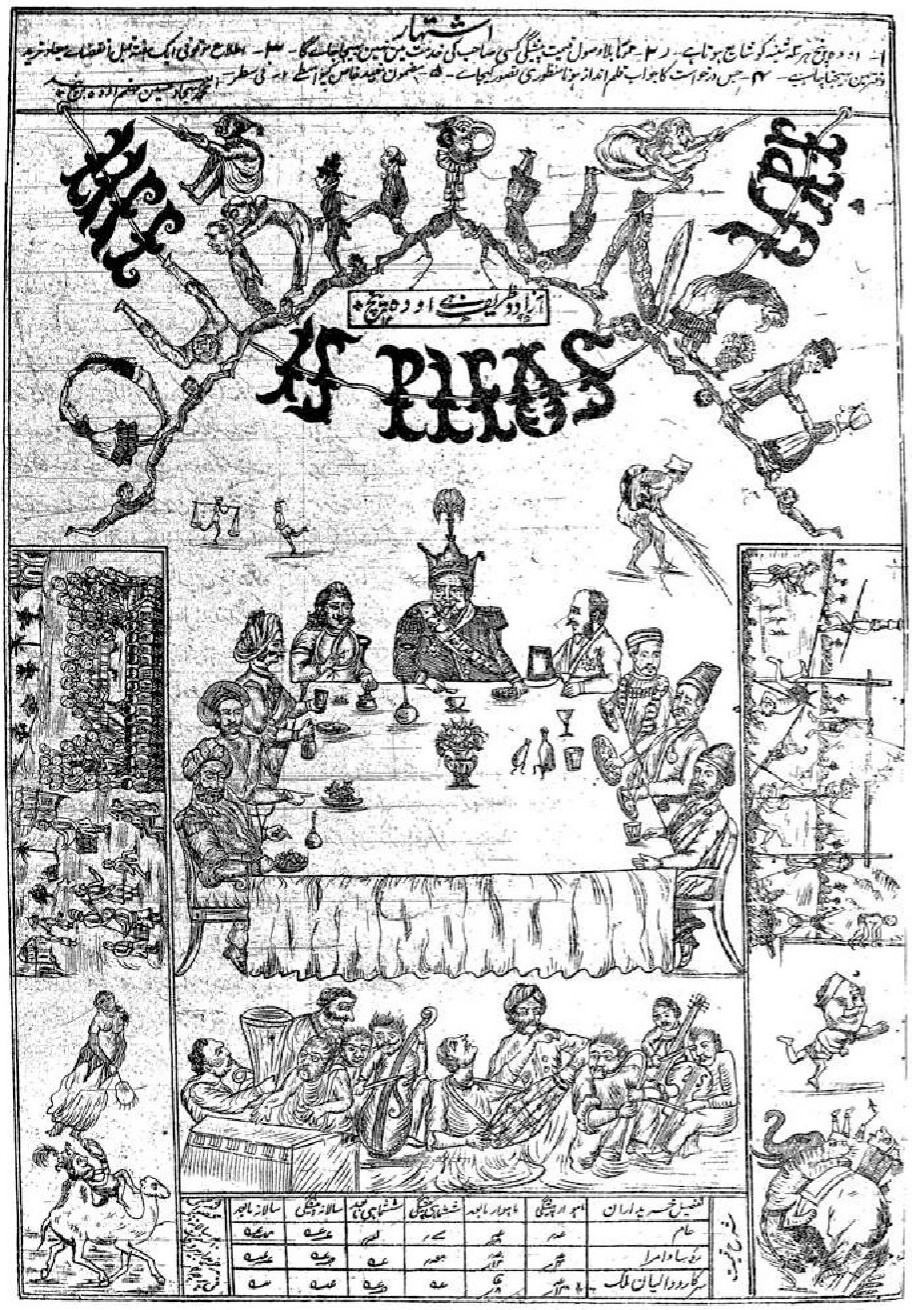
- Cover page, 1878
- Categories: Satire, comedy
- Frequency: Weekly
- Founder: Sajjad Husain
- Founded: 1877
- Final issue: 1937
- Country: India
- Based in: Lucknow
- Language: Urdu

The Awadh Punch (or Oudh Punch) was an Urdu satirical weekly published from Lucknow, British India from 1877 to 1937, It was launched on January 16, 1877 and was founded and edited by Munshi Sajjad Husain. It was modeled on Punch, a London-based weekly magazine from which it also derived its name. Some of its notable contributors were Ratan Nath Dhar Sarshar, Syed Mohammad Azad, Tribhavan Nath Hijr, Machchu Baig Sitam Zareef, Javala Prashad Barq, Ahmed Ali Shauq Qidvai and Akbar Allahabadi. The paper was one of the first to publish political satire, especially protesting British rule, in India. It had to be closed down in 1912 but was revived in 1916 and it continued till, at least, December 1937. The third and last attempt to revive it was made by Ahmad Jamal Pasha, with publication starting in 1959 and ending in 1962.
