= Raja Sivaprasad =

Raja Śivaprasāda or Shivaprasad C.S.I Sitara-e-Hind ("Star of India") (3 February 1823 – 23 May 1895) was an Indian scholar, linguist and historian. He was the title of Raja and old documents use the titular name or the prefix "babu", a term used for native Indian officers employed by the British Indian government. Born in Banaras he is known for the three-volume work on the history of India titled "Itihāsa timiranāśaka". He also translated several books from English to Hindi.

Sivaprasad was born in a Parmar family that converted to Jainism and the Oswal caste that originated in Ranthambore. When Ranthambor was besieged by Allauddin Khilji in the 13th century, the family moved several times, first to Ahmedabad, then to Champaner and finally to Khambat. One member of the family line, Amar Datt, gifted Shah Jahan a diamond and received the title of Ray. Sivaprasad's grandfather moved to Banaras and his father Gopichand died when he was eleven. His early education was from his grandmother, Bibi Ratan Kuar.

An anti-European upbringing led to him choosing, at the age of seventeen, to work for the Bharatpur Maharajah as a Vakil in the court of Colonel James Sutherland (commissioner), Governor-General's agent at Ajmer. He quickly resigned after finding the durbar "rotten". He then worked for Lord Hardinge's camp at Firozpur and was so impressed by the conditions that he swore never to serve under a native ruler again. He then worked for the British as a Mir Munshi in the Simla agency. He rose to become a Joint-Inspector for Schools in 1856. In May, 1870, he was conferred the Companionship of the most exalted Star of India or "Sitar-e-Hind" and the hereditary title of "Raja" in March 1874.

Sivaprasad submitted a memorandum in 1868, Court Characters in the Upper Provinces of India, in which he pointed out that Urdu characters required interpretation and that the phonemes could easily be altered by minor changes to the strokes causing major changes in meaning. He suggested that this could permit legal documents to be altered or forged and proposed therefore the use of Nagari scripts in courts. The period from 1845 to 1870 of Hindi printed literature was greatly influenced by Sivaprasad.

In 1875, with regard to the Hindi-Urdu language, Raja Shiva Prasad wrote Urdu Sarf O Nahr, in which he argued that "attempts of the Maulavis to Persianize and of the Pandits to Sanskritize the language were not only an error but against the laws of linguistic growth" as the "common man, he pointed out, used both Persian and Sanskrit words without any qualms".

Sivaprasad was proficient in Hindi, Urdu, Persian, Sanskrit, Bengali and English, and edited the news periodicals Banaras akhbaar and Simla akhbaar. He also contributed poems to the Awadh akhbaar and published thirty-five books. He was a promoter of the Hindi language, particularly the version known as khari boli and popularized the use of the Nagari script. He made full use of Arabic and Persian words in his writings, originally supporting the case for a more Sanskritized Hindi but then "later advocated a Persianzed style of Hindi".
