= Adamjee Peerbhoy =

Indian businessman (1846–1913)

Rafiuddin Sir Adamji Peerbhoy KIH JP

President of the All-India Muslim League
- In office 29 December 1907 – 18 March 1908
- Preceded by: Office established
- Succeeded by: Mian Shah Din

Sheriff of Mumbai
- In office 1898–1900
- Preceded by: Sir George Cotton
- Succeeded by: Sir Jamsetjee Jejeebhoy

Personal details
- Born: 13 August 1845 Dhoraji, British India
- Died: 11 August 1913 (aged 67)
- Party: All-India Muslim League
- Parent(s): Qadirbhoy Peerbhoy (father); Sakina Banu Peerbhoy (mother)
- Occupation: Businessman, philanthropist
- Known for: Establishing the Matheran Hill Railway
- Awards: Kaisar-i-Hind Medal (1900); Knight Bachelor (1907)

Sir Adamji Peerbhoy KIH JP (13 August 1845 – 11 August 1913) was an Indian business magnate, philanthropist and member of the Dawoodi Bohra community based at Bombay in British India.

== Biography ==
Adamji Peerbhhai was born in 1846 in Dhoraji, Princely State of Gondal, British India (now Gujarat), in a very poor dawoodi bohra family to Qadir bhai and Sakina ben Peerbhoy.

Adamji Peerbhai started his career at age of 13, as a street vendor in Bombay, selling match boxes but in one of the "rags to riches" stories being helped by two persons in his early life, one Seth Lukmanji and other an Englishman, Lt. Smith. Later by his untiring efforts and ability by the turn of the 19th century, became one of India's largest cotton manufacturers and wealthiest men. At one point he employed more than 15,000 workers in his cotton mills and supplied the canvas used for the tents and khaki uniforms of the British soldiers during the Second Boer War. He established several factories manufacturing thousands of tents and shoes for British soldiers and was also the owner of the Western Indian Tanneries, one of the largest tannery in Asia. It is thought that he first made his money from shipbuilding, and then diversified into trade and commercial interests.

Adamji Peerbhoy became appointed as the Sheriff of Mumbai in 1897 and was also appointed as Justice of Peace. Later, Peerbhoy became the first president of the Muslim League for a time, presiding over its first session in Karachi in December 1907.

In 1900 he was honoured by the title of `Qaisare-Hind'. In 1907 he was made a knight and given the title of `Sir’ by the British Government. Though an illiterate, Sir Adamji was honoured by Mohammedan Educational Conference to be its first president. He was also known as 'Rafiuddin' in the Bohra community, the 49th Dai, Syedna Mohammed Burhanuddin had conferred title of `Rafiuddin’ on him.

In 1884, Adamji Peerbhoy had built several properties, Masjid, sanatorium, kabristan, and Amanbai Charitable Hospital on Charni Road opposite the railway station. The property was built for the benefit of the poor and the needy. He wanted to provide a safe haven for the travelers, poor, or needy to rest, use the Masjid for prayers, or the hospital if they needed it.

In the year 1892, plague hit numerous parts of the Bombay State. Peerbhoy appointed doctors, arranged for vaccines & medicines from abroad and treated the public free of cost at the Amanbai Charitable hospital, for the sake of the nation. Among his other philanthropic works were distribution of grain during drought of Gujarat in 1877 and 1897, relief works at Burhanpur in 1866, relief works in Yemen, building of rest houses in Mecca, Medina, Karbala, starting orphanage in Kathiawar, starting at least 27 schools and funding establishment of Prince of Wales Science Institute at Aligarh Muslim University, to name a few.

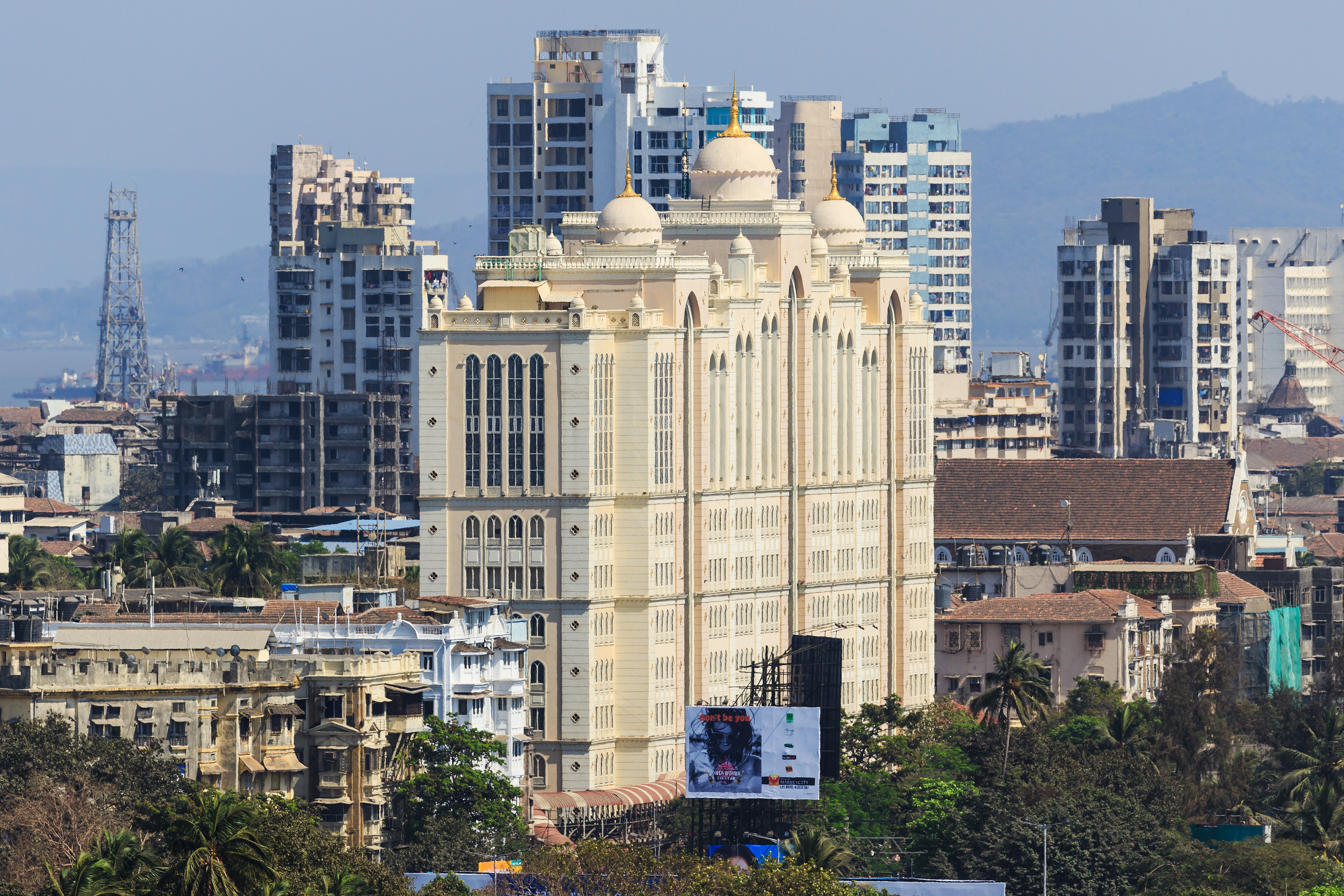
Saifee Hospital, opposite Charni Road Station founded as Amanbai Charitable Hospital by Sir Adamji Peerbhoy.

Peerbhoy financed his son, Abdul Hussein Peerbhoy's construction of the Matheran Hill Railway which linked Matheran and Neral.
