= Syed Nabiullah =

Syed Nabiullah (سيد نبي الله) was a prominent barrister from Lucknow, India, and one of the eminent leaders of the All India Muslim League.

== Early life ==
Syed Nabiullah was born in Kara/Manikpur village in the District of Prayagraj in 1860. He was one of the first few students who passed BA from Mohmmadan Anglo-Oriental College, established by Sir Syed Ahmed Khan. Later at the behest of Sir Syed Ahmed Khan, he and his brother Syed Habibullah went to England to study law. In England he became a Barrister-At-Law at Lincoln's Inn.

Nabiullah had a tall gaunt and imposing structure. He didn't have his left eye and had set a stone modelled eye. Nabiullah was the toast of Prayagraj and his hometown: Kara. He was a man of discipline and strictly adhered to his routine with punctuality.

== Career ==
In 1885, Nabiullah returned to India from England and established his law practice in Lucknow. In Lucknow he also became active in local and national politics. He was one of the founding members of All India Muslim League, as well as one of its prominent leaders. He was one of the 35 delegates, of the deputation who went to Shimla on 1 October 1906 to meet Lord Minto. He was a distinguished member of the All India Muhammadan Educational Conference at Dhaka, held in December 1906, in which formation of the All Indian Muslim League was resolved, and at the same time he became a member of this newly founded party.

Syed Nabiullah served as President of the All India Muslim league for two years. In 1910, at the Nagpore Session of the All India Muslim League, Nawab Ghulam Ahmed Khan Kalami of Madras proposed the election of Syed Nabiullah as President of the Sessions. The Nawab, in his speech proposing the election of Syed Nabiullah, stated that, "the East and West have blended in Mr. Syed Nabiullah to the best advantage". He concluded his speech by saying, "it is but right and proper that a gentleman of Mr. Nabiullah's attainments should be given the honour that is his due". Nawab Ghulam Ahmed Khan Kalami's proposal was unanimously accepted and Syed Nabiullah was declared the President of the Nagpore Session. He remained actively involved with the All India Muslim League till his death. He was held in very high esteem by other leaders of All India Muslim League because of his balanced views, talent and selflessness.

He served as the chairman of the Lucknow Municipal Board from 1916 to 1923.

== Death ==
He died in 1925, aged 65. A road in Lucknow is named Nabiullah Road after him.

== Personal life ==
His brother Syed Habibullah was also a well known lawyer of Lucknow. He was also related to Syed Zahur Ahmad of Lucknow to whom his niece, the daughter of Syed Habibullah, named Habib Fatima was married. Syed Nabiullah had a son Syed Waliullah and two daughters: Jannati Bibi and Ahmadi Bibi. Syed Waliullah was his only surviving son and Jannati Bibi was his only surviving daughter.
