= All-India Muhammadan Educational Conference =

Organisation promoting modern, liberal education for the Muslim community in India

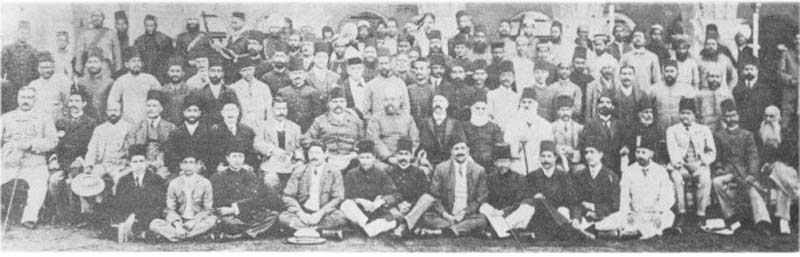
The All India Muhammadan Educational Conference, at Dhaka (1906), which led to the foundation of the Muslim League, on 30 December 1906.

The All-India Muhammadan Educational Conference was an organisation promoting modern, liberal education for the Muslim community in India. It was founded by Sir Syed Ahmed Khan, also the founder of the Aligarh Muslim University. All India Mumammadan Educational Conference was the origin of the All-India Muslim League. The Muslim League was born in the 20th session of All India Muhammadan Educational Conference, which was established by Syed Ahmed Khan in Aligarh in 1886. Muhammadan Educational Conference used to hold its annual meetings in various cities where, by the co-operation of local Muslims, steps were taken for the progress of education.

== History ==
The Muhammedan Educational Congress was founded in 1886. It was renamed the Muhammedan Educational Conference in 1890. The first conclave of the organisation was held in December 1886 at Aligarh and was presided by Maulvi Samiullah Khan. The second conclave concluded in December 1887 at Lucknow.

== Aims ==
The principal aims of the Conference were:

- To make an effort to spread among the Muslims western education to the higher standard.'
- To enquire into the state of religious education in English schools founded and endowed by the Muslims, and to find out means to conduct it in the best possible way.
- To give some strengthened support to the instruction voluntarily imparted by Muslim divines in religious and other oriental learning's and adopt some measures to maintain it as a living concern.
- To examine a state of education and instruction in the indigenous primary schools and take steps to remove their present state of decay in directing them onto the path of progress.

== The 1906 conference ==
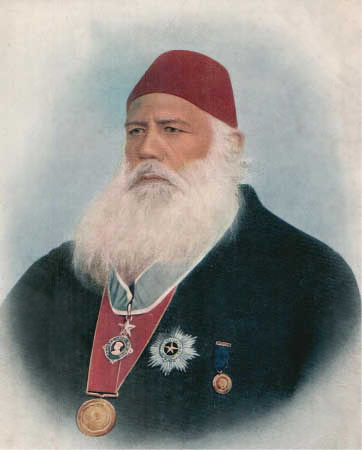
Sir Syed Ahmed Khan, the founder of All India Muhammadan Educational Conference

After the Congress sponsored agitation against the partition of Bengal (1905) an All India Muhammadan Educational Conference was held at Shahbag in Dhaka, capital of the then East Bengal and Assam Province in the year 1906. The conference was sponsored by Nawab Khwaja Salimullah the Nawab of Dhaka. The conference was inaugurated on 27 December 1906 and continued till 29 December 1906 as Conference on Education. The inaugural session was chaired by Nawab Justice Sharfuddin, the newly appointed justice of Calcutta High Court.

Those assembled met again on 30 December 1906, the day after the conclusion of the Educational Conference. The assembly was chaired by Nawab Viqar-ul-Mulk. At the meeting a motion to form an All India Muslim League (AIML) was passed. Initially a party styled as All India Muslim Confederacy was discussed. But, in the process the name All India Muslim League, proposed by Nawab Khawaja Sir Salimullah Bahadur and seconded by Hakim Ajmal Khan, was resolved in the meeting. All delegates were registered as members of the proposed party led by Janab Muhsin-ul-mulk and Janab Viqar-ul-mulk was Joint Conveners.

AIML was first Muslim political party in the history of India. From the even date Muslims of all Indian provinces were under the mainstream political umbrella of Muslim League until independence achieved in the year 1947 under the leadership of Muslim League. Awami Muslim League and Awami League was also formed as a late production of the party in the Pakistan Period. In Indo pak Bangla sub continent those parties have the part League possess heritage of Muslim League till date. Political awareness, eagerness and rising of Muslims was organised and institutionalised from the starting point of establishing All India Muslim League.

=== Venue ===
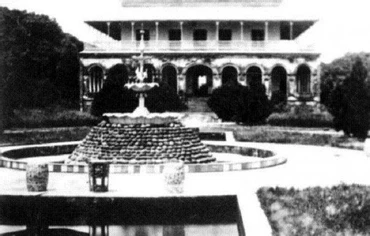
Ishrat Manzil

The place where All India Muhammadan Educational Conference were held was known to all as Ishrat Manzil, a mansion of the Dhaka Nawab Family that was later donated for the establishment of the Dhaka University. After 5 years of this conference in the year 1911 Partition of Bengal was annulled in the Delhi Durbar. In the year 1912 A delegation headed by Khawaja Nawab Sir Salimulla met Lord Hardinge Lt. Governor, to the same venue demanding establishment of a university at Dacca and it was agreed. Upon whom present Dhaka University was started its functioning on 1 July 1921 in the same venue. Now the Eshrat Manzil lapsed its heritage, fame and name of Dhaka's Nawab family and prevailed as a canteen named Madhur Canteen.

=== Delegates ===
A total of 1955 delegates attended the event. The conference was attended by most of the Muslim zamindars, educationists, pleaders, and other leaders of the community. The programme was attended among others by:

- Nawab Muhsinul Mulk Bahadur
- Mumtazul Mulk Khalifa Syed Muhammad Hussain from Patiala
- Hakim Ajmal Khan Delhi
- Khan Bahadur Raja Sir Mohammad Ali Mohammad Khan of Mahmudabad
- H.M. Malek of Nagpur
- Khan Bahadur Ahmad Muhiuddin of Madras
- Khan Bahadur Sheikh Gulam Sadik of Amritsar
- Raja Naushad Ali Khan, Talukdar of Maila Raiganj, Lucknow
- Syed Nabiullah, Bar at law, Lucknow
- Syed Zahur Ahmad, lawyer, Lucknow
- Honourable Khan-Bahadur Nawab Syed Navaab Ali Chowdhury, Zaminder of Mymensingh
- Syed Nawab Ali Chowdhury, Zaminder, Comilla
- Honourable Moulvi Khan Bahadur Syed Abdul Majid, District Session Judge, Assam
- Abdul Karim, School Inspector, Chittagong Division
- Khan Bahadur Moulvi Syed Muhammad, Inspector General of Registration, Bengal
- Mr. Sharp, Director of Public Instructions, East Bengal
- H.P. Mosurior, CIE, Commissioner, Dacca
- B.C. Allen, Magistrate and Collector, Dacca
- Mr H Stapleton
- Mr. Kelp, editor, Bengal Times
- Colonel J Hardinge, CIE
- Mr Campbell
- Rafiuddin Ahmed, Bar-at-law, of Bombay
- Nizamuddin Ahmed, B.A.B.L.Deputy Commissioner, Berar
