= Robert Durie Osborn =

British army officer

Lieutenant-Colonel Robert Durie Osborn (1835–1889) was a British army officer. Osborn was born at Agra, India, on 6 Aug. 1835. His father, Henry Roche Osborn, entered the British East India Company's service in May 1819, and served most of his time in the 54th Native Infantry, but later was lieutenant-colonel of the 13th Native Infantry; he died at Ferozepore in 1849.

== Military career ==
Robert was educated as a cadet at Dr. Greig's school at Walthamstow, and was appointed ensign of the 26th Bengal Native Infantry 16 August 1854, becoming lieutenant on 31 July 1857. He served throughout the Indian Mutiny campaign of 1857–1859, and was present in the actions of Boolundshuhur on 27 Sept., and of Allyghur on 5 October 1857. He commanded a detachment of the 4th Punjab infantry at the actions of Gungeree and Puttiallee, was present in various operations against the rebels in the Agra district, served with Colonel Troup's column in Oude in November 1858, and took part in the action at Biswah. From January to May 1859, he was with the Saugor field force under General Whitlock; then he commanded a field detachment in the Ooraie district, and later defeated a party of rebels at Tudhoorkee.

In 1859–60 he was with the Bundelcund field force under Brigadier Wheeler, and for his services received a medal. He was made lieutenant in the Bengal Staff Corps 30 July 1857 and captain 20 December 1865. On 25 August 1859, he became adjutant of the 2nd regiment of Sikh irregular cavalry, a regiment converted into the 12th regiment of Bengal cavalry in 1861, in which Osborn was third squad officer from 4 November 1865 to 17 May 1866. He was captain in his regiment 8 June 1868 to 1872. In the latter year he was appointed tutor to the Paikharah wards, became major on 20 December 1873, and retired with the honorary rank of lieutenant-colonel on 1 May 1879. He served through the Afghan campaign of that year, but retired after the signing of the Treaty of Gandamak.

== Writings ==
Osborn was a thinker on both religious and political topics. As a young man he enjoyed the friendship of F. D. Maurice and of Charles Kingsley, and occasionally wrote papers in the magazines on Maurice's religious position and influence. While in India, he was a conscientious student of Eastern religions, and spent fourteen years in studying materials for his two works, Islam under the Arabs, 1876, and Islam under the Khalifs of Baghdad, 1877; 2nd ed. 1880.

Osborn was an advocate of the rights of the native Indians, and his retirement from the army was largely due to his dissatisfaction with the policy of Lord Lytton, which, in his opinion, outraged native sentiment and needlessly provoked the Second Anglo-Afghan War. Upon his return from India, he settled at Hampstead, and mainly devoted himself to journalistic and literary work. He became London correspondent of the Calcutta Statesman, and took a leading part in the conduct of the London office of the Statesman, which was published for a few months in 1879 and 1880 with a view to resisting Benjamin Disraeli's policy in India. In The Scotsman, The Nation, and The Contemporary Review, he also wrote about India and on native claims to popular government.

== Personal life ==
Osborn was an indefatigable lawn tennis player. He died on Good Friday, 19 April 1889, while engaged playing a match with Ernest Renshaw, the champion of all England, at the Hyde Park, London tennis court in England. He married at Trinity Church, Bayswater, on 12 November 1864, to Edith, daughter of the Rev. Gregory Rhodes, by whom he had two daughters.

An oil portrait of Osborn was painted by Mr. J. R. Hodgson, R.A., in 1877, and was exhibited in the Royal Academy. It was presented to Osborn by the artist, and it passed on to his family.

== Works ==
- Friends of the Foreigner in the Nineteenth Century: a Critique, 1879
- Lawn Tennis: its Players and how to Play, 1881; 2nd edit. 1884.
