= Waqar-ul-Mulk =

British Indian politician (1841–1917)

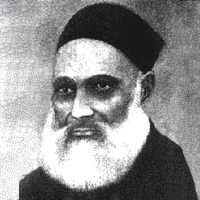
- Born: Mushtaq Hussain; 24 March 1841; Meerut, North-Western Provinces, British India
- Died: 27 January 1917 (aged 75)
- Resting place: Amroha, Uttar Pradesh
- Known for: one of the Founders of All India Muslim League in 1906; Aligarh Muslim University activist

Waqar-ul-Mulk (born Mushtaq Hussain; 24 March 1841 – 27 January 1917) was a British Indian Muslim politician and one of the founders of All India Muslim League. He was also the maternal uncle of mathematician Ziauddin Ahmad, a proponent of the Aligarh Movement.

== Early life and career ==
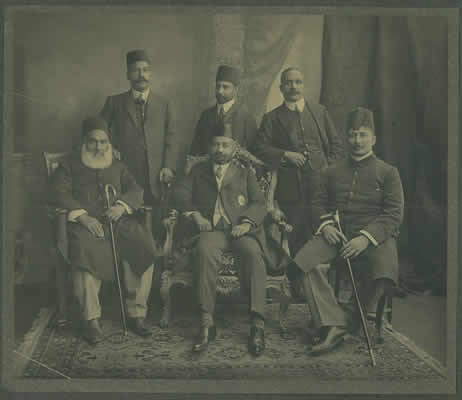
Nawab Waqar ul Mulk (seated, first from left) with other leaders of the Aligarh movement.

Nawab Waqar-ul-Mulk was born as Mushtaq Hussain into the Kamboh Nawab family of Meerut on 24 March 1841 to Sheikh Fazal Hussain. His great-grandfather, Diwan Abdul Momin Khan was a minister in the court of Mughal rulers.

His social welfare work in Moradabad, India's famine-affected areas was noticed by the Muslim leader Sir Syed Ahmad Khan in 1861. In 1866, at age 25, Mushtaq Hussain started his political career as a worker of the Aligarh Movement and, in this connection, became a member of its wing- Scientific Society. Later for the Scientific Society, he translated a book, 'French Revolution and Napoleon'. In 1870, Viqar-ul-Mulk was awarded a prize in an essay competition arranged by the 'Society for the Promotion of Education among Muslims'.

== Career in the Hyderabad state ==
He served as a Law Secretary in the Government of Hyderabad State, Deccan for some time and then joined Revenue Department with the orders of Nizam of Hyderabad. He served as Secretary, Personal Secretary and advisor to the Prime Minister Nawab Bashiral Daulla and eventually, he became Deputy Prime Minister of Hyderabad State.

On 9 December 1890, he was conferred the title of Nawab Viqar-ul-Mulk. In October 1892, Nawab Viqar-ul-Mulk joined M.A.O. college in Aligarh, Uttar Pradesh. He was a great admirer of Sir Syed Ahmed Khan. He was one of the most ardent followers of Sir Syed and a very active worker of his camp. When the 'College Fund Committee' was formed, he became one of its members and worked ceaselessly for popularizing the movement of Sir Syed. He raised a huge amount of money per the standards of that time, Rupees 750,000 for the establishment of the M. A. O. College. In 1907, he was appointed Honorary Secretary of M.A.O. College. He served the Hyderabad State under the British for 17 years. In 1908, as a result of his meritorious services, the British Government of India honored him with the title of Nawab. While the Nizam of Hyderabad honored him with the title of Waqar-ud-Dola Waqar-ul-Mulk Intisar-e-Jang.

== Founding of All India Muslim League ==
Nawab Viqar-ul-Mulk was one of the founders of the All-India Muslim League. In December 1906, the quartet Nawab Viqar-ul-Mulk, Sir Aga Khan III, and Nawab Salimullah Khan of Dhaka organised an All India Muhammadan Educational Conference in Dacca and on the same occasion, they also launched a new party called All-India Muslim League of which Nawab Viqar-ul-Mulk became General Secretary. Thus he was the founding father of Muslim League and later of the new country called Pakistan in 1947. He presided over the inaugural session of Muslim League. No doubt, he played a key role in shaping far-reaching political developments in British India.

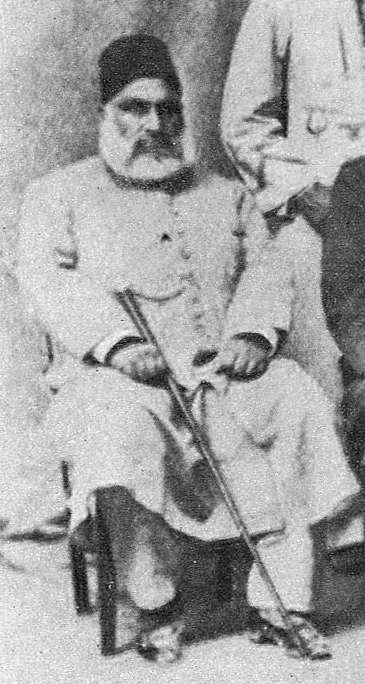
Nawab Waqar-ul-Mulk seated

== Death and legacy ==
Due to his bad health, Nawab Viqar-ul-Mulk gave up being the Secretary of Aligarh University in 1912. He was paralyzed by a stroke by 1915, and after a prolonged illness, he died on 27 January 1917 at age 75. He was buried in his family graveyard at Amroha, Uttar Pradesh.

It was widely considered among his contemporaries that Viqar-ul-Mulk (Mushtaq Hussain Zuberi) was a very stern, uncompromising person not often given to humor. It was also said by people that knew him that he commanded respect and fear rather than affection. Yet he was able to make a place for himself in the history of Aligarh movement as Sir Syed Ahmad Khan's close confidante and was ranked closely behind him in shaping far-reaching political and educational developments for the Muslims of British India.

== Commemorative postage stamp ==
Pakistan Postal Services issued a commemorative postage stamp in his honor in its 'Pioneers of Freedom' series in 1994.

== See also ==
- Aligarh Movement
- Pakistan Movement
