= Aligarh Muslim University Students' Union =

Student organisation in India

- Student's Union Hall, Aligarh Muslim University
- Institution: Aligarh Muslim University
- Former name: Siddons Union Club
- Formation: 1884
- Location: Students' Union Hall
- President: Noman Ashraf
- Vice-President: Nashra Naim
- Honorary Secretary: Mohammad Hamdan
- Cabinet Member: Muhammad Ahmad Khan; Hania Khan; Areeba Dilshad; Shazia Shamim; Muhammed Muhsin K; Muhammed Murshid K; Arsalan Khan; Anika Rumman Rahi; Shaheen Parween; Mohd Faiz
- Flag
- website: www.amu.ac.in/miscellaneous/amu-students-union

The Aligarh Muslim University Students' Union (AMUSU) is the official Students' Union of the Aligarh Muslim University, Aligarh, India. The Aligarh Muslim University Students' Union is the university-wide representative body for students and is autonomous in nature. It works according to their own constitution, written by Amin A. Bulbuliya. It is primarily responsible for building and preserving a healthy political culture and an atmosphere of open debates on the campus. The last election of Aligarh Muslim University Student's Union (AMUSU) was held in 2018-19. After a gap of eight long years, the union was restored in October, 2026, following widespread protest on the campus. University held its election on November 5, 2026, reviving the atmosphere of politics, representation and debate among students.

== History ==
Aligarh Muslim University's Student Union formalised its guiding documents in 1952-53.

It was established as a Students' Debating Society named after the first principal Henry George Impey Siddons of Muhammadan Anglo-Oriental College, the parent body of Aligarh Muslim University, on the model of Cambridge Union Society. The club was started in 1884 at Strachey Hall, located at the college premises. Debates of various issues related to Muslims of India and the world used to be conducted in the Siddons Union Club. The club had enthusiasm among the students of the M.A.O. College for its debates and English Style Club used to inculcate the debating skills and knowledge of English Language among the students. The founder, Sir Syed Ahmad Khan considered competence in English and "debating skills" necessary for maintaining Muslims' political influence, especially in Northern India. Khan's image for the college was based on his visit to Oxford and Cambridge and he wanted to establish an education system similar to the British model.

Until 1952, the vice chancellor of the university used to be the president of the union and the other posts were vice-president, librarian, secretary and member executive (cabinet). In 1952, the vice chancellor became the patron of the union and student became president. The three chair posts after 1952 were President, Librarian and Secretary. However, in the year 1958 the post of Librarian was abolished and it was replaced by vice president.

== List of presidents ==
The Union presidents of the last 20 years are as follows :

- Noman Ashraf (2026-27)
- M. Salman Imtiaz (2018–19)
- Mr. Maksoor Ahmad Usmani (2017–18)
- Faizul Hasan (2016–17)
- Abdullah Azzam (2014–15)
- Shahzad Alam Barni (2012–13)
- Syed Sharique Ahmad (2011–12)
- Abu Affan Farooqui (2010–11)
- Mr. Nafees Ahmad (2006–07)
- Abdul Hafeez (2005–06)
- Naseem Ashraf (2004–05)
- Nadim Asrar (1999–2000)

== List of vice presidents ==
- Nashra Naim (2026-27)
- A. T. M. Mustafa (1946–1947)
- Fazlul Bari (Banne Bhai) (1954-55)
- S.M. Haider Ali Khan (Asad) (1991–92)
- Mazin Hussain Zaidi (2006–07)
- Tauseef Alam (2012–13)
- Syed Masoodul Hasan (2014–15)
- Nadeem Ansari (2016–17)
- Sajjad Subhan Rather (2017–18)
- Hamza Sufyan (2018–19)

== List of Honorary Secretaries ==
- Mohammad Hamdan (2026-27)
- Maqsood Hussain Amoomi (1962-1963)
- Md Shams Shahnawaz (2004-05)
- Farrukh Khan (2005–2006)
- Aamir Qutub (2010–11)
- Nabeel Usmani (2016–17)
- Mohd Fahad (2017–18)
- Huzaifa Aamir Rashadi (2018–19)

== Lifetime members ==
- Mahatma Gandhi was the first life member of the union and was conferred upon him on 1920.
- Muhammad Iqbal, Muslim poet and philosopher (1929)
- Khan Abdul Ghaffar Khan, Pashtun freedom fighter (1934)
- Mohammad Ali Jinnah, Founder of Pakistan (1938)
- Jawaharlal Nehru, Ex-Prime Minister of India (1948)
- Saud bin Abdulaziz Al Saud, King of Saudi Arabia (1955)
- Mother Teresa, Social Worker (1983)
- Dalai Lama, Tibetan spiritual leader (1998)
- Anwar Sadat, Ex-President of Egypt (1955)
- Mohammed Zahir Shah, King of Afghanistan (1958)
- Gamal Abdel Nasser, President of Egypt (1960)
- Gamal Salem, Egyptian Revolutionary (1955)
- Soraya Esfandiary-Bakhtiary, Queen of Iran (1956)
- Dr. Rajendra Prasad, Ex-President of India (1951)
- V.V. Giri, Former President of India (1958)
- Morarji Desai, Former Prime Minister of India (1959)
- Abul Hasan Ali Hasani Nadwi, Noted Islamic Scholar (1959)
- Sir Alexander R. Todd, Nobel Laureate in Science (1960)
- Sarojini Naidu, Indian activist
- Refi Cevat Ulunay, Turkish journalist (1952)
- Ahmet Emin Yalman, Turkish journalist (1952)
- Arthur H. Compton, Chancellor of Washington University (1950)
- C. V. Raman, Scientist
- Ahmad Matin-Daftari, Ex-Prime Minister of Iran (1952)
- Sachin Pilot, Deputy Chief Minister of Rajasthan.
- Teesta Setalvad, Indian Civil Rights activist and journalist (2018)
- Asghar Hikmat, Iranian politician (1944)
- E. M. Forster and many more are also life members of the union

== See also ==
- AMU Journal
- Aligarh Muslim University
