= Tehzeeb-ul-Akhlaq =

Tehzeeb-ul-Ikhlaq
- Editor: Syed Ahmed Khan
- Categories: Islam
- Publisher: Syed Ahmed Khan
- First issue: 1871
- Country: British India
- Language: Urdu

Tehzeeb-ul-Ikhlaq (Urdu: تہذیب الاخلاق) is a magazine established by the Muslim reformer Sir Syed Ahmad Khan in 1871. The magazine published alternative Muslim perspectives, written in plain language. It gave voice to the publisher's religious, social, and reforming opinions, and is credited with establishing him as one of the fathers of Urdu fiction. Publication was interrupted in 1961 but restarted by Syed Hamid (Vice-chancellor of Aligarh Muslim University) in 1981. Since then it is being published regularly. There is now a separate office of Tehzeeb-ul-Ikhlaq.

== History ==
In April 1869 in London, Syed Ahmad Khan came across two social journals of social reformation, Spectator and Tatler. These two journals inspired Sir Syed to start a journal to reforms the Muslims of India. In a letter to his close friend Mohsin-ul-Mulk, he discussed the idea of Tehzeeb-ul-Ikhlaq, a journal for the social reformation of Muslims of India. He returned to Banaras, after an absence of about 19 months, in October, 1870. On 24 December, Sir Syed launched Tehzeeb-ul-Ikhlaq. It was named after a book by the philosopher Hakim Abu Ali Maska of Turkistan. It faced stiff resistance from the muslims of India but at the same time if found its well wishers too. Nawab Mohsinul Mulk, Maulvi Muhammad Chiragh Ali Khan, Maulvi Mushtaq Hussain, Maulana Altaf Hussain Hali, Shamsul Ulema Maulvi Zakaullah, Shamsul Ulema Allama Shibli Nomani, Maulvi Mehdi Hasan, Syed Mahmood, Syed Karamat Hussain, Samiullah Khan, Muhammad Nusrat Ali and Sir Syed wrote many articles on social and religious reforms.

From the inception in 1870 till 1881, Tehzeeb-ul-Ikhlaq was discontinued twice and finally in 1881 it was merged with Aligarh Institute Gazette.

== Revival ==
In 1981, a staunch supporter of Aligarh Movement and an AMU alumnus, Syed Hamid, the then Vice-Chancellor of Aligarh Muslim University re-started Tahzeebul Akhlaq as a Bi-monthly private journal. A committee was formed with Syed Hamid as its chief editor and Qazi Moizuddin as its editor.

In 1983, Prof. Noorul Hasan Naqvi of Department of Urdu took over the charge of editorship of the journal. He engaged young research scholar Dr. Qamrul Huda Faridi as Honorary Assistant Editor for the journal.

In April 1985, under the Vice Chancellorship of Syed Hashim Ali Aligarh Muslim University acquired Tahzeebul Akhlaq and allocated required administrative staff and building and made Aligarh Muslim University Vice-Chancellor as its Patron.

== See also ==
- Aligarh Institute Gazette
