= Thomas Walker Arnold =

British orientalist and historian (1864–1930)

Sir Thomas Walker Arnold CIE
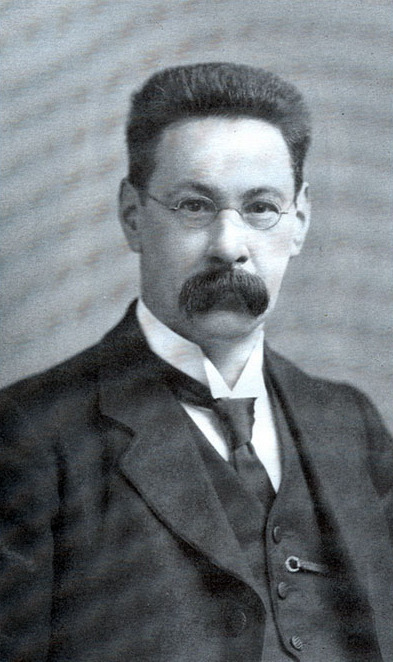
- Sir Thomas Arnold
- Born: 19 April 1864; Devonport, Devon, England
- Died: 9 June 1930 (aged 66); London, England

Sir Thomas Walker Arnold CIE FBA (19 April 1864 – 9 June 1930) was a British orientalist and historian of Islamic art. He taught at Muhammadan Anglo-Oriental College (MAO College), later Aligarh Muslim University, and Government College University, Lahore.

Arnold was a friend of Sir Syed Ahmed Khan, who influenced him to write the famous book The Preaching of Islam, and of Shibli Nomani, with whom he taught at Aligarh. He taught Syed Sulaiman Nadvi and the poet-philosopher Muhammad Iqbal. He was the first English editor for the first edition of The Encyclopaedia of Islam.

== Life ==
Thomas Walker Arnold was born in Devonport, Plymouth on 19 April 1864, and educated at the City of London School and Magdalene College, Cambridge. From 1888, he worked as a teacher at the MAO College, Aligarh.

In 1898, he accepted a post as Professor of Philosophy at the Government College, Lahore and later became Dean of the Oriental Faculty at Punjab University.

From 1904 to 1909, he was on the staff of the India Office as Assistant Librarian. In 1909, he was appointed Educational Adviser to Indian students in Britain. From 1917 to 1920, he acted as Adviser to the Secretary of State for India. He was Professor of Arabic and Islamic Studies at the School of Oriental Studies, University of London, from 1921 to 1930.

Arnold died on 9 June 1930 at Edmonton, Middlesex.

Letter to Snouck Hurgronje (1902)

== Personal life ==
In 1892, Arnold married Celia Mary, a daughter of G. Hickson, and they had one daughter. His wife was a niece of Theodore Beck.

== Honours ==
- Companion of the Order of the Indian Empire, 1912
- Knight bachelor, 1921
- Fellow of the British Academy, 1926
- Honorary Fellow, Magdalene College, Cambridge
- Honorary degree of doctor of philosophy, German University, Prague

== Works ==
- The preaching of Islam: a history of the propagation of the Muslim faith. Westminster: A. Constable and co. 1896.
- (trans. and ed.) The little flowers of Saint Francis by Francis of Assisi. London: J.M. Dent, 1898.
- The Court Painters of the Grand Moghuls. Oxford: Oxford University Press, 1921.
- The Caliphate. Oxford: Clarendon Press, 1924. Reissued with an additional chapter by Sylvia G. Haim: Routledge and Kegan Paul, London 1965.
- Painting in Islam, A Study of the Place of Pictorial Art in Muslim Culture. Oxford: Clarendon Press, 1928. Reprint ed. 1965.
- Bihzad and his Paintings in the Zafar-namah ms. London: B. Quaritch, 1930.
- (with Alfred Guillaume) The Legacy of Islam. Oxford: Oxford University Press, 1931.
- The Old and New Testaments in Muslim Religious Art. London: Pub. for the British Academy by H. Milford, Oxford University Press. Schweich Lectures for 1928.
