= Jai Kishan Das =

Raja Jai Kishan Das Chaube, CSI, Rai Bahadur (24 November 1832 – 30 April 1905) was an Indian administrator and close associate of Sir Syed Ahmad Khan, founder of Aligarh Muslim University.

He was born on 24 November 1832 at Moradabad to Brindaban Das Choube in a respectable Hindu family.

After completing his education, he joined Indian Civil Service and later retired as Deputy Collector of Aligarh district.

He was awarded with Mutiny Medal in 1858. In 1860, received the title of Raja and Rai Bahadur so came to be known as Raja Jai Kishan Das Bahadur. He was created C.S.I. on 31 May 1870.

He grew close friendship with Sir Syed Ahmad Khan, the founder of Aligarh Muslim University. He was associated with him since 1863, when Sir Syed founded the Scientific Society, which in course of time was relocated to Aligarh. Later when Syed Khan shifted to Benaras in course of his job, Raja Jai Kishan was elected as Secretary of Scientific Society of Aligarh in 1867, in which position he served til 1874, when Jai Kishan shifted to Allahabad upon retirement. In the farewell function, Sir Syed praised his efforts and sincerity for The Scientific Society and Raja Jai Kishan Das was nominated as Co-President of The Society for life.

He also served as President and Secretary of British Indian Association. He was always an active participant in Muslim Education Conference, founded by Sir Syed, in 1886. Raja Jai Kishan played a key role for promotion of education and communal harmony among Hindus and Muslims. and helping Sir Syed in the founding of Aligarh Muslim University. He also donated funds for the establishment of University.

He was the officiating editor of the Aligarh Institute Gazette.

The Vice Roy appointed him the fellow of the Calcutta University in 1876.

He died on 30 April 1905 and Muhammadan Anglo-Oriental College remained closed for the day to mourn his death.

== Memorials ==
MAO College and later Aligarh Muslim University is awarding two medals with Raja Jai kishan Das’s name. Later one of the hostel in Sir Sulaiman Hall of Aligarh Muslim University was named after Raja Jai Kishan Das.
