= Syed Mahmood =

Indian barrister (1850-1903)

Honorable Puisne Judge Syed Mahmood
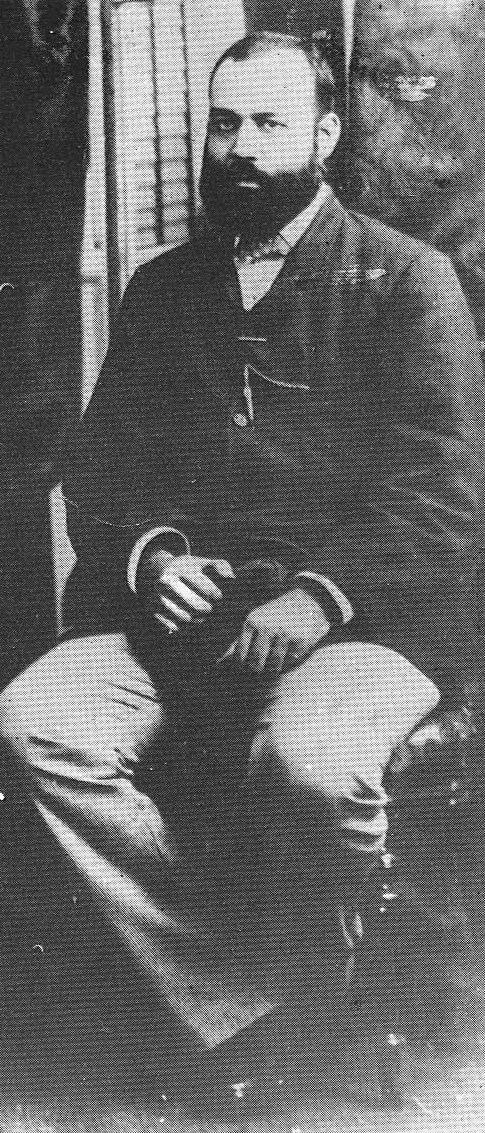

Puisne Judge of Allahabad High Court
- In office 1887–1893

Personal details
- Born: 24 May 1850 Delhi, Mughal Empire
- Died: 8 May 1903 (aged 52) Sitapur, United Provinces of Agra and Oudh, British India
- Children: Ross Masood
- Parent: Sir Syed Ahmed Khan

Justice Syed Mahmood (also spelled Sayyid Mahmud; 24 May 1850 – 8 May 1903) was a puisne judge of the High Court, in the North-Western Provinces of British India from 1887 to 1893, after having served in the High Court in a temporary capacity as officiating judge on four previous occasions since 1882.

He was the first Indian jurist to be appointed to High Court at Allahabad, and the first Muslim to serve as a High Court judge in the British Raj. Syed Mahmood also had a major role in assisting his father, Sir Syed Ahmed Khan in establishing the Muhammadan Anglo-Oriental College, which later developed into Aligarh Muslim University.

As a jurist, his judgments dominate the Indian Law Reports: Allahabad Series for the years he was on the bench. He also participated actively in the formation of laws through writing lengthy notes on proposed laws to the legislative councils of both the Governor-General of India and the Lieutenant Governor of the North-Western Provinces. Syed Mahmood was appointed to the N.-W.P. and Oudh Legislative Council from 1896 to 1898.

== Education ==
Syed Mahmood was born in Delhi on 24 May 1850, the second son of Syed Ahmad Khan. He subsequently studied in Moradabad, and Aligarh, all cities to which his father had been posted as a member of the Indian Civil Service. He also studied at the Government College in Delhi and at Queen's College in Benares before passing his Matriculation Examination at the University of Calcutta in 1868. He then received a scholarship from the British government in India to study in England.

In 1869, Mahmood was admitted to Lincoln's Inn and in April 1872 he was called to the Bar. Around the same time, from 1870, he studied Latin, Greek and oriental languages for two years at Christ's College, Cambridge but without graduating.

== Legal career ==
After returning to India, Mahmood enrolled as a barrister in the High Court in Allahabad in 1872, the first Indian to achieve that distinction in that court. He worked as a barrister in Allahabad until 1878. The following year he was appointed as a District and Sessions Judge in Oudh by the Viceroy of India, Lord Lytton. This was his substantive appointment in the Indian Civil Service until 1887 when he was appointed Puisne Judge of the High Court at Allahabad, though this service was interrupted several times with temporary appointments as officiating judge at the High Court. He also was seconded briefly to the Nizam in Hyderabad State, where he assisted with the judicial administration in 1881.

In 1882, Syed Mahmood received his first officiating appointment as a judge to the High Court of the North-Western Provinces in Allahabad, with active lobbying on his behalf by the Viceroy who had replaced Lytton, Lord Ripon. He served as an officiating judge three more times before he received his full appointment as Puisne Judge in 1887. His contemporaries generally considered him to have an exceptional ability, assisted by a knowledge of the Arabic language that he had gained while studying in Cambridge and which was invaluable for assessing Muslim law. His judgements, says Kozlowski, were "written with a clarify and vivacity rare in a rather dense literary genre." Throughout his time on the bench, Mahmood was known for his lengthy, detailed written judgments, many of which were published in the Law Reports for those years. Whitley Stokes, Law Member of the Viceroy's Legislative Council in India during the years 1877 to 1882, later praised Mahmood's judgments in his Anglo-Indian Codes. Likewise, in an obituary he wrote, Tej Bahadur Sapru, a younger contemporary of Mahmood's, commented that his long and detailed judgments were necessary because of the spate of new legislation being enacted that needed to be clarified in a court of law. Nevertheless, his opinions were very often rejected by the full bench, which mostly consisted of British judges; Kozlowski notes that "broad learning and clever argument based on Muslim sources were not ultimately decisive in the system of justice the British administered in India." His prolixity and frequent dissenting opinions were a couple of the factors that led to conflicts with his fellow judges, and eventually to an early retirement in 1893. Kozlowski says that the retirement came about because of pressure being put on him due to his severe drunkenness. Mahmood denied that he was an alcoholic and blamed the jealousy of John Edge, the Chief Justice, but even his friends acknowledged it was a problem.

After his retirement from the judiciary, he returned to his legal practice as a barrister, working in Lucknow as well as serving on the North-Western Provinces and Oudh Legislative Council from 1896 to 1898.

== Educational work ==
Shortly after returning to India after his studies in England in 1872, Syed Mahmood wrote a proposal for the establishment of a self-supporting Muslim college in India based on the model he had experienced at Cambridge University. He then assisted his father, Sir Syed, in founding the Muhammadan Anglo-Oriental College at Aligarh, and continued to play a vital role in its administration even while working as a lawyer and judge in Allahabad. In 1883, he returned to England to recruit Theodore Beck to serve as the school's principal. He took an active part in teaching English classes and establishing a law program at the school, donating a major portion of his own collection of legal texts to form a legal library. In 1889, his father nominated Mahmood as Joint Secretary of the board of trustees for the school. After his father's death in 1898, he took up his responsibilities as Life Honorary Joint Secretary. The following year he was replaced in this position by Nawab Mohsin-ul-Mulk, and was elevated to the post of Honorary President instead.

Syed Mahmood was active in educational ventures outside of the MAOC as well. During the Ripon administration, he was appointed as one of the commissioners of the 1882 Education Commission, investigating the state of education in India. He was also an active participant in the All India Muhammadan Educational Conference, delivering a series of lectures on the history of English education in India during the annual meetings of 1893 and 1894.

== Family ==
In 1888, Syed Mahmood married Musharraf Jahan, the daughter of Nawab Khwajah Sharfuddin Ahmad, his father's maternal cousin. They had one son Ross Masood. Mahmood purchased a home in Allahabad which was subsequently sold to Motilal Nehru who was also serving as a barrister in the Allahabad court at that time, and which was eventually renamed Swaraj Bhavan. Earlier in 1876, Syed Mahmood had established another residence in the city of Aligarh; this currently houses the Sir Syed Academy. In 1900, after becoming estranged from both his family and the college at Aligarh, Mahmood moved to Sitapur where he lived with his cousin, Syed Muhammad Ahmad, until his death in 1903.

== Writings ==
Syed Mahmood's first contribution to the legal literature of British India was an Urdu translation of the 1872 Law of Evidence and subsequent amendments, published in 1876. He revised his lectures to the Muhammadan Educational Conference and published them in English as A History of English Education in India in 1895. He also contributed articles to the Aligarh Institute Gazette and the Calcutta Review. But his major written contribution consisted of the approximately 300 legal judgments recorded in the Indian Law Reports: Allahabad Series between the years 1882 and 1892, a considerable number of which were over twenty pages in length. Contemporaries note that he was preparing a multi-volume work on Muslim law after his retirement from the bench, but this remained uncompleted at the time of his death.

== Bibliography ==
- Banerji, Satish Chandra. "Syed Mahmood: Recollections and Impressions," The Hindustan Review and Kayastha Samachar n.s. 7, no. 3 (1903): 439–443.
- Guenther, Alan M. "Syed Mahmood and the Transformation of Muslim Law in British India." Ph.D. Dissertation, McGill University, 2004.
- Hidayatullah, M. "Justice Syed Mahmood," in A Judge's Miscellany. Bombay: N. M. Tripathi, 1972.
- Husain, Iqbal, ed. Justice Syed Mahmood Papers. Aligarh: Sir Syed Academy, Aligarh Muslim University, 2005.
- Husain, Yusuf, ed. Selected Documents from the Aligarh Archives Bombay: Asia Publishing House for the Department of History, Aligarh Muslim University, 1967.
- Kozlowski, Gregory C. Muslim Endowments and Society in British India. (Reprint ed.). Cambridge: Cambridge University Press, 2008. ISBN 9780521088671
- Lelyveld, David. Aligarh's First Generation: Muslim Solidarity in British India. Princeton: Princeton University Press, 1978.
- Lelyveld, David. "The Mystery Mansion: Swaraj Bhavan and the Myths of Patriotic Nationalism," The Little Magazine4, no. 4, "Ghosts" 2004.
- Mahmood, Syed. A History of English Education in India: Its Rise, Development, Progress, Present Condition and Prospects. Aligarh: M.A.-O.College, 1895.
- "Mahmood Number" Aligarh Law Journal 5 (1973).
- Sapru, Tej Bahadur. "Syed Mahmood, as a Judge," The Hindustan Review and Kayastha Samachar n.s. 7, no. 3 (1903): 443–452.
- Stokes, Whitley. The Anglo-Indian Codes, vol. 1, Substantive Law. Oxford: Clarendon Press, 1887.
- Uttar Pradesh (India). High Court of Judicature. Centenary: High Court of Judicature at Allahabad, 1866–1966, 2 vols. Allahabad: Allahabad High Court Centenary Commemoration Volume Committee, 1966.
