= Shafey Kidwai =

Bilingual critic, scholar and communication expert

Shafey Kidwai (born 8 April 1960) is an Indian academic, bilingual critic, translator, columnist, and author, who has been conferred with highest literary award in Urdu literature in India, the Sahitya Akademi Award for Urdu. He is a professor in the Department of Mass Communication at Aligarh Muslim University and has written twelve books in English and Urdu.

Prof. Shafey Kidwai, also served as the dean of the Faculty of Social Sciences at Aligarh Muslim University (from June 26, 2024). He presently is the director of the Sir Syed Academy.

He studied at Lucknow and Varanasi and lives in Aligarh with his wife Shaista Faridi, son Shaghil Kidwai and his elder son Sharif Kidwai is an engineer at Apple Inc and settled in the United States . He is a grandson of famous author and scholar Maulana Abdul Majid Daryabadi. He regularly participates in seminars and literary festivals. He is a member of the General Council of Sahitya Academy and National Council for the promotion of Urdu. He was the convener of Bhasha Samiti(Urdu)Saraswati Samman and Bhartiya Jnanpith.

His 2017 work Sawaneh-e-Sir Syed: Ek Bazdeed - a biography of Sir Syed won the 2019 Sahitya Akademi Award for Urdu. A previous work Urdu Literature and Journalism: Critical Perspective was published by Cambridge University Press India.

In 2018, Kidwai was awarded the Iqbal Samman by the Government of Madhya Pradesh for his service to promotion of Urdu literature. UP Urdu Academy has also conferred its highest literary honour Khusro Award to him in 2018. He is a bilingual critic and communication expert and his fortnightly column on literature, Culture and media Going Native appears in the Friday Review, The Hindu. He is the chief editor of Aligarh Journal of Communication and he is on the editorial board of several peer-reviewed communicational journals including research journal jointly published by University of Purdue and Kolkata.

== Books ==
- Sir Syed Ahmad Khan: Reason, Religion and Nation ( Routledge,2020)
- Aligarh Institute Gazette An Analytical Study(Brown Books, 2021),
- Sawaneh SirSyed:Ek Bazdeed, Sahita Academy award, 2019, (Brown Books 2017)
- RK Naryan(translation, SahiytaAcademy, 2017)
- MabaadJadded fiction:Pas Sakhtiyati Tanazur(Brown Books2017)
- Urdu Literature and Journalism: Critical Perspective(Cambridge University Press India, 2014)
- National Awakening and Maulana Azad with special reference to Alhilal(Ranch University,2012)
- Meeraji (Monograph, Makers of India Series, Sahita Academy, 1998)
- Khabar Nigari (1988)
- Michal Madhusudan Dutt (translation. Sahiyta Academy,1992)
- The Terminology of Mass Communication in Urdu(national council for promotion of Urdu, New Delhi, 2003)

== Awards and Honors ==
- Sahitya Akademi Award (2019): Shafey Kidwai received the prestigious Sahitya Akademi Award for Urdu in 2019 for his biographical work Sawaneh-e-Sir Syed: Ek Bazdeed (2017), a comprehensive biography of Sir Syed Ahmad Khan.
- Iqbal Samman (2018): In recognition of his significant contributions to the promotion of Urdu literature, Shafey Kidwai was awarded the Iqbal Samman by the Government of Madhya Pradesh in 2018.
- Khusro Award (2018): Shafey Kidwai was honored with the highest literary accolade of the UP Urdu Academy, the Khusro Award, in 2018 for his exceptional work in Urdu literature.

== See also ==
- Abdul Majid Daryabadi, grandfather of Shafey Kidwai
