= Tehzeeb =

Tehzeeb may refer to:

- Tehzeeb (1971 film), a Pakistani film
- Tehzeeb (2003 film), an Indian drama film by Khalid Mohammed, starring Shabana Azmi and Urmila Matondkar
- Ganga-Jamuni tehzeeb, phrase in Indian culture
- Tehzeeb-ul-Akhlaq (1871-1897), a journal published by the Indian Muslim reformer Sir Syed Ahmed Khan
