= Ross Masood =

Vice-Chancellor of Aligarh Muslim University (1889-1937)

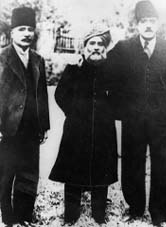
- Ross Masood, (right) with Sulaiman Nadwi (center) and Muhammad Iqbal (left) in Afghanistan
- Born: 15 February 1889; Delhi, British India
- Died: 30 July 1937 (aged 48); Bhopal, Bhopal State, British India
- Father: Syed Mahmood
- Relatives: Syed Ahmed Khan (grandfather)

Sir Ross Masood (15 February 1889 – 30 July 1937) was the Vice-Chancellor of Aligarh Muslim University starting in 1929.

== Early life and career ==
Ross Masood was the son of Syed Mahmood. His grandfather was Sir Syed Ahmed Khan. He had three children: one daughter, Nadira Begum, and two sons, Anwar Masood and Akbar Masood (1917–1971). Ross Masood was educated at Aligarh Muslim University and the University of Oxford.

On his return from England, Masood was elected a trustee of Muhammadan Anglo-Oriental College and started his own legal practice in Patna. He then entered the Indian Education Service as headmaster of the Patna High School, a professor of history at Ravenshaw College, Cuttack (Orissa), and one of the founders of Osmania University.

From 1916 to 1928, he was Director of Public Instruction in Hyderabad Deccan. In 1922, he travelled to Japan to assess its educational system as a possible model for Hyderabad. In his publication, Japan and its Educational System (1923), Masood recommended that Hyderabad follow a Japanese model of modernization and educational reform by focusing on the imperial tradition, patriotic nationalism, and freedom from foreign control.

He became the Vice-Chancellor of Aligarh Muslim University in 1929. He was knighted by the British Government in the 1933 Birthday Honours list. Here, he introduced new courses, upgraded the syllabi and established laboratories for various science subjects.

Masood was the president of Anjuman Taraqqi-i-Urdu.

Masood was friends with the English novelist E. M. Forster, who dedicated his 1924 novel A Passage to India to Masood. Forster would later write of Masood: "He woke me up out of my suburban and academic life, showed me new horizons and a new civilisation and helped me towards the understanding of a continent".

== Legacy ==
Anjuman Taraqqi-i-Urdu published a biography of Masood in 2011.

A residential hall constructed in the year 1969 in Aligarh Muslim University is named after him.

Academic offices
Preceded by Shah Muhammad Sulaiman	Vice-Chancellor of AMU; 1929	Succeeded by Nawab Mohammad Ismail Khan
