= Maskoor Usmani =

Indian politician

Dr.Maskoor Ahmad Usmani
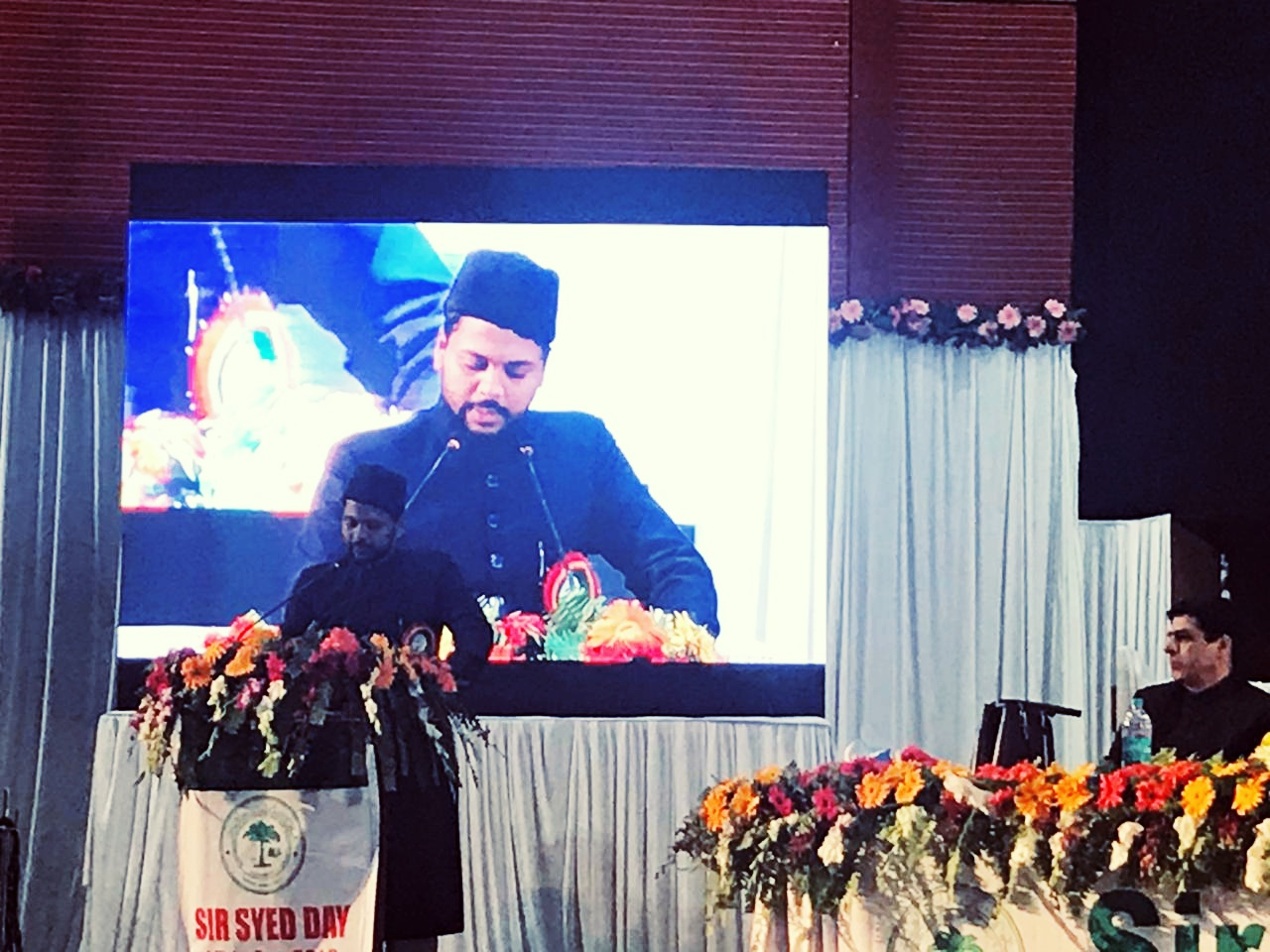
- Born: Maskoor Ahmad Usmani; Darbhanga, Bihar
- Education: Bachelor of Dental Surgery (BDS)
- Alma mater: Aligarh Muslim University
- Occupations: Student Activist, Politician (INC Candidate, Jale Vidhan Sabha)
- Years active: 2016–present
- Known for: Participation in Citizenship Amendment Act protests
- Political party: Indian National Congress

Maskoor Ahmad Usmani is an Indian politician based in Darbhanga, Bihar. Usmani was the president of the Aligarh Muslim University Students' Union and is a national leader of the Indian National Congress. He is known for participation in Citizenship Amendment Act protests.

== Early life and education ==
Usmani was born in Garoul, a village Panchayat located in Darbhanga, in 1995. He completed his primary education from Garoul before entering Iqra Academy, Darbhanga. Usmani attended Kendriya Vidyalaya - 2, Darbhanga. Usmani participated in state level debates, science exhibitions, and co-curricular activities while at school. He was also the school captain and scout and guide commander.

He then pursued a Bachelor in Dental Surgery from Aligarh Muslim University.

== Political career ==
=== Aligarh Muslim University Student's Union ===
In December 2017, Usmani defeated Ajay Singh by 6,719 votes and was elected as a president of the Aligarh Muslim University Students' Union. Usmani has been campaigned against Hindutva politics, which promotes a manifestation of Hindu Nationalism. In 2018, Usmani met with former vice-president of India Hamid Ansari at his residence to invite him to the Aligarh Muslim University Students' Union.

=== Anti CAA Movement ===
In 2019, Usmani came into the limelight during the anti-CAA protest. He started campaigning against CAA-NRC, the 2019 amendment in the Indian Citizenship Act. At that time he criticised the government and took part in several anti-CAA protests across India. During this period, he was invited as a TV panelist, where he voiced his dissent against the newly passed CAA.

=== Bihar Assembly Elections- 2020 ===
Usmani was an INC candidate from the Jale (Vidhan Sabha constituency), which is part of No. 6 Madhubani (Lok Sabha constituency) in the 2020 Bihar Legislative Assembly election. INC is a coalition partner within the Mahagathbandhan (Bihar). He stood 2nd and managed to secure 65580 electoral votes.

== Controversy ==
In 2018, local BJP MP Satish Gautam demanded the removal of Jinnah's portrait from the student union's office. During that time, Usmani was the president of the Aligarh Muslim University Students' Union. BJP accused Maskoor Ahmad Usmani of opposing the call to remove Jinnah's portrait from the student union's office. On his defense, Usmani released a statement, "We’d again like to make it very clear that the students of Aligarh Muslim University are in no way defending Mohammad Ali Jinnah or his portrait". Usmani wrote a letter to PM Narendra Modi requesting removal of all portraits of Jinnah across India, particularly pointing to Jinnah’s portrait within the Bombay High Court and the Parliament of India.

In 2019, Usmani was booked under sedition charges for raising anti-national slogans. According to Outlook India, 14 students had a noisy disturbance with the Republic TV crew in an ongoing college meeting. AMU authority and Republic TV both lodged complaints at the Civil Lines Police Station. Later, sedition charges were dropped, and it was discovered that Usmani was in Delhi when the incident happened.

In 2020, Twitter suspended his official account for criticizing Unlawful Activities (Prevention) Act on the arrest of Safoora Zargar and Meeran Haider.
