= Siddons Union Club =

The Siddons Union Club
- 1884
- Type: Student Debating Union
- Headquarters: Aligarh
- Location: The Siddons Union Debating Hall

Siddons Union Club, commonly referred to as 'The Siddons Union', was established in the year 1884 at Muhammadan Anglo-Oriental College, the present day Aligarh Muslim University. The club was named after Henry George Impey Siddons, the first principal of the college. the Siddons Debating Union Hall, the debating chamber, was constructed which consist of a debating hall, a library and a reading room. The Cambridge Union Society gave birth to debating societies of the prominent universities of the world namely Oxford Union, Yale Political Union. Siddons Union Club hosted a number of National and International Politicians, Writers, Nobel Laureates, Players, and Journalists, including the Dalai Lama, Mahatma Gandhi, Maulana Abul Kalam Azad, Jawahar Lal Nehru.

== History ==
In 1884, the Siddons Union Club modeled after debating club at Cambridge began its activities at Strachey Hall. Debates were held twice a month in English and once a month in Hindustani. At the foundation an interchange of greetings between Cambridge Union Society took place. The following were the texts:

The President of the Siddons Union Club of the Mohammedan Anglo-Oriental College presents his compliments to the President of the Cambridge University Union Society, and begs to inform him that the Cambridge University Union Society has given birth to a similar, though at present small, Society in the far East. He invites the sympathy of members of the ancient and flourishing society at Cambridge for the youthful club founded by men who, though different in race, are citizens of the same great empire. The creed of Allygurh is, that the relationship of Englishman and Indian should be that of brothers. He hopes that if any member of the C.U.U.S. should visit Allygurh he will experience a practical exemplification of that aim."

To this, the following reply was received :- "At the first private business meeting of this term, the following resolution was proposed by the President of the Society' (Mr W. Howard Stables, Trinity College), and seconded by Mr J. Austen Chamberlain, Trinity College, and carried with one dissentient :- That the Cambridge University Union Society desires to express its satisfaction that a Society based on the same principles as itself has been founded at Allygurh by one of its ex-Presidents; and as a means of displaying its sense of the brotherhood which exists between all subjects of our sovereign, and also of the close tie that binds the two Societies together, herein sends its heartfelt sympathy and congratulation to the President and members of that Society."

On 1 January 1888, Sir John Edge, the first Vice Chancellor of the Allahabad University visited the College on the occasion of the anniversary of the Siddons Union Club. The Siddons Union Club chaired by Theodore Beck had organised a debate on 15 November 1884 over the motion of 'Spread of Female Education in India is to be desired but by home tuition and not by schools and colleges'. The motion was defeated by 3 votes. In the club, Debates were held on crucial topics like Pardah System and Marriage System among Indian Mohammedans. It was a wish of Sir Syed Ahmad Khan, the founder of Mohammedan Anglo Oriental College, now Aligarh Muslim University, to make the college as intimate as possible the connection between his college and the University of Cambridge. AMU, Aligarh
