= Zakaullah Dehlvi =

Indian Urdu writer, scholar and historian (1832–1910)

Maulvi Mohammad Zakaullah
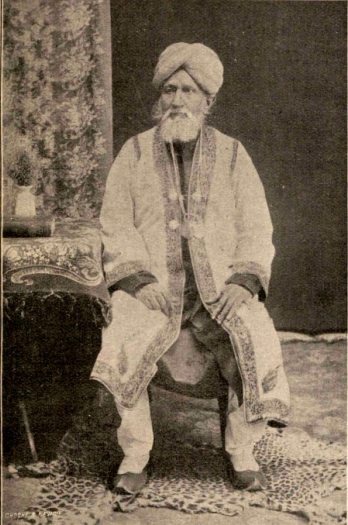
- Born: 20 April 1832; Delhi, Mughal Empire
- Died: 7 November 1910 (aged 78); Delhi, British India
- Education: Zakir Husain Delhi College (Delhi College)
- Occupations: Writer; Translator professor
- Writing career
- Pen name: Munshi Zakaullah Dehlvi
- Period: Mughal era, British Indian

Maulvi Mohammad Zakaullah or Munshi Zakaullah (20 April 1832 – 7 November 1910) was an Urdu writer and translator from British India. He wrote Tarikh-e-Hindustan, a fourteen-volume compilation of Indian history in Urdu.

== Early life and education ==
Zakaullah was born on 20 April 1832 in Delhi. His father Mohammad Sanaullah was the tutor of one of the princes in the Mughal courts. He commended his studies under his grandfather Hafiz Mohammad Barkatullah and got his education in the Delhi College under professor Ramchundra, who was a distinct mathematical teacher. His other teachers include Mamluk Ali Nanautawi.

== Career ==
He started his service as a scholar at the Delhi College and continued to serve in the education department until he was 55. At Delhi College he also headed the Vernacular Translation Society in translating texts in western sciences, history and philosophy into Urdu. In 1855, he was appointed Deputy Inspector of Schools of Bulandshahar and Muradabad. In 1866, he was then appointed the head master for the Normal School in Delhi. In 1872 he was appointed professor of vernacular literature and science at the Muir Central College in Allahabad. He retired on pension from Allahabad in 1877. Shortly before his retirement he was awarded the title of Khan Bahadur and Shams-ul-Ulema. After his retirement he spent some time in Aligarh working for the literary movement of Sir Syed Ahmad Khan and his friend Maulvi Samiullah. He was an early supporter of the Aligarh Movement and translated works for Scientific Society along with his contemporaries Maulvi Nazir Ahmad and Altaf Hussain Hali.

He died on 7 November 1910 at Delhi, aged 78. He was survived by his son Inayatullah Delhvi who was also an Urdu writer and translator.

== Literary work ==
The literary work of Maulvi Zakaullah include.

- Aain-e-Qaisari
- Falsafa-e-Imsal aur Mauntakh-ul-Imsal
- Iqbalnama-e-Akabari
- Karzan Nama
- Mabadiul Insha
- Mahasin-ul-Akhlaq
- Makarim-ul-Akhlaq
- Musalman Aur Science
- Risala Majalis-e-Munazira
- Risala Taqvim-ul-Lisan
- Sawaneh Umari
- Savaneh Umri: Haji Muhammad Samiullah Bahadur, C.M.G. – biography of Samee Ullah Khan
- Taqveem-ul-Lisan
- Tareekh-e-Hindustan
- Tareekh-e-Arooz Ahd-e-Saltanat Englishia Hind
