= Scientific Society of Aligarh =

Literary society founded in India in 1864

The Scientific Society of Aligarh was a literary society founded by Sir Syed Ahmad Khan at Aligarh, India. The main objectives of the society were to translate Western works on arts and science into vernacular languages and promote western education among the masses.

== History ==
On 9 January 1862 Sir Syed Ahmad Khan formed a translation society called Scientific Society at Ghazipur with the goal of translating scientific books of English and other European languages into Urdu and Hindi. The first meeting was held in January 1862 under the president ship of Mr. A. B. Spate, the then Collector of Ghazipur. This society was moved in April 1864 to Aligarh and henceforth also known as the Scientific Society of Aligarh. The society sought to promote liberal, modern education and Western scientific knowledge in the Muslim community in India. The society was modelled after the Royal Society and the Royal Asiatic Society. Sir Syed assembled Muslim scholars from different parts of the country and the society held annual conferences, disbursed funds for educational causes and regularly published a journal on scientific subjects in English and Urdu.

Many of the essays he wrote during this time were on topics like the Solar System, plant and animal life, human evolution, etc.

== Members ==
Jai Kishan Das, close Hindu associate of Sir Syed served as its secretary from 1867 till 1874. He was also nominated as Co-President of The Society for life. Other active members of the society included Nawab Mohsin-ul-Mulk, Nawab Abdul Latif, Zakaullah Dehlvi, Nazir Ahmad Dehlvi, and Kunwar Luft Ali Khan of Chhattari. The society also appointed two translators; Babu Ganga Prasad was an English translator and Moulvi Faiyazul Hasan was the vernacular translator.

== Institute ==
The Aligarh Scientific Society had a library and a reading room of its own. The books were mainly donated to the Society by different Indian as well as foreign gentlemen.

Sir Syed himself donated a large number of books to the library. The Society subscribed to forty-four journals and magazines in 1866. Of those, 18 were in English and rest in Urdu, Persian, Arabic and Sanskrit. It exchanged its publication with similar societies like the Society for the Diffusion of Useful Knowledge founded by Pandit Harsokh Rai at Lahore and the Mohammedan Literary Society founded by Nawab Abdul Latif at Calcutta. It also exchanged its journal with the publications of the Bengal Asiatic Society, Calcutta.

== Publications ==
Aligarh Institute Gazette was the journal of the society. It was the first bilingual journal of India.
