= United Patriotic Association =

The United Indian Patriotic Association or Alliance was a political organisation founded in 1888 by Sir Syed Ahmad Khan (the founder of the Aligarh Muslim University) and Raja Shiv Prasad Singh of Benaras. Opposed to the Indian National Congress, the group aimed to develop close ties between the Muslim community and the British Raj. The British officials encouraged reactionary elements like Sir Syed Ahmed Khan and Raja Shiv Prasad Singh of Benaras to organise the United Indian Patriotic Association in 1888 to counter Congress propaganda. It later became the Mohammaden Defence Alliance in 1893.
