= Henry George Impey Siddons =

- Born: c. 1851; Indore, India
- Died: 18 September 1936; Bath, Somerset, England

Henry George Impey Siddons (c. 1851 – 18 September 1936) was an Indian educationist. He was born in Indore, India and died on 18 September 1936 at Bath, Somerset, England.

== Career ==
Siddons was educated at the Oxford University and then he returned to India, where his father had been a Captain in the Indian Army. He was the first headmaster of Mohammadan Anglo Oriental College (M. A. O. College) between 1875 and 1884 which later on became Aligarh Muslim University. In 1880, Sir Auckland Colvin laid the foundation stone of the Colvin Taluqdars School at Lucknow. When functional, Siddons became the first principal of this as well.

The debating club Siddons Union Club at M. A. O. College was named after him. He was succeeded by Theodore Beck.

== Family ==
Siddons was the posthumous son of William Young Siddons, a Captain in Indian Army and Susan Mary Earle. He was descendant of actress Sarah Siddons (1755–1831). He requested a portrait by Thomas Beach of his ancestor Roger Kemble to the Victoria Art Gallery, Bath
