= Syed Hamid =

Indian educationist and diplomat (1920–2014)

- Born: 28 March 1920; Faizabad (UP)
- Died: 29 December 2014 (aged 94); New Delhi
- Education: Aligarh Muslim University
- Spouse: Suraiyya Hamid
- Children: Samar, Saman and Faraz Hamid

Syed Hamid (28 March 1920 – 29 December 2014) was an Indian educationist and diplomat. He was a member of Indian Administrative Service and also served as the Vice Chancellor of Aligarh Muslim University. He had also served in several important committees, including the Sachar Committee set up by the UPA government to probe the social and economic conditions of the Indian Muslim community.

== Early life and education ==
Syed Hamid was born in a Muslim family of Syed Mehdi Hasan and Sitarah Shahjahan Begum in Faizabad on 28 March 1920. The family was originally from Moradabad. Syed Mahdi Hasan was interested in history, literature and Islamic education. In 1931, Syed Hamid completed 6th grade from Moradabad Inter College and moved to Rampur where his father joined a new job in Estate of Rampur. Just after one year they moved back to Moradabad and completed his Intermediate (12th grade) from Moradabad Inter College in 1937. He completed his BA and MA from Aligarh Muslim University in English and enrolled for another MA in Persian.

== Career ==
Before he could complete his second MA, Hamid was selected for Uttar Pradesh's Provincial Civil Services in 1943. He could finally complete his MA in Persian in 1947, the year India got Independence. He served in the PCS till he joined the Indian Administrative Services (IAS) in 1949. Hamid served at various posts in the bureaucratic hierarchy both in Uttar Pradesh and in Delhi. From 1976 to 1980, he was the founder and chairman of the Staff Selection Committee. He retired in 1980 and was appointed the Vice Chancellor of his alma mater (AMU) in June 1980 where he served his full five years term.

He established Hamdard Public School, New Delhi in 1993.

In 1999, Hamid served as the Chancellor of the Delhi's Hamdard University. He also served as a member of several committees, including the management committee of the Darul Musannefin Shibli Academy, Azamgarh.

== Death and legacy ==
He died on 29 December 2014 at New Delhi.

In 2015 the Senior Secondary Schools Boys of Aligarh Muslim University was renamed as Syed Hamid Senior Secondary School Boys in his honour. The central library of Maulana Azad National Urdu University Gachibowli, Hyderabad is named after his name as Syed Hamid Central Library.

== Activities ==
Hamid was involved in some advisory capacity with dozens of educational institutions across the country..

Academic offices
Preceded by A. M. Khusro	Vice-Chancellor of AMU; 1980–1985	Succeeded by Syed Hashim Ali
