= Chiragh Ali =

Indian Muslim scholar (1844–1895)

Moulví Cherágh Ali (1844–1895) (also spelled Chirágh) was an Indian Muslim scholar of the late 19th century. As a colleague of Sir Sayyid Ahmad Khan, he made a contribution to Muslim modernism and presented reformative thinking about the Qur'an. He contributed numerous works to Muslim modernism such as A Critical Exposition of the Popular Jihad and Proposed Political, Legal and Social Reforms Under Moslem Rule. He was also known for his criticism of Hadiths. Dying at age 51 during treatment, Ali is now buried in Bombay.

== Family life ==
Born in Meerut into a family originally from Kashmir, Cherágh Ali was the oldest of three siblings Wilayat Ali, Inayat Ali and Mansib Ali. Their father, Muhammad Bakhsh died at age 35. At this point, when Cherágh was 12 years old, the responsibility of educating the family fell up their mother's as well as their grandmother's shoulders. It is known that he had a wife, Abbadi Begum.

== Education ==
Cherágh Ali was educated exclusively at home. One of his initial educational accomplishments was the acquisition of the languages of Persian, Arabic, English, French, Hebrew, Aramaic, Latin and Greek. Education and study was the most important aspect of Cherágh Ali's life. His studies led him offer a new translation of the text and message of the Qur'an as well as Muhammad's battles.

== Career ==
In his early working years, Cherágh Ali was stationed as a clerk in Gurakhpūr but eventually found himself in Lucknow searching for a better job. He then became a collector in the Office of Settlement until Sir Sayyid Ahmad Khan recommended him for a position in the government of the Nizam of Hyderabad. Cherágh had already been making some literary contributions to a variety of papers such as Mukhbir-i Sãdiq and Manshūr-i Muhhamadī. When Sir Sayyid was requested by Salar Jang I, the Prime Minister of Hyderabad State to hire a translator, Cherágh Ali was the one invited to fill that position. He was associated with Sir Sayyid throughout the rest of his career because of similar religious and political beliefs.

== Title ==
In 1888, on the occasion, of the victory celebration of the army contingent of Hyderabad who fought at the war front in Burma, Cherágh Ali was presented with the honorary victory war title Azam yar-Jung with two thousand mansab (officers), one thousand riders and a flag.

== Political life ==
Cherágh followed the school of Muslim Modernists and is most prominently known for his association with Sir Sayyid. The two met in 1874 when Sir Sayyid came to Lucknow after their literary excursions had led them there. Cherágh Ali was a solid supporter of Sir Sayyid's Aligarh Movement. Despite being a prominent civil servant, Cherágh Ali avoided getting caught up in political action in Hyderabad. Rather he let his literary works speak for themselves.

In his writings, Cherágh Ali sought to correct what he perceived to be misperceptions of Islam and jihad. These misunderstandings, he argued, came from the historical development of hadith and the activities of Muslim jurists. He believed the jurists had taken justice into their own hands and in doing so misused or completely ignored the Qur'an. In following these beliefs, Cherágh Ali was committed to offering a fresh interpretation of the Qur'an and a moderated version of jihad.

In making a point of redefining the meaning of jihad, Cherágh Ali described the wars of Muhammad as strictly defensive. He argued that all of Muhammad's wars were local and temporary, making them defensive because the Qur'an does not teach a war of aggression. He argued that Muhammad only engaged in battle in response to acts that contradicted the Qur'an's teachings. Cherágh's belief that Islam is misunderstood by the majority of the world motivated his reformation of the Qur'an.

== Selected list of works ==
- The Proposed political legal and social reforms (in The Ottoman Empire and Other Mohammadan States) - printed in English by Education Society's Press, Byculla - 1883 - is available on Digital Library of India
- The Administration Under Salarjung Prime Minister of Hyderabad - printed in English - 1884 - is available on Digital Library of India
- Hyderabad (Deccan) Under Sir Salar Jung Vol. 1 - printed in English by Education Society's Press, Byculla - 1884 - is available on Digital Library of India
- Hyderabad (Deccan) Under Sir Salar Jung Vol. 2 - printed in English by Education Society's Press, Byculla - 1885 - is available on Digital Library of India
- A Critical Exposition of the Popular 'Jihád' - printed in English by Thacker, Spink And Co, Calcatta 1885 - is available on Project Gutenberg
- Hyderabad (Deccan) Under Sir Salar Jung Vol. 3 - printed in English by Education Society's Press, Byculla - 1886 - is available on Digital Library of India
- Azam ul Kalam fi Irtiqa il Islam Vol 1 and 2 - printed in Urdu - 1910 - is available on Digital Library of India
