= Theodore Beck =

British academic (1859–1899)

Personal details
- Born: 4 July 1859 Stoke Newington, London, England
- Died: 2 September 1899 (aged 40) Simla, Punjab, British India

Theodore Beck (4 July 1859 – 2 September 1899) was a Quaker and British educationalist working for the British Raj in India. From 1883 until his death in 1899 he was Principal of Muhammadan Anglo-Oriental College, which later became Aligarh Muslim University.

== Early life ==
Theodore Beck was the son of Joseph Beck (1829–1891), an optical instrument manufacturer. Joseph Beck was a member of the Anti-Slavery Society, Treasurer of the Friends War Victims Relief Committee during the Franco-Prussian War, and led the campaign ensuring Clissold Park became a public park.

Theodore was educated at the University of London and Trinity College, Cambridge. He was President of the Cambridge Union in 1882, and an active member of the Cambridge Apostles, a student society founded by Frederick Denison Maurice. He gained his Cambridge B.A. in 1883.

== Career ==
Sir Syed Ahmed Khan asked Beck to be the Principal of the Muhammadan Anglo-Oriental College in Aligarh after the first Principal, Henry George Impey Siddons, resigned in 1883 due to poor health. He was appointed Principal in 1883, aged only 24, taking charge of the college on 1 February 1864 and serving as Principal until his death in 1899.

Beck succeeded Henry George Impey Siddons, the first Principal of M.A.O College in Aligarh, and served as Principal from 1883 to 1899. He was one of the secretaries of the Mohammedan Defence Association.

He was the founder President of Siddons Union Club at Muhammadan Anglo-Oriental College in 1884.

He edited Aligarh Institute Gazette.

After Sir Syed died in 1898, Beck devoted himself to an appeal for a "Sir Syed Memorial fund". He wrote articles, delivered speeches and visited Allahabad and elsewhere to collect funds for raising a suitable memorial and setting up Sir Syed's dream of a Muslim University. In order to raise MAO College to the status of Muslim University, Beck aimed to collect a sum of Rs. 1,000,000. He succeeded in persuading Englishmen as well as Muslims to contribute: the Viceroy Lord Elgin contributed Rs. 2,000. However, Beck's own health began to fail as he worked upon the appeal. Though he moved to Simla to recuperate, he died there on 2 September 1899. After he died his younger sister Emma Josephine Beck returned to Britain where she became the secretary of the National Indian Association.

== Beck manzil ==
Old Boys living at Meerut held a meeting on 10 September 1899 and decided to raise a fund to commemorate Beck's memory. They collected a sum of Rs. 465/- on the spot, and the Beck Fund eventually amounted to Rs. 6,000/-. The money was used to build the hall adjacent to the Lytton Library, which was named "Beck Manzil".
