= Syed Hashim Ali =

Syed Hashim Ali was the Vice-Chancellor of Aligarh Muslim University, taking office in 1986.

He served as the vice-chancellor of Osmania University between 1982 and 1986.
