= Syed Ahmad Khan =

Indian reformer and social activist (1817–1898)

Sir Syed Ahmed Khan KCSI FRAS
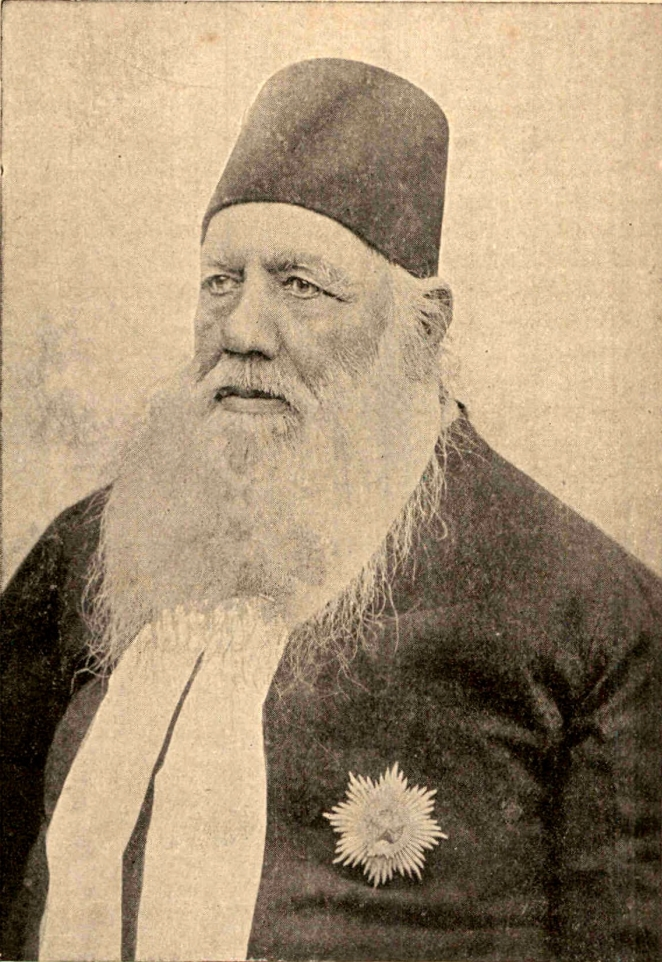
- Syed Ahmad Khan
- Born: 17 October 1817; Delhi, Mughal Empire
- Died: 27 March 1898 (aged 80); Aligarh, North-Western Provinces, British India
- Burial place: Sir Syed Mosque, Aligarh Muslim University
- Other name: Sir Syed
- Children: Syed Mahmood
- Relatives: Ross Masood (grandson)
- Awards: Star of India

Philosophical work
- Era: 19th-century
- School: Islamic and Renaissance philosophy
- Institutions: East India Company; Indian Judicial Branch; Aligarh Muslim University; Punjab University; Government College University
- Main interests: Pragmatism; Metaphysics; Language; Aesthetics; Christianity and Islam
- Notable works: The Mohammadan Commentary on the Holy Quran (tafsir on Quran).
- Notable ideas: Two-nation theory; Muslim adoption of modernist ideas

Sir Syed Ahmad Khan (Note: KCSI, FRAS) (17 October 1817 – 27 March 1898), also spelled Sayyid Ahmad Khan, was an Indian Muslim reformer, philosopher, and educationist in nineteenth-century British India.

Though initially espousing Hindu–Muslim unity, he later became the pioneer of Muslim nationalism in India and is widely credited as the father of the two-nation theory, which formed the basis of the Pakistan movement. Born into a family with strong ties to the Mughal court, Ahmad studied science and the Quran within the court. He was awarded an honorary LLD from the University of Edinburgh in 1889.

In 1838, Syed Ahmad entered the service of East India Company and went on to become a judge at a Small Causes Court in 1867, retiring from this position in 1876. During the Indian Mutiny of 1857, he remained loyal to the British Raj and was noted for his actions in saving European lives. After the rebellion, he penned the booklet The Causes of the Indian Mutiny – a daring critique, at the time, of various British policies that he blamed for causing the revolt. Believing that the future of Muslims was threatened by the rigidity of their orthodox outlook, Sir Ahmad began promoting Western–style scientific education by founding modern schools and journals and organising Islamic entrepreneurs. He founded Victoria School at Ghazipur in 1863 and a scientific society for Muslims in 1864. In 1875, he founded the Muhammadan Anglo-Oriental College, the first Muslim university in Southern Asia. During his career, Syed repeatedly called upon Muslims to loyally serve the British Raj and promoted the adoption of Urdu as the lingua franca of all Indian Muslims. He disagreed with the Indian National Congress over parliamentary democracy, believing it would lack impartiality given the widespread communal tensions and limitations of education in South Asia. He remained committed to secularism and inclusive politics.

Sir Syed maintains a strong legacy in Pakistan and among Indian Muslims. He became a source of inspiration for the Pakistan Movement and its activists, including Allama Iqbal and Muhammad Ali Jinnah. His advocacy of Islam's rationalist tradition, and a broader, radical reinterpretation of the Quran to make it compatible with science and modernity, continues to influence the global Islamic reformation. Many universities and public buildings in Pakistan bear Sir Syed's name. Aligarh Muslim University celebrated Sir Syed's 200th birth centenary with much enthusiasm on 17 October 2017.

== Early life ==
Do not show the face of Islam to others; instead show your face as the follower of true Islam representing character, knowledge, tolerance and piety.

— Sir Syed Ahmad Khan

Syed Ahmad Taqvi 'Khan Bahadur' was born on 17 October 1817 to Syed Muhammad Muttaqi and Aziz-un-Nisa in Delhi, which was the capital of the Mughal Empire during the reign of Mughal Emperor Akbar II. Many generations of his family had been highly connected with the Mughal administration. His maternal grandfather Khwaja Fariduddin served as Wazir in the court of Emperor Akbar Shah II. His paternal grandfather Syed Hadi Jawwad bin Imaduddin held a mansab (lit. General) – a high-ranking administrative position - and the honorary name of "Mir Jawwad Ali Khan" in the court of Emperor Alamgir II. Sir Syed's father, Syed Muhammad Muttaqi, was personally close to Emperor Akbar Shah II and served as his personal adviser. However, Syed Ahmad was born at a time when his father was involved in regional insurrections aided and led by the East India Company, which had replaced the power traditionally held by the Mughal state, reducing its monarch to a figurehead.

Syed Ahmad was the youngest of three siblings. With his elder brother Syed Muhammad bin Muttaqi Khan and elder sister Safiyatun Nisa, Sir Syed was raised in the house of his maternal grandfather in a wealthy area of the city. They were raised in strict accordance with Mughal noble traditions and they were exposed to politics. Their mother Aziz-un-Nisa played a formative role in Sir Syed's early life, raising him with rigid discipline and a strong emphasis on modern education.

== Education ==
Sir Syed's education was initiated by Shah Ghulam Ali, his father's spiritual mentor in 1822. He was taught to read and understand the Qur'an by a female tutor Areeba Sehar. He received an education traditional to Muslim nobility in Delhi. He attended a maktab run by a learned scholar, Moulvi Hamiduddin, in a house adjacent to his ancestral home and started learning Persian and Arabic. He read the works of Muslim scholars and writers such as Sahbai, Zauq and Ghalib. Other tutors instructed him in mathematics, astronomy and algebra. He also pursued the study of medicine for several years under Hakim Ghulam Haider Khan. Sir Syed was also adept at swimming, shooting and other sports. He took an active part in the Mughal court's cultural activities and attended parties, festivals and recitations.

Syed Ahmad's elder brother launched a weekly, “Syedul Akhbar”, from Delhi, which was one of the earliest Urdu newspapers in northern India. Until the death of his father in 1838, Sir Syed had lived a life customary for an affluent young Muslim noble. Upon his father's death, he inherited the titles of his grandfather and father and was awarded the title of Arif Jung by the emperor Bahadur Shah Zafar. Financial difficulties put an end to Sir Syed's formal education, although he continued to study in private, using books on a variety of subjects.

== Career ==
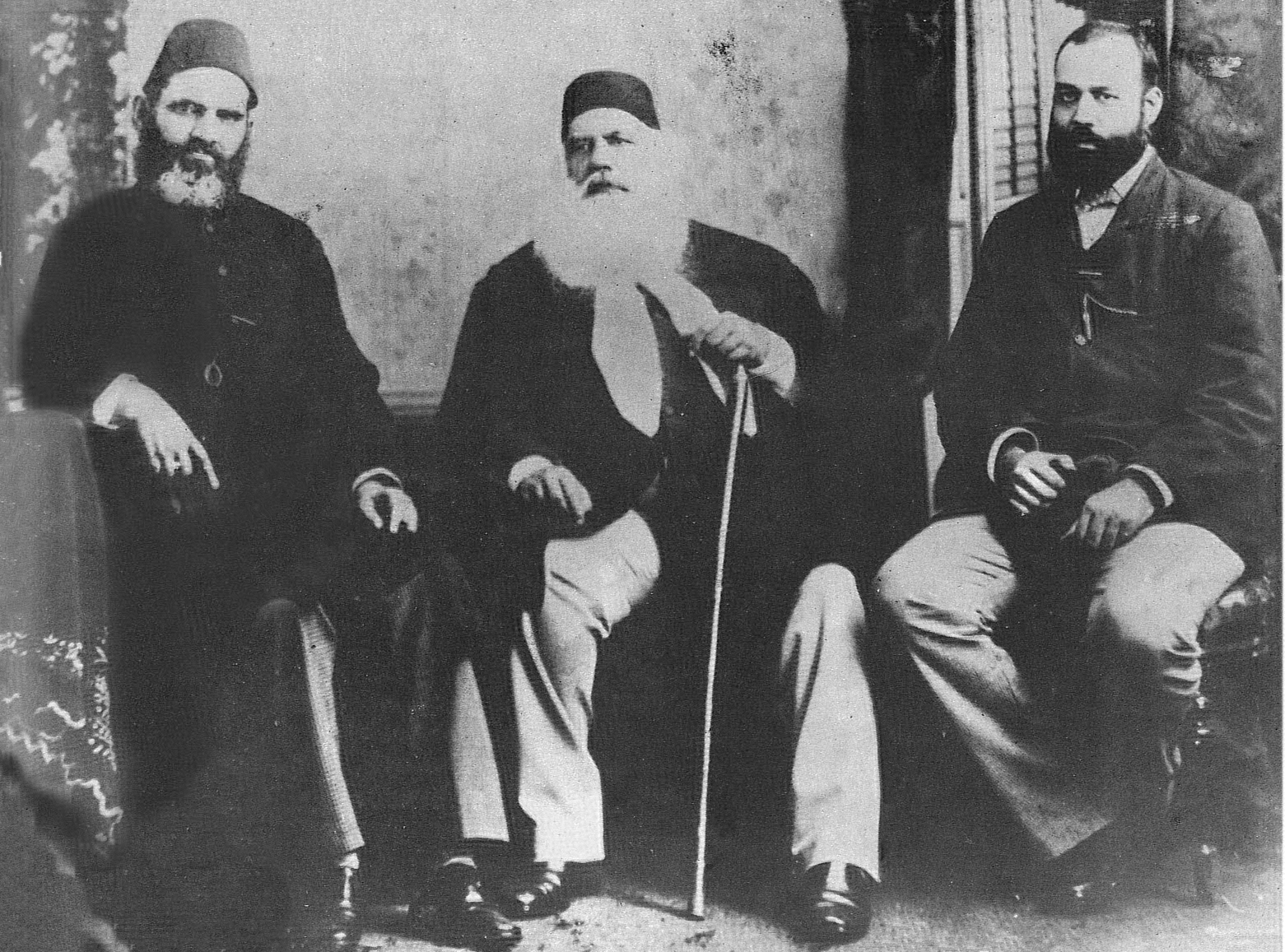
Nawab Mohsin-ul-Mulk, Sir Syed Ahmad Khan, Justice Syed Mahmood, he was the first Muslim to serve as a High Court judge in the British Raj.

Having recognised the steady decline in Mughal political power, Sir Syed decided to enter the service of the East India Company. He could not enter the colonial civil service because it was only in the 1860s that Indians were admitted. His first appointment was as a Serestadar (lit. Clerk) of the Criminal Department in the Sadr Amin's office in Delhi, responsible for record-keeping and managing court affairs. In February 1839, he was transferred to Agra and promoted to the title of Naib Munshi or deputy reader in the office of the Commissioner. In 1841 he was appointed as the Munsif or Sub-Judge of Fatehpur Sikri and later transferred to Delhi in 1846. He remained in Delhi until 1854 except for two short-term postings to Rohtak as officiating Sadr Amin in 1850 and 1853. In 1855 he was promoted to the post of Sadr Amin in Bijnor.

Acquainted with high-ranking British officials, Sir Syed obtained close knowledge about British colonial politics during his service at the courts. At the outbreak of the Indian rebellion, on 10 May 1857, Sir Syed was serving as the chief assessment officer at the court in Bijnor. He stood by the British officers of Bijnor and saved the lives of many officers and their family members from the revolting soldiers. The conflict had left large numbers of civilians dead. Erstwhile centres of Muslim power such as Delhi, Agra, Lucknow and Kanpur were severely affected. He lost several close relatives who died in the violence. Although he succeeded in rescuing his mother from the turmoil, she died in Meerut, owing to the privations she had experienced.

In 1858, he was appointed as Sadarus Sudoor, a high-ranking post at the court in Muradabad, where he began working on his most famous literary work, The Cause of the Indian Revolt. In 1862, he was transferred to Ghazipur, and later to Aligarh in 1864. In 1864 he was sent to Banaras and elevated to the position of a Sub-Judge of Small Causes.

In April 1869, he accompanied his two sons Syed Hamid and Syed Mahmood to England, the latter had obtained a scholarship to study in England.

Sir Syed retired from government service in 1876 and settled in Aligarh. In 1878, he was nominated as an additional member of the Imperial Legislative Council, which he served from July 1878 to July 1880. He also served a second term that lasted until 1883. He served the Legislative Council of the Lieutenant Governor of the North- Western Provinces for two terms from 1887 until 1893.

== Influences ==
Sir Syed's early influences were his mother Aziz-un-Nisa and maternal grandfather Khwaja Fariduddin both of whom took special interest in his education. Apart from serving as a Wazir in the Mughal court, Khwaja Fariduddin was also a teacher, mathematician and astronomer. He was also disposed towards Sufism, which left its impact on Sir Syed since his early childhood. His maternal uncle Khwaja Zainuddin Ahmad, who was an expert in music and mathematics, also influenced him in his early days.

Sir Syed's early theological writings demonstrate the influence of three school of religious thought on his outlook - the Naqshbandi tradition of Shah Ghulam Ali Dahlavi, Shah Waliullah Dehlawi and his teachings, and the Mujahidin movement of Syed Ahmad Barelvi and his earliest disciple Shah Ismail Dehlvi. While Sir Syed shared the desire for religious forms in India with the Mujahidin movement, he was opposed to the Indian Wahhabi movement.

During his formative years in Delhi he came in contact with Ghalib and Zauq whose exquisite style of prose and poetry influenced Sir Syed's style of writing. He would often visit Imam Baksh Sahbai and Sadruddin Khan Azurda Dehlawi in his learning years. Another influence on him was his teacher and friend in Agra, Nur al Hasan of Kandhala, a teacher in Arabic at Agra College in the early 1840s who encouraged and corrected his early works.

He was also influenced by the works of the Tunisian reformer Hayreddin Pasha and adopted his approach of utilising freedom of expression for bringing reforms in the Muslim community.

The western writers who most influenced his political thoughts were the Utilitarians such as John Stuart Mill, whose works he often quoted in his own writings. He was also influenced by the essays of Joseph Addison and Richard Steele and modelled his own journals after their Tatler and Spectator.

== Literary works ==
While continuing to work as a junior clerk, Sir Syed began focusing on writing, from the age of 23 (in 1840), on various subjects (from mechanics to educational issues), mainly in Urdu, where he wrote, at least, 6000 pages. He also wrote a well known book on archaeology called Athar-ul-Sandeed. He also developed interest in literature as he met a few of India's well known writers.

=== Religious works ===
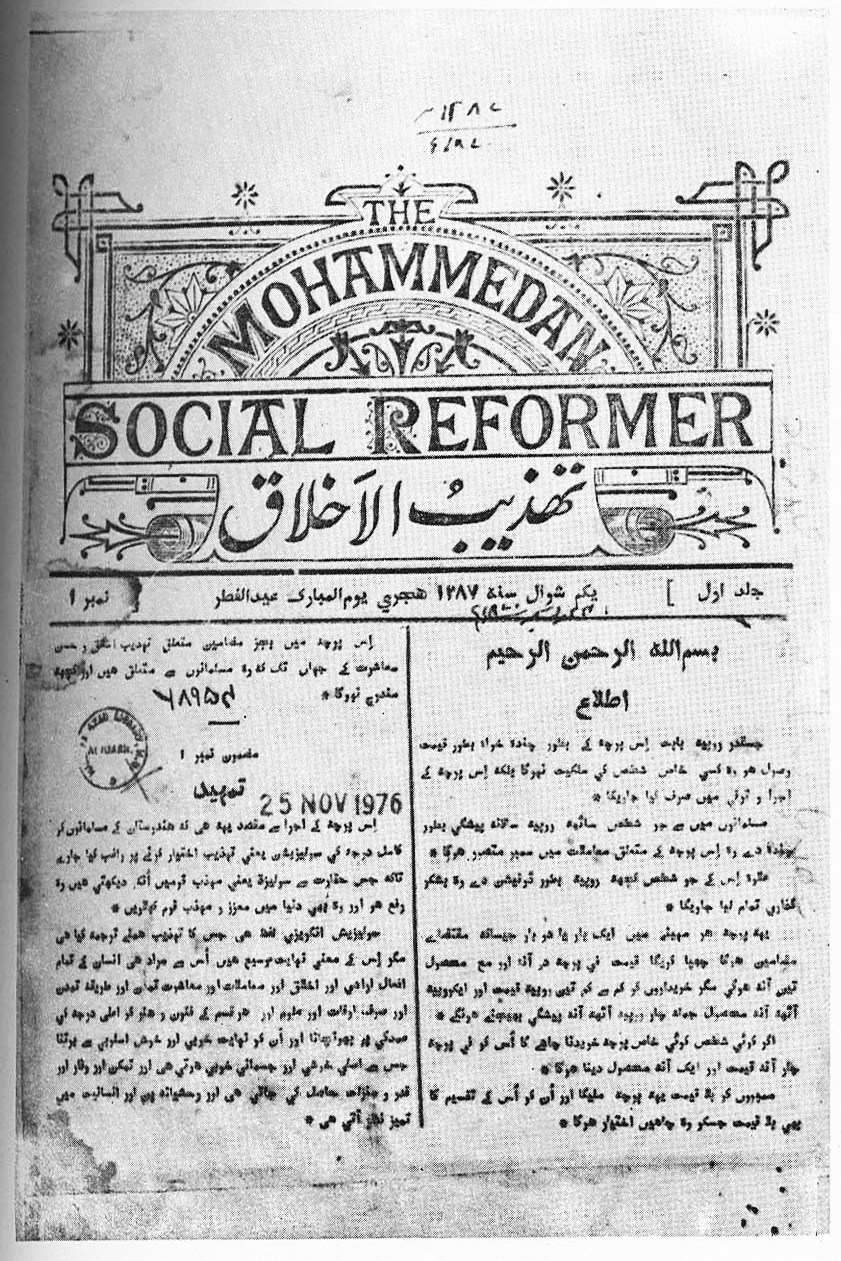
First issue of the journal Muhammadan Social Reformer dated 24 December 1870, it was a pioneering publication initiated by Sir Syed to promote liberal ideas in Muslim society.

Sir Syed Ahmad Khan's career as an author began when he published a series of treatises in Urdu on religious subjects in 1842. In his early religious writings his religious thoughts were more orthodox; over time, with his increasing contact with the West, his views gradually became more independent. His early works show the influence of Sufism and his upbringing in Delhi. The main themes of these works are popularisation of the practices of the Islamic prophet Muhammad as the one true path and the desire to reform the lives of Indian Muslims from religious innovations, thus endeavoring for the purity of Islamic belief in India.

His later religious writings, such as his commentary on the Torah and Gospel and his essays on Muhammad, were stimulated in response to Christian missionary activities in India and the aggressive view of British historians towards Islam.

==== Early treatises ====
His first treatise published in 1842 was a biographical sketch of Muhammad, called Jila al-Qulub bi Zikr al-Mahbub (Delight of the Hearts in Remembering the Beloved), in line with the reformist ideas of Shah Waliullah. It was prose for recitation on Mawlid written in idiomatic Urdu. He published his second treatise Tuhfa-i Hasan (The Gift to Hasan) in 1844 on the encouragement of his friend Nur al Hasan. It is an Urdu translation of the tenth and twelfth chapter of Shah Abdul Aziz Dehlavi's Tuhfah-i Ithna Ashariyya (A treatise on the 12 Imams), which was a critique of Shia beliefs. The tenth chapter deals and answers the Shia accusations against the Sahabi and Hazrat Aisha and the twelfth deals with the Shia doctrines of tawalli and tabarri.

His third treatise, entitled Kalimat al-Haqq (The True Discourse), was published in 1849. It is a critique of the prevalent Sufi practices around pir–murid relationships. The first part of the work is devoted to the concept of piri. In this part, he argues that Muhammad is the only valid pir. The work's second part is focused on muridi and the notion of bay'ah. He calls for reforms in the pir-murid relationship and the associated practises. Rah i Sunna dar radd i Bid'a (The Sunna and the Rejection of Innovations), his fourth treatise, was published in 1850. In this work, he expressed his opposition to certain religious practices and beliefs of his fellow Muslims, which he felt were mixed with innovation and deviated from the true Sunnah. In 1852 he published Namiqa dar bayan masala tasawwur-i-Shaikh (A Letter Explaining the Teaching of tasawwur i shaikh), in which he defended tasawwur-i-Shaikh, the Sufi practice of visualising within, the image of one's spiritual guide. In 1853 he translated some passages of al-Ghazali's Kimiya al-Sa'ada (The Alchemy of Happiness).

==== Commentary of the Torah and Gospel ====
In 1862 while stationed at Ghazipur, Sir Syed started working on a commentary on the Bible and its teaching, with the aim to explain them in terms of Islam. It was published in Urdu and English in three parts from 1862 to 1865 under the title Tabin al-al-kalam Fi tafsir altawrat Wa ‘I-injil’ala millat al Islam (Elucidation of the World in Commentary of the Torah and Gospel According to the Religion of Islam). While the first part deals with the Islamic approach towards biblical writings, the second and third part contains commentary on the Book of Genesis and the Gospel of Matthew respectively.

==== Essays on the Life of Muhammad ====
In 1869 he wrote Al-Khutbat al-Ahmadiya fi'l Arab wa'I Sirat al-Muhammadiya (A Series of Essays on the Life of Prophet Muhammad and Subjects Subsidiary Therein) as a rejoinder to William Muir's widely known four-part book, The Life of Mahomet published in 1864. He was deeply distressed by Muir's portrayal of Islam and the character of Muhammad. He was concerned that the book might create doubts among the younger generation of Muslims. In order to prepare for the book, he accompanied his son to England, as he wanted to get a first-hand impression of Western civilisation.

He was also a reader of Darwin and, while not agreeing with all of his ideas, he could be described as a sort of theistic evolutionist like his contemporary Asa Gray. Syed Ahmad was one of the first in the Islamic world to adopt this view. His arguments in favour of the idea were based on both findings from his own scientific research and quotes from earlier Islamic scholars like Al-Jahiz, Ibn Khaldun and Shah Waliullah.

==== Tafsir-ul-Quran ====
Sir Syed started working on a tafsir, or commentary on the Quran, in 1877. It was published as Tafsir ul-Quran in seven volumes; the first volume appeared in 1880 and the last volume was published six years after his death in 1904. In this work, he analysed and interpreted 16 paras and 13 surahs of the Quran. In the first volume, he also included a detailed article titled Tahrir fi Usool al-Tafsir (The Notes on the Principles of Commentary), in which he laid down 15 principles on which he based his commentary.

=== Historical works ===
History was Sir Syed's preferred area of study and in 1840, Sir Syed compiled a book of chronological tables about the Timurid rulers of Delhi from Timur to Bahadur Shah Zafar at the behest of Robert N. C. Hamilton, his patron. It was later published under the title Jam-i-Jum (Jamshed's Cup). In Silsilat-ul-Mulk he compiled the biographical data of all the rulers of Delhi in history. During his stay in Bijnor, he wrote a history on the city of Bijnor, but it was destroyed during the 1857 rebellion. He also wrote critical editions of books like Ziauddin Barani's Tarikh-e-Firoz Shahi published in 1862, and Tuzk-e-Jahangiri published in 1864. However, his most important historical works that brought him fame as a scholar were the two editions of Asar-us-Sanadid and that of the Ain-e-Akbari.

==== Asar-us-Sanadid ====
In 1847, he published the book Asar-us-Sanadid (The Remnants of Ancient Heroes) documenting antiquities of Delhi dating from the medieval era. The work is divided into four sections: the first describes the buildings outside the city of Delhi; the second describes the buildings around the Delhi Fort; the third describes the monuments in Shahjahanabad; and the last section presents a brief historical account of the various settlements of Delhi as well as the prominent inhabitants of Delhi, including Sufis (such as Shah Ghulam Ali and Saiyid Ahmad Shahid), physicians, scholars, poets, calligraphers, and musicians. It also contained around 130 illustrations drawn by Faiz Ali Khan and Mirza Shahrukh Beg, which were the first lithographically produced book illustrations in India. Syed Ahmad released the second edition of Ansar-as-Sanadid in 1854. However, the second edition was radically different from the first – the second was abbreviated and more factual. This work brought Sir Syed a wider fame and earned him the reputation of a cultured scholar. In 1861, it was translated into French by Gracin de Tassy in Paris. The book was also presented to the Royal Asiatic Society of Great Britain and Ireland in London, which made him an honorary fellow.

==== Ain-e-Akbari ====
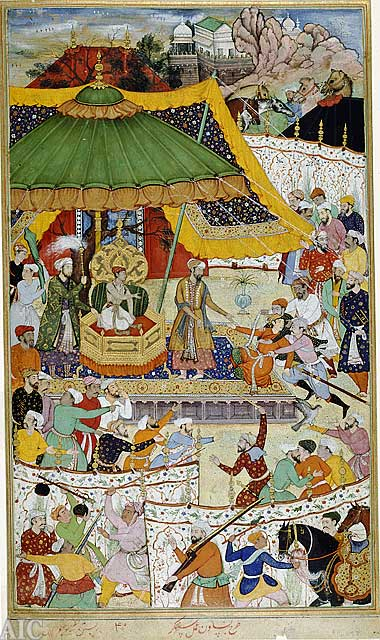
The court of Akbar, an illustration from a manuscript of the Ain-e-Akbari

In 1855, he finished his scholarly, and illustrated edition of Abul Fazl's A'in-e Akbari. The first and the third volume of the work were both published in 1855. The second volume, sent to the publisher in 1857, was destroyed in the rebellion that took place that year. Having finished the work to his satisfaction, and believing that Mirza Asadullah Khan Ghalib was a person who would appreciate his labours, Syed Ahmad approached the great Ghalib to write a taqriz (in the convention of the times, a laudatory foreword) for it. Ghalib obliged, but what he did produce was a short Persian poem castigating the A'in-e Akbari, and by implication, the imperial, sumptuous, literate and learned Mughal culture of which it was a product. The least that could be said against it was that the book had little value even as an antique document. Ghalib practically reprimanded Syed Ahmad Khan for wasting his talents and time on dead things. Worse, he praised sky-high the "sahibs of England" who at that time held all the keys to all the a’ins in this world.

Sir Syed Ahmad Khan never again wrote a word in praise of the A'in-e Akbari and in fact gave up taking an active interest in history and archaeology. He did edit another two historical texts over the next few years, but neither of them was anything like the A'in: a vast and triumphalist document on the governance of Akbar.

=== Political works ===
During the uprising of 1857, Sir Syed was posted as a chief assessment officer at the court in Bijnor. He recorded the history of the mutiny in Tarikh i Sarkashi-ye Bijnor (History of the Bijnor Rebellion), which was published in 1858. He was deeply worried about the consequences of the mutiny for his fellow Muslims in particular. He wrote a number of articles and pamphlets such as Asbab-e-Baghawat-e-Hind (The Causes of the Indian Revolt), Loyal Muhammadans of India, and Review on Dr Hunter's Indian Musalmans: Are They Bound in Conscience to Rebel Against the Queen? to defend Muslims and Islam and create a cordial relations between the British authorities and the Muslim community.

==== Causes of the Indian Revolt ====
Sir Syed supported the East India Company during the 1857 uprising, a role which has been criticised by some nationalists such as Jamaluddin Afghani. In 1859 Sir Syed published the booklet Asbab-e-Baghawat-e-Hind (The Causes of the Indian Revolt) in Urdu in which he studied the causes of the Indian revolt. In this, his most famous work, he rejected the common notion that the conspiracy was planned by Muslim elites, who resented the diminishing influence of Muslim monarchs. He blamed the East India Company for its aggressive expansion as well as the ignorance of British politicians regarding Indian culture. Sir Syed advised the British to appoint Muslims to assist in administration, to prevent what he called ‘haramzadgi’ (a vulgar deed) such as the mutiny.

Maulana Altaf Hussain Hali wrote in the biography of Sir Syed that:

"As soon as Sir Syed reached Muradabad, he began to write the pamphlet entitled The Causes of the Indian Revolt (Asbab-e-Baghawat-e-Hind), in which he did his best to clear the people of India, and especially the Muslims, of the charge of Mutiny. In spite of the obvious danger, he made a courageous and thorough report of the accusations people were making against the Government and refused theory which the British had invented to explain the causes of the Mutiny."

When the work was finished, without waiting for an English translation, Sir Syed sent the Urdu version to be printed at the Mufassilat Gazette Press in Agra. Within a few weeks, he received 500 copies back from the printers. One of his friends warned him not to send the pamphlet to the British Parliament or to the Government of India. Rae Shankar Das, a great friend of Sir Syed, begged him to burn the books rather than put his life in danger. Sir Syed replied that he was bringing these matters to the attention of the British for the good of his own people, of his country, and of the government itself. He said that if he came to any harm while doing something that would greatly benefit the rulers and the subjects of India alike, he would gladly suffer whatever befell him. When Rae Shankar Das saw that Sir Syed's mind was made up and nothing could be done to change it, he wept and remained silent. After performing a supplementary prayer and asking God's blessing, Sir Syed sent almost all the 500 copies of his pamphlet to England, one to the government, and kept the rest himself.

When the government of India had the book translated and presented before the council, Lord Canning, the governor-general, and Sir Bartle Frere accepted it as a sincere and friendly report. The foreign secretary Cecil Beadon, however, severely attacked it, calling it 'an extremely seditious pamphlet'. He wanted a proper inquiry into the matter and said that the author, unless he could give a satisfactory explanation, should be harshly dealt with. Since no other member of the Council agreed with his opinion, his attack did no harm.

Later, Sir Syed was invited to attend Lord Canning's durbar in Farrukhabad and happened to meet the foreign secretary there. He told Sir Syed that he was displeased with the pamphlet and added that if he had really had the government's interests at heart, he would not have made his opinion known in this way throughout the country; he would have communicated it directly to the government. Sir Syed replied that he had only had 500 copies printed, the majority of which he had sent to England, one had been given to the government of India, and the remaining copies were still in his possession. Furthermore, he had the receipt to prove it. He was aware, he added, that the view of the rulers had been distorted by the stress and anxieties of the times, which made it difficult to put even the most straightforward problem in its right perspective. It was for this reason that he had not communicated his thoughts publicly. He promised that for every copy that could be found circulating in India he would personally pay 1,000 rupees. At first, Beadon was not convinced and asked Sir Syed over and over again if he was sure that no other copy had been distributed in India. Sir Syed reassured him on this matter, and Beadon never mentioned it again. Later he became one of Sir Syed's strongest supporters.

Many official translations were made of the Urdu text of The Causes of the Indian Revolt. The one undertaken by the India Office formed the subject of many discussions and debates. The pamphlet was also translated by the government of India and several members of parliament, but no version was offered to the public. A translation which had been started by Auckland Colvin, a government official was finished by Sir Syed's friend, Colonel G.F.I. Graham, and finally published in 1873.

==== Loyal Muhammadans of India ====
In 1860, Sir Syed wrote a series of bilingual pamphlets called the Risala Khair Khwahan-e Musalmanan-e-Hind (An Account of the Loyal Mohammedans of India) from Meerut containing episodes in the life of those Muslims who stood by the British during the 1857 uprising. It was published in three issues, the first and second issues appeared in 1860, while the third was published in 1861. The first issue highlighted the bravery of those Muslims who stood by the British while the second issue carried an article on jihad in which he makes a clear distinction between jihad and rebellion.

==== Review on Hunter's Indian Musalmans ====
In August 1871 William Wilson Hunter, a Scottish historian and member of the Indian Civil Service published Indian Musalmans: Are They Bound in Conscience to Rebel Against the Queen? in which he discussed the Indian Wahabi movement, its role in the rebellion and argued that the Muslims were a threat to the Empire. Hunter links Wahhabism with rebellion and terms them as self-stylised jihadis. His accusations led to the prosecution of Muslims in India especially in the North Western Provinces and those associated with Wahhabism were severely punished. Many Muslims found his arguments one-sided and this prompted Sir Syed to write a rejoinder of the book. He reviewed the book in The Pioneer in a series of articles which were reprinted in Aligarh Institute Gazette from 24 November 1871, to 23 February 1872. They were later collected and published in a book in England by Hafiz Ahmad Hasan, the Vakil of Tonk. Sir Syed based his arguments upon Muhammad's own conduct during holy wars.

== Muslim reformer ==
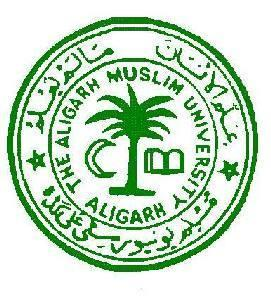
The logo of Aligarh University, whose moto is Taught man that which he knew not. (Qur'an 96:5)

Through the 1850s, Syed Ahmad Khan began developing a strong passion for education. While pursuing studies of different subjects including European jurisprudence, Sir Syed began to realise the advantages of Western-style education, which was being offered at newly established colleges across India. Despite being a devout Muslim, Sir Syed criticised the influence of traditional dogma and religious orthodoxy, which had made most Indian Muslims suspicious of British influences. Sir Syed began feeling increasingly concerned for the future of Muslim communities. A scion of Mughal nobility, Sir Syed had been reared in the finest traditions of Muslim elite culture and was aware of the steady decline of Muslim political power across India. The animosity between the British and Muslims before and after the Indian Rebellion of 1857 threatened to marginalise Muslim communities across India for many generations.

=== Scientific Society ===
Sir Syed intensified his work to promote co-operation with British authorities, promoting loyalty to the Empire amongst Indian Muslims. Committed to working for the upliftment of Muslims, Sir Syed founded a modern madrassa in Muradabad in 1859; this was one of the first religious schools to impart scientific education. Sir Syed also worked on social causes, helping to organise relief for the famine-struck people of North-West Province in 1860. While posted in Ghazipur in 1863, he established a madrasa which later became the Victoria High school. He also formed the Scientific Society in Ghazipur to promote educational reforms across the country. He wrote an insightful tract on education titled Iltimas Ba Khidmat-e-Sakinan-e-Hind Dar Bab-e- Taraqqi Taleem in Ahl-e-Hind (Address to the natives of Hindoostan on education).

Upon his transfer to Aligarh in 1864, Sir Syed began working wholeheartedly as an educator. The Scientific Society was transferred from Ghazipur to Aligarh and rechristened as the Scientific Society of Aligarh. Modelling it after the Royal Society and the Royal Asiatic Society, Sir Syed assembled Muslim scholars from different parts of the country. The Society held annual conferences, disbursed funds for educational causes and regularly published a journal on scientific subjects in English and Urdu. Sir Syed felt that the socio-economic future of Muslims was threatened by their orthodox aversions to modern science and technology. He published many writings promoting liberal, rational interpretations of Islamic scriptures, struggling to find rational interpretations for jinn, angels, and miracles of the prophets. One example was the reaction to his argument – which appeared in his tafsir (exegesis) of the Quran – that riba referred to interest charges when lending money to the poor, but not to the rich, nor to borrowers "in trade or in industry", since this finance supported "trade, national welfare and prosperity". While many jurists declared all interest to be riba, (according to Sir Syed) this was based "on their own authority and deduction" rather than the Quran.

=== Muhammadan Anglo-Oriental College ===
On 1 April 1869 he went, along with his sons Syed Mahmood and Syed Hamed, to England, where he was awarded the Order of the Star of India from the British government on 6 August. Travelling across England, he visited its colleges and was inspired by the culture of learning established after the Renaissance. Sir Syed returned to India in the following year determined to build a school modelled on Cambridge and Oxford imparting modern education to Indians. Upon his return, he established the Khwastgaran-i-Taraqqi-i-Talim-i-Musalman (Committee for the Better Diffusion and Advancement of Learning among Muhammadans) on 26 December 1870. By 1872, it was converted into a Fund Committee for the establishment of a school. Sir Syed described his vision of the institution he proposed to establish in an article written sometime in 1872 and re-printed in the Aligarh Institute Gazette of 5 April 1911:

I may appear to be dreaming and talking like Shaikh Chilli, but we aim to turn this MAO College into a University similar to that of Oxford or Cambridge. Like the churches of Oxford and Cambridge, there will be mosques attached to each College... The College will have a dispensary with a Doctor and a compounder, besides a Unani Hakim. It will be mandatory on boys in residence to join the congregational prayers (namaz) at all the five times. Students of other religions will be exempted from this religious observance. Muslim students will have a uniform consisting of a black alpaca, half-sleeved chugha and a red Fez cap... Bad and abusive words which boys generally pick up and get used to, will be strictly prohibited. Even such a word as a "liar" will be treated as an abuse to be prohibited. They will have food either on tables of European style or on chaukis in the manner of the Arabs... Smoking of cigarette or huqqa and the chewing of betels shall be strictly prohibited. No corporal punishment or any such punishment as is likely to injure a student's self-respect will be permissible... It will be strictly enforced that Shia and Sunni boys shall not discuss their religious differences in the College or in the boarding house. At present it is like a day dream. I pray to God that this dream may come true."

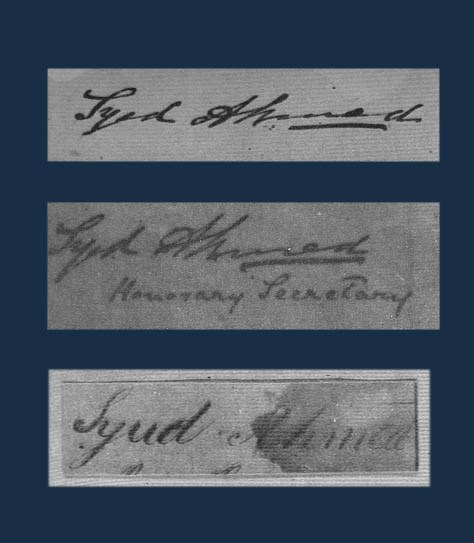
Signatures of Sir Syed

He began publishing the journal Tehzeeb-ul-Akhlaq (Social Reformer) on 24 December 1870 to spread awareness and knowledge on modern subjects and promote reforms in Muslim society. Sir Syed worked to promote reinterpretation of Muslim ideology in order to reconcile tradition with Western education. He argued in several books on Islam that the Qur'an rested on an appreciation of reason and natural law, making scientific inquiry important to being a good Muslim.

By 1873, the committee under Sir Syed issued proposals for the construction of a college in Aligarh. Maulvi Samiullah Khan was appointed as the secretary of the sub-committee of the proposed school. Members of the committee toured the country in order to raise funds for the school, which was finally established on 24 May 1875 in Aligarh as the Muhammadan Anglo-Oriental Collegiate School. Two years later, in 1877, the school was converted into the Muhammadan Anglo-Oriental College. He retired from his career as a jurist the following year, concentrating entirely on developing the college and on religious reform. Sir Syed's pioneering work received support from the British. Although intensely criticised by orthodox religious leaders hostile to modern influences, Sir Syed's new institution attracted a large student body, mainly drawn from the Muslim gentry and middle classes. However, MAO College was open to all communities, and had a sizeable number of Hindu students. The first graduate of the college was a Hindu. The curriculum at the college involved scientific and Western subjects, as well as Oriental subjects and religious education. The first chancellor was Sultan Shah Jahan Begum, a prominent Muslim noblewoman, and Sir Syed invited an Englishman, Theodore Beck, to serve as the first college principal. The college was originally affiliated with Calcutta University but was transferred to the Allahabad University in 1885. Near the turn of the 20th century, it began publishing its own magazine and established a law school. In 1920, the college was transformed into Aligarh Muslim University.

=== Muhammadan Educational Conference ===
After founding the Anglo-Oriental College, Sir Syed felt the need of a pan-India organisation to propagate the ideas of his movement. To this cause, he established the All India Muhammadan Educational Congress with its headquarters in Aligarh. The first session of the Congress was held at Aligarh in 1886 under the presidency of Maulvi Samiullah Khan. The main objective of the organisation was to promote educational development among Muslims through conferences throughout India and transform the Anglo-Oriental College to the status of university. The name of the organisation was changed to All India Muhammadan Educational Conference to avoid confusion with the Indian National Congress.

=== Opposition and criticism ===
Sir Syed's Aligarh Movement and his desire to open institutions for Western education was opposed by the orthodox Indian Muslims. Imdad Ali, the then deputy collector of Kanpur condemned the foundation of Anglo-Oriental College. Several periodicals such as Noor-ul-Afaq, Noor-ul-Anwar, and Taed-ul-Islam were started by his opponents in opposition to Tehzeeb-ul-Akhlaq to dissuade Muslims from joining the Aligarh Movement. Many other orthodox Islamic schools condemned him as out of the fold of Islam (i.e. a kafir). According to J.M.S. Baljon his ideas created "a real hurricane of protests and outbursts of wrath" among the local clerics "in every town and village" in Muslim India, who issued fatawa "declaring him to be a kafir" (unbeliever). He was also accused of having converted to Christianity. Mirza Ghulam Ahmad, the founder of the Ahmadiyya movement criticised some of his writings in a polemic titled Barakat al Dua. Jamal al-Din al-Afghani, the Pan-Islamic ideologue, launched a vitriolic attack on him through his periodical calling him a “Naturist”.

Many of his own friends, like Nawab Muhsin-ul-Mulk, expressed their significant reservations at his religious ideas (many of which were expounded in his commentary of Qur'an). Syed Ahmad Khan's controversial views such as his rejection of miracles, denial of the existence of angels, downplaying the status of prophethood, etc. arose disdain also from orthodox adherents of Waliullahi reform trends, such as Ahl-e Hadith and Deobandis. Ahl-i Hadith were particularly severe in their condemnation of Ahmad Khan; with many of its leaders like Muḥammad Ḥusayn Baṭālvī (d. 1920 C.E/ 1338 A.H) declaring Takfir (excommunication) of Sir Syed as an apostate.

Maulana Qasim Nanautawi, the founder of Darul Uloom Deoband, expressed in a letter to an acquaintance of his and Sir Syed's:

"No doubt, I greatly admire, as per what I've heard, Syed (Ahmad) Sahab's courage (Ūlul Azmi) and concern for the Muslims (Dardmandi e Ahl e Islam). For this if I shall express my affection for him, it will be rightful. However, similar to this (or rather more than this), upon hearing about his disturbed (Fāsid) beliefs, I have deep complaints and sorrow for him"

Maulana Qasim Nanautawi wrote directly to Sir Syed as well, explaining him some of his "noteworthy" mistakes. This correspondence was published as "Tasfiyat ul Aqaaid" in 1887 C.E

== Political thoughts and activities ==
Shan Muhammad in his book Sir Syed Ahmad Khan: a political biography notes that Sir Syed was foremost an educationist and reformer and not an academic thinker, and so his political philosophy is related to the circumstances of his times. Important events that shaped his political outlook includes the 1857 Rebellion, the premiership of William Ewart Gladstone in England (which started in 1868) and the viceroyalty of Ripon in India.

Sir Syed was deeply religious. His political views were centered on Islam and an Islamic viewpoint.

In 1878, Sir Syed was nominated to the Viceroy's Legislative Council. He testified before the education commission to promote the establishment of more colleges and schools across India. At the start of his political career, Sir Syed was an advocate of Hindu–Muslim unity and India's composite culture, wanting to empower all Indians. In the same year, Sir Syed founded the Muhammadan Association to promote political co-operation amongst Indian Muslims from different parts of the country. In 1886, he organised the All India Muhammadan Educational Conference in Aligarh, which promoted his vision of modern education and political unity for Muslims. His works made him the most prominent Muslim politician in 19th century India, often influencing the attitude of Muslims on various national issues.

=== Opposition to active politics ===
Sir Syed discouraged the active involvement of Muslims in politics. He regarded the attainment of higher English education, not political pursuits, as the first priority for the upliftmeant of the Muslim community. He declined to lend support to the National Muhammadan Association, a political organisation founded by Syed Ameer Ali in 1887 and refused to participate in the Muhammedan National Conference at Lahore which he regarded as a political agitation.

When the Indian National Congress was established in 1885 he did not express any opinion about it but later he became an active critic of the organisation and expressed his active opposition to the Congress.

Sir Syed's opposition received criticism from Maulvi Sharaf-ul-Haqq who criticised his views about the Congress demands in a risala titled Kalam Mufid-al-Anam. Lala Lajpat Rai wrote a series of open letters expressing grief and surprise at his change in attitude towards Congress.

Sir Syed advocated the use of constitutional machinery, such as participation in administration, for expressing grievances to the British government. He supported the efforts of Indian political leaders Surendranath Banerjee and Dadabhai Naoroji to obtain representation for Indians in the government and civil services. In 1883, he founded the Muhammadan Civil Service Fund Association to encourage and support the entry of Muslim graduates into the Indian Civil Service (ICS). In 1883, he established the Muhammedan Association to put forward grievances of the Muslims to the Imperial Legislative Council. He was nominated as a member of the Civil Service Commission in 1887 by Lord Dufferin. In 1888, he along with Raja Shiv Prasad of Benaras established the United Patriotic Association at Aligarh to promote political co-operation with the British and Muslim participation in the British government.

=== Hindu–Muslim unity ===
Syed Ahmad Khan advocated for Hindu–Muslim unity in Colonial India. He stated: "India is a beautiful bride and Hindus and Muslims are her two eyes. If one of them is lost, this beautiful bride will become ugly." Being raised in the diverse city of Delhi, Syed Ahmad Khan was exposed to the festivals of both Hindus and Muslims. He collected Hindu scriptures and "had a commitment to the country's composite culture", being close friends with Swami Vivekanand to Debendranath Tagore. In the 19th century, he opposed cow slaughter, even stopping a fellow Muslim from sacrificing one for Eid al-Adha to promote peace between Muslims and Hindus. Addressing a large gathering in Gurdaspur on 27 January 1884, Sir Syed said:

O Hindus and Muslims! Do you belong to a country other than India? Don't you live on the soil and are you not buried under it or cremated on its ghats? If you live and die on this land, then bear in mind that ‘Hindu’ and ‘Muslim’ is but religious word: all the Hindus, Muslims and Christians who live in this country are one nation.

When he founded Muhammadan Anglo-Oriental College, he opened its admissions to Indians of all faiths, with its first principal Henry Siddons being a Christian and one of its patrons Mahendra Singh of Patiala being a Sikh. Shafey Kidwai notes that Sir Syed promoted "advocacy of the empowerment of all Indians".

In his book Causes of the Indian Revolt, which was originally published in Urdu in 1858, he referred to Hindus and Muslims as 'two antagonistic races' when highlighting the British folly of bringing them together in a single unit, thereby endangering the British position.

=== Advocacy of Urdu ===
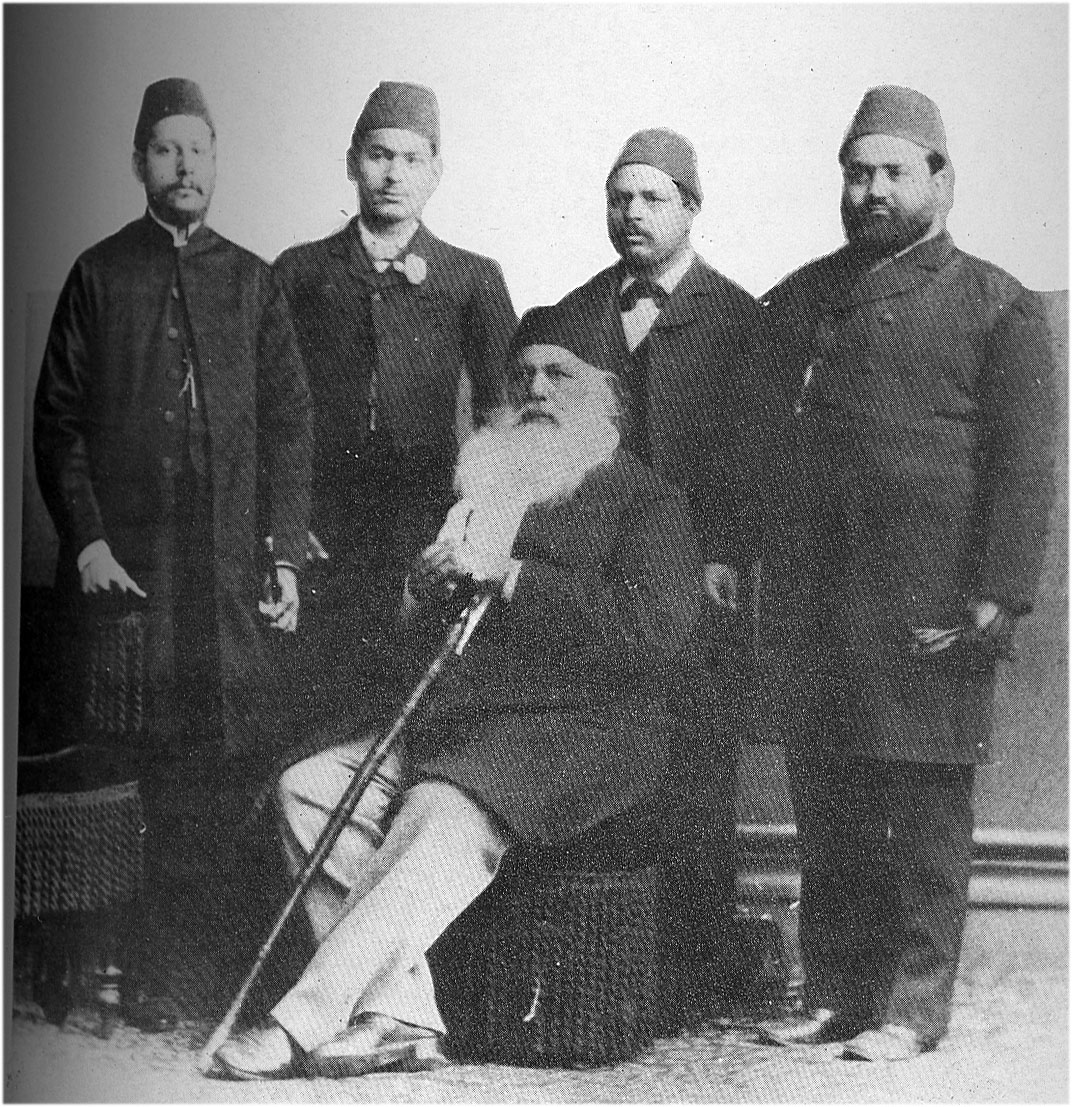
Sir Syed Ahmad Khan in Punjab

The onset of the Hindi–Urdu controversy of 1867 saw the emergence of Sir Syed as a champion for the cause of the Urdu language. He became a leading Muslim voice opposing the adoption of Hindi as a second official language of the United Provinces (now Uttar Pradesh). Sir Syed perceived Urdu as the lingua franca of the United Provinces which was created as a confluence of Muslim and Hindu contributions in India. Having been developed during the Mughal period, Urdu was used as a secondary language to Persian, the official language of the Mughal court. Since the decline of the Mughal dynasty, Sir Syed promoted the use of Urdu through his own writings. Under Sir Syed, the Scientific Society translated Western works only into Urdu. The schools established by Sir Syed imparted education in the Urdu medium. The demand for Hindi, led largely by Hindus, was to Sir Syed an erosion of the centuries-old Muslim cultural domination of India. Testifying before the British-appointed education commission, Sir Syed controversially exclaimed that "Urdu was the language of gentry and Hindi that of the vulgar." His remarks provoked a hostile response from Hindu leaders, who unified across the nation to demand the recognition of Hindi.

The success of the Hindi movement led Sir Syed to further advocate Urdu as the symbol of Muslim heritage and as the language of all Indian Muslims. His educational and political work grew increasingly centred around and exclusively for Muslim interests. He also sought to persuade the British to give Urdu extensive official use and patronage. His colleagues such as Mohsin-ul-Mulk and Maulvi Abdul Haq developed organisations such as the Urdu Defence Association and the Anjuman Taraqqi-i-Urdu, committed to the perpetuation of Urdu. All these colleagues led efforts that resulted in the adoption of Urdu as the official language of the Hyderabad State and as the medium of instruction in the Osmania University. To Muslims in northern and western India, Urdu had become an integral part of political and cultural identity. However, the division over the use of Hindi or Urdu further provoked communal conflict between Muslims and Hindus in India.

=== Two-nation theory ===
Sir Syed is considered as the first person to theorise the idea of separate nationhood for Muslims in subcontinent. In a speech at Meerut in 1888 he presented on overall scenario of post colonial phase in which he described Muslims and Hindus as two nations. He's regarded as the father of two-nation theory and the pioneer of Muslim nationalism which led to the partition of India.

Urdu-Hindi controversy is seen as the transformation of Sir Syed's views towards Muslim nationhood which he expressed in his speeches during later days. While fearful of the loss of Muslim political power owing to the community's backwardness, Sir Syed was also averse to the prospect of democratic self-government, which would give control of government to the Hindu-majority population.

"At this time our nation is in a bad state in regards education and wealth, but God has given us the light of religion and the Quran is present for our guidance, which has ordained them and us to be friends. Now God has made them rulers over us. Therefore we should cultivate friendship with them, and should adopt that method by which their rule may remain permanent and firm in India, and may not pass into the hands of the Bengalis... If we join the political movement of the Bengalis our nation will reap a loss, for we do not want to become subjects of the Hindus instead of the subjects of the "people of the Book..."

Later in his life he said:

"Suppose that the English community and the army were to leave India, taking with them all their cannons and their splendid weapons and all else, who then would be the rulers of India?... Is it possible that under these circumstances two nations — the Mohammedans and the Hindus — could sit on the same throne and remain equal in power? Most certainly not. It is necessary that one of them should conquer the other. To hope that both could remain equal is to desire the impossible and the inconceivable. But until one nation has conquered the other and made it obedient, peace cannot reign in the land."

== Personal life ==
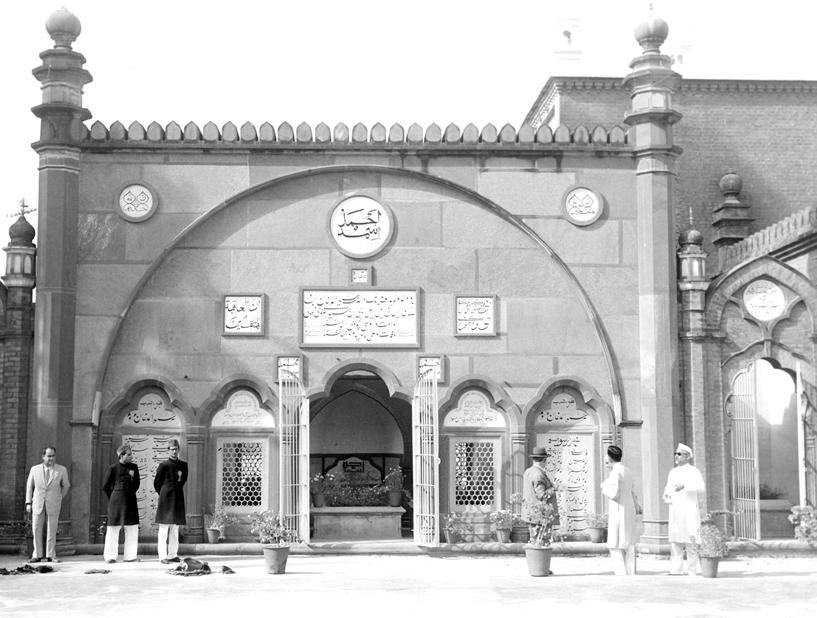
Tomb of Syed Ahmad Khan

In 1836, he married Parsa Begum, alias Mubarak Begum. They had two sons, Syed Hamid and Syed Mahmood, and a daughter, Ameena, who died at a young age.

Sir Syed Ahmad Khan lived the last two decades of his life in Aligarh, regarded widely as the mentor of 19th and 20th century Muslim entrepreneurs. Battling illnesses and old age, Sir Syed died on 27 March 1898. He was buried adjacent to the Sir Syed Masjid in the grounds of the Aligarh Muslim University.

== Legacy and influence ==
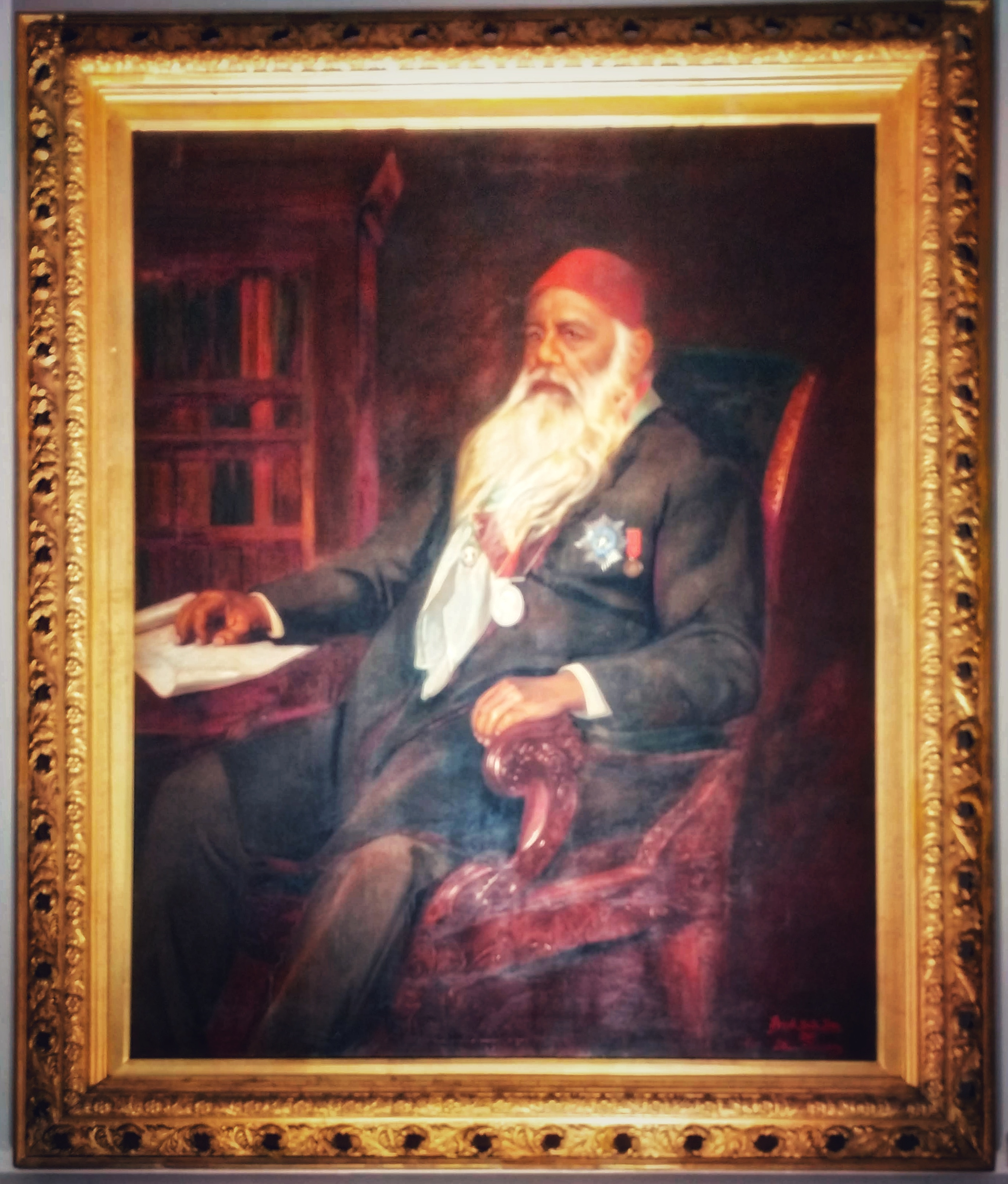
A painting of Syed Ahmad Khan

Syed Ahmad is widely commemorated across South Asia as a great Muslim social reformer and visionary. His educational model and progressive thinking inspired Muslim elites who supported the All India Muslim League. He founded the All India Muhammadan Educational Conference in 1886 in order to promote Western education, especially science and literature, among India's Muslims. The conference, in addition to generating funds for Ahmad Khan's Muhammadan Anglo-Oriental College, motivated Muslim elites to propose expansion of educational uplift elsewhere, known as the Aligarh Movement. In turn, this new awareness of Muslim needs helped stimulate a political consciousness among Muslim elites, who went on to form the AIML, which led Muslims of India towards the formation of Pakistan.

He was an influence on several political leaders, thinkers and writers such as Muhammad Iqbal, Abul Kalam Azad, Sayyid Mumtaz Ali Altaf Hussain Hali, Shibli Nomani, Nawab Mohsin-ul-Mulk, Chiragh Ali, and Nazir Ahmad Dehlvi.

The university he founded remains one of India's most prominent institutions and served as the arsenal of Muslim India. Prominent alumni of Aligarh include Muslim political leaders Maulana Mohammad Ali Jouhar, Abdur Rab Nishtar, Maulana Shaukat Ali and Maulvi Abdul Haq. The first two Prime Ministers of Pakistan, Liaquat Ali Khan and Khawaja Nazimuddin, as well as Indian President Dr. Zakir Husain, are amongst Aligarh's most famous graduates. His birth anniversary is celebrated as Sir Syed Day every year by the university and its alumni.

Several educational institutions in India and Pakistan such as Sir Syed University of Engineering and Technology, Sir Syed CASE Institute of Technology and Sir Syed College, Taliparamba are named after him.

== Honours ==
On 2 June 1869, Syed Ahmad Khan was appointed a Companion of the Order of the Star of India (CSI), for his service as Principal Sadr Amin. He was appointed a fellow of the Calcutta and Allahabad Universities by the Viceroy in the years 1876 and 1887 respectively.

Syed Ahmad was later bestowed with the suffix of 'Khan Bahadur' and was subsequently knighted by the British government in the 1888 New Year Honours as a Knight Commander of the Order of the Star of India (KCSI). for his loyalty to the British crown, through his membership of the Imperial Legislative Council and in the following year he received an LL.D. honoris causa from the Edinburgh University.

India Post issued commemorative postage stamps in his honour in 1973 and 1998.

Pakistan Postal Services also issued a commemorative postage stamp in his honour in 1990 in its 'Pioneers of Freedom' series.

In 1997, Syed Ahmad Khan was commemorated with an English Heritage blue plaque at 21 Mecklenburgh Square in Bloomsbury, where he lived in 1869–70.

On 2017, commemorative Rs. 50 coin featuring Sir Syed Ahmad Khan was issued by State Bank of Pakistan on his 200th birth anniversary.

On 14 August 2022, marking the diamond jubilee celebrations of Pakistan's independence, State Bank of Pakistan issued a commemorative Rs.75 note featuring Syed Ahmed Khan along with other founding fathers signifying their struggle for country's independence.

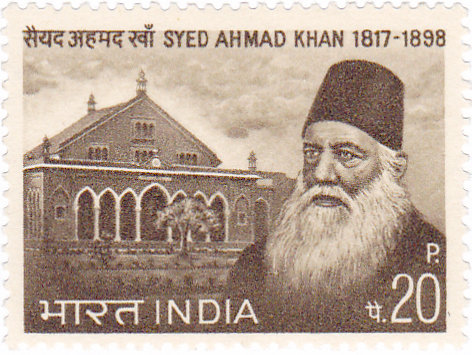
1973 Indian stamp

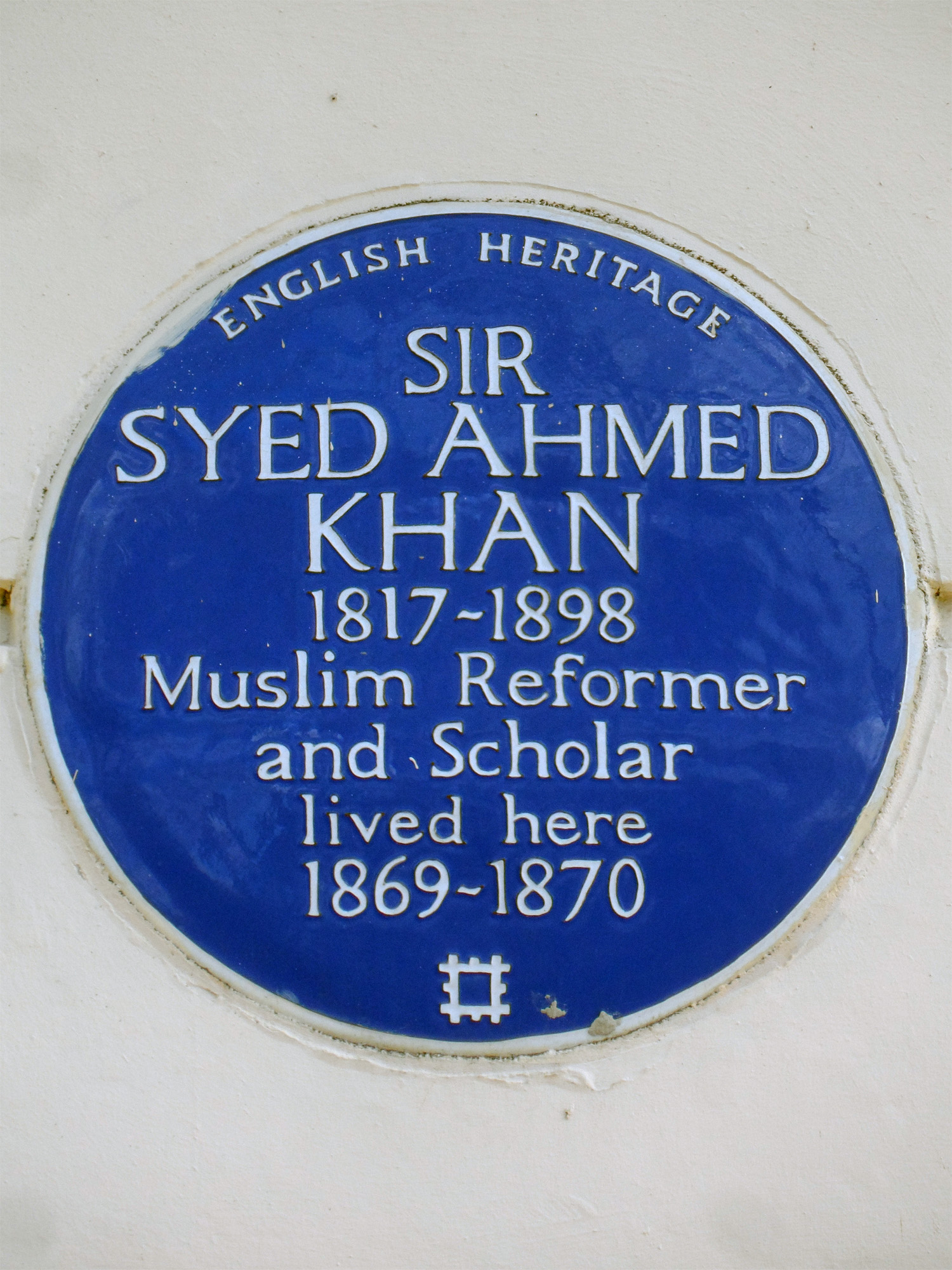
English Heritage blue plaque dedicated to Sir Syed

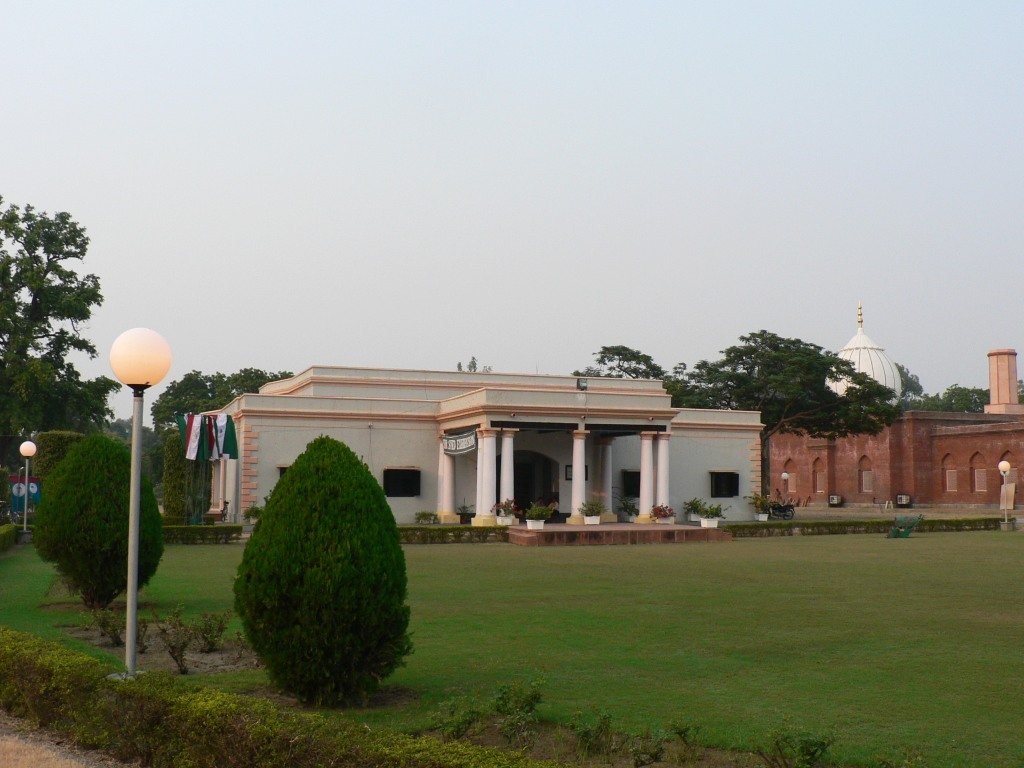
Sir Syed's house in the university campus

== In popular culture ==
Sir Syed Ahmad Khan: The Messiah an Indian Urdu-language biographical film based on the life of Khan was released in 2024 and streamed on Apple TV.

== Bibliography ==
=== Legal works ===
- Act No. 10 (Stamp Act) 1862.
- Act No. 14 (Limitation Act )1859–1864.
- Act No. 16 (Regarding registration documents) – Allyson, 1864.
- Act No. 18 (Regarding women's rights) 1866.

=== Religious works ===
- Jila al- Qulub bi Zikr al-Mahbub (Delight of the Hearts in Remembering the Beloved), Delhi, 1843.
- Tuhfa-i Hasan (The Gift to Hasan), 1844.
- Tarjama Fawa'id al-Afkar fi Amal al-Farjar, Delhi 1846.
- Mazumm ba Nisbat Tanazzul Ulum-i-Diniya wa Arabiya wa Falsafa-i-Yunaniya, Agra, 1857.
- Risala Tahqiq Lafzi-i-Nassara, 1860.
- Ahkam Tu'am Ahl-Kitab, Kanpur, 1868.
- Risala ho wal Mojud, 1880.
- Kimiya-i-Sa'dat, 2 fasl, 1883.
- Namiqa fi Bayan Mas'ala Tasawwur al-Shaikh, Aligarh, 1883.
- Rah-i-Sunnat Dar Rad-i-Bid'at, Aligarh, 1883.
- Tarqim fi Qisa Ashab al-Kahf wal-Raqim, Agra, 1889.
- Izalat ul-Chain as Zi'al Qarnain, Agra, 1889.
- Khulq al-Insan ala ma fi al-Quran, Agra, 1892.
- Al-Du'a Wa'l Istajaba, Agra, 1892.
- Tahrir fi Usul al-Tafsir, Agra, 1892.
- Al-Nazar Fi Ba'z Masa'il Imam Al-Ghazzali, Agra.
- Risala Ibtal-i-Ghulami, Agra, 1893.
- Tafsir al-Jinn Wa'l Jan ala ma fi al-Qur'an, Rahmani Press, Lahore, 1893, Agra, 1891.
- Tabyin-ul-Kalam fi Tafsir-al-Turat-wa'l Injil ala Mullat-al-Islam (The Commentary on the Holy Bible).
- Tafsir-ul-Qur'an.

Vol. I Aligarh, 1880,
Vol. II Aligarh, 1882, Agra, 1903.
Vol. III Aligarh, 1885
Vol. IV Aligarh, 1888
Vol. V Aligarh, 1892.
Vol. VI Aligarh, 1895
Vol. VII Agra, 1904.

- Tafsir-a-Samawat, Agra.
- Tasfiyad al'Aquid (Being the correspondence between Syed Ahmad Khan and Maulana Muhammad Qasim of Deoband).

=== Historical works ===
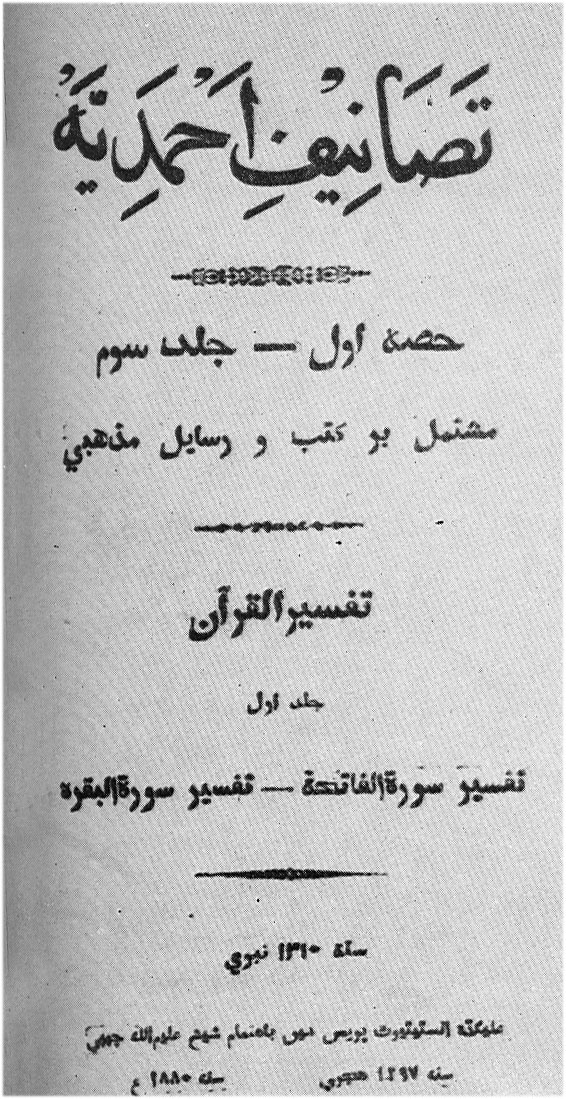
Title page of Commentary of Quran by Sir Syed Ahmed Khan

- A'in-e-Akbari (Edition with Illustration), Delhi.
- Asrar-us-Sanadid (i) Syed-ul-Akhbar, 1847, (II) Mata-i-Sultani, 1852.
- Description des monument de Delhi in 1852, D'a Pre Le Texte Hindostani De Saiyid Ahmad Khan (tr. by M. Garcin De Tassy), Paris, 1861.
- Jam-i-Jum, Akbarabad, 1940.
- Silsilat-ul-Muluk, Musaraf ul Mataba', Delhi, 1852.
- Tarikh-i-Firoz Shahi (Edition), Asiatic Society, Calcutta, 1862.
- Tuzuk-i-Jahangiri (edition Aligarh, 1864).

=== Biographical works ===
- Al-Khutbat al-Ahmadiya fi'l Arab wa'I Sirat al-Muhammadiya : Aligarh, 1900, English translation, London, 1869–70.
- Sirat-i-Faridiya, Agra, 1896.

=== Political works ===
- Asbab-i-Baghawat-e-Hind, Urdu 1858 and English edition, Banaras.
- Lecture Indian National Congress Madras Par, Kanpur, 1887.
- Lectures on the Act XVI of 1864, delivered on 4 December 1864 for the Scientific Society, Allygurh, 1864.
- Musalmanon ki qismat ka faisla (Taqarir-e-Syed Ahmad Khan wa Syed Mehdi Ali Khan etc.) Agra, 1894.
- On Hunter's: Our Indian Mussulmans' London, 1872.
- Present State of Indian Politics (Consisting of lectures and speeches) Allahabad, 1888.
- Sarkashi Zilla Binjor, Agra 1858.

=== Lectures ===
- Iltimas be Khidmat Sakinan-i-Hindustan dar bad tarraqi ta' lim ahl-i.Hind, Ghazipore, 1863.
- Lecture dar bab targhib wa tahris talim itfal-i-Musalmanan, in 1895, Agra 1896.
- Lecture Madrasaat ul-Ulum Aligarh Key Tarikhi halat Par, Agra. 1889.
- Lecture Ijlas Dahum Muhammadan Educational Conference, Agra, 1896.
- Lecture Muta'liq Ijlas Yazdahum Muhammadan Educational Conference, Agra, 1896.
- Majmu'a Resolution Haye dah sala (Resolutions passed by the Muhammadan Anglo-Oriental Educational Conference from 1886 to 1895) ed. by Sir Syed Ahmad, Agra, 1896.
- Report Salana (Annual Report of the Boarding House of Madrasat-ul-Ulum 1879–1880).
- Khutbat-e-Ahmadia in the reply to "The Life of Mohamed" by William Muir, was penned in 1870.

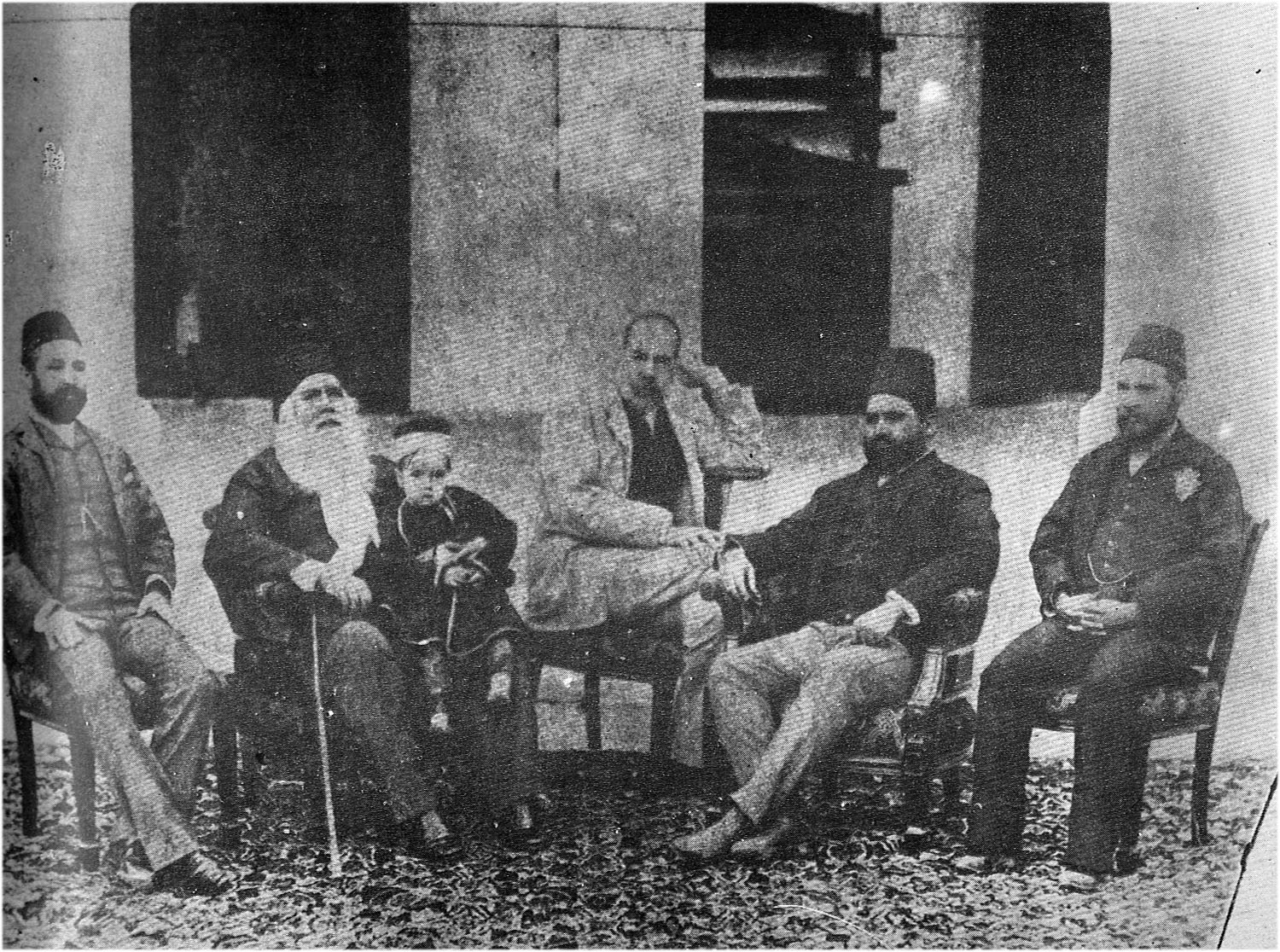
Sir Syed with his son Syed Mahmood, grandson Syed Ross Masood, and some admirers.

=== Collected works ===
- Khutut-i-Sir Syed, ed Ross Masud, 1924.
- Majuma Lecture Kaye Sir Syed ed. Munshi Sirajuddin, Sadhora 1892.
- Maqalat-i-Sir-Syed ed. by 'Abdullah Khvesgri, Aligarh, 1952.
- Maqalat-i-Sir Syed, ed. By Muhammad Ismail, Lahore,
- Makatib-i-Sir Syed, Mustaq Husain, Delhi, 1960.
- Maktubat-i-Sir Syed, Muhammad Ismail Panipati, Lahore, 1959.
- Makummal Majumua Lectures wa speeches. ed. Malik Fazaluddin, Lahore, 1900.
- Muktubat al-Khullan ed. Mohd. Usman Maqbul, Aligarh 1915.
- Tasanif-i-Ahmadiya (Collection of Syed Ahmad Khan's works on religions topics) in 8 parts.
- Stress on Holy Quran.
- Reformation of Faith.

=== Miscellaneous ===
- On the Use of the Sector (Urdu), Syed-ul-Akbar, 1846.
- Qaul-i-Matin dar Ibtal-i-Harkat i Zamin, Delhi, 1848.
- Tashil fi Jar-a-Saqil, Agra, 1844.
- Ik Nadan Khuda Parast aur Dana dunyadar Ki Kahani, Badaon, 1910.
- Kalamat-ul-Haqq, Aligarh

=== Journals, reports, and proceedings ===
- Tehzeeb-ul-Ikhlaq.
- Aligarh Institute Gazette.
- Proceedings of the Muhammadens Educational Conference.
- An Account of the Loyal Muhammadans of India, Parts I, II, III, Moufussel Press, Meerut, 1860.
- Proceedings of the Scientific Society.
- By-Laws of the Scientific Society.
- Addresses and speeches relating to the Muhammadan Anglo-Oriental College in Aligarh (1875–1898) ed. Nawab Mohsin-ul-Mulk, Aligarh, 1898.

== See also ==
- Aligarh Muslim University
  - Sir Syed Masjid
- Aligarh Movement
- All India Muhammadan Educational Conference
- Two-nation theory
- Muslim nationalism in South Asia
- All India Muslim League
- Islamic Modernism

== Cited sources ==
- Graham, George Farquhar (1885). The Life and Work of Syed Ahmed Khan. Black wood.
- Hali, Altaf Husain (1994) [1901]. Hayat-i-Javed (A Biography of Sir Sayyid). New Delhi: Rupa and Company. ISBN 978-9693501865.
- Abdullah, S. M. (1940). The spirit and substance of Urdu prose under the influence of Sir Sayyid Ahamad Khan. Sh. Muhammad Ashraf, Lahore.
- Sherwani, H. K. (1944). "The Political Thought Of Sir Syed Ahmad Khan". The Indian Journal of Political Science. 5 (4): 306–328. ISSN 0019-5510. JSTOR 42754317.
- Ahmad, Aziz (1960). "Sayyid Aḥmad Khān, Jamāl al-dīn al-Afghānī and Muslim India". Studia Islamica (13): 55–78. doi:10.2307/1595240. ISSN 0585-5292. JSTOR 1595240.
- Baljon, J.M.S. (1964). The Reforms and Religious Ideas of Sir Sayyid Ahmad Khan. Lahore: S.M. Ashraf.
- Nizami, Khaliq Ahmad (1966). Sayyid Ahmad Khan. Public Resource. Publications Division, Ministry of Information and Broadcasting, Govt. of India. ISBN 978-8123025131.
- Shan Muhammad (1969). Sir Syed Ahmad Khan; a political biography. Internet Archive. Meerut, Meenaksi Parkashan.
- Troll, Christian W. (1972). "A Note on an Early Topographical Work of Sayyid Aḥmad Khān: "Ās̤ār al-Ṣanādīd"". Journal of the Royal Asiatic Society of Great Britain and Ireland. 104 (2): 135–146. doi:10.1017/S0035869X00157508. ISSN 0035-869X. JSTOR 25203370. S2CID 163133936.
- K̲h̲ān̲, Sir Sayyid Aḥmad; Muhammad, Shan (1973). Writings and Speeches of Sir Syed Ahmad Rhan. Nachiketa Publications.
- Troll, Christian W. (1978). Sayyid Ahmad Khan: A Reinterpretation of Muslim Theology. Vikas Publishing House. ISBN 978-0-7069-0626-4.
- Ali, M. Mohar (1980). "Hunter's "Indian Musalmans": A Re-Examination of Its Background". Journal of the Royal Asiatic Society of Great Britain and Ireland. 112 (1): 30–51. doi:10.1017/S0035869X00135889. ISSN 0035-869X. JSTOR 25211084. S2CID 154830629.
- Panipati, Muhammad Ismail (1995). Khutoot banaam Sir Syed. Lahore, Pakistan: Majlis Taraqqi e Adab Lahore.
- Guenther, Alan M. (2002). "Response Of Sayyid Ahmad Khan To Sir William Muir's Evaluation Of Hadit Literature". Oriente Moderno. 21 (82) (1): 219–254. doi:10.1163/22138617-08201015. ISSN 0030-5472. JSTOR 25817822.
- K̲h̲ān̲, Sir Sayyid Aḥmad; Wilder, John W. (2006). Selected Essays by Sir Sayyid Ahmad Khan. Sang-e Meel Publications. ISBN 978-969-35-1805-4.
- Guha, Ramachandra (2010). Makers of Modern India. Penguin Books India. ISBN 978-0-670-08385-5.
- Naim, C. M. (2011). "Syed Ahmad and His Two Books Called 'Asar-al-Sanadid'". Modern Asian Studies. 45 (3): 669–708. doi:10.1017/S0026749X10000156. ISSN 0026-749X. JSTOR 25835695. S2CID 145216086.
- Fuerst, Ilyse R. Morgenstein (14 August 2017). Indian Muslim Minorities and the 1857 Rebellion: Religion, Rebels and Jihad. Bloomsbury Publishing. ISBN 978-1-78673-237-8.
- Kidwai, Shafey (3 December 2020). Sir Syed Ahmad Khan: Reason, Religion and Nation. Taylor & Francis. ISBN 978-1-000-29773-7.
- Alam, Muzaffar (1 August 2021). The Mughals and the Sufis: Islam and Political Imagination in India, 1500–1750. SUNY Press. ISBN 978-1-4384-8490-7.
- Engineer, Asghar Ali (2001). Rational Approach to Islam. Gyan Publishing House. ISBN 978-81-212-0725-6.
- Nyrop, Richard F. (1975). Area Handbook for Pakistan. U.S. Government Printing Office.
- Rashid Khan, Abdul (2007). "All India Muhammadan Educational Conference and the Foundation of the All India Muslim League". Journal of the Pakistan Historical Society. 55 (1–2): 65–83.
- Kidwai, Shafey (2010). Cementing Ethics with Modernism: An Appraisal of Sir Sayyed Ahmed Khan's Writings. Gyan Publishing House. ISBN 978-81-212-1047-8.
- Malik, Hafeez (1980). Sir Sayyid Ahmad Khan and Muslim modernization in India and Pakistan. Internet Archive. New York : Columbia University Press. ISBN 978-0-231-04970-2.
- Hasan, Tariq (2006). The Aligarh Movement and the Making of the Indian Muslim Mind, 1857-2002. Rupa & Company. ISBN 978-81-291-0847-0.
