= Aligarh Institute Gazette =

AMU Gazette
- Language: Urdu, English
- Edited by: Syed Ahmed Khan

Publication details
- Former names: Aligarh Institute Gazette; Aligarh Institute Gazette of the Mohammadan Anglo-Oriental College; Muslim University Gazette; Aligarh Muslim University Gazette
- History: 1866–present
- Publisher: Syed Ahmed Khan (India)
- Frequency: Biweekly

Standard abbreviations
- ISO 4: AMU Gaz.

The Aligarh Institute Gazette (Urdu: اخبار سائنٹیفک سوسائٹی) was the first multilingual journal of India, introduced, edited, and published in 1866 by Sir Syed Ahmed Khan which was read widely across the country. Theodore Beck later became its editor. In 1921, it was renamed the Muslim University Gazette, then later Aligarh Muslim University Gazette and AMU Gazette.

== History ==
In 1864, a building named the Aligarh Institute was erected for the Scientific Society of Aligarh, which launched its journal Aligarh Institute Gazette in the same year. A joint mouthpiece of the Scientific Society and the Institute the journal came into weekly circulation from 30 March 1866 with the slogan "To permit the liberty of the Press is the part of a wise Government; to preserve it is the part of a free people." Part of the Gazette's contents were printed in Urdu alone, part in English, and a portion also in both languages. The editorial team was composed of Sir Syed Ahmad Khan as Honorary Editor, Munshi Mohammad Yaar Khan as Editor, Munshi Chaukhan Lal as translator, Babu Durga Prashad as translator and Shaikh Fida Ali as Librarian and distribution incharge. The Aligarh Institute Gazette had a circulation of four hundred but played a key role in mobilizing the people and convey the message of the Society.

In 1871 William Wilson Hunter, a British civil servant in Bengal, published his famous book The Indian Mussalmans, in which he raised questions about the loyalty of the Muslims to the British government and referred to the earlier military campaigns of Sayyid Ahmad Barelvi to establish Muslim rule. Sir Syed's reaction to this book is described as follows:

"Sir Syed Ahmad Khan took Hunter's book very seriously, and vehemently criticized its contents by publishing a review on it. In the review he tried to argue that the jihad movement of Sayyid Ahmad [Barelvi] and his followers was directed solely against the Sikh rule in the Punjab and that it had nothing to do with the British government in India. He adopted an apologetic tone to convince the British authorities that the Indian Muslims, including the followers of Sayyid Ahmad [Barelvi], were not opposed to the British rule. 'The articles of Sir Syed Ahmad Khan, which were published in The Pioneer and in the Aligarh Institute Gazette, refuted William Hunter's ideas alleging that there was a widespread conspiracy among the Indian Muslims. He tried to convince the English readers and the British authorities that the accounts of William Hunter about the followers of Sayyid Ahmad and their jihad movement were not based on facts.'

By 1876 the paper was jubilantly reporting the changing spirit of times.

Old archives (till 1944) of the Gazette can be found at Nehru Memorial Museum & Library.

== See also ==
- Tehzeeb-ul-Akhlaq
- Aligarh Muslim University
