= Muhammadan Anglo-Oriental College =

Oriental College in Uttar Pradesh

Muhammadan Anglo-Oriental College (Urdu: مدرست العلوم مسلمانانِ ہند, romanized: Madrasat ul-ʿUlūm Musalmānān-e-Hind, lit. "Science School for the Muslims of India") was founded in 1875 by Sir Syed Ahmad Khan, initially as a primary school, with the intention of turning it to a college level institution. It was inspired by the Cambridge education system. It started operations on Queen Victoria's 56th birthday, 24 May 1875.

== History ==
It was established as Madrasatul Uloom Musalmanan-e-Hind in 1875, and after two years it became Muhammadan Anglo-Oriental College. The statesman Syed Ahmad Khan founded the predecessor of Aligarh Muslim University, the Muhammadan Anglo Oriental College, in 1875 having already established two schools. These were part of the movement of Muslim awakening associated with Syed Ahmad Khan which came to be known as Aligarh Movement. He considered competence in English and "Western sciences" necessary skills for maintaining Muslims' political influence, especially in Northern India. Khan's image for the college was based on his visit to Oxford and Cambridge and he wanted to establish an education system similar to the British model.

Sir Syed nursed the institution at a time when English education was a taboo. Intermediate classes were started in 1878, and in 1881 B.A. degree classes were added. In 1881, a civil service preparatory class was started for aspiring students. In 1887, it began to prepare students to enter Thomason College of Civil Engineering at Roorkee.

In the beginning, the college was affiliated with the University of Calcutta for the matriculation examination but became an affiliate of Allahabad University in 1885. In 1877, the school was raised to college level and Robert Bulwer-Lytton, 1st Earl of Lytton

The college also published a magazine by its name.

Sir Syed said that their intention was to establish a university. It was the predecessor of Aligarh Muslim University.

== Principals ==
The former Principals of the college were.

- Henry George Impey Siddons (1877–1884)
- Theodore Beck (1884–1899)
- Theodore Morison (1899–1905)
- William Archbold (1905–1909)
- J. H. Towle (1909–1919)
- Ziauddin Ahmad (1919–1920)
