= Zakir Ali Khan =

Pakistani writer (1926–2012)

- Born: 8 July 1926; Rampur, Uttar Pradesh, India
- Died: 8 February 2012 (aged 85); Karachi, Pakistan
- Resting place: Defence Phase-VII Graveyard
- Education: B.Sc
- Alma mater: Aligarh Muslim University
- Occupations: litterateur, civil engineer
- Known for: Founding member of Sir Syed University of Engineering and Technology, and AMU Old Boys Association
- Children: Nadir Ali Khan
- Awards: List

Muhammad Zakir Ali Khan (8 July 1926 – 8 February 2012) was a Pakistani litterateur and author. He served as a member of the Academic Council of the University of Karachi and the honorary vice chancellor of Sir Syed University of Engineering and Technology (SSUET) from 1993 to 2012. Khan is best known for co-founding the AMU Old Boys Association in Karachi in 1960 and SSUET's Board of Governors. He also served as the president of the Pakistan Association of Scientist and Scientific Professions (PASSP) and held memberships in the governing bodies of Karachi University and the Aligarh Institute of Technology.

== Early life and education ==
Khan was born on 8 July 1926 in Rampur, Uttar Pradesh in British India, into a family with ancestral ties to the Barech (Pathan) tribe of Afghanistan. He completed his matriculation in Rampur before attending Aligarh Muslim University, where he earned a B.Sc. degree in 1945, followed by a B.Sc. in engineering in 1948. During his time at AMU, he met prominent political figures of the era, such as Muhammad Ali Jinnah, Liaquat Ali Khan, Dr. Zakir Husain, Jawaharlal Nehru, Sir Shah Sulaiman and Sarojini Naidu, which influenced his later involvement in educational and social initiatives.

== Career ==
Khan began his career in Karachi, Pakistan, after the partition of British India in 1947. He initially served as the chief engineer for the Karachi Metropolitan Corporation, where he contributed to the city's urban development and infrastructure planning. His work in this role preceded his appointment as managing director of the Karachi Water and Sewerage Board (KWSB), where he oversaw projects focused on improving water distribution and sewerage systems. He also served as a member of academic council of the University of Karachi.

Khan was a founding member of several educational institutions, including the Sir Syed University of Engineering and Technology (SSUET), where he served as honorary vice chancellor and as a member of its Board of Governors. He also played a role in creating the Aligarh Institute of Technology in Karachi, serving on its governing body and supporting the development of technical education in Pakistan.

He also co-founded the AMU Old Boys Association in Karachi in 1960, a group dedicated to preserving and promoting the legacy of Aligarh Muslim University in Pakistan. Khan served as the honorary secretary of the association from its inception until his death, organizing events and initiatives that fostered educational and cultural ties between AMU alumni in Pakistan and India.

He also editor of Tehzeeb-ul-Akhlaq, an Urdu magazine founded by Sir Syed Ahmad Khan.

== Contributions to sports ==
Khan advocated for sports development in Pakistan, particularly tennis and hockey. He played a central role in the establishment of the KMC Sports Complex (KMC) and its central tennis court, which became a venue for tennis events in Pakistan. In 1980, the complex hosted an exhibition match between Ilie Nastase of Romania and Pakistani tennis player Saeed Meer, attended by professional tennis player Arthur Ashe. Khan served as the secretary of the Lawn Tennis Association, Karachi division, and managed several Pakistani sports teams abroad.

== Literary works ==
As a writer, Khan authored numerous books and articles on various topics, including culture, religion, and history. His works include Rawayat-e-Aligarh (Traditions of Aligarh), Hadees-e Haram (Hadith of Haram Mosque), and Yaadon ka Dastarkhwaan (The Spread of Memories). He also translated various works into Urdu, providing access to Urdu-speaking people in Pakistan.

== Awards ==
He was the recipient of numerous accolades and awards, including Sir Sayyad Lifetime Achievement Award by Aligarh Muslim University (AMU) in 2012 for his contributions to the Aligarh Movement and the higher education in Pakistan.

He was also awarded Sir Syed Ahmed Khan International Award for Literature from Aligarh Muslim University in 2008 in recognition of his contributions to literary works and promotion of the mission of Sir Syed. He was also awarded Dr. Sir Ziauddin Award, and Aligarh Alumni Association, New York's Alumni Award in 2000.
