= AMU Kishanganj Centre =

The Aligarh Muslim University Kishanganj Center (abbreviated as AMU Kishanganj) is a campus of Aligarh Muslim University, established in Kishanganj, Bihar, India. It was founded as part of a nationwide initiative for higher education among Muslim populations. It is one of the centers established after Aligarh Muslim University Malappuram Centre and Aligarh Muslim University: Murshidabad Centre.

== History ==
AMU Kishanganj Center was established in 2011, following recommendations by the Ministry of Human Resource Development to establish centers of AMU in Bihar.

The initial allotment of 224 acres of land for the center was made by the Bihar government in Chakla village, near Kishanganj town. The Government of India had approved 124 crores of funds to the center, but the funds are not allotted.

== Academic programs ==
The AMU Kishanganj Center initially started with a Bachelor of Education program in 2013. It is now expanded its offerings to other undergraduate and postgraduate programs in arts, sciences, and professional fields. Courses include a Bachelor of Education, law programs (integrated BA-LLB), diploma and certificate courses.

== Infrastructure ==
The campus is located in a rural area on land provided by the Bihar government. Despite challenges in construction and funding, the center has developed basic academic and residential facilities, including academic blocks, hostels for students, libraries and seminar halls. Efforts to enhance the infrastructure have been ongoing, with plans to expand the campus further.

== Future plans ==
The center plans to expand its academic offerings by adding three departments of research and study every year, according to the official webpage.
