= Ahmadi School for the Visually Challenged, Aligarh Muslim University =

School for the blind in India

Coordinates: 27.91°N 78.06°E

Ahmadi School for the Visually Challenged is a constituent school of the Aligarh Muslim University (AMU), Aligarh, India, dedicated to the education and rehabilitation of Visually Challenged students.

The School was founded by Late Sahebzada Aftab Ahmad Khan in 1927. The Aligarh Muslim University started giving financial assistance to the School in 1947 and finally took over its management in 1949. The School gradually developed into a leading institution for the Visually Challenged and is the only School of its kind being maintained by a Central University. The School was established with the aim of catering exclusively to Visually Challenged children, making it one the pioneering institution within AMU dedicated to inclusive education. Over the years, it has expanded its facilities to ensure holistic growth and development for its students.

Ahmadi School provides education from the primary level upwards, following a curriculum adapted to meet the needs of Visually Challenged learners. The School ensures accessibility through Braille Textbooks, audio learning materials and assistive technologies. The School is having various laboratories such as Science Lab, Computer Lab, Mathematics Lab, Language Lab, PHE Lab.

Science Laboratory adapted for hands-on learning experiences using models. Computer Laboratory equipped with screen reading software like JAWS and Braille Embosser to train students in digital literacy. Mathematics Laboratory designed with tactile models and learning aids to help students understand mathematical concepts. The School also offers Music Class both instrumental and vocal training, enabling students to explore artistic expression. The School have Recreational Room for small kids having various playing items, television etc. The School Library provides a large collection of Braille Books and accessible study resources.

Founded by Sahibzada Aftab Ahmad Khan specially for Visually Challenged Student. The school is mainly residential with facilities of free boarding and lodging.
