= Musa Dakri Museum =

Museum in India

Coordinates: 27°54′47″N 78°04′28″E

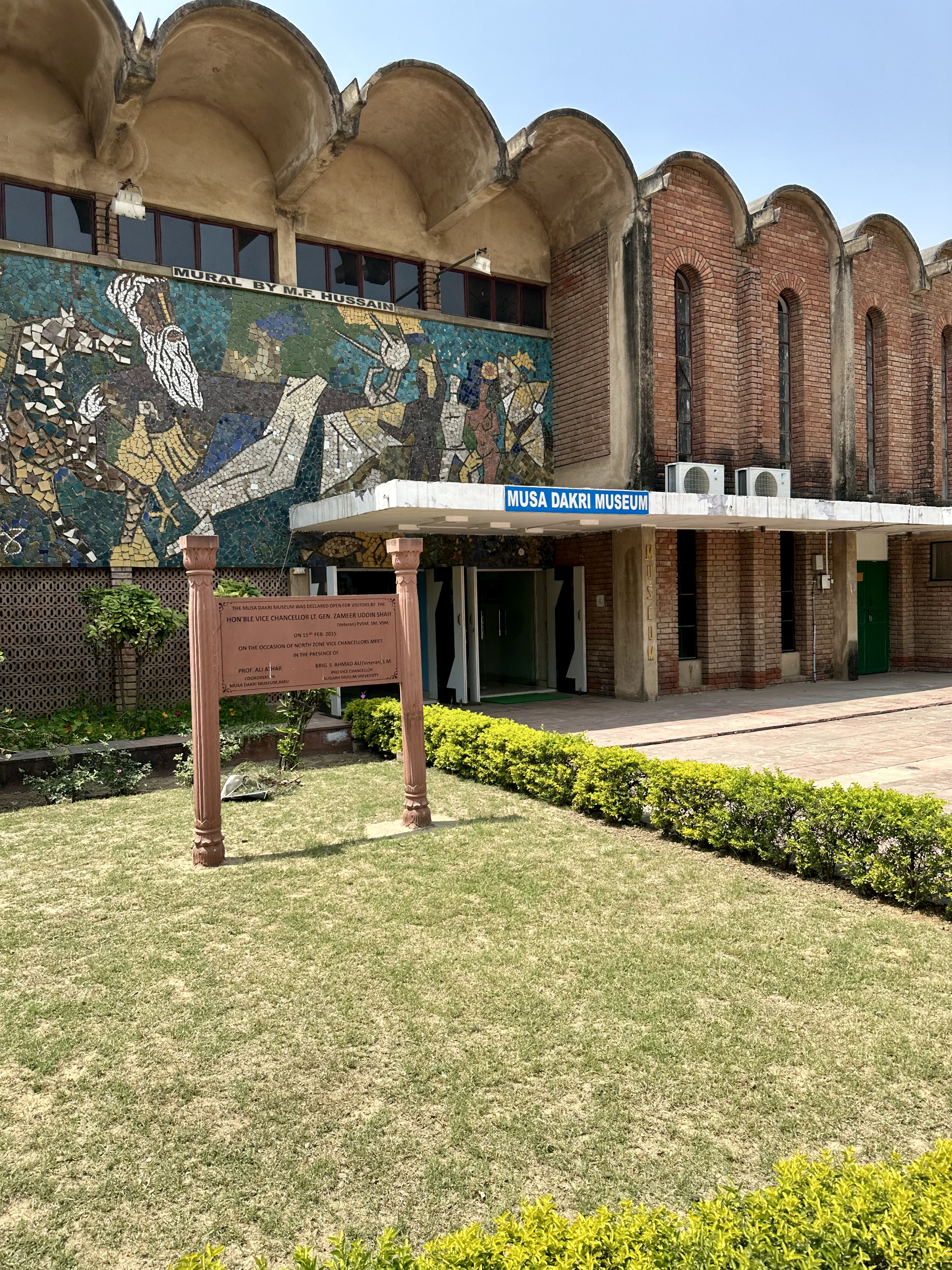
- Musa Dakri Museum (2023)
- Established: 2014
- Location: Aligarh Muslim University, Aligarh, Uttar Pradesh

The Musa Dakri Museum is a museum at the Aligarh Muslim University. It is housed in the Kennedy Hall.

== History ==
The Nizam Museum was the first museum at the university. The Sir Syed Archaeology museum was established in the 1950s.

The Musa Dakri Museum was established by the merger of these collections in 2014. It was named after Musa Dakri, who donated US$500,000 to the university. Some artefacts went missing in 2014, when they were to be shifted.

== Collections ==
=== Sir Syed Gallery ===
An inscription from the reign of Balban is housed here.

=== R. C. Gaur Gallery ===
This gallery contains artefacts excavated from Atranji Kheda.
