= 2016 Aligarh Muslim University campus violence =

Aligarh Muslim University campus violence
- Date: 23 April 2016
- Venue: Aligarh Muslim University (AMU)
- Location: Aligarh, India; region:IN-UP 27.9150085°N 78.0787925°E
- Type: Assault, arson
- Participants: Rival student groups of Azamgarh and Sambhal regions
- Deaths: 2
- Injuries: 1

On 23 April 2016, clashes between two regional student groups resulted in on-campus violence at Aligarh Muslim University (AMU). After a former student's death in the conflict, the state government was prompted to elevate the security and deploy Rapid Action Force.

== Incident ==
The Deputy inspector general of police (DIG) of the Aligarh Range, Govind Agarwal stated that incident started when a resident of Mumtaz hostel was assaulted and his room was set on fire. The victim of the assault then rushed to the proctor's office to file a complaint. As soon as news of the incident spread, students belonging to the two rival factions gathered resulting in a clash between the two. Police stated that the victim, Mehtaab was shot dead later that night near the proctor's office where the warring factions exchanged fire. The students set fire to a jeep, over half-a-dozen bikes as well as the proctor's office building. Due to the ensuing disruption, it took the police nearly two hours to regain control of the situation. An official of AMU said that relations between the two rival factions belonging to Azamgarh and Sambhal regions were distressed. Rapid Action Force was later deployed at all sensitive spots to ensure safety during the entrance test for the engineering college which was scheduled to happen the next day with more than 13,000 candidates expected to attend the examination at the Aligarh centre.

== Developments ==
On 24 April, Uttar Pradesh Additional Director General of Police (Law and Order), Daljeet Singh Chaudhary said that the police had identified the perpetrators responsible for the violence at the AMU campus. He stated that one person succumbed to bullet injury and another was critically injured and that the police would soon be able to nab the perpetrators responsible.

== See also ==
- 2017 DU protests
