= 2017 Delhi University protests =

2017 DU protests happened after the violence in Ramjas College of University of Delhi on 22 February 2017. 800 police personnel was deployed at the campus after the event.

== Background ==
On 21 February 2017, members of the Akhil Bharatiya Vidyarthi Parishad (ABVP) disrupted 'Cultures of Protest', a literature event organised by the English Department of the Ramjas College. On the morning of the 21st, ABVP members reached the Ramjas campus and started protesting the invitation to Umar Khalid and warned the organisers of violence if Khalid entered the campus. The college authorities, including college principal Rajendra Prasad and Prof. Mukul Mangalik, tried to reason with the protesting group but eventually gave up. Khalid, who had reached the nearby Vishwavidyalaya metro station turned back, on being informed of the situation by the organisers. To protest this, some students took out a rally within the college campus. When the rally returned to the venue of the event, they were welcomed by a hostile mob that pelted them with stones and chanted slogans like 'Vande Mataram' and 'Bharat Mata ki Jai'. The police then formed a cordon to allow the group into the venue. As the event continued, the ABVP members continued sloganeering outside. A student claimed that soon after a stone smashed through the window of the room. After this, those assembled had to evacuate through a back alley while the mob shouted threats of violence and rape against female students.

== See also ==
- 2016 Aligarh Muslim University campus violence
