= Bushra Ateeq =

Indian scientist

Bushra Ateeq is a Professor and a Senior Fellow of the DBT/Wellcome Trust India Alliance in the Department of Biological Sciences and Bioengineering (BSBE), IIT Kanpur specializing in cancer biology and molecular oncology. She was awarded the Shanti Swarup Bhatnagar Prize for Science and Technology in Medical Sciences in the year 2020. Her research interest involves exploration of the genetic and epigenetic changes that initiate cancer and its progression. She is also focusing on understanding the molecular events that drive cancer and resistance towards chemotherapeutic drugs.

Bushra Ateeq secured her MSc degree in 1997 and PhD degree in 2003 both from the Aligarh Muslim University.

== Honours and recognitions ==
- Shanti Swarup Bhatnagar Prize for Science and Technology in Medical Sciences (2020) by the Council of Scientific and Industrial Research (CSIR), Government of India.
- S. Ramachandran National Bioscience Award for Career Development (2020–21) by the Department of Biotechnology (DBT), Government of India.
- CSIR-Central Drug Research Institute Award (2020) for excellence in Drug Research under the Life Sciences category by the CSIR Central Drug Research Institute, Lucknow, India.
- Basanti Devi Amir Chand Prize in Biomedical Sciences (2019) by the Indian Council of Medical Research (ICMR), Government of India.
- CNR Rao Faculty Award for Excellence in Research conferred by IIT Kanpur (2019)
- Sayeeda Begum Women Scientist Prize (2019) for Excellence in Research conferred by Jamia Hamdard, New Delhi.
- Outstanding Young Faculty PK Kelkar Research Award conferred by IIT Kanpur (2017)
- Finalist of the NASI SCOPUS Young Scientist Award (2014) in the Medicine category.
- Ramanujan Fellowship from the Department of Science and Technology, India (Declined, 2013).
- Fast-Track Young Scientist Award from the Science and Engineering Research Board (SERB) 2013, Department of Science & Technology, Government of India.
- AACR Women in Cancer Research Scholar Award (2011) at the annual meeting of American Association for Cancer Research, Orlando, FL.
- Young Investigator Award (2009) from Expedition Inspiration Fund for Breast Cancer Research, Ketchum, Idaho.
- Genentech Postdoctoral Award (2009-2011) from the Genentech Foundation, South San Francisco, CA.
- Research Award (2005-2006) by the Canadian Institutes of Health Research (CHIR) for the strategic training program in Skeletal Health Research.
- Asian Scientist 100, Asian Scientist, 2021
