= Muslim University Riding Club =

Muslim University Riding Club (MURC) established as M.A.O. College riding school is a 137 year old club of the Aligarh Muslim University. Its players were also featured in the London magazine in 1974. MURC is the only riding club in a central university of India and has a strong riding squad of 19 members. The club is open to both male and female students.

The club publishes an annual magazine, Equestre. On April 26, 2026, MURC hosted its 136th annual horse show, "Equestria" at the University Athletics Ground, AMU.

== History ==
The club started when Sir Syed Ahmad Khan asked some landlords to send their horses to the college, so that the students could learn the art of horsemanship. The proposal was accepted and horse riding started in 1889. Nawab Mohd. Ismail Khan Sherwani laid the foundation of the riding club, and also presented four horses. A formal riding school was founded in 1893, at the suggestion of Theodore Morison.

The students of riding club followed the same course structure as the recruits in Bengal Cavalry. They were taught to ride horses by the appointed training master who was also a retired officer of the Bengal Cavalry. Rs 5 was charged from each student and Rs 3 who brought their own horses at the start of the riding school.

Naseeruddin Haider was the Captain in the early 1940s.N R Madhavan Menon was also the captain. Few notable Presidents of the club are Rajeev Sharma and Iqbal Ghani Khan.

== Awards and recognition ==
The riding team won twenty nine medals in the Ghaziabad Horse Show "Penta Grand 2012" and Delhi Horse Show 2012 organized by Army Polo and Riding Club.

Controversy
