= Nadir Ali Khan =

Pakistani tennis player

- Country (sports): Pakistan

Singles

Grand Slam singles results
- Wimbledon: Q1 (1978)
Medal record
Asian Games
Silver medal – second place	1978 Bangkok	Men's team
Bronze medal – third place	1978 Bangkok	Men's singles

Nadir Ali Khan is a Pakistan former professional tennis player.

Nadir is one of four children born to educationalist Zakir Ali Khan. A powerful serve-and-volley player, he was a national champion in singles and won two medals for Pakistan at the 1978 Asian Games, including a singles bronze. He competed for the Pakistan Davis Cup team from 1979 to 1981, winning two singles and one doubles rubber.
