= Sahibzada Aftab Ahmad Khan =

Indian attorney and educator (1867-1930)

- Born: May 1867; Kunjpura, Karnal district, Punjab Province, British India
- Died: January 1930 (aged 62); Aligarh, United Provinces
- Education: University of Cambridge
- Known for: Contributions towards development of Aligarh Muslim University,

Sahibzada Aftab Ahmad Khan (March 1867 – January 1930) was an attorney and educator. He was a former vice chancellor of Aligarh Muslim University.

== Early life ==
He was born in 1867 Kunjpura, Karnal district, Punjab Province, British India (now Karnal, Haryana), the son of Nawab Ghulam Ahmad Khan who was a member of Gwalior Council of Regency in the Gwalior State.

Sahibzada studied at Muhammadan Anglo Oriental College from 1878 until 1890. He attended Christ's College at Cambridge University, and was appointed Bar-at-Law from the Inner Temple in London before his return to India in 1894. Khan made Aligarh his home and became a practicing attorney.

== Career ==
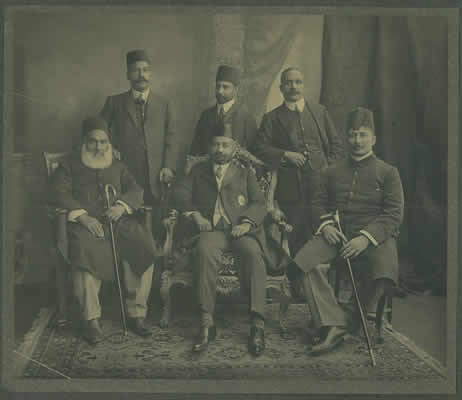
Khan (seated, first from right) with other leaders of the Aligarh movement.

Sir Syed recognized Khan's attachment to the college and in 1897 appointed him trustee. Later that year he was appointed professor of law in the college. After Sir Syed's death in 1898, Khan's involvement with the college deepened. He organized the Sir Syed memorial fund to raise the college to a university.

From 1905 to 1917 Sahibzada actively served the Mohammadan Education Conference as its joint secretary. In 1923 he became its president.

Khan was instrumental in establishing students’ voluntary organization, the Anjuman Al-farz or Duty Society. The duty was a student initiative. Its purpose was to collect funds to enable poor students to come to Aligarh and to promote the interest of the college within the Indian Muslim community and the country as a whole.

Khan was vice-chancellor of the university from 1924 to December 1926. Although he was persuaded to continue for a further term of three years, he declined the offer due to ill health. Most buildings and hostels after Sir Syed's death were constructed under his supervision, which gives the campus its charm.

He died on 18 January 1930 and was buried in the ground of the Ahmadi School for the Blind that he had established in Memory of his father. After his death, the A.M.U. old Boys’ Association decided to construct a Hall of residence in his memory in 1932 and in recognition of his valuable contribution named a Hall as Aftab Hall.
