= Sir Syed Mosque =

Mosque in Aligarh, Uttar Pradesh, India

Sir Syed Mosque (Aligarh Jama Masjid)
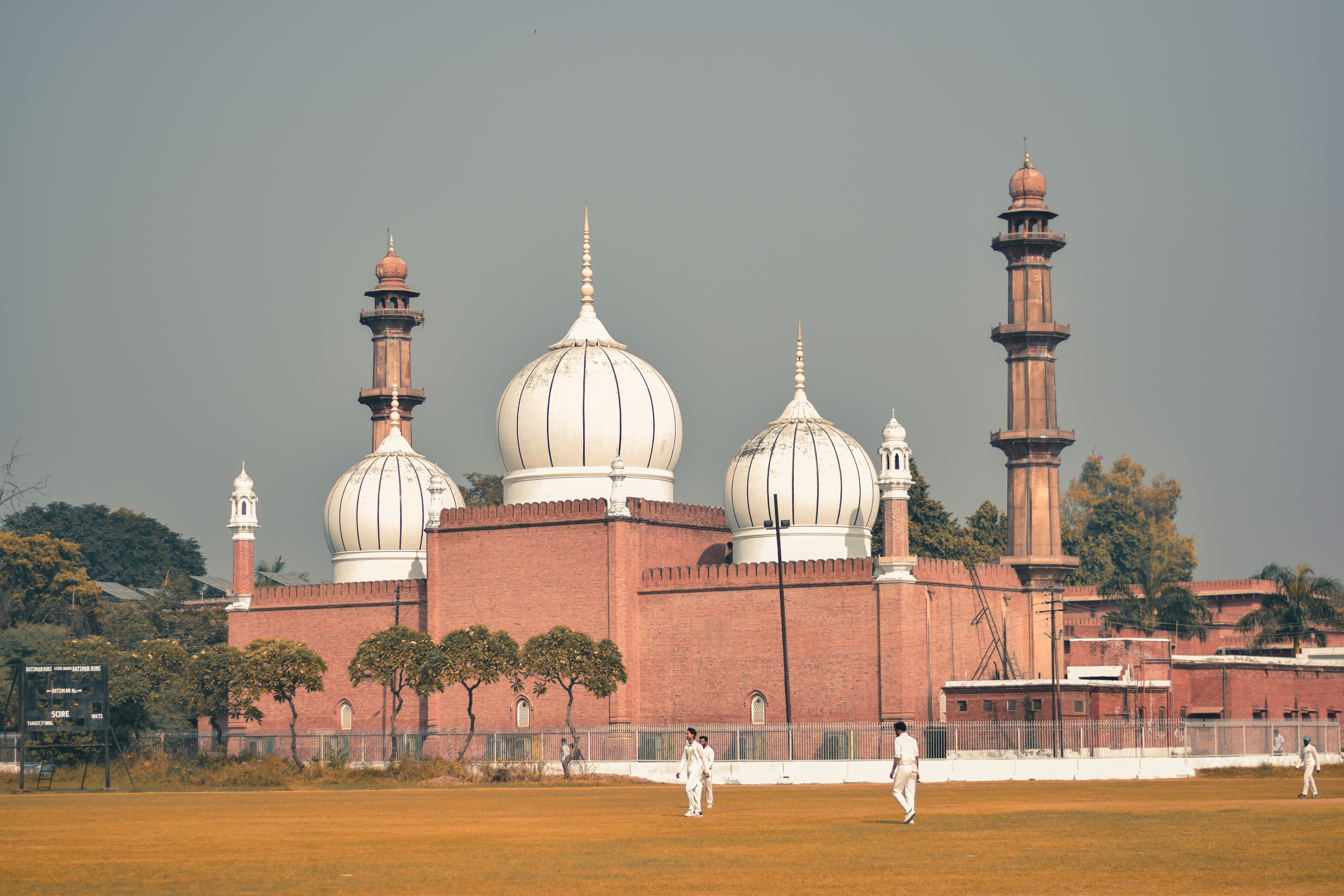
- Rear view of AMU Jama Masjid in November 2025

- Location of the mosque in Uttar Pradesh

Religion
- Affiliation: Islam
- Festival: Urs: 27 March
- Ecclesiastical or organisational status: Friday mosque
- Status: Active
- Adjacent tomb of: Sir Syed Ahmad Khan

Location
- Location: Aligarh Muslim University, Aligarh, Uttar Pradesh
- Country: India
- Coordinates: 27°54′36″N 78°04′53″E

Architecture
- Architect: IIT Roorkee
- Type: Mosque architecture
- Style: Mughal
- Founder: Sir Syed Ahmad Khan
- Groundbreaking: 1879
- Completed: 1915

Specifications
- Dome: Three
- Minaret: Two

Sir Syed Mosque, officially the Sir Syed House Mosque and known locally as the Aligarh Jama Masjid, is a Friday mosque located in the heart of Aligarh Muslim University campus, in Aligarh, in the state of Uttar Pradesh, India. The mosque is situated in a large courtyard in the centre of the university, called the Sir Syed Hall. The tomb of Sir Syed Ahmed Khan is located adjacent to the mosque.

== Overview ==
The construction of Jama Masjid was started in 1879 by the founder of the university, Sir Syed Ahmad Khan and completed in January 1915. The design of the mosque resembles the huge Mughal Badshahi Mosque of Lahore; and was designed by the Architecture Department of Thompson Engineering College in Roorkee on the pattern of the grand Shahi Masjid, in Delhi. The mosque is well-known for its tolerance in enabling Sunnis and Shi'ite Muslims to worship together.

The inscriptions from the Akbarabadi Mosque, that was destroyed in 1857, were installed at the mosque. These inscriptions are significant as they were designed by Amanat Khan, who also worked on the inscriptions at the Taj Mahal.

== Gallery ==
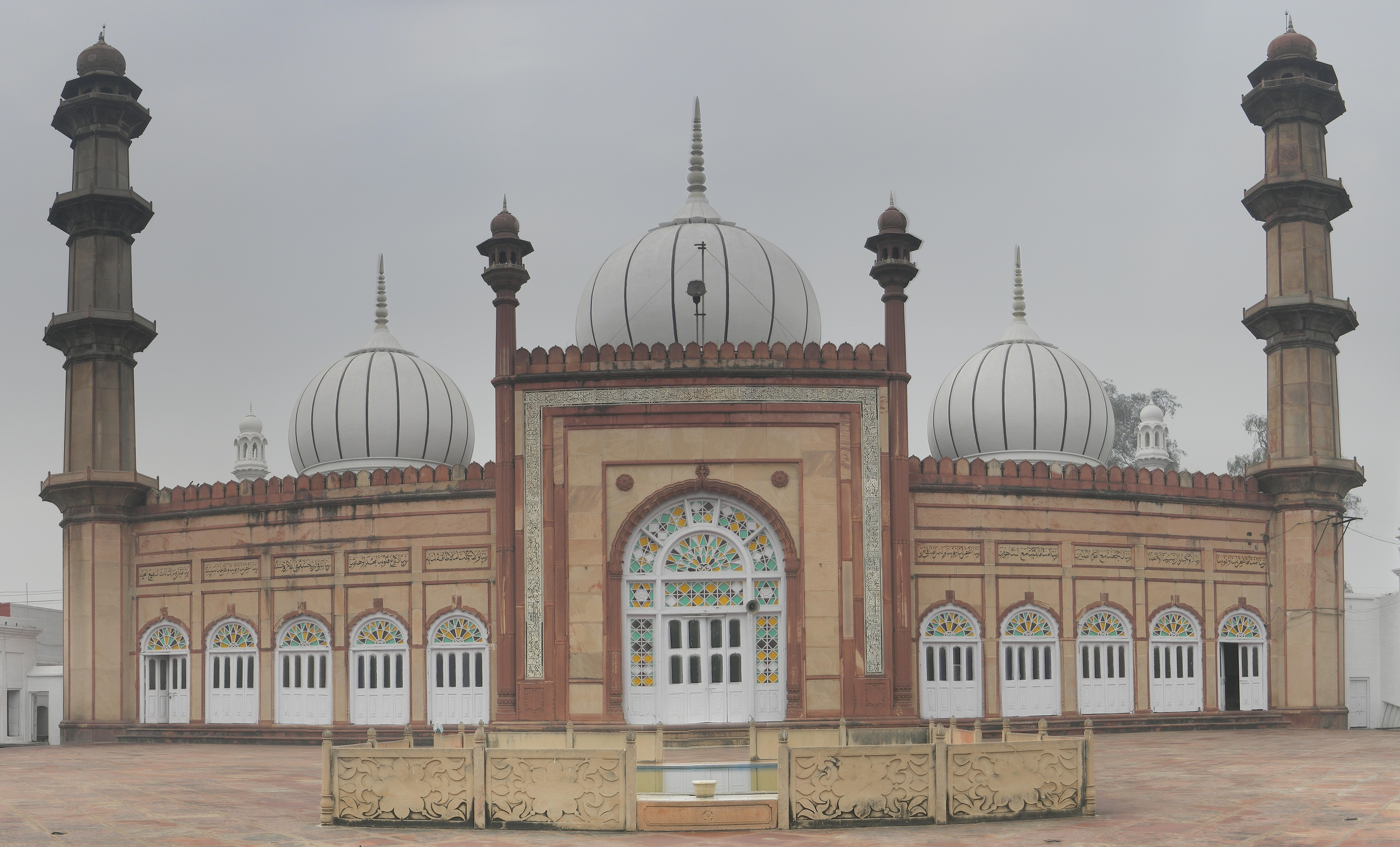
The mosque façade

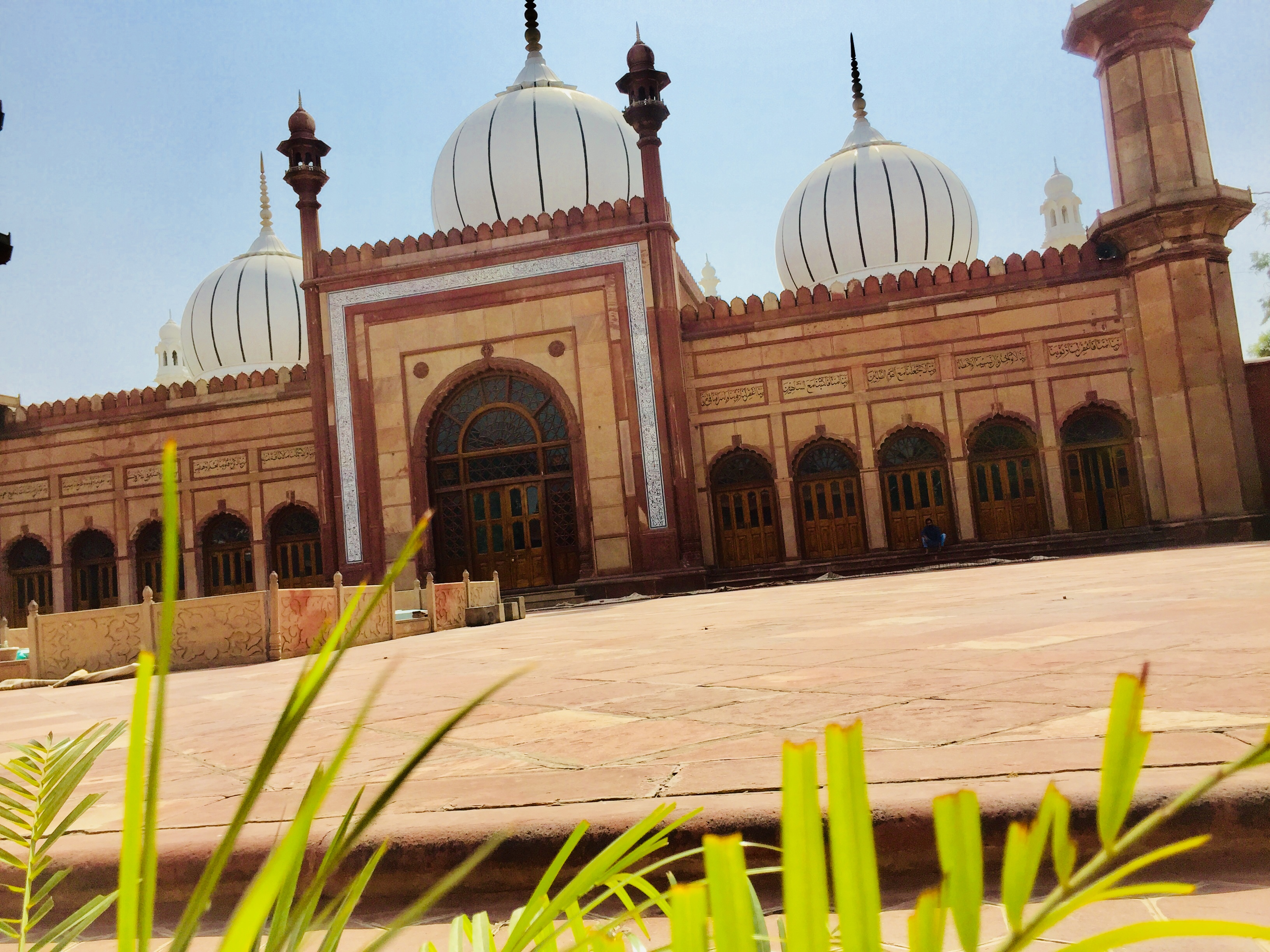
The mosque courtyard

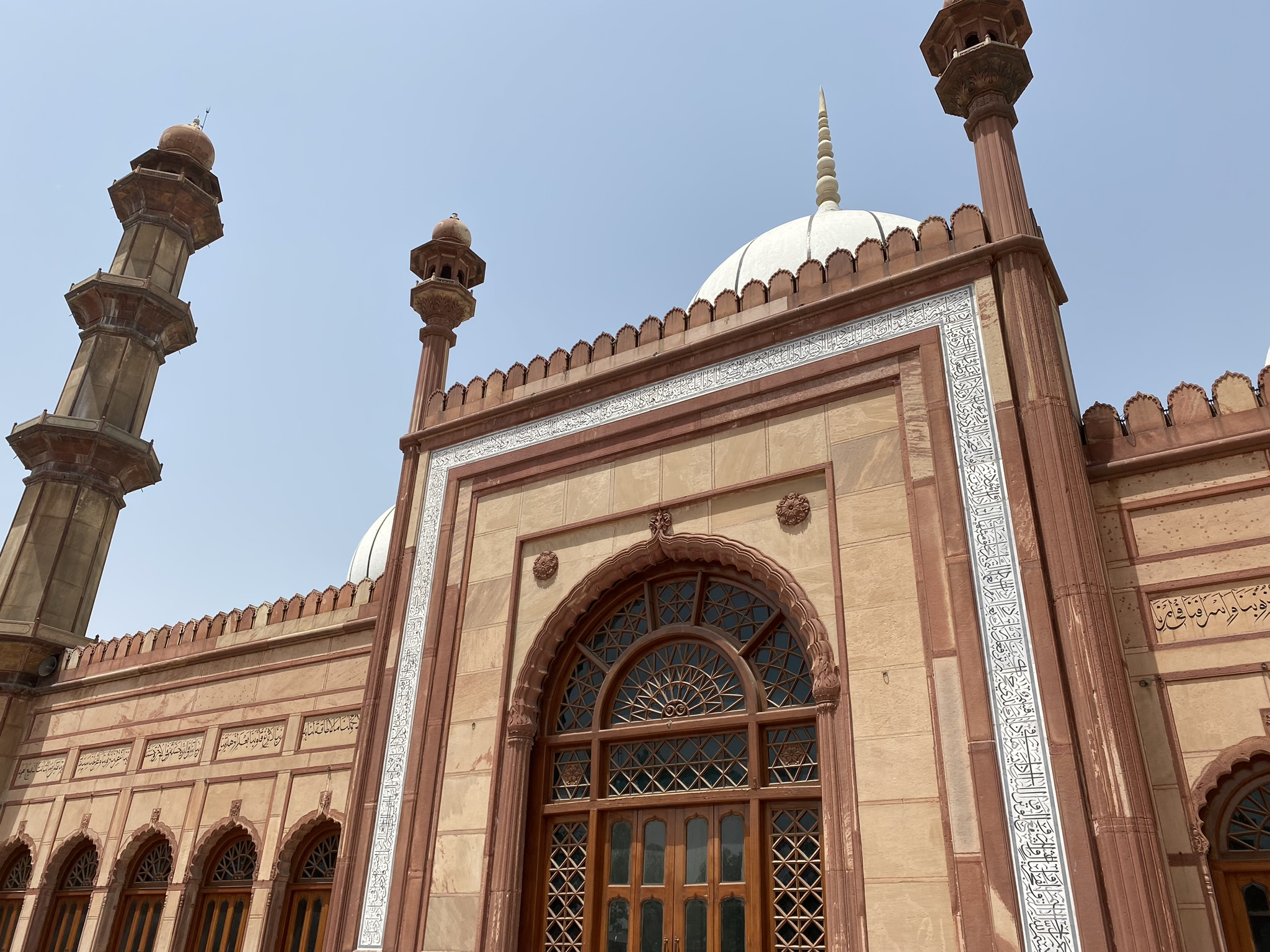
Side view of the mosque

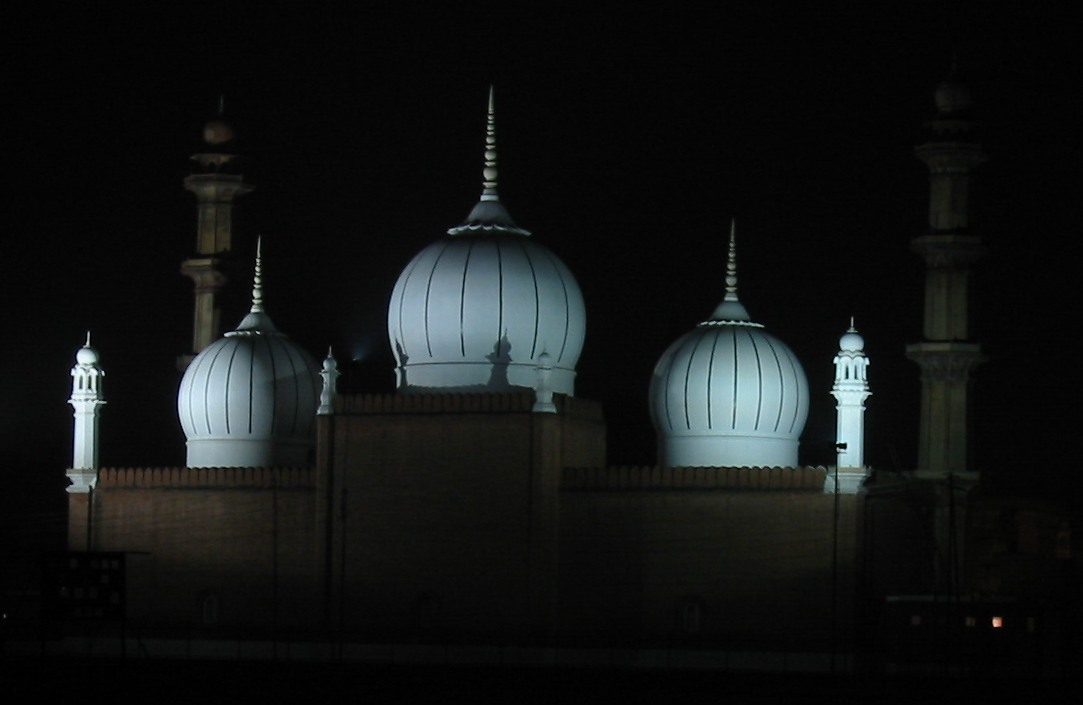
The mosque domes at night

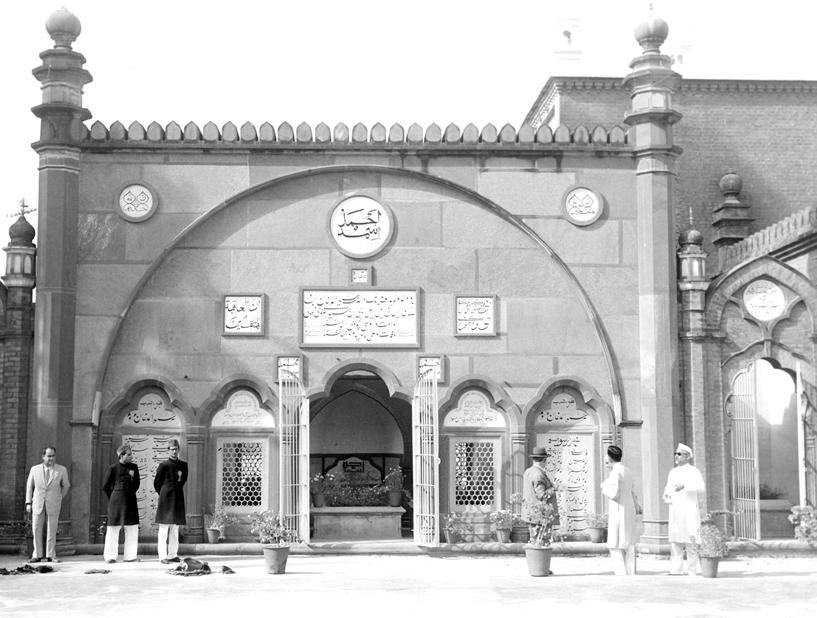
The tomb of Sir Syed Ahmed Khan, in 1953

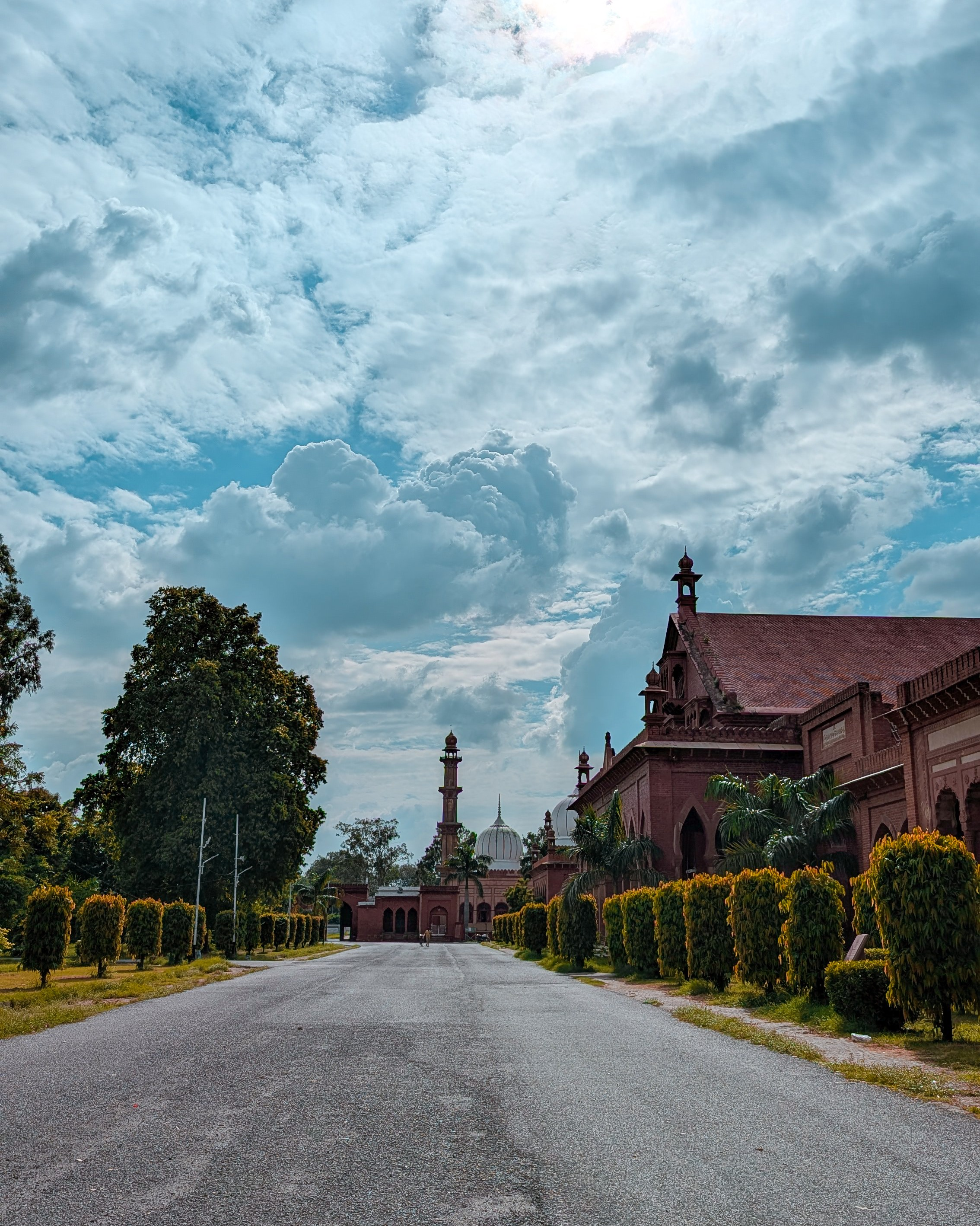
Sir Syed Mosque and Strachey Hall

== See also ==
- Islam in India
- List of mosques in India
