= Aligarh Muslim University Act, 1920 =

Act of Imperial Legislative Council of India

Imperial Legislative Council
- Long title: An Act to incorporate a teaching and residential Muslim University at Aligarh.
- Citation: Act No. 40 of 1920
- Territorial extent: India
- Enacted by: Imperial Legislative Council
- Enacted: 14 September 1920
- Commenced: 1 December 1920

Amended by
- Aligarh Muslim University (Amendment) Act, 1931; Aligarh Muslim University (Amendment) Act, 1935; Aligarh Muslim University (Amendment) Act, 1941; Aligarh Muslim University (Amendment) Act, 1943; Aligarh Muslim University (Amendment) Act, 1945; Aligarh Muslim University (Amendment) Act, 1951; Aligarh Muslim University (Amendment) Act, 1965; Aligarh Muslim University (Amendment) Act, 1972; Aligarh Muslim University (Amendment) Act, 1981
- Status: In force

The Aligarh Muslim University Act, 1920 is an act of Imperial Legislative Council enacted in 1920. The Act was amended in 1951 in order to repeal sections on Islamic teachings. The Act was amended in 1967 which was challenged in Azeez Basha case. In 2005, the Allahabad High Court quashed the Aligarh Muslim University (Amendment) Act, 1981, as unconstitutional and declared that the AMU was not a minority institution. Therefore, the notification issued by the Human Resource Development Ministry in February permitting the university to reserve seats for Muslims in post-graduate medical courses was illegal.

== Minority status ==
The Act is notable for the debate on whether the Aligarh Muslim University had minority status, which came under the scrutiny of the Supreme Court of India. AMU was declared a minority institution by the AMU Amendment Act in 1981 by the Parliament. The Allahabad High Court ruled in 2005 that AMU Amendment Act of 1981 was unconstitutional. The UPA government appealed to the Supreme Court. However, the NDA Government withdrew the appeal in 2016.
