= Aligarh Muslim University: Murshidabad Centre =

University center in Uttar Pradesh, India

Aligarh Muslim University, Murshidabad Centre
- Motto: Arabic: عَلَّمَ الاِنْسَانَ مَا لَمْ يَعْلَم 'allama’l-insāna mā lam ya‘lam
- Motto in English: Taught man what he did not know (Qur'an 96:5)
- Type: Public
- Established: 2010
- Academic affiliations: UGC, NAAC, AIU
- Vice-Chancellor: Tariq Mansoor
- Faculty: 30+
- Students: 400+
- Location: Jangipur Barrage, Murshidabad, 742223, Murshidabad district, West Bengal, India
- Campus: Rural, 288 acres
- Colors
- Website: www.amu.ac.in/amucentres/amu-murshidabad-centre/home-page

Aligarh Muslim University: Murshidabad Centre is one of the prominent educational institutions of Aligarh Muslim University. A new chapter of educational enlightenment was added to the culturally enriched soil of Bengal with the establishment of Aligarh Muslim University, Murshidabad Centre in 2010. The Centre, accredited by NAAC in A grade, is empowered by Section 5(2) (C) of the AMU (Amendment) Act, 1981 and under Section 12(2) of the University Act. [Act XL 1920 and AMU (Amendment) Act, 1972].

== Geography ==
Cities, towns and locations in the southern portion of Jangipur subdivision, Murshidabad district (including Suti I, Raghunathganj I, Raghunathganj II, Sagardighi CD blocks)
M: municipal town, CT: census town, R: rural/ urban centre, F: Facility
Abbreviation- TPS: Thermal Power Station, AMU: Aligarh Muslim University
Owing to space constraints in the small map, the actual locations in a larger map may vary slightly. All places marked in the map are linked in the larger full screen map.

=== Location ===
AMU Murshidabad Centre is located at 24.5184°N 88.0441°E.

It is located nearly 40km from Farakka and 60km from Behrampore towns of Murshidabad. It is well connected with road and railway networks. It lies 250km North of Kolkata on NH34 and the nearest railway junction is Jangipur Road (approx 08km). By air, it can be reached through Netaji Subhash Chandra Bose International Airport, Kolkata.

== History ==
Aligarh Muslim University is the creation of the movement. The Aligarh Movement had a profound impact on the Indian society, particularly on the Muslim society in terms of Socio-Economic and Political upliftment. The impact of Aligarh Movement was not confined to the Northern India only, but its expansion could be seen on the other regions of the Indian sub-continent during the 20th century.

In 2008, the AMU submitted a detailed proposal to the Government of India for establishment of five AMU centres in different parts of the country. The government of India responded by granting fund for its two Centres Malappuram and Murshidabad.

Aligarh Muslim University has established three centres at Malappuram, (Kerala) and Murshidabad, and Kishanganj, (Bihar) while a site was identified for Aurangabad, (Maharashtra) centre.

== See also ==
- AMU Malappuram Campus
