= Aligarh Muslim University =

Public university in Uttar Pradesh, India

- Official seal of AMU
- Other name: AMU
- Former name: Muhammadan Anglo-Oriental College (1875–1919)
- Motto: ʻallam al-insān-a mā lam yaʻlam
- Motto in English: Taught man what he knew not (Qur'an 96:5)
- Type: Public research university
- Established: 1920; 106 years ago
- Founders: Sir Syed Ahmed Khan; Aga Khan III
- Accreditation: NAAC, NBA, UGC
- Affiliations: NIRF
- Academic affiliations: ACU, AIU, AICTE, BCI, CCIM, COA, DCI, DGCA, ICAR, INC, NCTE, NMC, PCI, WES
- Budget: ₹1,036 crore (US$110 million) (2019–20)
- Chancellor: Mufaddal Saifuddin
- Vice-Chancellor: Naima Khatoon
- Visitor: President of India
- Students: 18,618
- Undergraduates: 12,610
- Postgraduates: 5,756
- Doctoral students: 252
- Location: Aligarh, Uttar Pradesh, India; 27.9150°N 78.0788°E
- Campus: Urban, 1,155 acres (467 ha)
- Colours
- Sporting affiliations: NCC, NSS
- Website: amu.ac.in

Aligarh Muslim University is an Indian collegiate, public, and research university located in Aligarh, Uttar Pradesh which was originally established by Sir Syed Ahmad Khan as the Muhammadan Anglo-Oriental College in 1875. Muhammadan Anglo-Oriental College became Aligarh Muslim University in 1920, following the Aligarh Muslim University Act.

The university offers more than 300 courses in traditional and modern branches of education. It is an Institute of National Importance and is listed in the Union List under the Seventh Schedule of the Constitution of India.

== History ==
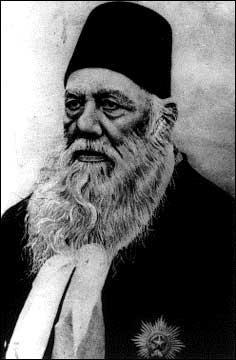
Sir Syed Ahmad Khan, the founder of Aligarh Muslim University

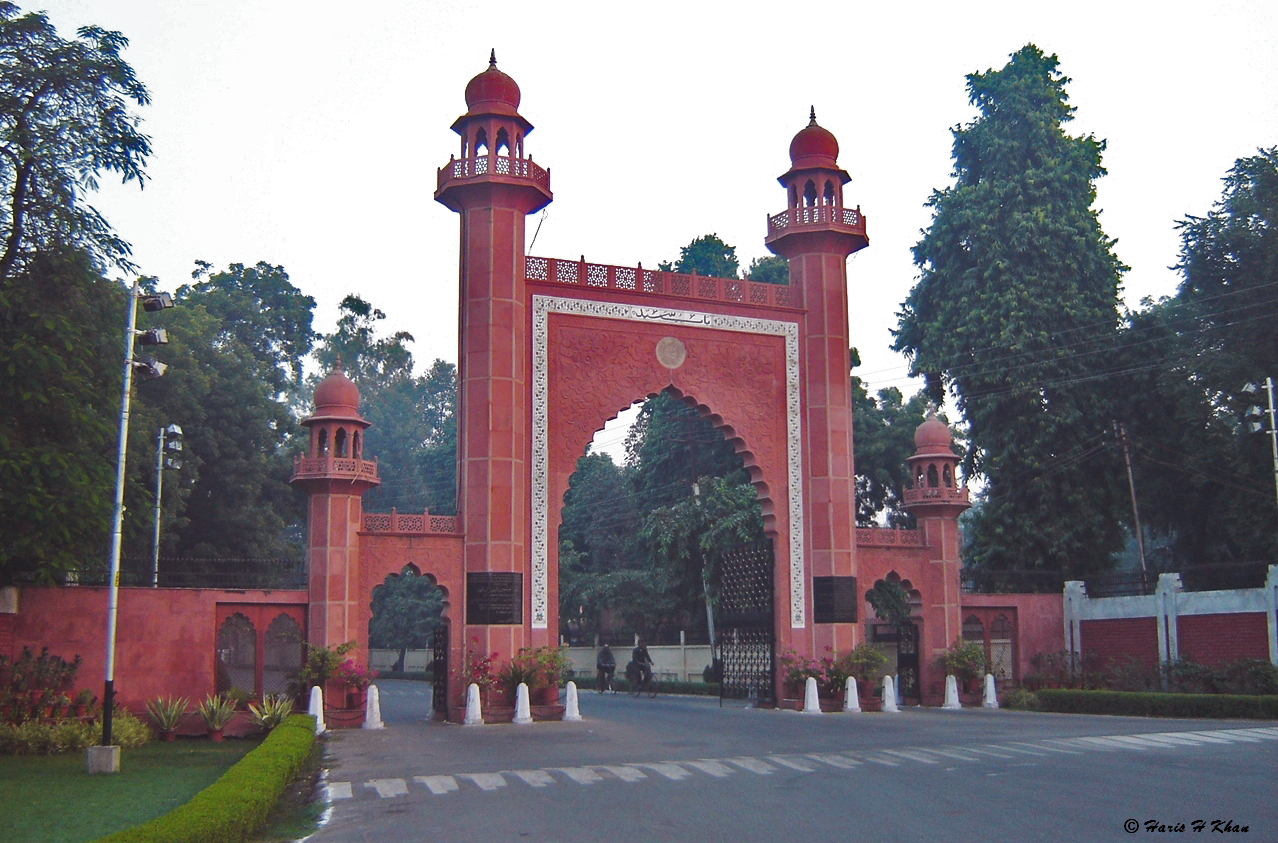
Bab-e-Syed, entrance to the university

=== Background ===
The university has its roots in the Muhammadan Anglo-Oriental College, established in 1875 by Sir Syed Ahmad Khan. It began to function on 24 May 1875. A movement was associated with Sir Syed Ahmad Khan and the college came to be known as the Aligarh Movement, which pushed to materialise the need for establishing a modern education system for the Indian Muslim populace. He considered competence in English and Western sciences necessary skills for maintaining Muslims' political influence. Khan's vision for the college was based on his visit to Oxford University and Cambridge University, and he wanted to establish an education system similar to the British model.

A committee was formed by the name of foundation of Muslim College and asked people to fund generously. Then Viceroy and Governor General of India Thomas Baring gave a donation of ₹10,000 while the Lt. Governor of the North Western Provinces contributed ₹1,000, and by March 1874 funds for the college stood at ₹1,53,920 and 8 annas. Maharaja Mahindra Singh Saab Bahadur of Patiala contributed ₹58,000 while Raja Shambhu Narayan of Benaras donated ₹60,000. Donations also came in from the Maharaja of Vizianagaram as well. The college was initially affiliated to the University of Calcutta for the matriculate examination but became an affiliate of Allahabad University in 1885. The seventh Nizam of Hyderabad, HEH Mir Osman Ali Khan made a remarkable donation of ₹5,00,000 to this institution in the year 1918.

=== Establishment as university ===
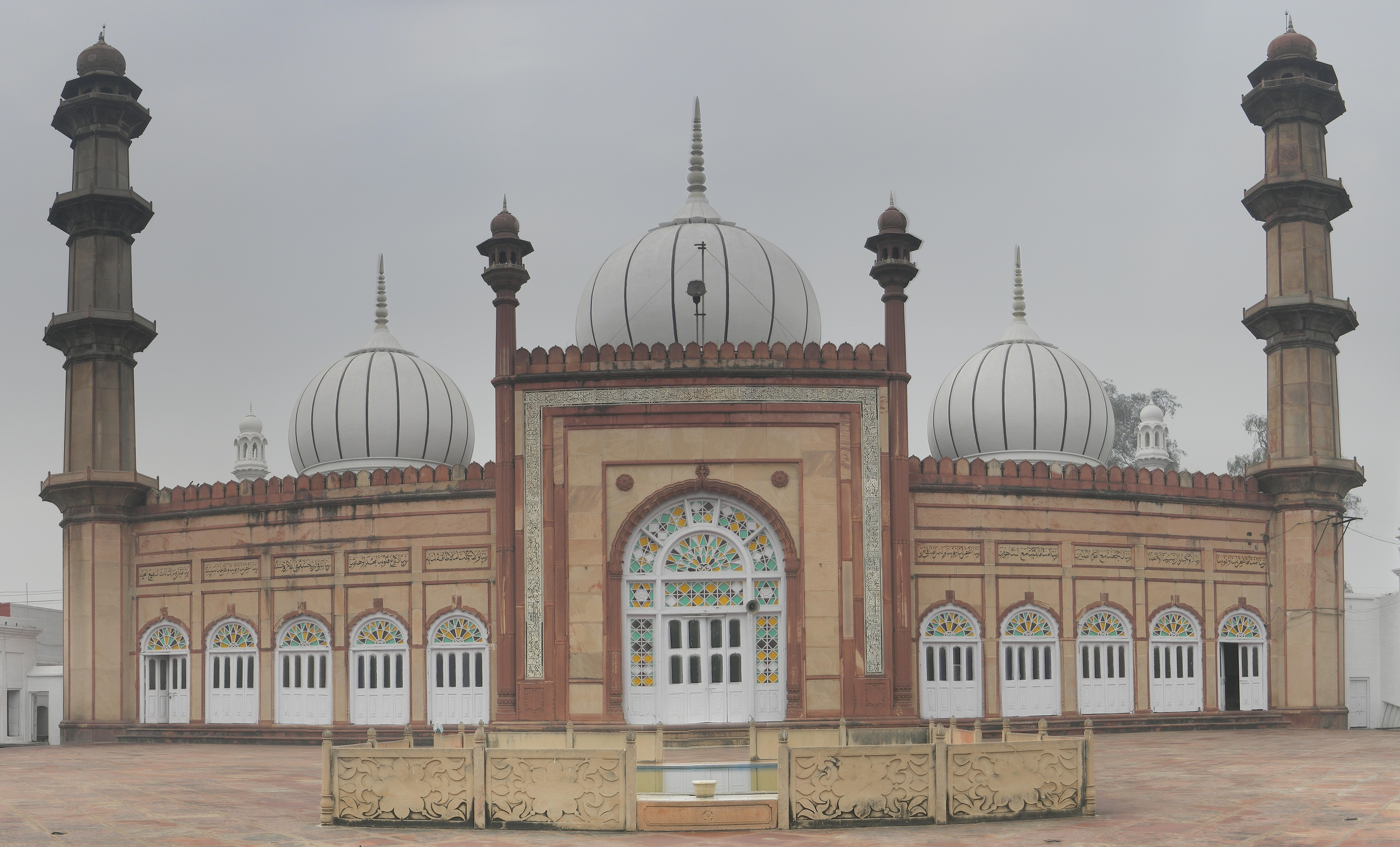
Mosque at the Aligarh Muslim University

Around 1900, the Muslim University Association was formed to spearhead efforts to transform the college into a university. The Government of India informed the association that a sum of rupees thirty lakhs should be collected to establish the university. Therefore, a Muslim University Foundation Committee was started and it collected the necessary funds. The contributions were made by Muslims as well as non-Muslims. Mohammad Ali Mohammad Khan and Aga Khan III had helped in realising the idea by collecting funds for building the Aligarh Muslim University. With the MAO College as a nucleus, the Aligarh Muslim University was then established by the Aligarh Muslim University Act, 1920. In 1927, the Ahmadi School for the Visually Challenged, Aligarh Muslim University was established and in the following year, a medical school was attached to the university. The college of unani medicine, Ajmal Khan Tibbya College, was established in 1927, and the Ajmal Khan Tibbiya College Hospital was established later in 1932. The Jawaharlal Nehru Medical College And Hospital was established in 1962 as a part of the university. In 1935, the Zakir Husain College of Engineering and Technology was also established as a constituent of the university.

Before 1939, faculty members and students supported an all-India nationalist movement, but after 1939, political sentiment shifted towards support for a Muslim separatist movement. Students and faculty members supported Muhammad Ali Jinnah and the university came to be a center of the Pakistan Movement.

=== Women's education ===
Sheikh Abdullah ("Papa Mian") is the founder of the Women's College of Aligarh Muslim University and had pressed for women's education, writing articles while also publishing a monthly women's magazine, Khatoon. To start the college for women, he had led a delegation to the Lt. Governor of the United Provinces while also writing a proposal to Sultan Jahan, Begum of Bhopal. Begum Jahan had allocated a grant of ₹100 per month for the education of women. On 19 October 1906, he successfully started a school for girls with five students and one teacher at a rented property in Aligarh. The foundation stone for the girls' hostel was laid by him and his wife, Waheed Jahan Begum ("Ala Bi"), after struggles on 7 November 1911. Later, a high school was established in 1921, gaining the status of an intermediate college in 1922, finally becoming a constituent of the Aligarh Muslim University as an undergraduate college in 1937. Later, Abdullah's daughters also served as principals of the women's college. One of his daughters was Mumtaz Jahan Haider, during whose tenure as principal Maulana Abdul Kalam Azad had visited the university and offered a grant of ₹9,00,000. She was involved in the establishment of the Women's College, organised various extracurricular events, and reasserted the importance of education for Muslim women.

The professional courses are run with a co-educational system. Female students are accommodated in six well established halls of residence, where they have all facilities of living and studies. The hostels inside these halls are equipped with reading rooms, common rooms, sports facilities, and dining halls.

=== Minority institution status ===
Aligarh Muslim University is considered to be an institution of national importance, under the seventh schedule of the Constitution of India. In 1967, a constitution bench of the Supreme Court had held that the university is not a minority educational institution protected under the Indian constitution; the verdict had been given in a case to which the university was not a party. In 1981, an amendment was made to the Aligarh Muslim University Act, following which in 2006 the Allahabad High Court struck down the provision of the act which accorded the university minority educational institution status. In April 2016, the Indian government stated that it would not appeal against the decision. In February 2019, the issue was referred by the Supreme Court of India to a constitution bench of seven judges.

In November 2024, seven-judge bench of the Supreme Court, by a 4:3 majority, overruled a previous 1967 judgement in the case of S. Azeez Basha vs. Union of India. The 1967 ruling had stated that an institution established by a statute, such as the Aligarh Muslim University (AMU), could not claim minority status. The Supreme Court verdict overturned this precedent, paving the way for AMU to potentially assert its rights as a minority institution. However, the final determination of AMU's minority status will be decided by a separate bench, which will examine the specific provisions of the AMU Act.

== Main campus ==
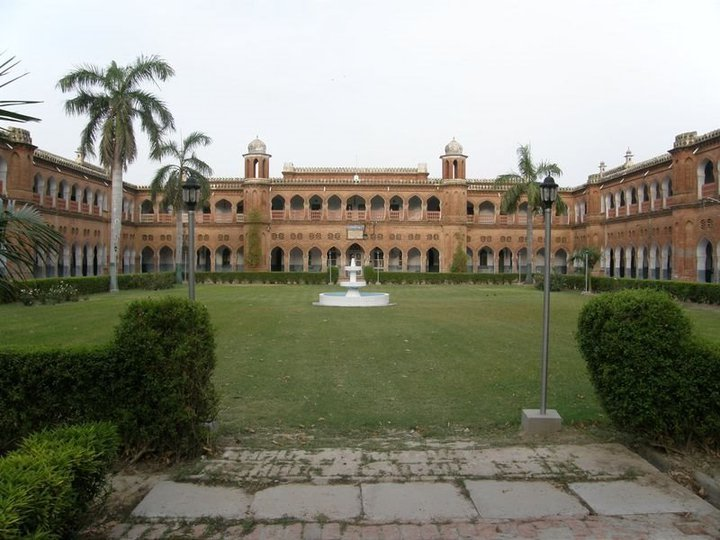
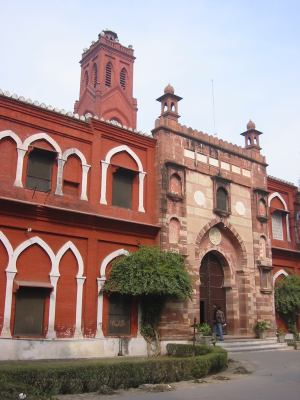
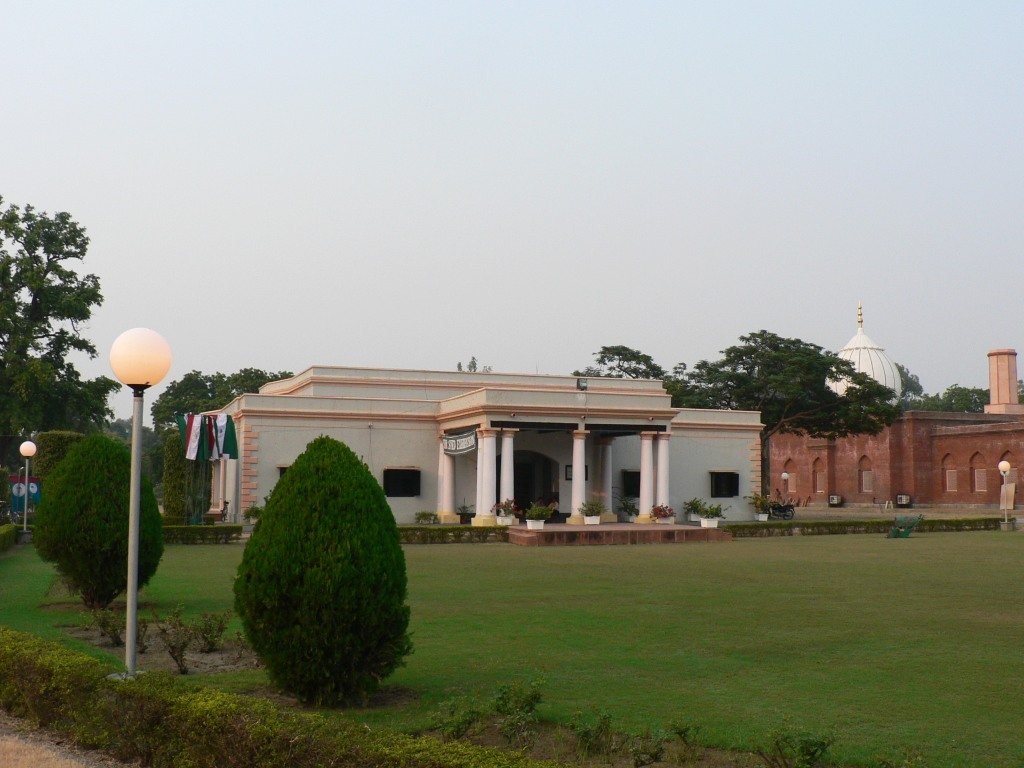
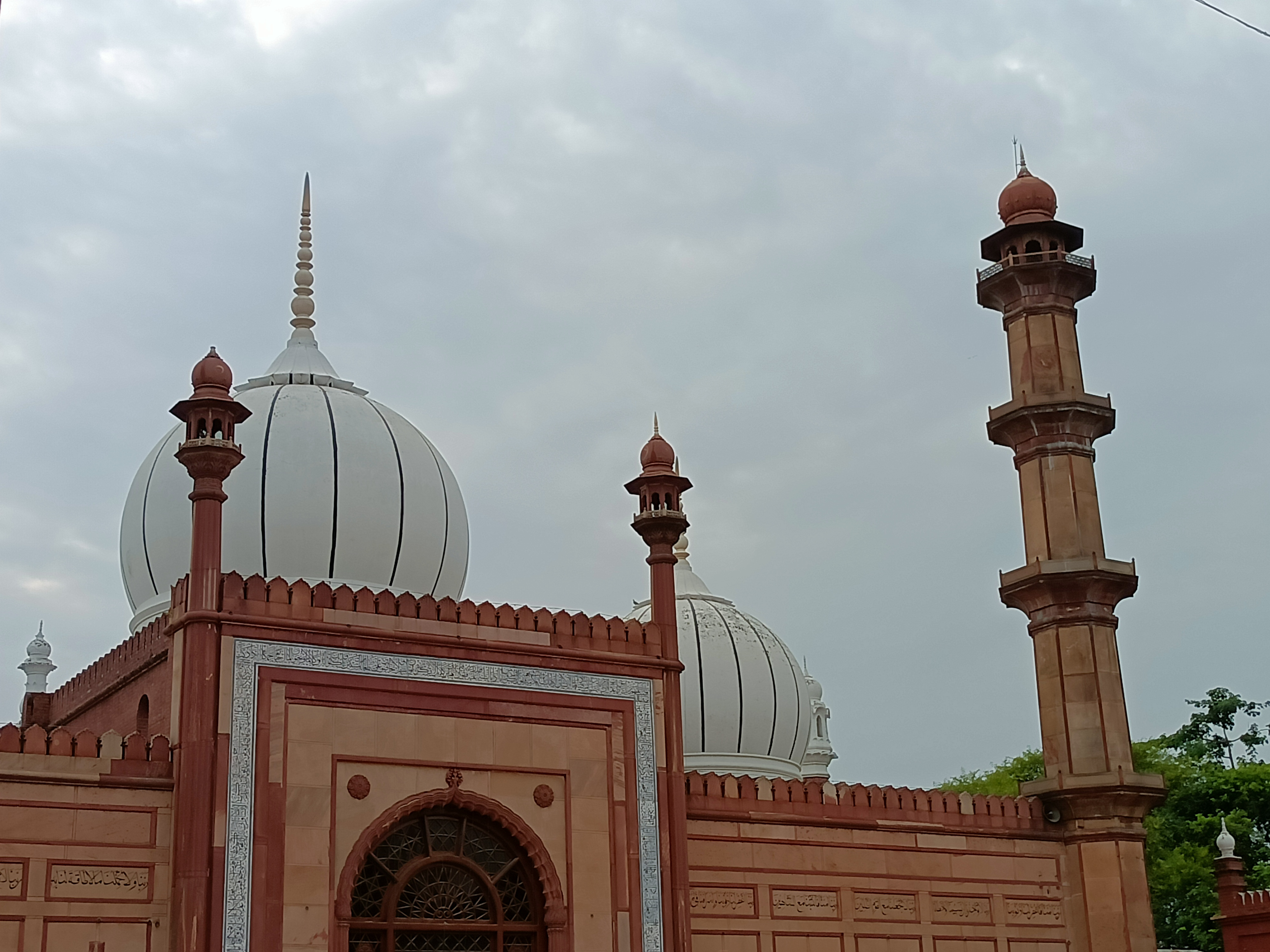
Clockwise: Syedna Taher Saifuddin School, Victoria Gate, Central Mosque, Sir Syed House

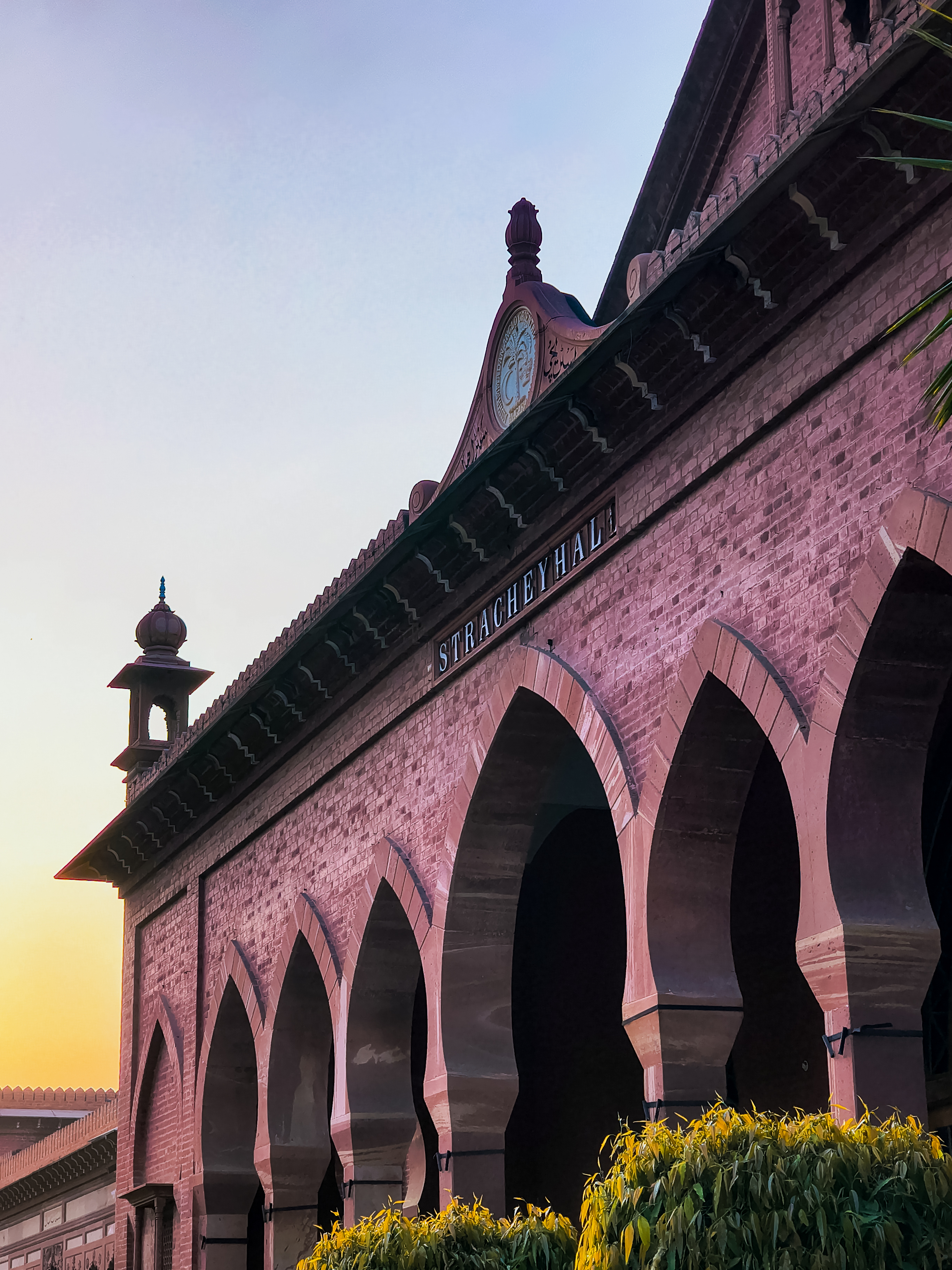
Strachey Hall, AMU campus

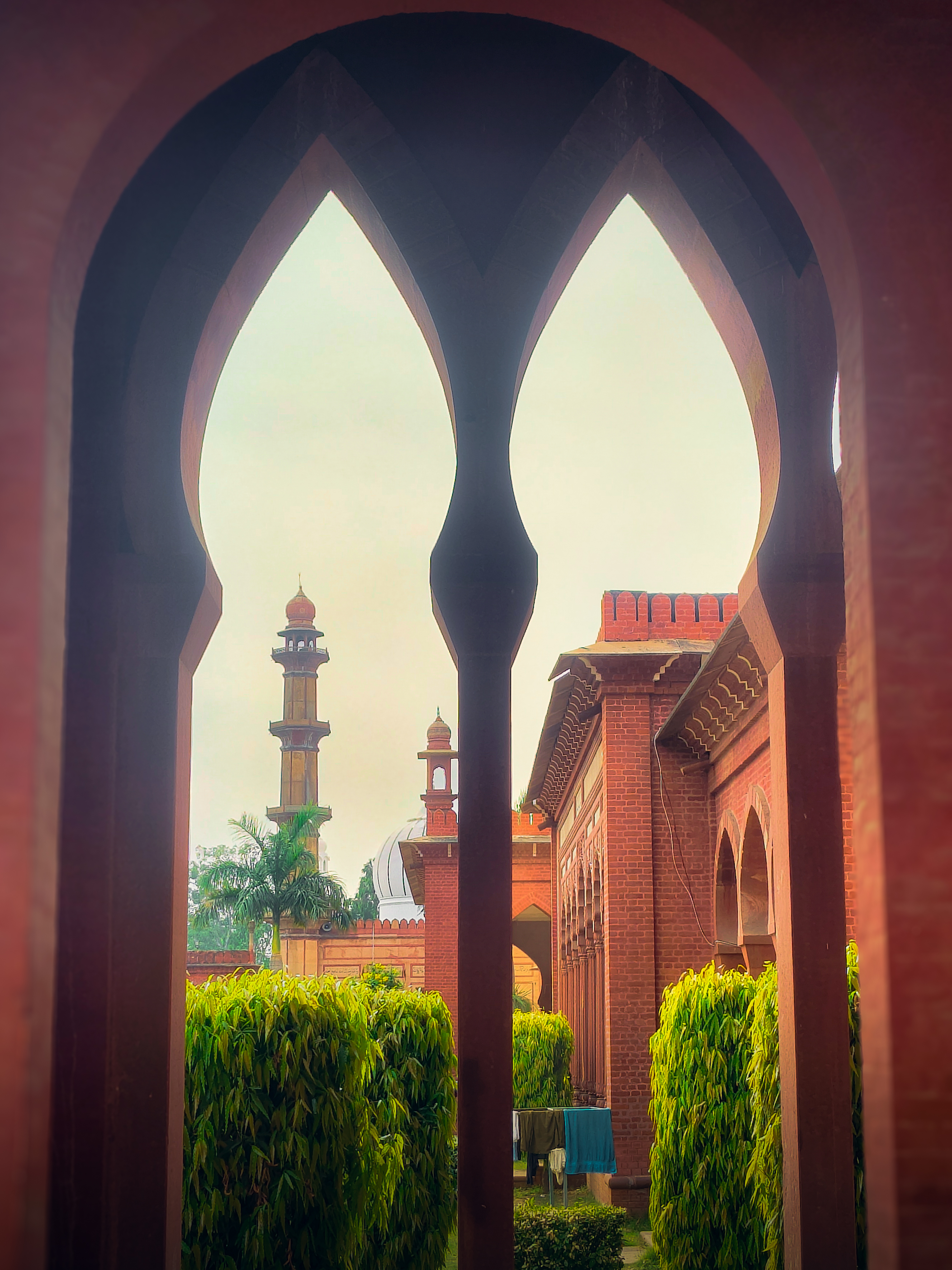
Jama Masjid at Aligarh Muslim University, 2026

The campus of Aligarh Muslim University is spread over 467.6 hectares in the city of Aligarh, Uttar Pradesh. The nearest railway station is the Aligarh Junction.

It is a residential university, with most of the staff and students residing on the campus. There are 19 halls of residence for students (13 for boys and 6 for girls) with 80 hostels. The halls are administered by a provost and a number of teacher wardens who look after different hostels. Each hall maintains a dining hall, a common room with facilities for indoor games, a reading room, a library, sports clubs and a literary and cultural society. The halls are named after people associated with the Aligarh Movement and the university.

Sir Syed Hall is the oldest hall of the university. It houses many heritage buildings, such as Strachey Hall, Mushtaq Manzil, Asman Manzil, Nizam Museum and Lytton Library, Victoria Gate, and Sir Syed Mosque.

The campus also maintains a cricket ground, Willingdon Pavilion, a synthetic hockey ground and a park, Gulistan-e-Syed.

Other notable buildings in the campus includes the Maulana Azad Library, Moinuddin Ahmad Art Gallery, Kennedy Auditorium, Musa Dakri Museum, the Cultural Education Centre, Siddons Debating Union Hall and Sir Syed House.

The main university gate is called Bab-e-Syed. In 2020 a new gate called Centenary Gate was built to celebrate the centenary year of the university.

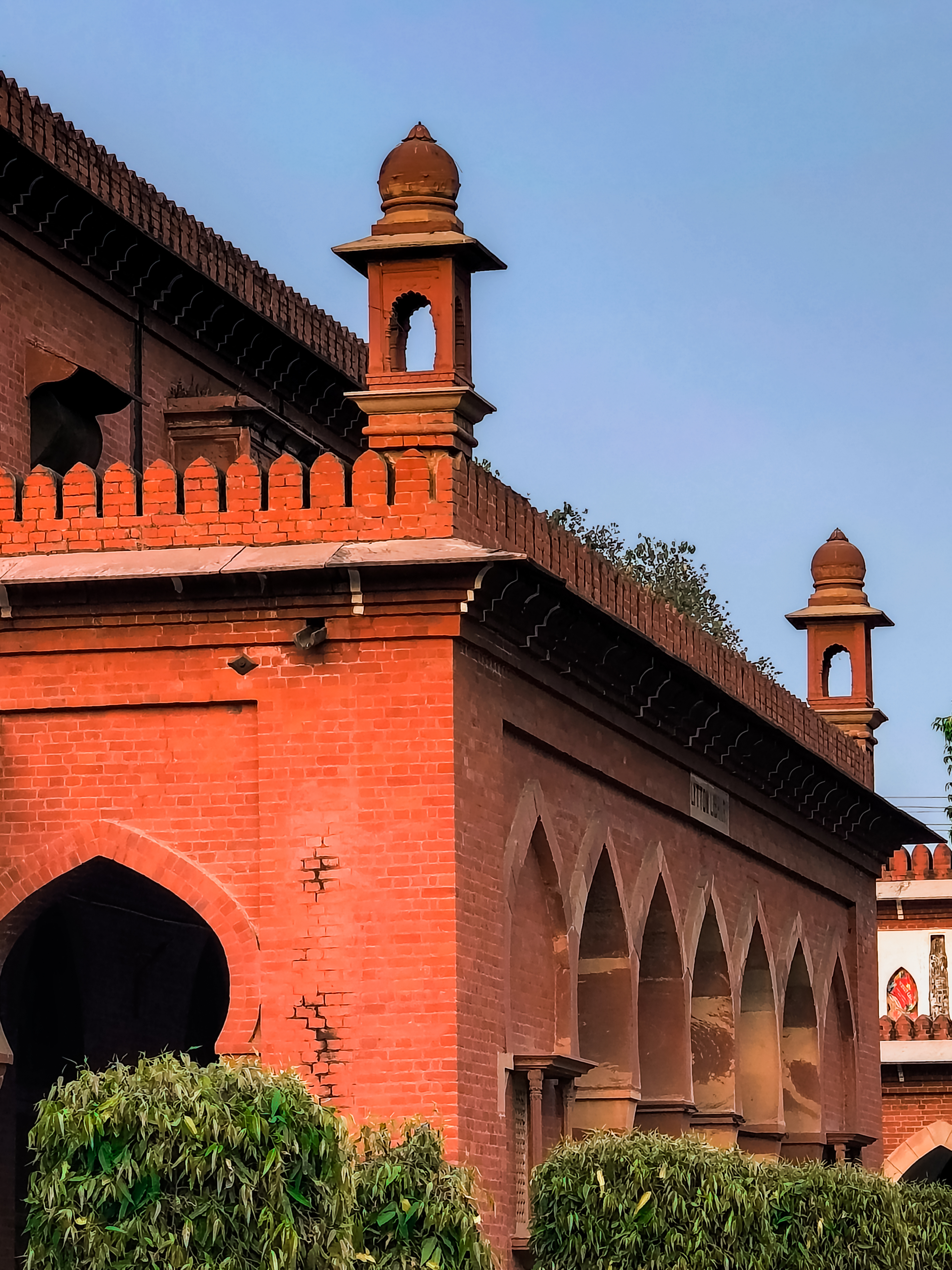
SS Hall at Aligarh Muslim University campus

== Organisation and administration ==
=== Governance ===
The university's formal head is the chancellor, though this is a titular figure, and is not involved with the day-to-day running of the university. The chancellor is elected by the members of the University Court. The university's chief executive is the vice-chancellor, appointed by the President of India on the recommendation of the court. The court is the supreme governing body of the university and exercises all the powers of the university, not otherwise provided for by the Aligarh Muslim University Act, and the statutes, ordinances and regulations of the university.

In 2018, Mufaddal Saifuddin was elected chancellor and Ibne Saeed Khan, the former Nawab of Chhatari, was elected the pro-Chancellor. Syed Zillur Rahman was elected honorary treasurer. On 17 May 2017, Tariq Mansoor assumed office as the 39th vice-chancellor of the university. Naima Khatoon is the current vice-chancellor of the university.

=== Faculties ===
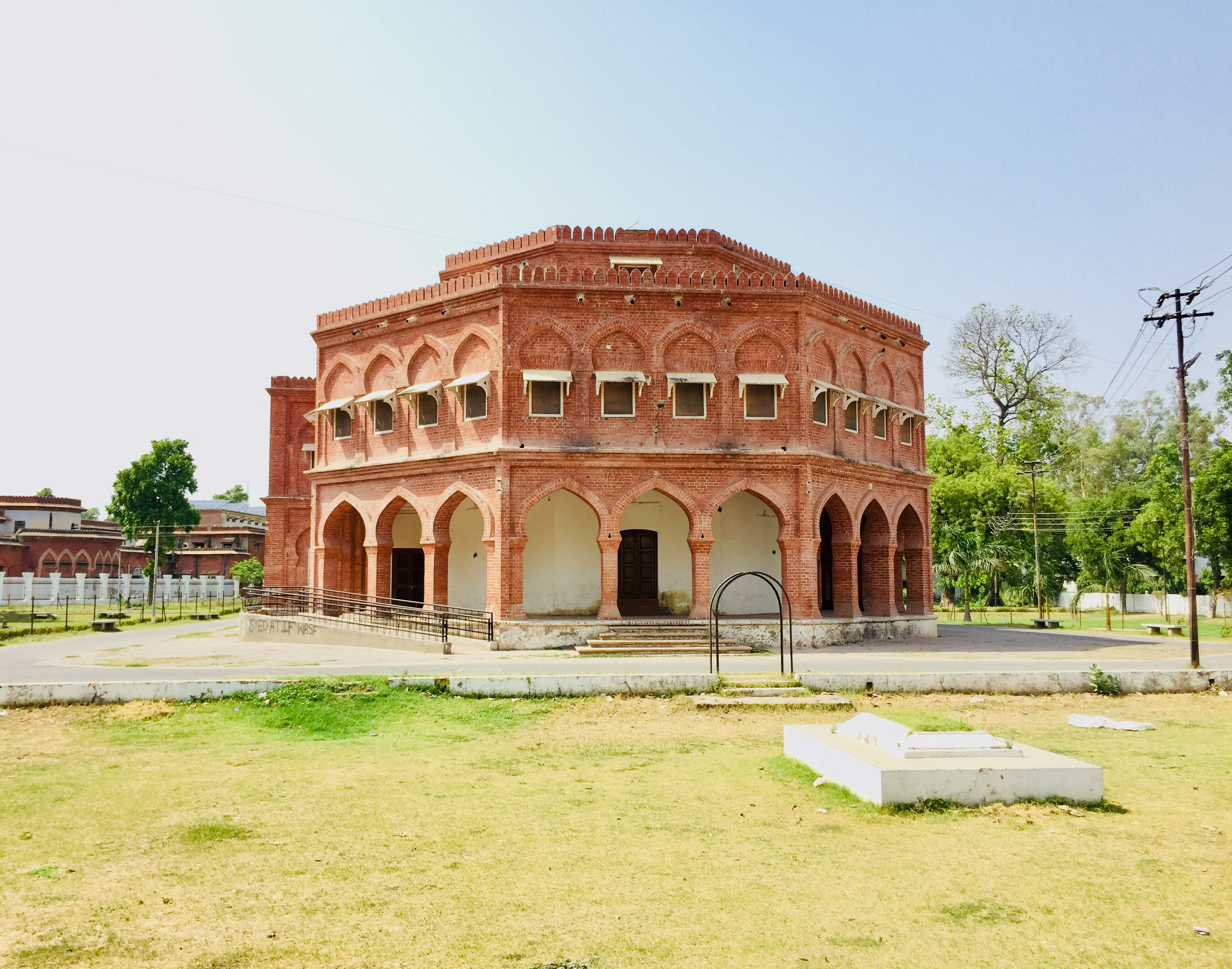
Student Union Hall, Aligarh Muslim University

Aligarh Muslim University's academic departments are divided into 13 faculties:

- Faculty of Agricultural Sciences
- Faculty of Arts
- Faculty of Commerce
- Faculty of Engineering and Technology
- Faculty of Law
- Faculty of Life Sciences
- Faculty of Medicine
- Faculty of Management Studies and Research
- Faculty of Science
- Faculty of Social Sciences
- Faculty of Theology
- Faculty of International Studies
- Faculty of Unani Medicine

=== Colleges ===
Aligarh Muslim University maintains 7 colleges:

- Academic Staff College
- Ajmal Khan Tibbiya College
- Community College
- Jawaharlal Nehru Medical College
- Women's College
- Zakir Hussain College of Engineering & Technology
- Ziauddin Ahmad Dental College

The university also maintains 15 centres, 3 institutes, and 10 schools, including Minto Circle and the Ahmadi School for the Visually Challenged. The university's Faculty of Theology has two departments, one for the Shi'a school of thought and another for the Sunni school of thought.

=== Centres ===
Aligarh Muslim University has established three centres at Malappuram (Kerala), Murshidabad (West Bengal) and Kishanganj (Bihar), while a site has been identified for Aurangabad (Maharashtra) centre.

- Aligarh Muslim University Malappuram Centre, Kerala
- Aligarh Muslim University: Murshidabad Centre, West Bengal
- Aligarh Muslim University: Kishanganj Centre, Bihar

== Academics ==
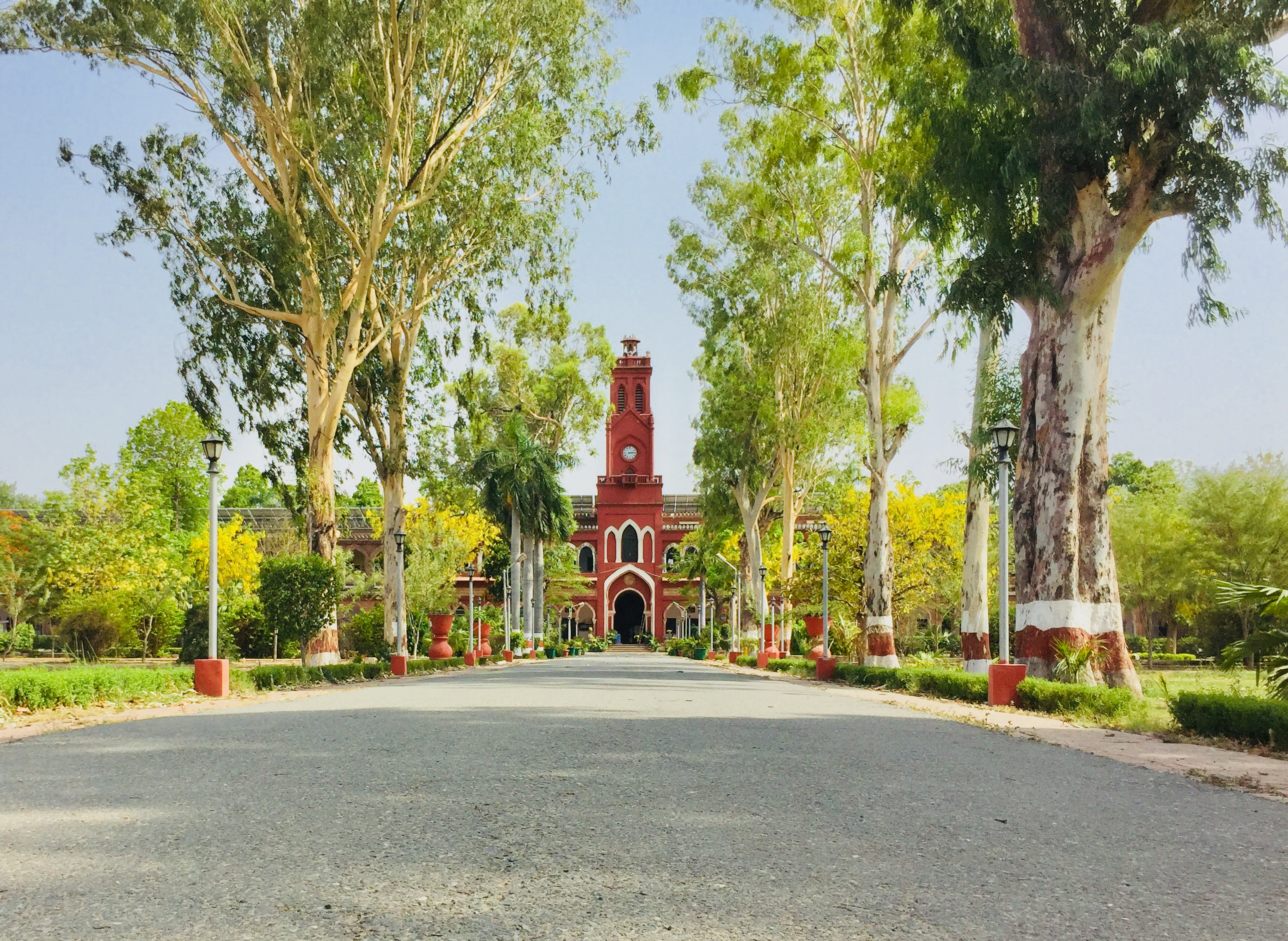
Hostel, Aligarh Muslim University, Aligarh

=== Courses ===
Aligarh Muslim University offers over 300 degrees and is organised around 12 faculties offering courses in a range of technical and vocational subjects as well as interdisciplinary subjects. In 2011, it opened two new centres in West Bengal and Kerala for the study of MBAs and Integrated Law. The university has around 28,000 students and a faculty of almost 1,500 teaching staff. Students are drawn from all states in India and several different countries, with most of its international students coming from Africa, West Asia and Southeast Asia. Admission into the university is entrance-test based.

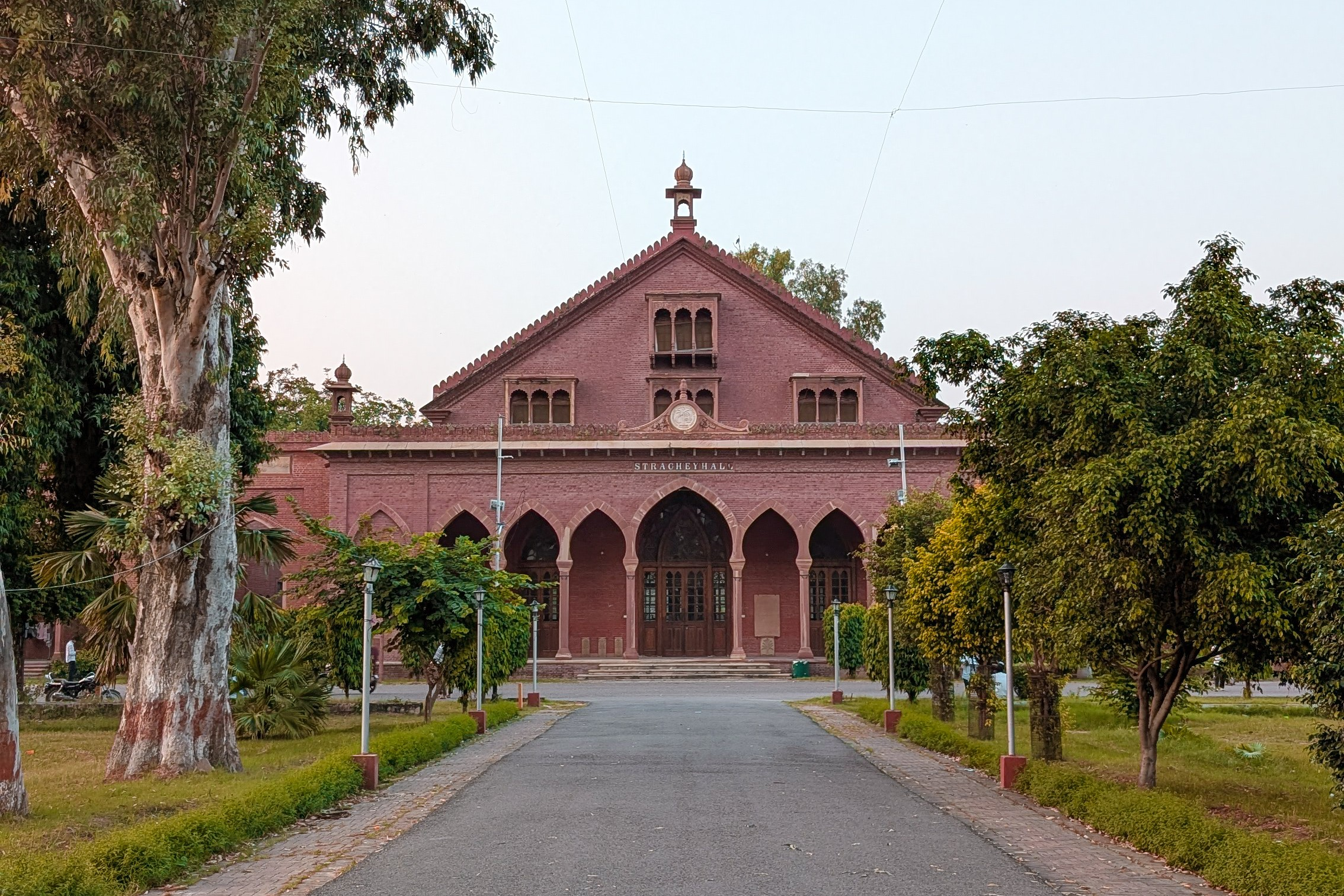
Strachey Hall, Aligarh Muslim University, India

=== Rankings ===
University and College rankings

General – international
- ARWU (2022): 801–900
- QS (World) (2023): 1001–1200
- QS (Asia) (2023): 271–280
- Times (World) (2024): 601-800
- Times (Asia) (2024): 193
- Times (Emerging) (2022): 251–300

General – India
- NIRF (Overall) (2024): 16
- NIRF (Research) (2024): 25
- NIRF (Universities) (2024): 8

Engineering – India
- NIRF (2024): 33

Medical – India
- NIRF (2024): 27

Law – India
- NIRF (2024): 12

Business/Management – India
- NIRF (2024): 70

Architecture – India
- NIRF (2024): 14

Dental – India
- NIRF (2024): 18

Internationally, AMU was ranked 1001–1200 in the QS World University Rankings of 2023 and 271–280 in Asia. It was ranked 801–1000 in the world by the Times Higher Education World University Rankings of 2023, 201–250 in Asia in 2022 and 251–300 among emerging economies. AMU was also ranked 901–1000 in the Academic Ranking of World Universities of 2022.

In India, AMU was ranked 16th overall by the National Institutional Ranking Framework (NIRF) in 2024 and 8th among universities.

Among government engineering colleges, the Zakir Hussain College of Engineering and Technology, the engineering college of the university, was ranked 33rd by the National Institutional Ranking Framework among engineering colleges in 2024.

The Jawaharlal Nehru Medical College, the medical school of the university, has been ranked 28th by National Institutional Ranking Framework in 2023.

=== Libraries ===
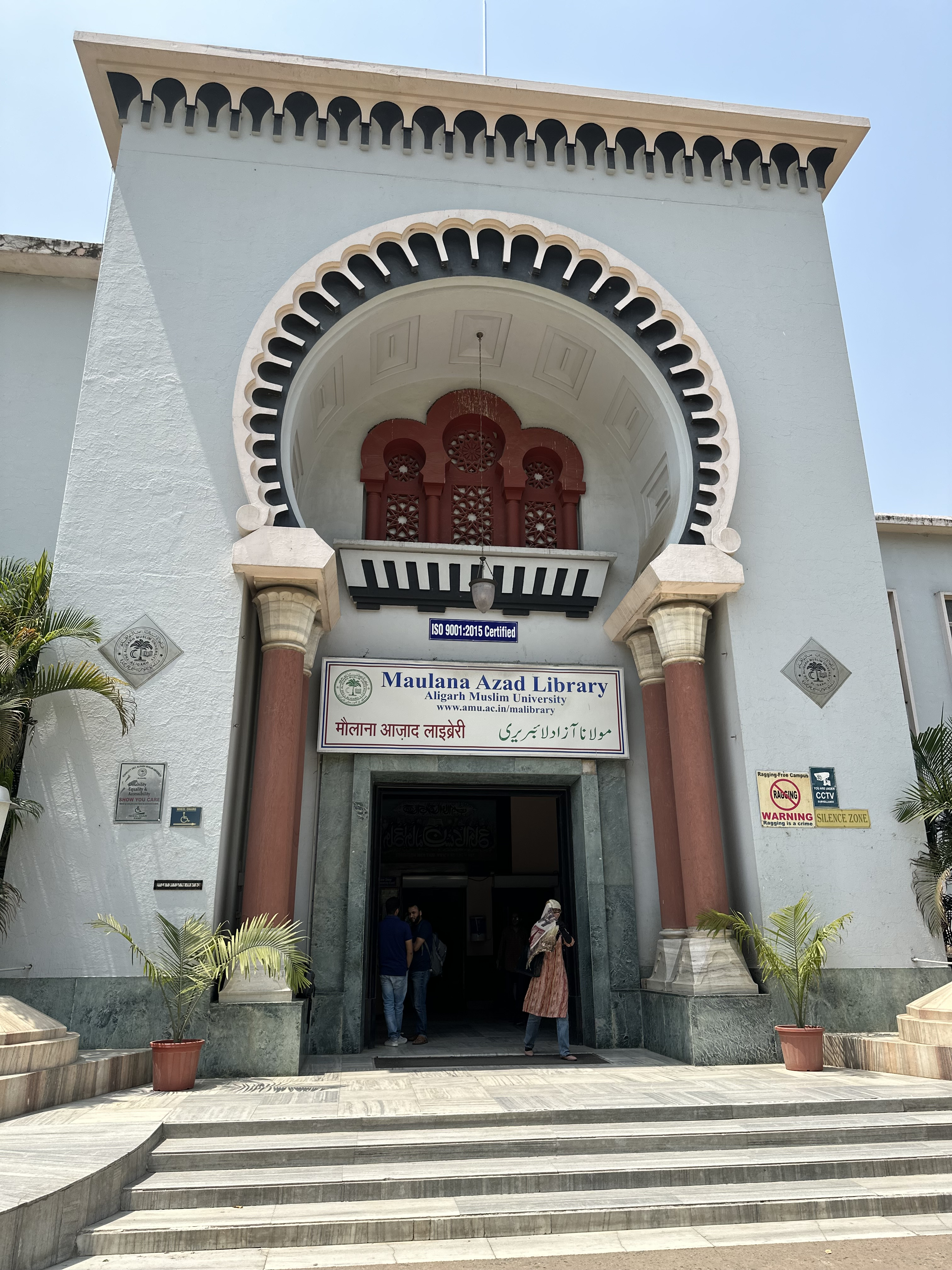
Maulana Azad Library, AMU

The Maulana Azad Library is the primary library of the university, consisting of a central library and over 100 departmental and college libraries. It houses royal decrees of Mughal emperors such as Babur, Akbar and Shah Jahan. The foundation of the library was laid in 1877 at the time of establishment of the Mohammedan Anglo-Oriental College by Robert Bulwer-Lytton, 1st Earl of Lytton, then viceroy of India, and it was named after him as Lytton Library. The present seven-storied building was inaugurated by Jawaharlal Nehru, the first prime Minister of independent India, in 1960; and the library was named after Abul Kalam Azad, popularly known as Maulana Azad, the first education minister of the independent India.

The social science cyber library was inaugurated by Pranab Mukherjee, then President of India, on 27 December 2013. In 2015, it was accredited with the International Organization for Standardization certification.

=== Satellite Project ===
The AMU Robo Club in November 2021 started working on the university's first satellite project. The project "SS AMU SAT" named after the university's founder Sir Syed Ahmed Khan, was submitted to Indian National Space Promotion and Authorization Centre (IN-SPACe) for its approval in January 2023. IN-SPACe approved the project on 28 October 2023.

== Student life ==
=== Traditions ===
Sherwani is worn by male students of the university and is a traditional attire of the university. It is required to be worn during official programs. The university provides sherwanis at a subsidised price. In early 2013, Zameer Uddin Shah, the then Vice-Chancellor of the university, insisted that male students have to wear sherwani if they wanted to meet him.

The AMU Tarana, or anthem, was composed by poet and university student Majaz. It is an abridged version of Majaz's 1933 poem "Nazr-e-Aligarh". In 1955, Khan Ishtiaq Mohammad, a university student, composed the song and it was adopted as the official anthem of the university. The song is played during every function at the university along with the National Anthem.

Dhaba culture and the campus canteen are popular among students in the evening, with tea being the preferred beverage for many students.

=== Students' Union ===
Aligarh Muslim University Students' Union (AMUSU) is the university-wide representative body for students at the university. It is an elected body.

=== Clubs and societies ===
The university has sports and cultural clubs functioning under its aegis. The Siddons Union Club was the debating club of the university. It was established in the year 1884 and was named after Henry George Impey Siddons, the first principal of the MAO college. It has hosted politicians, writers, Nobel laureates, players and journalists, including the Dalai Lama, Mahatma Gandhi, Abul Kalam Azad and Jawaharlal Nehru.Sporting clubs include the Cricket Club, Aligarh Muslim University and the Muslim University Riding Club.

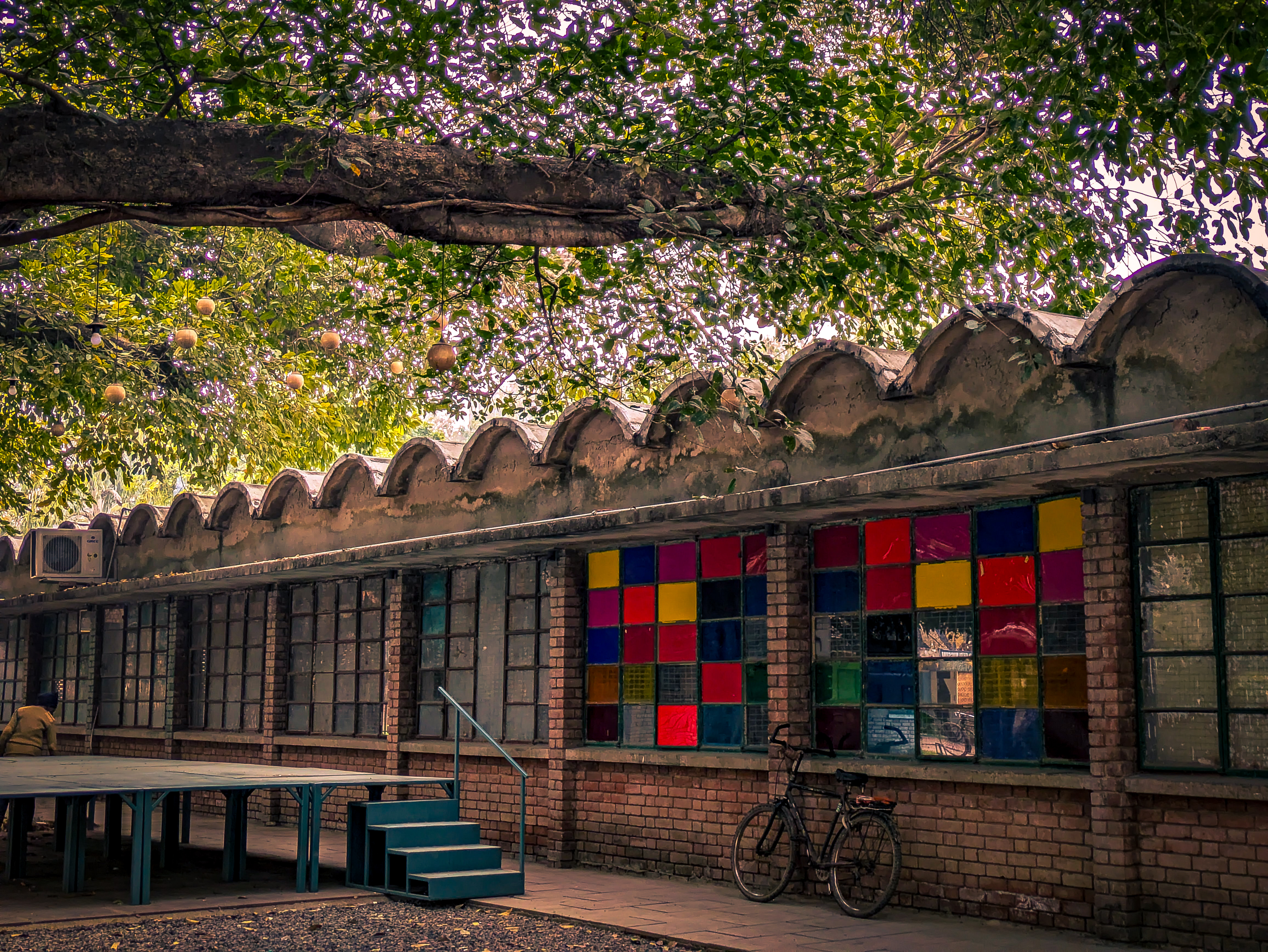
Cultural Education Centre, Aligarh Muslim University

The Cultural Education Centre of the University hosts clubs run by teachers and students jointly for imparting various skills in the students, such as the Drama club, the University and Debating Club, formerly known as the Literary Club, the Club for Short Evening Courses, the Film Club, the Music Club, the Eco Club, and the Fine Arts Club. The Raleigh Literary Society, department of English of the university hosts competitive events, plays, and performances, including performances of Shakespeare's plays. The society is named after Shakespeare critic Sir Walter Raleigh, who served as the English professor at the Mohammedan Anglo-Oriental College from 1885 to 1887.

The Law Society of the Department of Law was founded in 1894 as a non-profit student organisation. The society publishes law reviews and organises events, both academic and social, from annual fest to freshers social and farewell party for final year students.

=== Cultural festivals ===
Every year the various clubs of the university organise their own cultural festivals. Two notable fests are the University Film Club's Filmsaaz and the Literary Club's AMU Literary Festival.

=== Old Boys' Association ===
Old Boys' Association is the alumni network of the university. It was established in the year 1898 and has had statutory recognition under AMU, Act 1920.

== Notable alumni and faculty ==
Following is a list of alumni of the university.

- Alumni from the field of literature and cinema include Syed Mujtaba Ali,
- Alumni from the field of politics include Maulvi Syed Tufail Ahmad Manglori, Indian independence activist and historian; Zakir Husain, third president of India; Mohammad Hamid Ansari, twelfth vice-president of India; Arif Mohammad Khan, twenty-second governor of Kerala; Anwara Taimur the first and yet only female chief minister of the Indian state of Assam; Sheikh Abdullah and Mufti Mohammad Sayeed, respectively third and sixth chief minister of the Indian state of Jammu and Kashmir;
- Alumni from the field of science include Bushra Ateeq.
- Alumni from the field of sports include Dhyan Chand, Lala Amarnath and Zafar Iqbal and Iranian footballers Majid Bishkar and Jamshid Nassiri.
- Other notable alumni include Indian historian Mohammad Habib, French mathematician André Weil,
- Yasin Mazhar Siddiqi – Muslim scholar and historian who served as director of the Institute of Islamic Studies
- Kafeel Ahmad Qasmi – former chairman of the department of Arabic and former dean of the faculty of arts, AMU

== In popular culture ==
- The 1963 film Mere Mehboob, directed by H. S. Rawail starring Rajendra Kumar, Sadhana, and Ashok Kumar, was shot on the campus.
- The 1966 film Nai Umar Ki Nai Fasal was also filmed on the campus.
- The 2015 film Aligarh portrays the struggles faced by Ramchandra Siras, a homosexual professor from the university.

== See also ==
- Indian Institute of Information Technology, Allahabad
- Indian Institute of Information Technology
- Indian Institute of Technology
- Muslim women in science and technology
- Aligarh Muslim University Students' Union
