= List of chancellors and vice-chancellors of Aligarh Muslim University =

The chancellor of Aligarh Muslim University is the ceremonial head of the university. The vice-chancellor of Aligarh Muslim University is the executive head of the university.

== Chancellors of AMU ==
The chancellors of AMU are as follows.

No	Name	Portrait	Tenure
1	Sultan Jahan Begum; Begum of Bhopal		December 1920 – May 1930
2	Hamidullah Khan; Nawab of Bhopal		September 1930 – April 1935
3	Mir Osman Ali Khan; Nizam of Hyderabad		August 1935 – November 1947
4	Syed Raza Ali Khan; Nawab of Rampur		November 1947 – January 1953
5	Taher Saifuddin; 51st Dā'ī al-Mutlaq of the Dawoodi Bohra		April 1953 – April 1965
6	Hafiz Ahmad Saeed Khan; Nawab of Chhatari		December 1965 – January 1982
7	Akhlaqur Rahman Kidwai		Aug. 1984 – July 1992
8	A. M. Khusro		July 1992 – August 1995
9	Hakim Abdul Hameed		August 1996 – August 1999
10	Mohammed Burhanuddin; 52nd Dā'ī al-Mutlaq of the Dawoodi Bohra		August 1999 – October 2002
11	Aziz Mushabber Ahmadi former Chief Justice of India		(September 2003 – 13 September 2006, January 2007 – January 2010)
12	Mufaddal Saifuddin; 53rd Dā'ī al-Mutlaq of the Dawoodi Bohra		April 2015 – present

== Pro-Chancellors of AMU ==
The Pro-Chancellors of AMU are as follows.

No	Name	Portrait	Tenure
1	Aga Khan III; H.H. Sir Sultan Muhammad Shah		December 1920 – May 1930

== Vice-Chancellors of AMU ==
The vice-chancellors of AMU are as follows.

No.	Name	Image	Term of office		Refs
No.	Name	Image	Assumed office	Left office	Refs
1	Mohammad Ali Mohammad Khan		1 December 1920	28 February 1923	
–	Nawab Mohammad Muzammilullah Khan Sherwani (acting)		12 March 1923	31 December 1923	
2	Sahibzada Aftab Ahmad Khan		1 January 1924	31 December 1926	
3	Nawab Mohammad Muzammilullah Khan Sherwani		1 January 1927	8 February 1929	
–	Sir Shah Muhammad Sulaiman (acting)		9 February 1929	19 October 1929	
4	Ross Masood		20 October 1929	30 April 1934	
5	Ziauddin Ahmad		19 April 1935	29 April 1938	
6	Sir Shah Mohammad Sulaiman		30 April 1938	13 March 1941	
(5)	Ziauddin Ahmad		24 April 1941	26 December 1946	
–	Khan Bahadur Obaidur Rahman Khan Sherwani (acting)		27 December 1946	19 April 1947	
7	Zahid Husain		20 April 1947	7 August 1947	
–	Khan Bahadur Obaidur Rahman Khan Sherwani (acting)		8 August 1947	16 October 1947	
8	Nawab Mohammad Ismail Khan		17 October 1947	28 November 1948	
9	Zakir Husain		30 November 1948	15 September 1956	
10	Bashir Hussain Zaidi		7 October 1956	6 November 1962	
11	Badruddin Tyabji		7 November 1962	28 February 1965	
12	Ali Yavar Jung		1 March 1965	5 January 1968	
13	Abdul Aleem		6 January 1968	3 January 1974	
–	Khaliq Ahmad Nizami (acting)		3 January 1974	30 August 1974	
–	Harbans Lal Sharma (acting)		30 August 1974	20 December 1974	
14	A. M. Khusro		20 December 1974	14 December 1979	
–	Mohammad Shafi (acting)		14 December 1979	May 1980	
–	Jagan Nath Prasad (acting)		May 1980	June 1980	
–	Qamar-ul-Hasan Faruqi (acting)		June 1980	12 June 1980	
15	Saiyid Hamid		12 June 1980	26 March 1985	
–	K. M. Bahauddin (acting)		26 March 1985	7 April 1985	
16	Syed Hasim Ali		8 April 1985	4 October 1989	
–	Wasi-ur-Rahman (acting)		4 October 1989	5 July 1990	
–	Ashok Bal (acting)		6 July 1990	31 August 1990	
–	Mohammad Zaheer (acting)		1 September 1990	3 September 1990	
–	Zillur-Rehman (acting)		4 September 1990	15 October 1990	
17	M. N. Faruqui		15 October 1990	14 December 1994	
18	Mahmoodur Rahman		May 1995	27 May 2000	
19	Mohammad Hamid Ansari		28 May 2000	30 March 2002	
–	Mohammad Saleemuddin (acting)		30 March 2002	30 April 2002	
20	Naseem Ahmad		May 2002	April 2007	
21	P. K. Abdul Aziz		June 2007	January 2012	
22	Zameer Uddin Shah		May 2012	May 2017	
23	Tariq Mansoor		May 2017	2 April 2023	
_	Mohammad Gulrez(acting)		2 April 2023	23 April 2024	
24	Naima Khatoon		24 April 2024	Incumbent	

== Cited Sources ==
- Jaleel, Shahid (2004). The Aligarh movement, a chapter in the history of Indian education (phd thesis). Aligarh Muslim University.
