= Nawab Khair Andesh Khan =

Son of Nawab Muhabbat Khan

Nawab Khair Andesh Khan Kamboh, born Abu Muhammed Khan Kamboh (died 1710) was a son of Nawab Muhabbat Khan. He was the most noted member of the illustrious family of the Kamboh Nawabs of Meerut and flourished during the reign of Shah Jehan and Aurangzeb.

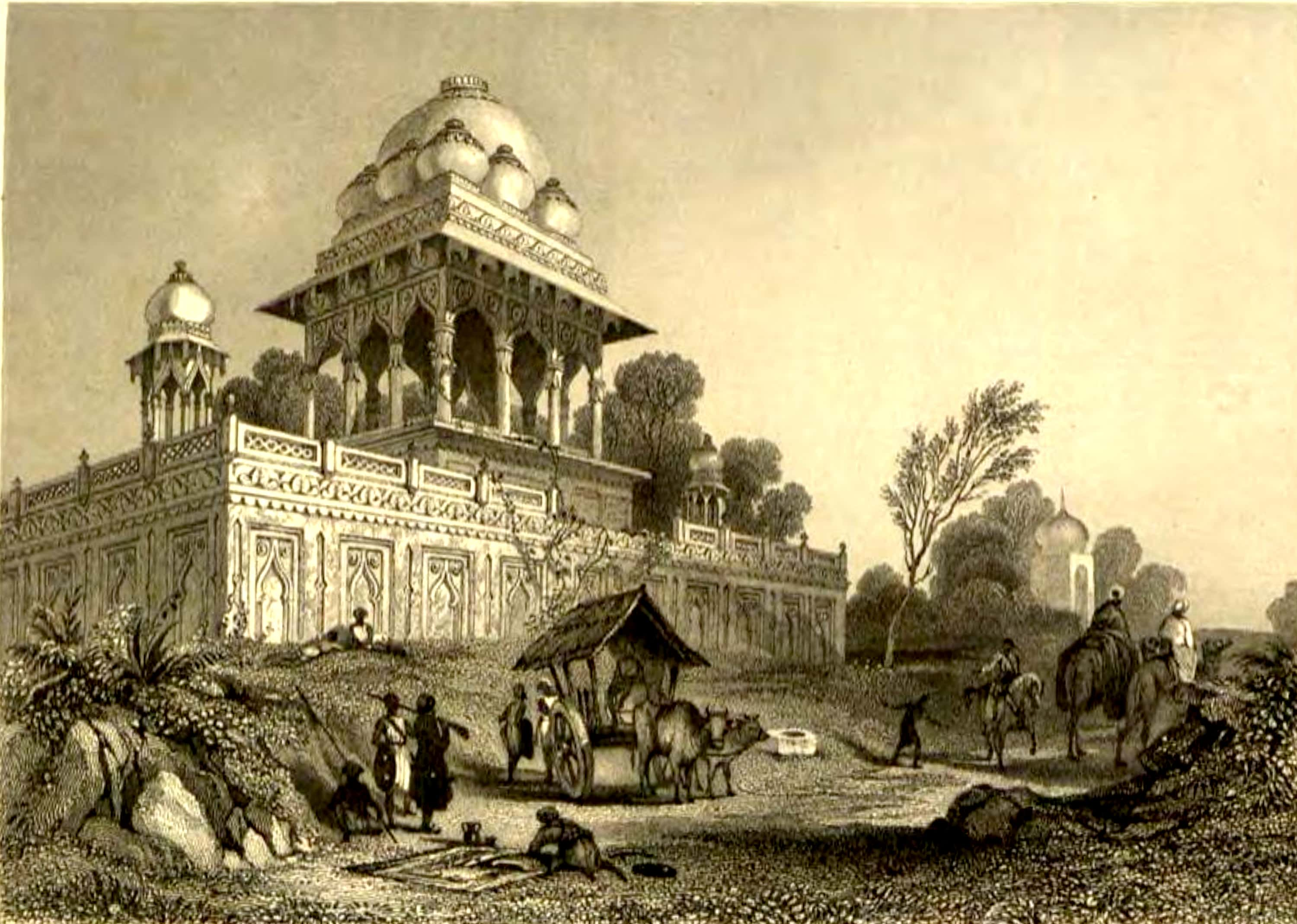
Tomb of Abu Muhammed Khan Kamboh, the Nawab of Meerut and a minister at the court of Aurangzeb, constructed in 1688. Painting by T. C. Dibdin, c. 1850.

After Dara Shikoh was assassinated, he joined Aurangzeb's administration. With competency, hard work and his loyalty to the Crown, he got a mansab of 5000 horsemen and was also awarded the title of Kheir Andesh Khan during reign of Mughal emperor Aurangzeb. He was also given an award of 0.7 million Darham for his meritorious military service as Faujdar at Etawah. During Bahadur Shah’s reign, his mansab was upgraded to 6000 horsemen

Nawab Khair Andesh Khan Kamboh built the Khairnagar Gate and Fort in the city of Meerut. He also built a fine Mosque called Kheir-ul-Masjid wald Muahib in 1691 AD. He also founded Khairandesh Pur in Etawah and gave his own name to Mohallas in Etawah and Delhi. He had been governor of Katehr (Rohilkhand), Bihar, Etawah, Bengal, Kalabagh and Hamuiri at different times of his life. He was given some land on which he built his residence, and called it Kothi Jannat Nishan. His descendants expanded on it to accommodate the combined family.

His one son, Nawab Khair Andesh Khan Sani alias Muhammad Maish held five thousand manasab and the title of Nek Andesh Khan under Mughal Emperor Aurangzeb and also a six thousand mansab and a title of Khair Andesh Khan under Emperor Bahadur Shah. He built Khair Nagar in Bareilly and also built one Idgah, one Mubarak palace and many other buildings in Khair Nagar.

His second son Nawab Khairiyat Andesh Khan also held a mansab of five thousand and remained governor of Kashmir where he constructed a Bazar known as Nawab Bazar.

His third son received title of Khair Andesh Khan Salas under Mughal Emperor Ahmad Shah and also held the governorship of Kashmir.

== See also ==
- Hasan Mahmudi Kamboh
- Muslim Kamboh
