= Muhammad Yamin Khan =

Sir Muhammad Yamin Khan (Urdu: محمد یامین خان; born June 1888) CIE was a barrister-at-law, statesman and politician in the period before the partition of India. Khan served as a parliamentarian and one of the senior most members of the All India Muslim League.

== Biography ==
Muhammad Yamin Khan was born in 1888 into the prominent Kamboh Nawab family of Meerut. He was appointed as a member of the Municipal Board of Meerut in 1918 and served it as Vice-Chairman and Chairman for a long time. The Chairmanship of the Meerut Municipal Board remained for the first half century of its existence with the Nawab family of the Meerut Kambohs.

The British Government recognized him for his outstanding social and legal services by appointing him a Companion of the Order of the Indian Empire (CIE) in the 1931 Birthday Honours list, and knighting him in the 1936 New Year Honours list. Muhammad Yamin Khan was the second Kamboh member to be knighted, and also was the second Kamboh member of the Indian Parliament (M.P.). He also presided over the third "Kamboh Conference" held in Bareilly in 1936. Yamin Khan was prominent in raising the Indianisation debate in the Central Legislature in which he demanded the admission of increasing numbers of Indians to the officer corps of the British Indian Army.

Muhammad Yamin Khan was a close confidant of Quaid-e-Azam. He was a member of the working committee of All India Muslim League. He also remained Deputy President of the Central Legislative Assembly. After the independence of Pakistan in 1947, Khan moved with his family to Karachi, Pakistan where he soon died.

== See also ==
- Muslim Kamboh
- Nawab Sir Ziauddin Ahmad
- Nawab Waqar-ul-Mulk Kamboh
