= Kamboh Nawabs of Meerut =

Meerut-based Punjabi Muslim family

Kamboh Nawabs of Meerut were an influential family based in Meerut during the Mughal and British colonial period.

== History ==
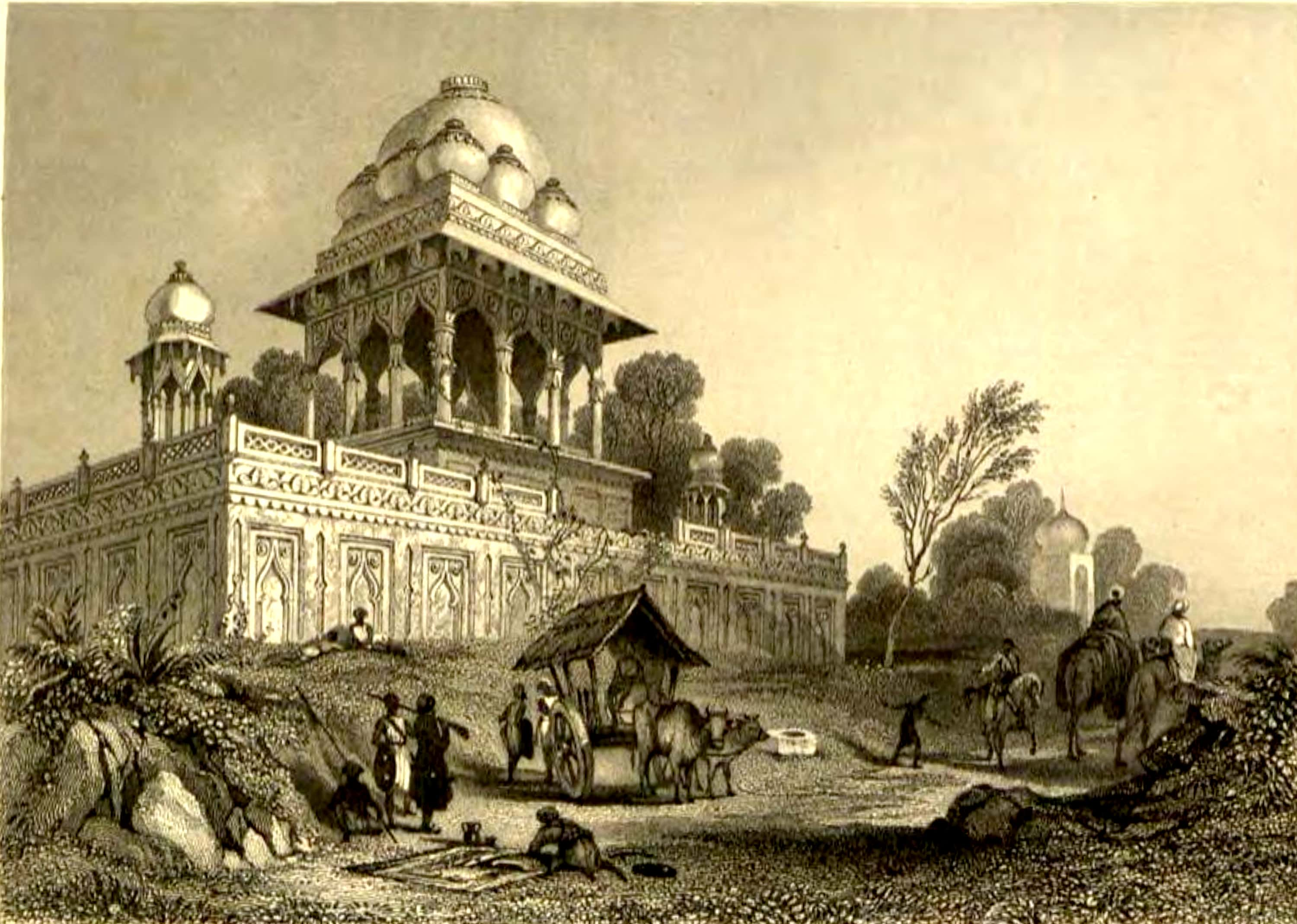
Tomb of Abu Muhammed Khan Kamboh, the Nawab of Meerut and a minister at the court of Aurangzeb, constructed in 1688. Painting by T. C. Dibdin, c. 1850.

The Kamboh Nawabs of Meerut trace their ancestry from Shahbaz Khan Kamboh (c. 1529–1599), a prominent Punjabi Muslim noble in the court of Akbar, through Nawab Mohabbat Khan Kamboh who is credited with the construction of Mohabbat Khan Mosque in Peshawar. His son Nawab Muhammed Khan, the progenitor of the family, arrived to the region as faujdar of Etawah in the 17th century. He flourished during the eras of Aurangzeb and Bahadur Shah I, and fortified Meerut in c. 1696. After his death in 1710, he was succeeded by Muhammed Fazel Khan and grandson Muhammed Masih Khan.

The family had been firmly established in the cities of Marehra, Amroha, Bareilly and Meerut in western Uttar Pradesh by the 18th century, and was disassociated with their kins in Punjab. It remained prominent after the decline of Mughal power well into the British colonial period, with the politics of Meerut being dominated by the Kamboh Nawabs until 1947. Several of its members played an active role in the Aligarh and Pakistans movements, including Muhammad Yamin Khan, Nawab Waqar-ul-Mulk and his nephew, Ziauddin Ahmad. After the partition of British India, most of the family migrated to Pakistan.

== Sources ==
- Lelyveld, David (1975). "Three Aligarh Students: Aftab Ahmad Khan, Ziauddin Ahmad and Muhammad Ali". Modern Asian Studies. 9 (2): 227–240. ISSN 0026-749X.
- Chatterjee, Nandini (2021). "Opening up family collections: Discovery of three 18th-century legal documents from the Nawab family of Kamboh, near Meerut, north India". Lawforms. doi:10.58079/qqw5.
- Ahmed, Dr Mukhtar; Goswami, Heena (2022). "Nawab Khair Andesh Khan: A polymath of Mughal period". International Journal of History. 4 (1). University of Delhi: 100–106. ISSN 2706-9117.
