= Thomas Dibdin =

Thomas Dibdin may refer to:

- Thomas Frognall Dibdin (1776–1847), English bibliographer
- Thomas John Dibdin (1771–1841), English dramatist and songwriter
- Thomas Colman Dibdin (1810–1893), English water colour artist and teacher
