= P. K. Abdul Aziz =

Academic and Scientist from India

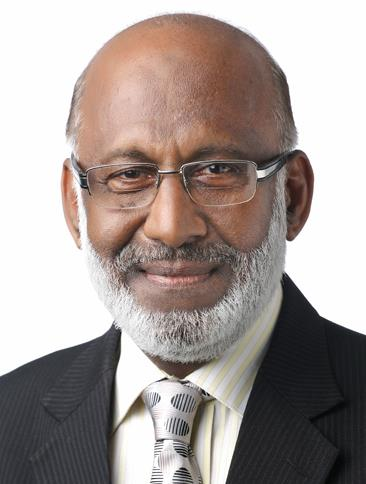
- Born: 18 January 1947 (age 79); Thodupuzha, Kerala, India
- Education: D.Sc (Doctor of Science), PhD – University of Kerala; Masters – Cochin University of Science and Technology
- Alma mater: University of Kerala; Cochin University of Science and Technology; St. Albert's College, Ernakulam; Union Christian College, Aluva
- Occupations: Former Vice Chancellor at University of Science and Technology Meghalaya, Aligarh Muslim University and Cochin University of Science and Technology

P.K. Abdul Aziz (born 18 January 1947), also known as P. K. Abdul Azis, is a scientist in ecology and biodiversity and an academic from India who has published 77 research papers,. He has been the Vice-Chancellor of Cochin University of Science and Technology and Aligarh Muslim University. He is also the former Vice-Chancellor of the University of Science and Technology Meghalaya. He is also the chairman of the Expert Committee for Revision of Curriculum for School Education, appointed by the Kerala government.

== Early education and career ==
He received a D.Sc in Ecology (2002) and a PhD (1978) from the Department of Aquatic Biology & Fisheries, University of Kerala.

He led the Department of Ecology and Marine Biology at the Saline Water Conversion Corporation Research and Development Centre, Saudi Arabia as chairman during 1993–2002.

He was a professor at Kerala University and Kerala Agricultural University before becoming Vice-Chancellor of the Cochin University of Science and Technology.

He was the Vice-Chancellor of Aligarh Muslim University from 11 June 2007, to 17 January 2012. During his term he initiated a "crackdown" against squatters and put into place ID cards for all students. The university also signed MoUs with Wisconsin University, Cleveland University, Atlanta University, Johns Hopkins University and New York University and began clearing a backlog of PhD submissions. India Today cited his efforts as leading to a "remarkable turnaround" for the university.

== Vice-Chancellorship ==
Prof Azis first served as the Vice Chancellor of Cochin University of Science and Technology (CUSAT) from 2004 - 2007. During his tenure, he initiated a plan to upgrade CUSAT to the status of IIEST (Indian Institute of Engineering Science and Technology), but the project could not materialise due to a lack of understanding with the successive state governments and eventually, had to be shelved.

Prof. Azis then served as the Vice Chancellor of Aligarh Muslim University (AMU) from 2007 - 2012. He was widely credited with bringing a turnaround in the academic fortunes of the university and got AMU to the 5th spot in the India Today rankings. He was instrumental and the key initiator in the launching of AMU centres in Murshidabad (West Bengal), Malapparum (Kerala) and Kishanganj (Bihar). The former President of India and the then Finance Minister Shri. Pranab Mukherjee announced the launch of the centres in his 2009 Budget speech. The AMU Malappuram Centre has been functioning since 2010, AMU Murshidabad centre has been functioning since March 6, 2011 and AMU Kishanganj Centre was inaugurated in January 2014 by UPA Chairperson Smt. Sonia Gandhi.

During his tenure as VC of AMU, Prof Azis courted controversy, and was under the CBI scanner for alleged financial impropriety related to 'travel concession for family, income tax payment from University funds and purchase of luxury cars". He was later cleared of all charges by the CBI with submission of its closure report at the Patiala House Court. Abdul Aziz's departure was cited by India Today as evidence of the "waning influence" of the "Malayali lobby" in Delhi. At the end of his term, Aziz said he had "no regrets" about the decisions he had made during his tenure at the university.

Academic offices
Preceded by Naseem Ahmad	Vice-Chancellor of AMU; 2007-2012	Succeeded by Zameerud-din Shah
