= Faruqui =

Faruqui is a surname. Notable people with the surname include:

- Ahmad Faruqui (born 1953), Pakistani defense analyst and economist
- Mohammad Naseem Faruqui (died 2012), Indian academic administrator
- Munawar Faruqui (born 1992), Indian stand-up comedian
- Naseer Ahmad Faruqui (1906–1991), Pakistani civil servant
- Sharmila Faruqui (born 1978), Pakistani politician

== See also ==
- Farooqui
