= Our Lady of Fatima Senior Secondary School, Aligarh =

Our Lady of Fatima Senior Secondary School

Location
- Ramghat Road, Aligarh, Uttar Pradesh; India; 27.88°N 78.08°E

Information
- Type: Private
- Motto: Absorb and Radiate
- Established: 1961
- Principal: Sister Jyotsana (2016-present)
- Grades: [LKG] – Class 12
- Campus type: Non-residential
- Affiliation: CBSE
- Website: www.ourladyfatima.org

Our Lady of Fatima Senior Secondary School is a Catholic school in Aligarh, Uttar Pradesh, India affiliated from the Central Board of Secondary Education (CBSE Board) located at Ramghat Road, Aligarh. It was established in 1961, and was the first English medium school in Aligarh. It is managed by Catholic nuns of the Franciscan Sisters of St. Mary of the Angels (F.S.M.A) order. The school runs a program for educating underprivileged children in the evenings.

== History ==
The school began in 1961 on the suggestion of Dominic Athaide, the Archbishop of Agra. Sister Stanislaus, a founding member, rented four rooms in a house to conduct classes. As demand for admission grew, the founding sisters using a loan from the diocese and personal funds purchased land on Ramghat Road for construction of the current school site, to which the school relocated in 1967. In that year, Sister Stanislaus was made the first principal.

The school attained provincial affiliation with CBSE in 1969, which became permanent in 1978. The first batch of students to clear standard X examination was in 1971. Tariq Mansoor, MLC, was one of the 13 students in the second batch to pass out in 1972.

For most of its history the school educated students till standard X. In 2018, the school received CBSE approval to teach standard XI and XII courses as well.

In 2020, the school received media coverage for waiving fees for two months due to the COVID-19 pandemic. In 2021, the school celebrated its 60th anniversary by opening a garden gym facility.

== Academics ==
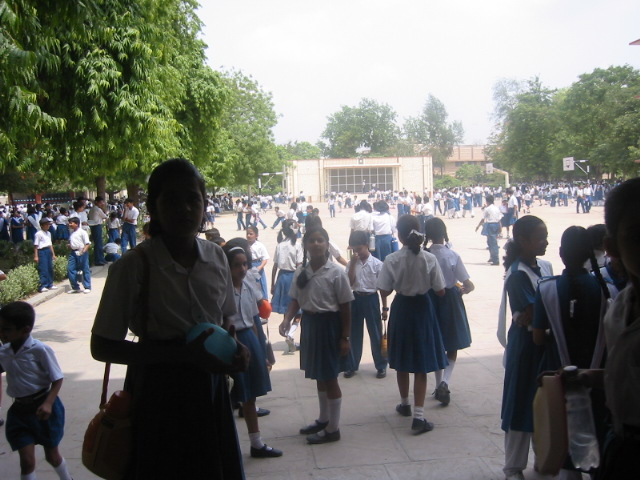
Students during lunch break.

The school follows the CBSE curriculum, and offers courses in Mathematics, English, Hindi and Urdu or Sanskrit as third language (in Classes VI to VIII), Social studies (history, civics, geography, economics), Science (physics, chemistry, biology), and Art. Other subjects include computer science, moral science and physical health education.

The school has a strong academic reputation in the region. A number of its students were placed among the top ten rank holders in the district for the 10th and 12th board examinations in 2023.

== Subject of Research Studies ==
The school has been the subject of several scientific and sociological studies. In 1983, students were studied to evaluate factors that affect academic performance. Researchers at Aligarh Muslim University, also in 1983, studied the school to understand sociological differences between co-educational schools and single-sex schools within an Indian context. Another study at the Aligarh Muslim University studied the effect of the principal's leadership style on teacher morale. In 2019, the school students participated in a study analysing the impact of violent gaming on child welfare.

== Notable alumni ==
- Tariq Mansoor, former Vice-Chancellor of AMU, and member of Uttar Pradesh Legislative Council

== See also ==
- Our Lady of Fatima
- List of schools in Aligarh
