= Mehmoodur Rehman =

Indian civil servant

Mehmood-ur Rehman
- Born: Bilanda, Fatehpur District, Uttar Pradesh
- Died: 9 July 2017; Lucknow
- Education: Allahabad University
- Occupation: Civil servant
- Spouse(s): Nuzhat Rahman, Afshan Rahman
- Children: Zarqa Rahman, Zia ur Rahman Moiz Rahman Monis Rahman
- Awards: Padma Shri

Mehmood-ur Rehman (Mahmoodur Rehman or Mehmood-ur-Rehman) was an Indian civil servant, best known as the chairman of the 2008 Committee on Socio-Economic Backwardness of Muslims in Maharashtra. He was Vice-Chancellor of Aligarh Muslim University from 1995 to 2000 and served as the chairman of Bombay Mercantile Co-operative Bank.

== Education ==
He graduated in Law in 1962 and secured a master's degree in Persian from Allahabad University before joining the Uttar Pradesh civil services in 1965.

Other training included:

- Diploma in Agriculture Extension from International Training Institute NSW, Australia in 1977.
- Conferred D. Litt (Honoris Causa) by Banaras Hindu University for outstanding administrative skills and invaluable contribution towards the cause of education.

== Civil service ==
A year after joining the civil service, he was selected to the Indian Administrative Service and served as the Assistant Commissioner in Anantnag District, Jammu and Kashmir during 1967–68. He also served as Sub Divisional Magistrate, Deputy Planning Secretary, Additional Deputy Commissioner, Deputy Commissioner, Development Commissioner, Ladakh and Agriculture Commissioner and Secretary. During his tenure as the Development Commissioner of Ladakh, he is reported to have introduced the Karakul sheep to the region. When the Vilas Rao Deshmukh ministry of Maharashtra decided to set up a committee to propose recommendations for the betterment of the socio-economic and educational conditions of the Muslim community, Rehman was selected to chair the committee. The committee stressed the social and educational backwardness of the Muslims and, after 16 months, submitted its report proposing 8 percent reservation for the community. His contributions are also reported behind the establishment of the Jammu and Kashmir Agriculture University and the Horticulture Processing and Marketing Corporation (HPMC).

=== Administrative positions ===
While in the civil service he held the posts of:

- Assistant Commissioner in Anantnag District of Kashmir in J & K, July 1967 to June 1968.
- Sub Divisional Magistrate – June 1968 to July 1969 in Sopore in Kashmir.
- Deputy Secretary to Government in the Planning Department in J & K from July 1969 to March 1970.
- Additional Deputy Commissioner, Jammu from March 1970 to April 1971.
- Deputy Commissioner, Udhampur from April 1971 to April 1973.
- Deputy Commissioner and Development Commissioner, Ladakh from April 1973 to October 1976. While there, he introduced Karakul Sheep of Russian Origin into Ladakh.
- Commissioner and Secretary Agriculture, Department of Agriculture, JK. In this role, he establishes the Agriculture University of JK and for this conducted study tour at Thailand, Malaysia, Australia and New Zealand. He established the Horticulture Processing and Marketing Corporation (HPMC) and worked achieving self-sufficiency in food grains production in J & K. Visiting the US on the invitation of World Bank in March 1978, he negotiated a loan of 22 million dollars for horticulture development in J & K. He visited Australia on a course in Agriculture Extension and Lectures in NSW and Perth in Australia.
- Held the first Panchyat Election in J & K in 1978.
- Secretary Industries, Government of Jammu & Kashmir and also headed group of Industrial Undertaking and made them profit earning.
- Secretary (Health), Government of Jammu & Kashmir and worked on the expansion of Family Welfare Programme.
- Secretary (Revenue), Government of Jammu & Kashmir.
- Commissioner, Planning and Development, Jammu & Kashmir and started a number of power development projects.
- Principal Secretary to Chief Minister with additional powers of Special Secretary to Cabinet
- Held posts including that the Chairmanship of J & K Cements Ltd., Jammu & Kashmir Minerals and the Himalayan Wool Chambers

In the capacity as Principal Secretary, also held charge of the Department of Trade, Agencies, Tourism, Parks & Garden and Hospitality and Protocol. He was also:

- Additional Chief Secretary, Industries, Commerce and Power Development.
- Additional Chief Secretary (Home), Government of Jammu & Kashmir from December 1989 to April 1995.

== Aligarh Muslim University ==
During his tenure as the Vice Chancellor of the Aligarh Muslim University (1995 to 2000), he was appreciated for timely start of academic sessions and reviving the campus mess system. He was also appreciated for ending the possibility of corruption in the selection process for various courses of the university, by personally supervising the entire process and reducing the time taken in result declaration by up to 95% in some cases, thereby eliminating the scope of corruption. In a historic step, he also ended interview process for courses like Engineering to cater to the wide spread allegations of selective admissions based on communal lines, in past. Rehman is also credited to give AMU its First woman Proctor since the establishment of the varsity, by making Dr. Shad Bano Ahmad, a professor in Sociology at AMU, as proctor from 1996 to 1999. Being tough on the criminal elements present in the university, he also received criticism for pulling out a revolver at protesting students and was termed as "more a general than a scholar" by India Today.

== Later career ==
After his time as Vice Chancellor, he was:

- Secretary to Government of India, Ministry of Parliamentary Affair from September 2000 to August 2002.
- Administrator, Punjab Wakf Board, from August 2002 to October 2003.
- Member, Central Wakf Council, August 2002 to October 2003.

He was also a member of:

- Central POTA Review Committee, since May 2003;
- Exec. Council of the University of Hyderabad;
- Maulana Azad National Urdu University (MANU);
- Board of Governors, IIM Indore;
- Padma Award Committee, Ministry of Home Affairs, New Delhi.

== Achievements ==
- Worked on rehabilitation of Tibetan Refugees in the difficult climatic conditions of Ladakh and travelled extensively into Ladakh, Himachal and Siachin Glacier.
- Established new rehabilitation centres of Tibetan Refugees after holding discussions and obtaining approval of the Dalai Lama.
- In November 1991 worked on the release of Indian Oil Official, Shri K. Doraiswami and Miss Nahid Soz, D/o Prof. Saifuddin Soz, former Minister of Environment, Government of India.
- Worked as the Chief Negotiator of the Government of J & K in the peaceful resolution of Hazratbal crisis in Kashmir in November 1993.
- In Ladhakh a programme of systematic preservation and promotion of Buddhist culture and relics was initiated. This has been acknowledged by all noted scholars including Professor David Snellgrove in his book "Heritage of Ladakh". Similarly, Ms. Aung San Suu Kyi of the National League of Democracy of Myanmar during her prolonged study of Ladhakh in 1975 appreciated the promotion of Ladakh as a tourist destination.
- During the initial years of service in Udhampur, remained associated with the famous Mata Vaishno Devi shrine at Udhampur District in Jammu Province and also for the first time made the proposal to construct an alternate exit route at the main shrine, providing relief to a large number of pilgrims. This exit route was made by cutting open the hill-side and this measure resulted in the increase of pilgrims from about ten lakhs to fifty lakhs in a year.
- Organised Amarnath Yatra twice in 1967 and 1968 in which on account of proper management no casualties took place.
- As Incharge of Home in Jammu & Kashmir continued to organise Amarnath Yatra in the most turbulent days from 1990 to 1995.
- Worked as Chairman of the Board of Translation of the Urdu Biography of Dr. Zakir Hussain and personally translated 200 pages.
- As member of Central Prevention of Terrorism Act (POTA) delivered a number of orders as per the Act and proposed a number of amendments to the existing provisions.
- As the present Chairman and Administrator of Bombay Mercantile Co-op. Bank Ltd. since 16 August 2002 contributed to the growth of the Bank and earned unprecedented profit of Rs. 37 crores in 2003 and Rs. 41 crores in 2004. The Bank is now making steady progress.
- Chairman of the Search Committees for the Vice-Chancellors of: i. Dharwad Agriculture University, Dharwad in 1997. ii. Mangalore University, Mangalore in 1998. iii. Gulbarga University, Gulbarga in 1999. iv. Kashmir University, Jammu and Kashmir in 2007 v. Islamic University of Science & Technology, J & K in January 2009 vi. Nalanda Open University Bihar, 28.4.2009

== Death ==
Mahmudur Rahman died in Lucknow on 9 July 2017. After suffering a Brain Hemorrhage.

== Awards ==
The Government of India awarded him the fourth highest civilian award of the Padma Shri, in 1991. Other awards include:

- K.G. Gold Medal from Allahabad University in 1962 for academic excellence in the entire Faculty of Arts in Allahabad University.
- Allahabad Jubilee Gold Medal (1962) for being the best student of the University.
- Queen Victoria Silver Medal (1962) for showing extraordinary merit in all the post-graduate examinations.
- Gold Medal for outstanding work for the rehabilitation of Ex-Servicemen from the Rajya Sainik Board, J & K.
- Conferred D. Litt. (Honoris Causa – BHU) in 1997.

Academic offices
Preceded by Mohammad Naseem Faruqui	Vice-Chancellor of AMU; 1995-2000	Succeeded by Mohammad Hamid Ansari
