= List of water companies in Saudi Arabia =

This is a list of top water companies in Saudi Arabia.

Top Brand of Saudi Arabia. This List is not accurate Top of the List.

- 1st. OSKA and Ival PBIC Almarai
- 2nd. Nova
- 3rd. Watany water (مصنع مياه وطني)
- Akoya Water
- First Hada
- Nestle
- berain
- Al-Qassim
- Hana
- Dome
- Tania
- Najed
- Al Ain (Delta Agthia Manufacturing Company)
- وايت مياه شمال الرياض
- Al-Oyoun
- Dala
- Hayat
- Manahel
- Fayha
- Safa
- Mazen
- Al Manhel
- Amjad
- Nesscafe

== See also ==
- Water supply and sanitation in Saudi Arabia
