= Naseem Ahmad =

Indian civil servant

Naseem Ahmad is an Indian civil servant (Indian Administrative Service, 1972) from the Haryana Cadre and former Vice Chancellor of Aligarh Muslim University and currently, the Chairperson of National Commission for Minorities, Government of India.

servant (Indian Administrative Service, 1972) from the Haryana Cadre and former Vice Chancellor of Aligarh Muslim University and currently, the Chairperson of National Commission for Minorities, Government of India.

He is a Haryana cadre retired IAS officer of 1972 batch. Before joining IAS, he was a member of the UP Civil Service (Judicial) from Jan 1971 to Jun 1972. He also served as Vice Chancellor of AMU from 2002 to 2007.

Academic offices
Preceded by Mohammad Hamid Ansari	Vice-Chancellor of AMU; 2002-2007	Succeeded by P. K. Abdul Aziz
