= Bashir Hussain Zaidi =

Indian politician and educationist

Members of the Constituent Assembly
- In office November 1946 – 7 April 1948
- Constituency: United Provinces

Personal details
- Born: 30 July 1898
- Died: 29 March 1992
- Party: Janata Party
- Awards: Padma Vibhushan, 1976

Sayyid Bashir Hussain Zaidi, CIE, MP (30 July 1898 – 29 March 1992) was a member of the first Lok Sabha and the Vice-Chancellor of Aligarh Muslim University from 1956 to 1962. He also served as a member of the Constituent Assembly of India from United Provinces (later Uttar Pradesh). He was awarded Padma Vibhushan, the second highest civilian honour, by Government of India in 1976.

== Biography ==
Zaidi was born on 30 July 1898 in Kakrauli, a town of Muzaffarnagar district. After his schooling in Sonepat and Delhi, he was educated at St. Stephen's College, Delhi, and at Fitzwilliam College, Cambridge. After Cambridge, he was in chambers at Lincoln's Inn, where he was called to the Bar in 1923.

Zaidi returned to India in 1923. He taught at Aligarh Muslim University from 1923 to 1930, when he entered the service of the Nawab of Rampur, subsequently becoming the state's vizier or chief minister in 1936 and holding this position until Rampur merged with the Dominion of India in 1949.

A member of the Indian Constituent Assembly from 1947 to 1949, he became a member of the new Parliament in 1950 and a member of the Lok Sabha in 1952. He left Parliament in 1956 to become Vice-Chancellor of Aligarh Muslim University, returning as a member of the Rajya Sabha in 1964. From 1967 to 1969, he served on the Indian Committee of Inquiry on Communal Disturbances; also leading a goodwill mission to nine African and Asian nations in 1964 and heading the Indian cultural delegation to Afghanistan in 1965 for its Independence Week celebrations.

Zaidi retired from politics in 1970, continuing to serve as director of several industrial concerns and a publishing house until 1977.

== Awards and honours ==
Zaidi was appointed a CIE (Companion of the Order of the Indian Empire in 1941.

He served as a member of the governing committees of Zakir Husain College from 1974 and Aligarh from 1983.

He was awarded an honorary D.Litt. from Aligarh Muslim University in 1964 and from Kanpur University in 1974.

In 1976, he received the Padma Vibhushan, India's second highest civilian honour.[2]

== Personal life ==
In 1937, Zaidi married Qudsia Abdullah (d. 1960). They had two sons and a daughter, the screenwriter and costume designer Shama Zaidi.

Zaidi died at his secondary home, Zaidi Villa, at Jamia Nagar, New Delhi on 29 March 1992, aged 93.

Academic offices
Preceded by Zakir Husain	Vice-Chancellor of AMU; 1956–1962	Succeeded by Badruddin Taiyabji
