= Ziauddin Ahmad =

Indian mathematician and philosopher (1873–1947)

Ziauddin Ahmed
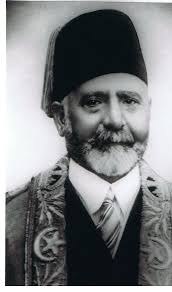
- Sir Ziauddin at Aligarh Muslim University
- Born: Ziauddin Ahmed Zuberi; 13 February 1873; Meerut, North-Western Provinces, British India
- Died: 23 December 1947 (aged 74); London, England
- Resting place: Aligarh Muslim University's Mosque
- Citizenship: British India (1873–1947)
- Education: Muhammadan Anglo-Oriental College; Allahabad University; Calcutta University; Cambridge University; University of Göttingen; University of Bologna; Al-Azhar University; Royal Astronomical Society; Patna University
- Known for: As a politician, was a member of British Indian Parliament, Muslim Renaissance activist, Aligarh Movement, Sadler Commission or Calcutta University Commission on higher education, Reserve Bank of India Act. Had leading and central role in the Pakistan Movement. As a mathematician, did research work on Differential geometry, Projective geometry, Logarithmic applications and sciences, and Algebraic geometry and analytic geometry.
- Awards: Strachey Gold Medal (1895); Sir Isaac Newton Scholarship; Lang Medal; CIE
- Scientific career
- Fields: Mathematics; Parliamentarian; Social reformer
- Workplaces: London Mathematical Society; Royal Astronomical Society; Muhammadan Anglo-Oriental College; Aligarh Muslim University; Trinity College, Cambridge; University of Paris; University of Bologna
- Doctoral advisor: Dr. James Reynold

Notes
- First general secretary of the Muslim League, and close companion of Muhammad Ali Jinnah, Moti Lal Nehru, B.R. Ambedkar.

Sir Ziauddin Ahmad (born Ziauddin Ahmed Zuberi; 13 February 1873 – 23 December 1947) was an Indian mathematician, parliamentarian, logician, natural philosopher, politician, political theorist, educationist and a scholar. He was a member of the Aligarh Movement and was a professor, principal of MAO College, first pro vice-chancellor, vice chancellor and rector of Aligarh Muslim University, India.

He served as vice chancellor of Aligarh Muslim University for three terms. In 1917, he was appointed a member of the Calcutta University Commission also known as the Sadler Commission. He was also a member of Skeen Committee also known as Indian Sandhurst Committee and Shea Commission for the Indianisation of the British Indian Army.

== Early life and academic career ==
=== Family background ===
Ziauddin Ahmad was born on 13 February 1873, into the prominent Kamboh Nawab family of Meerut, Uttar Pradesh, British India. Born to Hafiz Muinuddin, a junior employee in the district of collectorate, Ziauddin was related to the influential Muslim political figure Waqar-ul-Mulk.

=== Education ===
His primary education was at a madrasa and later joined Muhammadan Anglo-Oriental College, Aligarh.

Ahmad's association with Aligarh began in 1889, when at the age of 16 years, he joined the 'first year' at the M.A.O. College School. He passed high school in first division and was awarded the Lang Medal and a government scholarship.

He had to join the Government College, Allahabad, as science courses were not available at Muhammadan Anglo-Oriental College. He returned to Aligarh and passed his B.A in 1895 in first division, standing first among science students, and was awarded Starchy Gold Medal. Soon after passing B.A., he was appointed assistant lecturer in mathematics at Muhammadan Anglo-Oriental College.

On the basis of merit, he was nominated for the post of deputy collector, but Ahmad declined the offer and elected to continue in the service of the college. Sir Syed offered him a permanent appointment in the grade of Rs 60-100, provided he signed a bond to serve for a period of five years. He responded by undertaking to serve for his entire life. A highly impressed Sir Syed tore up the bond.

Ahmad completed his BA in mathematics (with distinction) from Muhammadan Anglo-Oriental College in 1895. He was the first Muslim to obtain a D.Sc. (Mathematics), from Allahabad University. His field was complex logarithms applications. He published in differential geometry and algebraic geometry. He won the Lytton Strachey Gold Medal in 1897. While teaching, he continued his education and earned M.A. degrees from Calcutta and Allahabad Universities and also a D.Sc. degree from the University of Allahabad in 1901.

In 1901, Ahmad left for England on a government scholarship and obtained his honours degree in mathematics from Cambridge University. He was awarded the Isaac Newton Scholarship in 1904, the first Indian awardee becoming the first Indian to secure this coveted honour. He became a Wrangler He was elected a Fellow of the Royal Astronomical Society and London Mathematical Society. Thereafter He joined the Gointtingen University in Germany in 1904 and received a PhD from the University of Göttingen, Germany. He visited University of Paris and University of Bologna, Italy for advanced studies in modern geometry. He did research in astronomy in Bologna, Italy. He visited Al Azhar University, Cairo to understand their academic methodologies.

=== Professor ===
On his return to India in 1907, Ahmad joined his alma mater. In 1911, he was appointed secretary of the AMU Foundation and Constitution Committees. He became a professor of history at Muhammadan Anglo-Oriental College and in 1918 was selected principal. He was appointed a Companion of the Order of the Indian Empire (CIE) in King's Birthday Honours list.

He coached students who were seeking admission at Roorkie Engineering College. He held seminars and coached students in engineering and forestry.

Ahmad paid to bring students to Muhammadan Anglo-Oriental College. One of the most notable was Hasrat Mohani, who hailed from Kanpur and was planning to go to Lucknow. Ahmad noticed Mohani's math talent and went to Kanpur to convince him and his family to attend MAO College.

He was appointed assistant master in MAO College and served as Acting Principal for a time in 1913.

Along with Professor Chakravarti, Ahmad cofounded the first group of researchers focused on Astronomy, History of Mathematics and Theory of Functions. They made innovations in teaching and other discoveries.

In 1890, MAO College Mathematics Society was formed with him as president and A.M. Kureishy as secretary. The society continues as Aligarh Mathematical Society. The Department of Mathematics was founded when MAO College was given the status of a residential University in 1920, becoming one of its oldest departments. Ahmad was the first professor and head of the department.

Principal of the College Beck and Sir Morrison proposed that Ahmad be appointed Deputy Collector with UP Government, which paid Rs. 500/-. He declined the offer in favor of a position as assistant lecturer at the college making Rs. 60/- per month. Khan offered Ahmad a five-year contract, but Ahmad told him that he planned to spend his life there and that anyone who would stay only to complete a contract would not be worth keeping. Khan tore up the contract and Ahmad's career as a teacher began. To keep his promise to Khan, he left the Indian Civil Service.

Ahmad also taught other subjects. For example, in 1897, Professor Arnold, who taught logic, resigned. The budget did not have room for a faculty member from England and so Ahmad took over.

=== Sadler Commission ===
At the time of the Government of India Resolution in 1913 five universities operated in India. Colleges were outside the control of the various universities. At this time London University was reorganised per recommendations of the Royal Commission. A decision to reform Indian Universities led to a second university commission, the 1917 Calcutta University Commission. The members of the commission were Sir Ziauddin, Dr. Gregory, Ramsay Muir, Sir Hartog, Dr. Horniel and Sir Asutosh Mukerji.

At the time of the Government of India Resolution in 1913 there were only five universities in India and the number of colleges was beyond the control of the various universities within their territorial limits. As a result, different administrative problems piled up in that period. Sir Asutosh Mukherji was the vice chancellor of Calcutta University. He started imparting post-graduate education in the university in 1916 as recommended by the University Education Commission of 1902. This has attracted the attention of the Government. By this time the London University was reorganised and reformed as per recommendations of the Royal Commission under the chairmanship of Lord Halden. Therefore, it became a necessity to reform the Indian Universities also. All these circumstances led to the formation of the second university commission. i.e., Calcutta University Commission, 1917.

The commission reviewed the entire field from school education to university education. The Sadler Commission held the view that improved secondary education was a necessary condition for the improvement of university education.

=== Indianisation of officer ranks of British Indian Army ===
The British Government of India appointed the Indian Sandhurst Committee also known as Skeen Committee in March 1925 with the objective of reform and Indianisation of British Indian Army. This committee was consisted of Lt.General Sir Andrew Skeen who was the then Chief of General Staff of India as chairman, and 12 Indian of Military and civil stature as its member. Sir Ziauddin along with Motilal Nehru, M.A.Jinnah, Sardar Jogendra Singh, Sir Phiroze Sethna, Ramachandra Rao, Sahibzada Abdul Qaiyum, Capt. Hira Singh, Capt. J.N. Banerjee, Major Thaku Zorawar Singh were its members. This committee met for the first time in Shimla and quickly decided upon its working. It studied French, American, Canadian, British military system and submitted its report within 6 months. The committee recommended the opening of a Military college in India at Dehradoon which later become Indian Military Academy.

== Aligarh Muslim University ==
In 1911, a Central Committee was set up to transform MAO College into a university, with Raja Sahib Mahmudabad, India as president, Syed Ali Bilgrami as secretary and Ahmad as joint secretary. The college had to raise Rs. 30 lakh (3 million) for elevation to university status, which was achieved in 1915. The student body at that time was less than 1500. Ahmad traveled across India to raise funds.

He established most of the departments of AMU. He collected funds to open a Medical College at AMU, which later became Jawaharlal Nehru Medical College (JNMC). He drafted the new university's Constitution.

The university named its dental college after Ziauddin Ahmad. He founded the Commerce and Polytechnic Departments and several other departments. On his recommendation Abdullah School merged with Aligarh Muslim University (AMU).

=== Vice Chancellor ===
He became AMU's first pro-vice-chancellor. He was elected vice-chancellor in 1934, remaining until 1946, becoming its longest serving VC. He became an honorary professor in the department of Mathematics, working simultaneously as vice-chancellor. Because of his love for the subject, he taught courses both at undergraduate and postgraduate levels. He was AMU's only teaching VC.

With his help, Islamia College was established in Lahore, now called Government Islamia College, Lahore. Ahmad laid the foundation stone for the college and for Islamia College, Peshawar.

=== Students ===
He recommended students for all kinds of employment, ranging from clerical and administrative to military. Ahmad visited students in their dormitories and mediated sometimes violent student disputes. Habib A. Zuberi, who was also Ahmad's student, writes, "In 1946-47, when I was a student in Xth class at M.U. High School,...he lectured us either once or twice a week....He was a fine teacher. His goal was to include Trigonometry in High School curriculum." Ahmad encouraged informal relations between faculty and students. The university emphasized sports and had a Riding School, a unit of U.O.T.C., and an active Student Union, where students elected their leaders and participated in debates.

When the British hung the father of Pir Pagara, Pir Sabghatullah Shah Rashidi, on 20 March 1943, and abolished his Gaddi (Spiritual Office), Pir Pagara Syed Shah Mardan Shah-II was hardly 15 years old. During the same year Ahmad, at that time AMU vice-chancellor, took him and his brother to Aligarh. At Aligarh the brothers stayed in 'English House', a hostel established to house the sons of nawabs and rajas. In 1946 Ahmad arranged for their education in England.

He was known for throwing parties, often entertaining visiting dignitaries at his house. He often invited people for dinner with ever-swelling guest lists.

=== Khilafat movement ===
In 1920, Indian Muslims, led by Maulana Mohammad Ali Jouhar and his brother Maulana Shaukat Ali, launched a movement to restore the Khilafat (caliphate) in Turkey. The Turks themselves had no use for the Khilafat and had chosen Mustafa Kemal Pasha as their leader; the Arabs did not want it and the British opposed it. The Congress party supported their efforts and on 9 September 1920, passed a resolution which began the non-cooperation movement. This movement was hailed as a symbol of Hindu-Muslim unity in India.

On 11 October 1920, the Ali brothers visited Aligarh with Swami Satya Dev and Gandhiji. These leaders were invited to address the MAO College Student Union. The students passed a resolution in support of non-cooperation with the British government, condemned the British attitude towards Turkey, demanded that the college accept no grants from the government and discontinue affiliation with Allahabad University. Furthermore, the resolution asked to change MAO College into a National University independent of the government.

Ahmad had accepted Khan Ahmed Khan's thesis that Muslims should not get involved in politics until reaching educational parity with other Indian communities. He approached the university authorities, and convinced them to keep the college out of this struggle. When the crisis deepened, he closed the college and sent the students home.

Ahmad made great efforts to bring about reconciliation between the members of the board of trustees, and succeeded in bringing most students back to campus. In honor of Ahmad, who was now known as Doctor Sahib, the faculty and staff on campus gave a dinner to which college trustees as well as British officers of Aligarh and Agra were invited. Khawaja Abdul Majeed, one of the trustees who did not support him initially, stated: "I was against Dr. Sahib’s appointment as Principal, but the improvements that have resulted under his leadership have convinced me that this will be good for the future of students, staff, honorary Secretary, public and the relations with the government."

Ahmad had opposed a popular movement and risked alienating the Muslim masses. He had to choose between supporting a popular movement and losing government support (financial and otherwise) or establishing a Muslim University with government assistance.

When classes resumed, a sizeable number of students stayed home. It appeared that the sharp decline in enrollment the college would cost the college its elevation. Dr. Sahib visited several towns and convince most of the students to return, while new students enrolled. However, Ahmad earned the wrath of people who continued to oppose him thereafter. At the same time, he found a solid base that supported him.

=== Elevation ===
On 1 December 1920, the Muslim University Act passed, and thus MAO College became Aligarh Muslim University. Raja Mahmudabad became the first vice-chancellor and Ahmad, pro-vice-chancellor. Raja Sahib was not particularly in favor of Dr. Sahib becoming the PVC, instead preferring an Englishman. When no European was willing to accept this position and no other capable Muslim was available, he accepted Ahmad. The University Act stated that the PVC would become "the principal academic officer of the university." It was further stipulated that in the absence of the vice chancellor the PVC would act as the chairman of the Academic Council. Dr. Sahib and Raja Sahib often held differing views on managing university affairs. After a year, Raja Sahib resigned and Nawabzada Aftab Ahmed Khan became the V.C. In 1922, Dr. Sahib was re-elected to the State Assembly.

=== Sahibzada Aftab Ahmed Khan ===
Fundamental disagreements developed between Sahibzada Aftab Ahmed Khan and Dr. Sahib. Sahibzada was a lawyer and was a stickler for rules and regulations, while Dr. Sahib maintained that "rules are made for students; students are not made for rules." Dr. Amir Husain Siddiqui stated, "Dr. Ahmad created educational aids, reduced fees and other expenditure, relaxed the rules for admission and examinations and encouraged extra lectures for those who fell short of attendance.". These policies made him popular among students and parents. He introduced a system of private examinations, because the government did not permit the affiliation of colleges and schools to the university. It was not clear whether students could appear in exams as private candidates, but he continued this practice while pro-vice-chancellor.

In 1925, the university administration celebrated the Golden Jubilee of the foundation of Aligarh College. At this time differences between the VC and the PVC surfaced. Dr. Sahib decided to take a leave and asked the VC to appoint a replacement. Sahibzada refused his request and prevailed upon him to continue as PVC.

The Jubilee was celebrated on a grand scale, and raised Rs 176,000/-. Dr. Sahib reserved these funds for the establishment of an Engineering College and Departments of Applied Physics and Applied Chemistry. However, by law the university was required to obtain permission from the government and the effort was unsuccessful.

=== Resignation ===
In February 1926, Dr. Sahib's term as PVC ended and with Sahibzada Sahib recommendation began another term. However, when Sahibzada's own term as VC ended in December 1926, the trustees appointed Nawab Sir Muzzamil Ullah Khan in his place. Before leaving Sahibzada wrote a pamphlet pointing out irregularities for which he held Dr. Sahib responsible. He sent a copy to the Viceroy, to Begum Bhopal (Chancellor) and to the trustees. Moin-ul-Haque, who was on the History Department faculty, claimed that Dr. Sahib was willing to break rules to aid students in graduating and finding work.

The pamphlet resulted in the formation of an inquiry committee. The committee expressed appreciation of Dr. Sahib services, but recommended that he take a six-month paid leave with pay and then retire. Before the University Court could meet to discuss the issue, Dr. Sahib submitted his resignation, to take effect from 27 April 1928, declining the offer of leave with pay. Farewell parties produced poems in his honor. One staff member, Qazi Jalal Uddin, wrote a two-page poem.

The vice-president of the Student Union, in his farewell address, stated: "If Khan was the founder of this institution, you are beyond a question its savior." After 33 years, Ahmad left Aligarh on 27 April 1928. According to Zia-i-Hayat, almost the entire student body came to bid him farewell at the railway station.

=== New colleges ===
Seven years after he had left Aligarh, Ahmad returned to the University on 19 April 1935, as vice-chancellor. He immediately made plans to improve the Science Faculty. Although plans for a building for Tibbiya College had been discussed earlier, Dr. Sahib moved to make it a reality. The work was completed in 1940. At that time Sir Shah Sulaiman was serving as vice chancellor. Dr. Sahib next launched a program to establish an Institute of Technology. Nawab of Jungadh donated Rs 50,000/- to this program. Nawab Muzzamil Ullah Khan donated his Johnson Factory Building to the effort along with two of his old cars, so that students enrolled in the motor engineering course could work on them.

In 1937, Ahmad proposed a College of Technology to prepare students for work in electrical, mechanical, sanitary and civil engineering and agriculture. Other related subjects included applied chemistry, electro-chemistry, and textile chemistry. In the same year, the Technology workshop opened. Its foundation stone was laid by Nawab Sahib of Rampur.

In 1937, Girls Intermediate College became a Degree College and affiliated with the university. At the same time, upon Ahmad's recommendation, for the first time, girls were admitted to their Teachers Training College.

Dr. Sahib also proposed a military college.

His first term ended on 30 April 1938. He was succeeded by Sir Shah Suleiman, a judge of the Federal Court, who then died on 13 March 1941. Ahmad was appointed vice-chancellor for the second time on 24 April 1941.

Tibbiya College became his administration's top priority. Work on the college building was completed 1943 due to scarcity of resources. His second priority was the establishment of a full-fledged Engineering College. This goal was achieved by 1945. He made an effort to establish an airport near the university in 1942. Nawab Sahib Bhopal contributed Rs 50,000/- to build an aeronautics workshop. The university acquired a plane as well, enabling students to take flying lessons. Ahmad proposed to establish a department of applied physics and to attach it to the College of Engineering.

Ahmad's second term as VC came to an end in 1943 and he was reappointed. In 1944, he proposed to establish a medical College at Aligarh, for which he collected a sum of Rs. 50 lakh (5 million) by the end of 1946. In 1945, Commerce College opened. He then began to shift his focus from career training to scholarship and the quality of education.

=== Resignation and appointment as Rector ===
In December 1946 some students spread a rumor, encouraged by his enemies, that Dr. Sahib had confiscated all copies of a magazine that reported riots in Bihar and that he was going to have its student author arrested. Between 250 and 300 students marched to the vice-chancellor's office shouting slogans, "Ahmad Must Go." Dr. Sahib remained in his office and asked student representatives what they wanted. They asked for his resignation, which he immediately resigned.

In the evening, around 500–600 students went to his house shouting, "Ahmad come back." He did not withdraw his resignation, despite the entreaties of the executive council and the court. The court unanimously passed a resolution expressing their confidence in his leadership, and recommended his appointment as rector of the university—to which he acceded.

He devoted the rest of his time to raising funds for Aligarh's medical college. M.S. Aney, Governor of Bihar, wrote about Dr. Sahib: "…Last I met him was when he came to Colombo on a deputation of the Aligarh University to collect funds for the Medical College. I believe he made handsome collections there and was received very warmly, not just by Mohammedans at Colombo, but by other communities also. I had great respect for his learning and versatility."

== Political career ==
By 1915, he was taking interest in public affairs and in technical and vocational education. He was appointed Member of the Legislative Assembly (MLA) of UP in 1919 and 1922 as representative of Allahabad University. He presided over the second Muslim Kamboh Conference held at Marehra (District Etha UP) on 21 and 22 April 1935 at Marison Islamia School.

In 1924, he was elected to the Uttar Pradesh Legislative Assembly from the Muslim Constituency of Mainpuri, Etah and Farrukhabad.

=== Central Assembly ===
He was elected a Member of the Central Assembly in 1930. He was repeatedly elected from different constituencies and served in the Central Legislature until 1947. In 1946, he was the chief whip of the Muslim League in the Central Assembly.

He was knighted in the 1938 New Year Honours list.

He sponsored the Indian Foreign Relations Act in Parliament. Ahmad worked on the budget for the Indian Railways and with the Reserve Bank of India (RBI). When RBI was founded he was involved in moving legislation for its more efficient functioning.

=== Anwer Noor ===
In 1931 Anwer Noor, in the Frontier Province, was so offended by an assistant commissioner that he attacked him. The officer was not injured, but Noor was nevertheless executed, creating a political issue. A committee was appointed to submit a report. However, the government seized the report before it was published. Ahmad stated that no harm had come to the assistant commissioner, that Noor had had no chance to appeal and that the government should say what greater punishment should follow a more serious attack. The colonial government thereafter withdrew the laws in question.

=== Aligarh Muslim University Centres ===
After the demise of Sir Syed Ahmad Khan in 1898, Sir Syed Memorial Fund was created in different parts of country and the effort for the establishment of a Muslim University was sped up. All the persons associated with this movement wanted all Muslim institutions of India to be affiliated to the Muslim University.

Dr. Sir Ziauddin, while presenting the idea of the Muslim University at Lahore session of All India Muslim Educational Conference in 1898, discussed at length the concept of a university and emphasized the importance of the right of affiliating colleges.

Ahmad moved a billentral Legislative Assembly to amend the University Act 1920 to empower AMU to recognize and affiliate Schools and Colleges outside Aligarh. However, due to empathy of British ruler towards education of Indians the bill failed. In February, 2011, this vision was realised by the opening of two Centres of Aligarh Muslim University in Mallapuram, Kerala and Murshidabad, West Bengal. In November 2013, the university opened a third satellite, in Kishanganj, Bihar.

=== Muslim League ===
Ahmad was an originally member of the Independent Party, which included Hindus, Muslims and Sikhs. When this party dissolved he joined the Muslim League and served as its Parliamentary Secretary. In evaluating his performance in the Assembly, N.V Gadgil wrote: "Dr. Ahmad Ahmed was a popular figure in the Central Assembly during the period of my membership of that body. He was very well informed on Railway and General Finance… He was catholic in his hospitality, charitable towards friends and a conscientious legislator..."

== Death ==
He was also a member of the East India Railway Company's board of directors, and the viceroy appointed him as a member of his defense council. Ahmad was knighted by the Crown. During World War II he served as a lieutenant colonel.

Ahmad left India for Europe and America in 1947. While on a plane returning from Paris to London, he suffered a stroke. The stroke was followed by pneumonia. When his condition slightly improved, he invited Aligarians living in London for tea. He advised them to go back to India upon completing their education. He even requested his physician, Ghayasuddin, to move to India. Krishna Menon, India's High Commissioner in U.K, visited Ahmad several times, as did Pakistan's high commissioner, Habib Ibrahim Rahimtoola. He died in London on 23 December 1947. His body, as he had requested, was sent back to Aligarh.

Many people visited his family. At that time Nawab Ismail Khan was serving as vice chancellor. University authorities decided that Ahmad should be buried in the university mosque. His body was brought to the Cricket Pavilion for viewing. Students overruled the administration's choice of burial site and prepared his grave next to that of Sir Syed Ahmed Khan. His tomb stone is inscribed with Allama Iqbal's couplet, "Hazarooun Saal Nargis Upni Bay Noori Pay Routi Hay Bari Mushkil Say Houta Hay Chaman Mein Deeda Were Paida."

== Family and legacy ==
Sir Ziauddin is a part of the famous Zuberi family. Sir Ziauddin's son, Zakauddin Ahmad, had three children: Anjum Zia (female), Nigaht Zia (female), and Ahmad Ziauddin (Ahmad Zia). Ahmad Ziauddin's daughter, Dr. Aijaz Fatima, co-founded a hospital in memory of her father. She has four children (two sons and two daughters), including Asim Hussain.

== Books ==
- Systems of Education: England, Germany, France and India. Calcutta, India: Longmans, Green & Co., 1929. Pp. xvi+302.

== Recognitions and awards ==
- Stratchey Gold Medal
- Tripos Wrangler in Mathematics
- Sir Isaac Newton Scholarship
- He was the secretary, Aligarh Muslim University Constitution Committee, in 1911.
- Member of Sadler Commission on Higher Education also known as Calcutta University Commission.
- Member of Skeen also known as Indian Sandhurst Committee and Shea Commission for the Indianisation of British Indian Army.
- Moved Indian Foreign Relations Act in the legislative assembly in British India
- Worked proactively to establish Reserve Bank of India and helped pass RBI Act of 1935.
- A four-storey hostel hall (dormitory hall for science and research students) is named after him Sir Ziauddin Hall at Aligarh Muslim University, in December 1982.
- Dental College is named after him at Aligarh Muslim University, India in 2003 – Dr Ziauddin Ahmad Dental College.
- Ziauddin University and Dr. Ziauddin Hospitals in Karachi, Pakistan were established by Asim Hussain in his honour.
- A major street in Karachi, Ziauddin Ahmad Road (formerly known as Kutchery Road), was named in his honour.
- Sir Ziauddin Public School at Aligarh, Uttar Pradesh, bears his name.

Academic offices
Preceded by Nawab Mohammad Ismail Khan	Vice-Chancellor of AMU; 1935-1938	Succeeded by Zahid Hussain
