= Mohammad Gulrez =

Indian academic (born 1961)

Professor Mohammad Gulrez
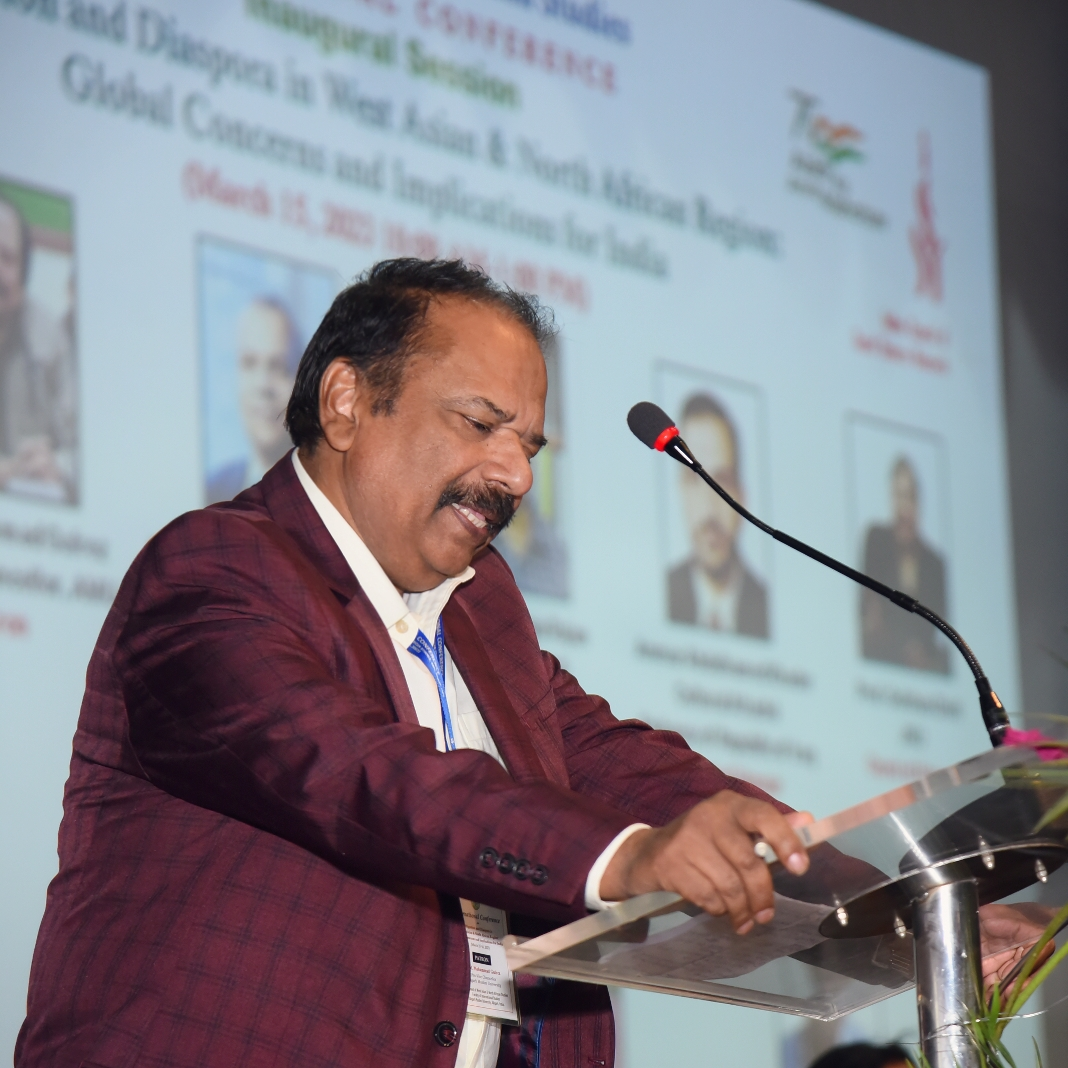
- Prof Gulrez is delivering a lecture at International Conference (14 March 2023) held at Aligarh Muslim University.

Vice Chancellor (officiating), Aligarh Muslim University
- In office 2 April 2023 – 22 April 2024
- Preceded by: Tariq Mansoor
- Succeeded by: Naima Khatoon

Pro Vice Chancellor, Aligarh Muslim University
- In office 22 June 2022 – 22 April 2024

Dean, Faculty of International Studies, Aligarh Muslim University
- In office 7 July 2019 – 6 July 2021

Director, Centre for Continuing Adult Education and Extension, Aligarh Muslim University
- In office 22 January 2018 – 30 August 2023

Visiting ICCR Professor, University of Colombo, Sri Lanka
- In office 15 July 2017 – 31 December 2017

Director, Directorate of School Education, Aligarh Muslim University
- In office 20 June 2015 – 5 May 2017

Visiting Faculty, the National University of Rwanda, Rwanda, Africa
- In office January 1999 – January 2004

Personal details
- Born: 1 July 1961 (age 65)
- Spouse: Naima Khatoon
- Education: Aligarh Muslim University
- Profession: Professor (Teaching, Research and Administration)

Mohammad Gulrez (1 July 1961) is an International Relations & Global Governance expert. He has served as Pro Vice Chancellor of Aligarh Muslim University from 22 June 2022 to 22 April 2024. Previously, on 2 April 2023, Prof Gulrez took over the charge as officiating Vice Chancellor of the Aligarh Muslim University and served there till 22 April 2024. He has also served as Dean, Faculty of International Studies, Director, Centre for South African & Brazilian Studies & Coordinator for Conflict Resolution & Peace Studies Programme at Aligarh Muslim University. Prof Gulrez was on a Deputation from Indian Council for Cultural Relations, Ministry of External Affairs, Govt of India for a period of 6 months to the India Chair at University of Colombo, Sri Lanka from July 2017 to December 2017. From January 1999 to January 2004, he worked as visiting Faculty, Department of Political and Administrative Sciences at the National University of Rwanda, Central Africa. Prof Gulrez was the Consultant/Researcher, Good Governance (Component) for the Poverty Reduction Strategy Paper (PRSP) Project, Govt. of Rwanda (2002). Prof Gulrez is also on the International Advisory Board, Asian Review Institute of Asian Studies, Chulalongkorn University, Bangkok, Thailand. He is also the Member of Academic Forum, Asia Pacific Observatory, Montevideo, Uruguay. He has also been associated with the Foreign Policy Analysis Program, Mershon Centre, Ohio State University, Columbus, Ohio and Muslim Politics Project, Council On Foreign Relations Programme, New York, United States of America.

Prof Gulrez is currently working on Confidence Building Measures focusing on both the bi-lateral and multi-lateral tracks of the peace process. Prof Gulrez has participated in seminars and workshops in USA, Iran, Pakistan, Libya, South Africa, Thailand, United Kingdom, Ghana, Senegal, Saudi Arabia, Sri Lanka, Kyrgyzstan and Kuwait.

== Specialization ==
His area of specialization is Conflict Resolution, Ethnic Conflicts, Civil Society, and Poverty Alleviation.

== Published works ==
Prof. Gulrez authored/edited seven books & monographs and published papers in the national and international referred journals. Prof. Gulrez also presented 100 (approx.) Research papers/projects National and International Seminars in India and abroad.

=== Books ===
- Conflict Transformation in West Asia - Oslo Process and Beyond: The Transcend Perspective (2004)
- Settlements and Resistance in the Occupied Territories (2005) (ed.)
- Constitutional Poll Battle : A Study of Iranian Presidential Election 2005 (2008)
- Area Studies in India : Challenges Ahead (2009) (ed.)
- Arab Spring & Prospects of Peace in West Asia (2015) (ed.)
- Rising India, China, Brazil & South Africa : Prospects and Challenges (2016) (ed.)
- Prospects of Cooperation in Higher Education & Capacity Building : A Case Study of India and Sri Lanka (2017)
