= Asim Hussain =

Pakistani Businessman

Asim Hussain SI NI
- عاصم حسین
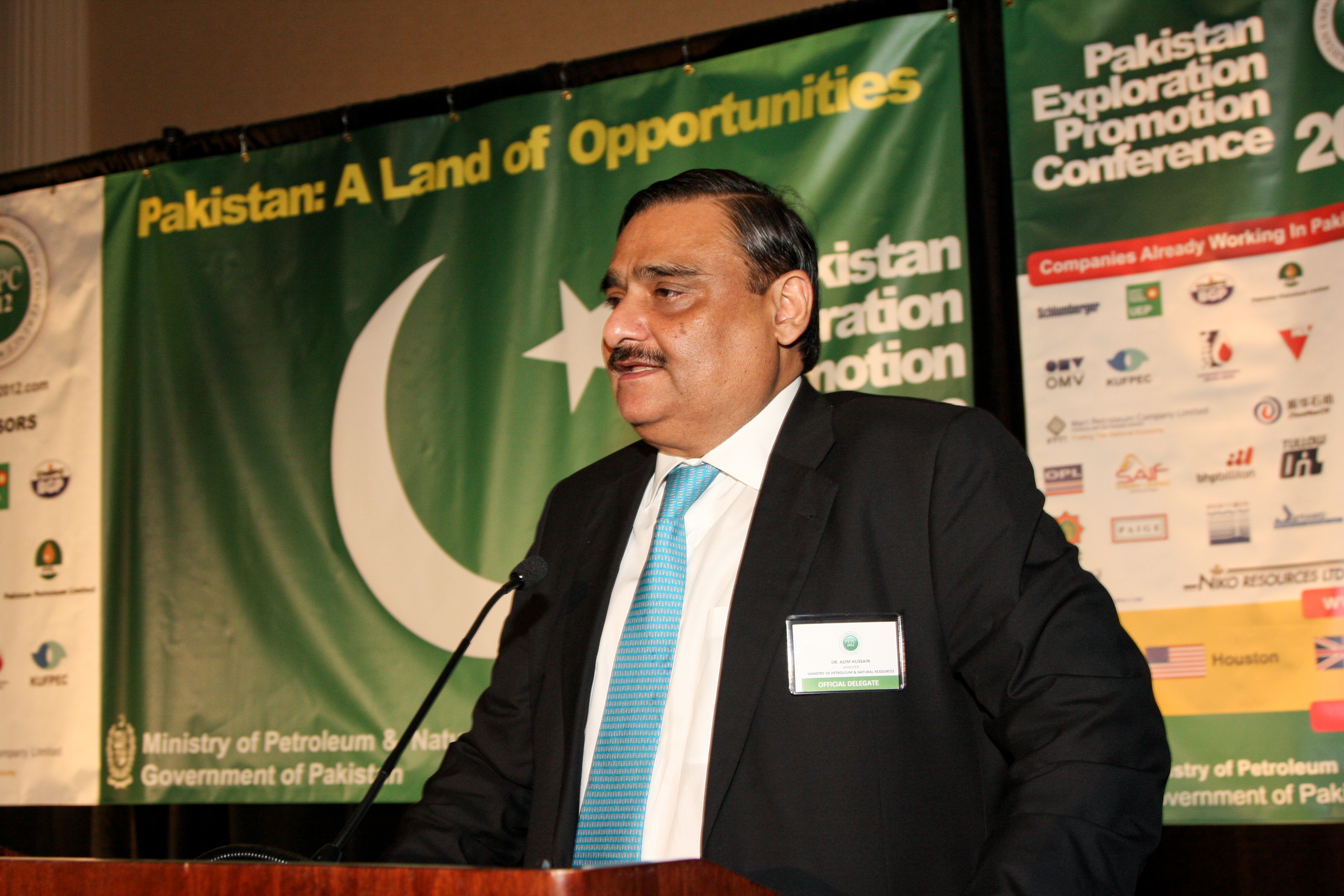
- Hussain addressing a public gathering in 2012

Member of the Senate of Pakistan
- In office 2009 -2015

Personal details
- Born: 28 November 1953 (age 72) Karachi, Federal Capital Territory, Pakistan
- Party: Pakistan People's Party
- Relatives: Ziauddin Ahmad (grandfather)
- Education: Cadet College Petaro
- Alma mater: Dow Medical College
- Known for: Chairman of Dr. Ziauddin Group of Hospitals
- Awards: Sitara-i-Imtiaz (2005); Nishan-i-Imtiaz (2013)
- Website: drasimhussain.com

Military service
- Allegiance: Pakistan
- Years of service: 1990–1995
- Rank: Lieutenant

Asim Hussain, SI, NI (born 28 November 1953) is a Pakistani-Canadian, active in the fields of health, education, and Pakistani politics. He is chairman of Ziauddin Group of Hospitals in Karachi, and former Advisor of Prime Minister for Ministry of Oil and Natural Resources, Pakistan. He was a member of the Senate of Pakistan as part of Pakistan Peoples Party from 2009 to 2015.

In recognition of his services to the nation in the fields of education and health care he was conferred with the Sitara-i-Imtiaz and Nishan-e-Imtiaz in 2005 and 2013, respectively.

== Early life ==
Hussain was born in Karachi on 28 November 1953. After receiving early education at Karachi Grammar School, Cadet College Petaro, Dow Medical College, he went to Europe for further studies.

== Career ==
Hussain served as the Chairman of National Reconstruction Bureau with the status of Federal Minister from May 2008 until November 2009. He was the Advisor to the Prime Minister for Petroleum & Natural Resources/Federal Minister from November 2008 until August 2009. He was the Honorary Personal Physician to the President of Pakistan from 12 December 2009. He was the Advisor/Federal Minister Petroleum & Natural Resource from May 2011 until May 2013.

On 27 August 2015, Hussain was detained by the authorities in an ongoing operation within the city of Karachi launched by the Pakistani Army.

He was appointed as the Chairman of Sindh Higher Education in 2014. In 2018, he was re-appointed for a second term, which ended in 2022.

== Corruption ==
In August 2015, Hussain was apprehended by Rangers at his Clifton office at the Higher Education Commission. He faced accusations of concealing assets, granting illegal allotments, land grabbing, misuse of authority, fraud, awarding illegal contracts during his tenure at Sui Southern Gas Company, and money laundering. This was the start of a five-and-a-half-month period in the custody of various Law enforcement agency. In 2016, an accountability court subsequently placed the former minister under judicial remand and indicted him, along with others, in a corruption reference involving Rs460 billion.

In February 2018, an accountability court indicted Hussain and eight others in a case involving the embezzlement of Rs17 billion related to the illegal awarding of contracts for five gas fields in Sindh to Jamshoro Joint Venture Limited.

== Personal life ==
Hussain ran a travel agency and invested in some property, but did not have the needed Canadian credentials to work as a doctor. He is the grandson of Sir Ziauddin Ahmad.
