= Naima Khatoon =

Indian academic, Vice-chancellor of the Aligarh Muslim University

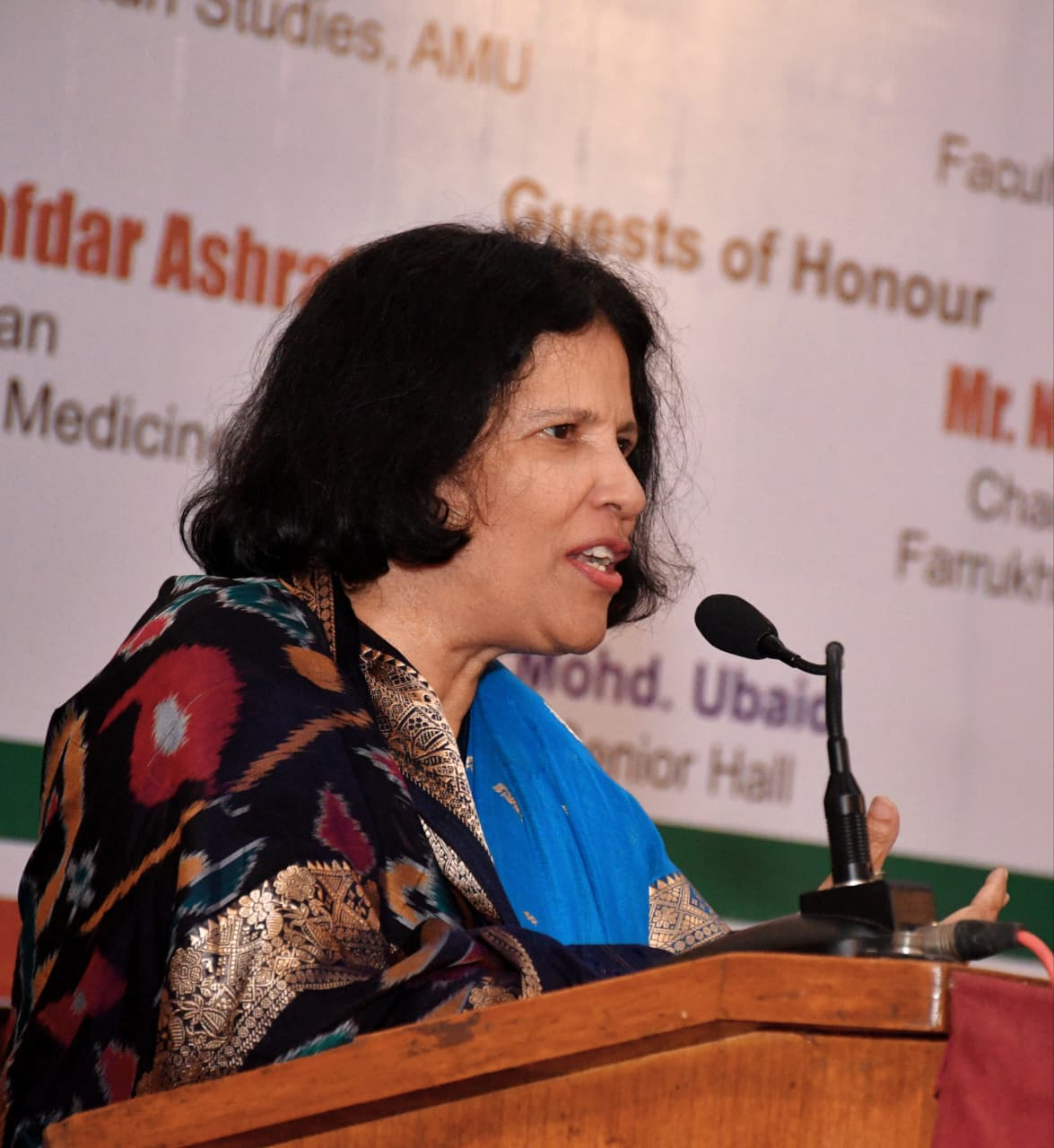
- Prof. Naima Khatoon is delivering a presidential address at the Annual Hall Function (20 September 2025) held at Sir Syed Hall (South), Aligarh Muslim University, Aligarh

Vice Chancellor of Aligarh Muslim University
- Incumbent
- Assumed office 22 April 2024
- Chancellor: Mufaddal Saifuddin
- Preceded by: Tariq Mansoor

Personal details
- Born: 1961 (age 64–65) Jajpur district, Odisha
- Spouse: Mohammad Gulrez
- Education: Aligarh Muslim University
- Occupation: Professor, Vice-Chancellor
- Profession: Teaching, Administration

Prof. Naima Khatoon (born 1961) is an Indian academic, serving as Vice Chancellor of the Aligarh Muslim University. She is the first female Vice-Chancellor in the history of the Aligarh Muslim university in 2024. Khatoon earned her PhD in Psychology from the Aligarh Muslim University and joined as a lecturer in the Department of Psychology in 1988.

She also served as an associate professor at the National University of Rwanda for a period of one year from 1999 to 2000. She then rejoined Aligarh Muslim University as an associate professor and became a Professor in 2006. She has been listed among the 100 most influential Muslims in India- 2024 by Muslim Mirror
