= Al-Musk Lake =

Sewage lake near Jeddah, Saudi Arabia

Coordinates: 21°35′16″N 39°19′08″E

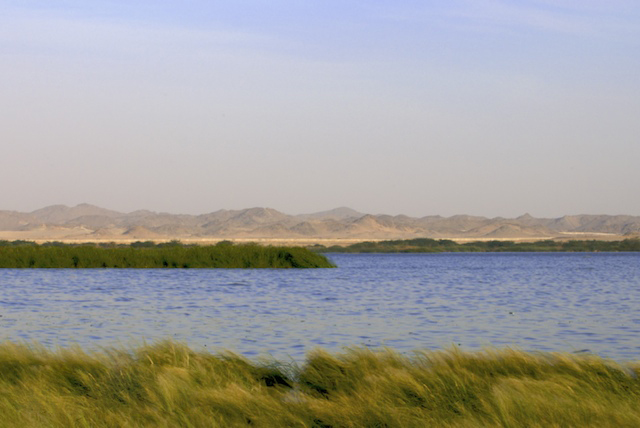
Al-Musk Lake in 2007

Al-Musk Lake (Arabic: بحيرة المسك) was an artificial sewage lake east of Jeddah, Saudi Arabia, a city that (at the time) lacked an underground sewage system. The lake was established by the Municipality of Jeddah in the 1990s. Over time, the lake reached dangerous levels, and in 2005, a concrete precautionary dam was erected to prevent spillover into the city.

In 2010, the lake was drained by Saudi Arabia's National Water Company, acting under government instructions. Despite having been drained of sewage, a 2017 scientific study concluded that the site remained environmentally contaminated.

== See also ==
- Water supply and sanitation in Saudi Arabia
