= Faculty of Social Sciences, Aligarh Muslim University =

Faculty of Social Sciences
- Established: 1969
- Dean: Prof. Shafey Kidwai (From June 26, 2024)
- Location: Aligarh, Uttar Pradesh, India
- Website: https://amu.ac.in/faculties/faculty-of-social-sciences

Faculty of Social Sciences is the faculty of Aligarh Muslim University.

== History ==
In 1969, Faculty of Arts was bifurcated and Faculty of Social Science was created, with the Department of Economics, Education, History, Political Science, Sociology, Islamic Studies, West Asian Studies, Library & Information Science and Psychology attached to it. Department of Journalism and Mass Communication, Physical health & Sports Education and women's Studies. At present 13 Departments/Centres and Interdisciplinary Centre for Development Studies are attached to the Faculty of Social Sciences. Proposal for establishing Department of Anthropology and Department of Population Studies has been forwarded to UGC.

== Course Programme ==
Faculty of Social Science at present offering 08 undergraduate and 20 post graduate programmes in addition to several Diploma and Certificate Courses. Total number of students enrolled in the faculty are 2719, including under-graduate 1176, Post-graduate 1053 Research Scholars 490. Number of Foreign Students enrolled in different programmes is 96.

== Department ==
Faculty has 11 department.

- Department of Economics
- Department of Education
- Department of History
- Department of Islamic Studies
- Department of Library and Information Sciences
- Department of Mass Communication
- Department of Psychology
- Department of Physical Education
- Department of Political Science
- Department of Sociology
- Department of Social Work

== Cyber Library ==
The Faculty has the distinction of establishing "Social Science Cyber Library" one of the first of its kind in the world which is visited by thousands of scholars of about 175 countries across the globe.

The Social Science faculty also has a Conference Hall equipped with latest digital technology, video-conferencing facility is available for seminars and lectures.

== Notable alumni ==
- Jamal Khwaja, former Dean of Arts Faculty, AMU and Member of Parliament, Lok Sabha.
