= Water supply and sanitation in Saudi Arabia =

Data
- Access to an improved water source: 97% (2015)
- Access to improved sanitation: 100% (2015)
- Continuity of supply: n/a
- Average urban water use (L/person/day): 235
- Average urban water and sanitation tariff (US$/m^{3}): 0.03
- Share of household metering: Low
- Annual investment in WSS: US$200/capita and year (estimated needs for 2002–2022), mostly through government subsidies

Institutions
- Decentralization to municipalities: No
- National water and sanitation company: National Water Company (NWC)
- Water and sanitation regulator: None
- Responsibility for policy setting: Ministry of Water and Electricity (MOWE)
- Sector law: No
- Service providers: One (National Water Company) with management contracts for specific cities

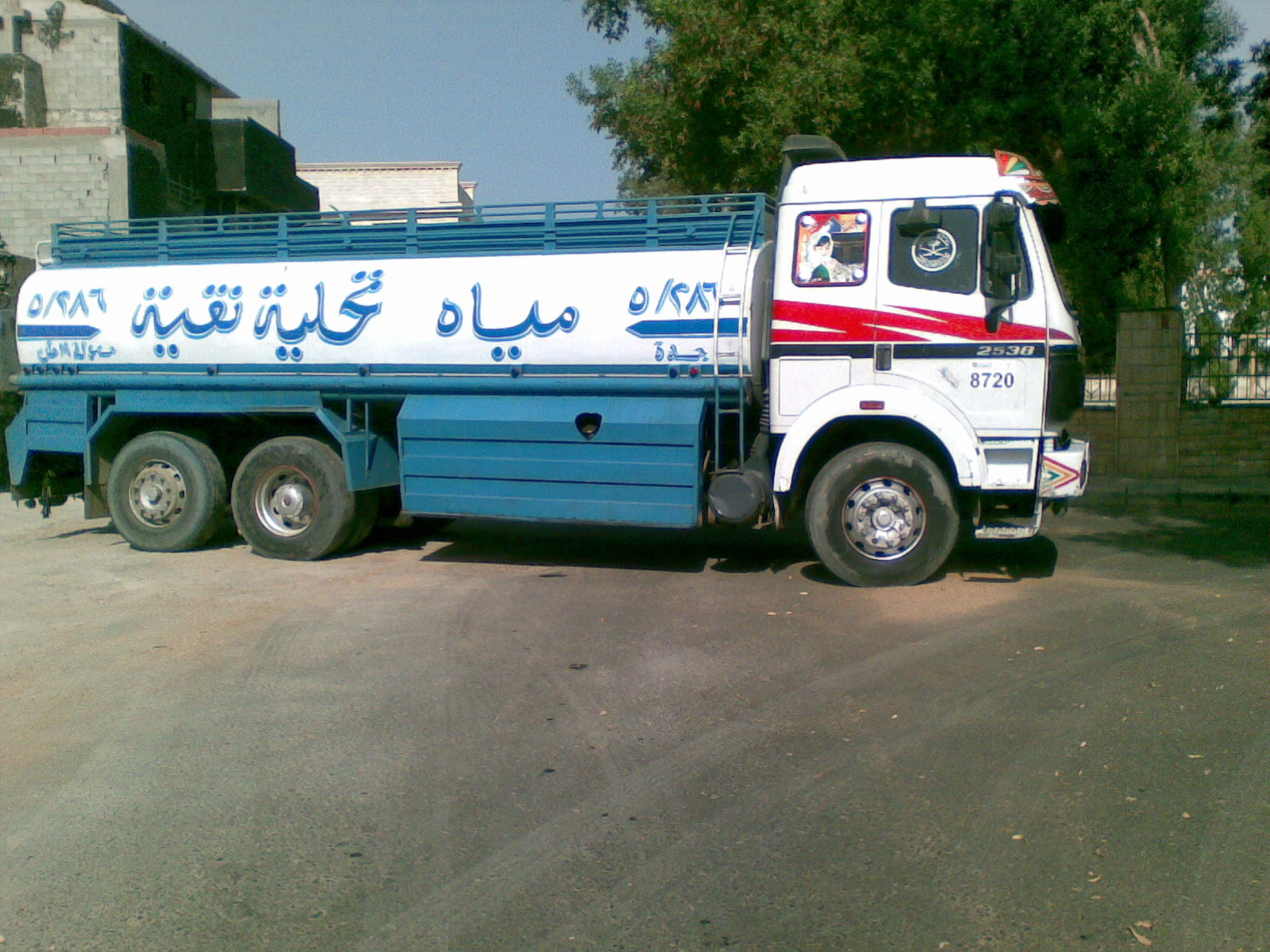
A water service truck in Jeddah

Water supply and sanitation in Saudi Arabia is characterized by challenges and achievements. One of the main challenges is water scarcity. In order to overcome water scarcity, substantial investments have been undertaken in seawater desalination, water distribution, sewerage and wastewater treatment. Today about 50% of drinking water comes from desalination, 40% from the mining of non-renewable groundwater and only 10% from surface water in the mountainous southwest of the country. The capital Riyadh, located in the heart of the country, is supplied with desalinated water pumped from the Persian Gulf over a distance of 467 km. Water is provided almost for free to residential users. Despite improvements, service quality remains poor, for example in terms of continuity of supply. Another challenge is weak institutional capacity and governance, reflecting general characteristics of the public sector in Saudi Arabia. Among the achievements is a significant increases in desalination, and in access to water, the expansion of wastewater treatment, as well as the use of treated effluent for the irrigation of urban green spaces, and for agriculture.

Since 2000, the government has increasingly relied on the private sector to operate water and sanitation infrastructure, beginning with desalination and wastewater treatment plants. Since the creation of the National Water Company (NWC) in 2008, the operation of urban water distribution systems in the four largest cities has gradually been delegated to private companies as well. The apparent paradox of very low water tariffs and water privatization is explained by government subsidies. The government buys desalinated water from private operators at high prices and resells the bulk water for free. Likewise, the government directly pays private operators that run the water distribution and sewer systems of large cities under management contracts. Furthermore, it fully subsidizes investments in water distribution and sewers. Water utilities are expected to recover an increasing share of their costs from the sale of treated effluent to industries. In January 2016 water and sewer tariffs were increased for the first time in more than a decade, which resulted in discontent and in the sacking of the Minister of Water and Energy Abdullah Al-Hussayen in April 2016.

== Access ==
According to the Joint Monitoring Program (JMP) for Water Supply and Sanitation of the WHO and UNICEF, the latest reliable source on access to water and sanitation in Saudi Arabia is the 2004 census. It indicates that 97% of the population had access to an improved source of drinking water and 99% had access to improved sanitation. For 2015, the JMP estimates that access to sanitation increased to 100%. Sanitation was primarily through on-site solutions and only about 40% of the population was connected to sewers. In 2015, still 886 thousand people lacked access to "improved" water.

== Service quality ==
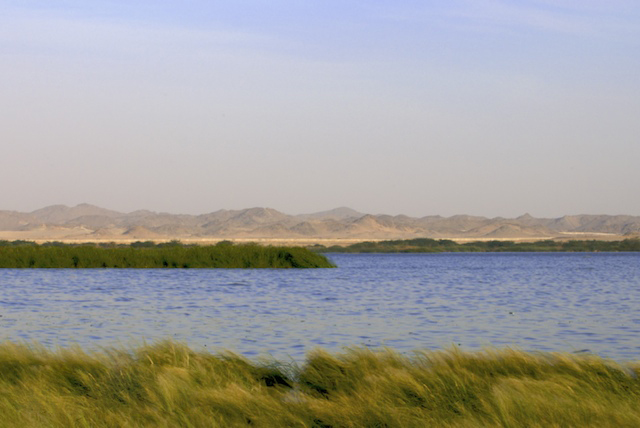
Al-Musk Lake close to Jeddah

Drinking water. Despite clear improvements, the quality of service remains insufficient. For example, few cities enjoy continued service, and water pressure is often inadequate. In Riyadh water was available only once every 2.5 days in 2011, while in Jeddah it is available only every 9 days. This is still better than in 2008, when the respective figures were 5 and 23 days. While systematic data on service quality are now available for several cities, they are not publicly available. In some localities groundwater used for drinking water supply is naturally contaminated with levels of fluoride in excess of the recommended level of 0.7 to 1.2 mg/L. For example, a 1990 study showed that the fluoride level in drinking water in Mecca was 2.5 mg/L. In Riyadh the level of fluoride is reduced far below the recommended level by blending groundwater with desalinated seawater.

Wastewater. There are 33 wastewater treatment plants with a capacity of 748 million cubic meters per year, and 15 more are under construction. Much of the treated wastewater is being reused to water green spaces in the cities (landscaping), for irrigation in agriculture and other uses.

Concentrated sewage from septic tanks is collected through trucks. In Jeddah the trucks dumped sewage for 25 years in a valley that was euphemistically called the "Musk Lake". The pond, holding more than 50 million cubic meters of sewage, almost overflowed during heavy rains in November 2009 threatening to flood parts of the city. After that, the King ordered the lake to be dried up within a year with the help of the National Water Company.

== Water use ==
Total municipal water use in Saudi Arabia has been estimated at 2.28 cubic kilometers per year in 2010, or 13% of total water use. Agriculture accounts for 83% of water use and industry for only 4%. Demand has been growing at the rate of 4.3% per annum (average for the period 1999–2004), in tandem with urban population growth (around 3%). Water supply is usually not metered, neither at the source nor the distribution point. It is tentatively estimated that average water consumption for those connected to the network is about 235 liters per capita per day, a level lower than in the United States.

Water reuse in Saudi Arabia is growing, both at the level of buildings and at the level of cities. For example, ablution water in mosques is being reused for the flushing of toilets. At the city level, treated wastewater is being reused for landscaping, irrigation and in industries such as refining. In Riyadh 50 million cubic meter per year is pumped over 40 km (25 mi) and 60m elevation to irrigate 15,000 hectares of wheat, fodder, orchards and palm trees.

Water conservation measures, such as awareness campaigns through the media and educational pamphlets, have been carried out. In addition, in Riyadh a leakage control program has been carried out and a special, higher water tariff has been introduced. Furthermore, free water appliances (taps, shower heads, toilet boxes) were distributed, reportedly resulting in a decrease of residential water use of between 25 and 35%.

An unknown, but large proportion of the population is dependent on supply through water tankers. For example, Riyadh experiences water shortages and intermittent supply, especially during the summer peak demand. To cope with the shortage, 18 million cubic meters of water was distributed during one summer by private contractors. With the commissioning of a new large well field at Al Honai this problem has been reduced.

== Water resources ==
Saudi Arabia is the third most water-stressed country in the world.

Saudi Arabia is one of the driest regions in the world, with no perennial rivers. Water is obtained from four distinct sources:

- non-renewable groundwater from the deep fossil aquifers
- desalinated water
- surface water
- renewable groundwater from shallow alluvial aquifers

Only the last two sources are renewable. Their volume, however, is minimal. Desalination plants provide about half the country's drinking water. About 40% comes from groundwater. The remainder comes from surface water (about 10%). Desalinated water is prevalent along the coasts, surface water in the southwest region and groundwater elsewhere. The capital Riyadh, however, is supplied to a great extent with desalinated water pumped from the Persian Gulf over 467 km to the city located in the heart of the country.

=== Fossil groundwater ===
Current levels of groundwater extraction far exceed the level of natural recharge: Groundwater is being "mined". For example, the Al-Ahsa aquifer in the Eastern Province experienced a drop of 150 meters over the past 25 years. Since the usable volume of the aquifers is not known, it is not clear how long groundwater mining can be sustained. Estimates of the groundwater stored in the principal aquifers are controversial. According to one estimate, the amount of water stored before modern farming started was 500 billion cubic meters, equivalent to the amount of water in Lake Erie, and by 2012 about 80% of that water had been extracted.

A 2025 study focusing on the urban coastal areas of Qatif, Eastern Province found that up to 35.3% of the tested groundwater samples were classified as unsuitable for human consumption due to elevated concentrations of trace and toxic elements including arsenic and chromium. The research indicated that arsenic presents a high carcinogenic risk in 77% of the samples.

=== Desalination ===
Saudi Arabia is the largest producer of desalinated water in the world. In 2011 the volume of water supplied by the country's 27 desalination plants at 17 locations was 3.3 million m3/day (1.2 billion m3/year). 6 plants are located on the East Coast and 21 plants on the Red Sea Coast. 12 plants use multi-stage flash distillation (MSF) and 7 plants use multi-effect distillation (MED). Both MSF and MED plants are integrated with power plants (dual-purpose plants), using steam from the power plants as a source of energy. 8 plants are single-purpose plants that use reverse osmosis (RO) technology and power from the grid. By far the largest plant in 2012, Jubail II on the East Coast, is a MSF plant built in subsequent stages since 1983 with a capacity of almost 950,000 m3/day that supplies Riyadh. The largest RO plant in 2012 was located in Yanbu on the Red Sea. It supplies the city of Medina and has a capacity of 128,000 m3/day. The MED plants are much smaller. Mecca receives its water from plants in Jeddah and Shoaiba, just south of Jeddah. Ras al Khair, the largest plant of the country with a capacity of 1 million m3/day was opened in 2014, using RO technology.

Saudi Arabia holds approximately 35% of the Arab Region's desalination capacity which includes Algeria, Bahrain, Egypt, Iraq, Jordan, Kuwait, Lebanon, Libya, Mauretania, Morocco, Oman, Palestine, Qatar, Sudan, Syria, Tunisia, the United Arab Emirates, and Yemen. Furthermore, water desalination requires immense amount of energy, 25% of Saudi Arabia's oil and gas production is directed towards cogeneration power desalination plants (CPDPs) to generate electricity and produce water. It is estimated by 2030, 50% of Saudi Arabia's local oil and gas will solely be used to meet the rapidly growing demand for water.

==== Solar desalination ====
The first contract for a large solar-powered desalination plant in Saudi Arabia was awarded in January 2015 to a consortium consisting of Abengoa from Spain and Advanced Water Technology (AWT), the commercial arm of the King Abdulaziz City for Science and Technology (KACST). The $130 million reverse osmosis plant, co-located with a photovoltaic plant in Al Khafji near the Kuwaiti border, was planned to have a capacity of 60,000 m3/day. The plant would rely on grid power at night and its operator expected to sell electricity to the grid in the future. However, Abengoa filed for bankruptcy at the end of 2015, putting the future of the plant in jeopardy.

Once the first plant is commissioned, a plant ten times larger is due to be built at a hitherto undisclosed location. Both plants are part of a national plan, launched in 2010 and called the King Abdullah Initiative for Solar Water Desalination, to massively expand solar desalination.

==== Floating desalination ====
Desalination barges have operated since 2008 to meet high seasonal demand for potable water along the Red Sea coast of the Kingdom. In 2010 the largest floating desalination plant in the world, with a production capacity of 25,000 m3/day (9 million m3/year), was launched on a barge in Yanbu. It is sufficient to supply a city with more than 100,000 inhabitants with drinking water.

=== Surface water and alluvial aquifers ===
The country's mean annual surface runoff has been estimated at more than 2 billion cubic meters per year. The country has eleven renewable alluvial aquifers with an estimated combined mean annual recharge of nearly 1 billion cubic meters per year. According to the World Resources Institute the renewable groundwater and surface water resources overlap, i.e. the entire renewable groundwater resources originate in recharge from rivers (Wadis) so that total renewable water resources are in the order of 2 cubic kilometres/year. Surface resources and renewable aquifers are concentrated in the west and southwest, where rainfall is higher.

== History and recent developments ==
The Saudi water sector, like the entire country, has undergone tremendous changes over the past decades from a system based on the use of local renewable water resources for small-scale irrigation and limited domestic uses to a system largely based on the use of desalinated water and fossil groundwater for large-scale irrigation and domestic, commercial and industrial uses at a level comparable to developed countries. The Saline Water Conversion Corporation, created in 1965, has been an important player in this process of change.

Until 1994 domestic water use was entirely free in Saudi Arabia. Only then a very moderate tariff has been introduced. In the early 2000s the government decided to involve the private sector not only in the construction of infrastructure, but to expand its role also to the financing and operation of infrastructure through Build-Operate-Transfer (BOT) projects. The first BOT project in the water sector was a wastewater treatment plant in Jeddah, followed by Independent Water and Power Projects (IWPPs) for integrated power and desalination plants.

In 2003 the Ministry of Water and Energy was created. It took over the water resources management function from the Ministry of Agricultural and Water and the responsibility for water supply and sanitation from the Ministry of Municipal and Rural Affairs. In the same year the Water & Electricity Company was created as an off-taker for water and electricity produced by the IWPPs.

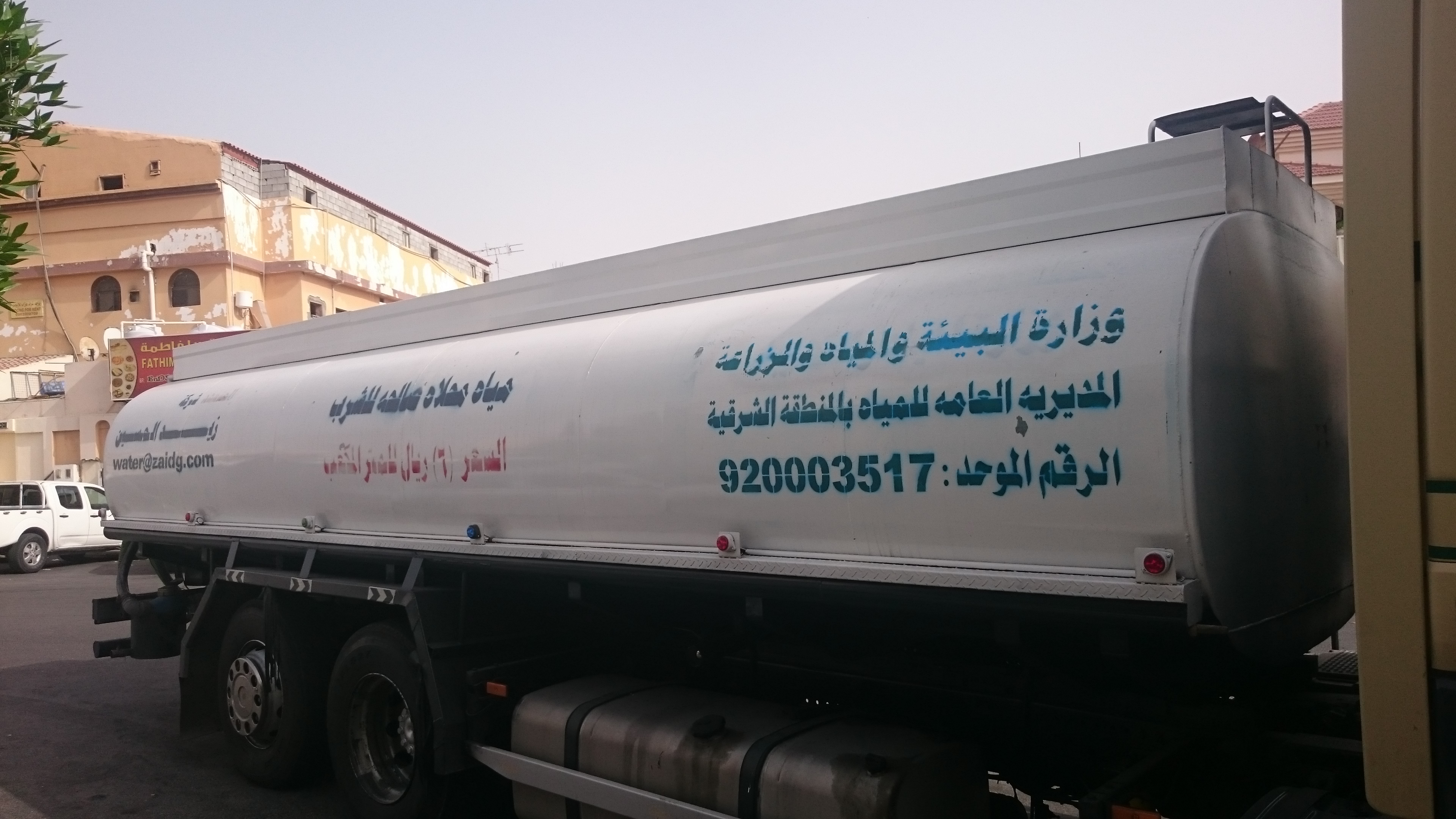
A water tank in Saudi Arabia

In 2008 the privatization program was expanded to drinking water supply when the Kingdom's first management contract was signed for the capital Riyadh, followed by two more management contracts (see below). Beginning with the expiration of the management contract in Riyadh in 2014, it is planned to award 20 to 30-year lease contracts for the cities covered by management contracts. As of late 2014, the timing was pushed back to 2017/18 and NWC expected to take a 40% share in each of the Joint Ventures that would be selected to run the water and sewer systems of the three cities. According to NWC CEO Loay Al-Musallam the Joint Ventures can be profitable despite low water tariffs through the sale of treated effluent, because bulk water and capital investments are provided for free.

Due to generous subsidies for water provided by the government of Saudi Arabia to its people, the country experienced rapid growth in irrigation areas. In 1980, the volume of water consumed in the country was approximately 7.4 billion cubic meters (BCM), nearly tripling to 20.2 BCM in 1994; by 1995, 35% of non-renewable resources of groundwater were drained. In the year 2000, the government of Saudi Arabia took action to mitigate water consumption by decreasing the subsidies and incentivising the usage of water efficient technologies such as drop irrigation and soil moisture sensing equipment. This has led the wheat farming industry to gradually shrink over the years, from producing 4 million tons in 1992 to 1.8 million tons in 2000, and in 2016 the production has come to a halt.

== Responsibility for water supply and sanitation ==
Until the establishment of the National Water Company (NWC) in 2008 there was no separation between institutions in charge of policy and regulation on the one hand, and service provision on the other. Instead all key sector functions were the direct responsibility of a single Ministry, the Ministry of Water and Electricity. The quality and efficiency of service provision are hampered by the many weaknesses afflicting the public sector in Saudi Arabia in general. These include an inadequate civil servants recruitment policy, insufficient salaries, limited skills, no accountability for action taken (or not taken), a lack of strategic planning, and ad-hoc investment decisions.

=== Policy and regulation ===
Since 2016 the Ministry of Environment, Water and Agriculture (MEWA) is responsible for policy and regulation of water and sanitation services. There is no separate regulatory agency for the sector. The recently established Electricity and Co-generating Regulatory Authority (ECRA) only regulates privately owned desalination plants. Agriculture is by far the main water user in the country and contributes in the depletion of fossil aquifers on which a large share of the country's drinking water supply depends.

=== Service provision ===
The responsibility for service provision is shared by the private and public sectors. The National Water Company (NWC) is in charge of water supply and sanitation in the largest cities - Riyadh, Jeddah, Mecca and Taif as of 2013 in partnership with foreign private operators. In other cities water supply and sanitation is still the direct responsibility of MOWE through its regional directorates and branches. Local government, which is in charge of service provision in many other countries, has no role in service provision in Saudi Arabia.

Desalination plants are run by the Saline Water Conversion Corporation (SWCC) which provides water for free to the NWC or by private companies called Independent Water and Power Projects (IWPPs) which sell water and energy to a public entity called the Water & Energy Company. Many wastewater treatment plants are run by private companies under BOT contracts.

==== The National Water Company and management contracts ====
The National Water Company (NWC) plans to become a "leading water utility in the region" within 4 to 7 years after its creation in 2008. NWC's twelve-member Board is chaired by the Minister of Water and Electricity and includes the CEO of the company.

NWC contracts out water distribution services for individual cities to the private sector under management contracts. Key objectives include improving service quality, operational efficiency and customer satisfaction. The contracts are preceded by one-year technical assistance contracts. This is followed by a further 1-2 year validation period during which the baseline and target data for key performance indicators are being reviewed. Tariff levels will not be affected. The scope of the contracts includes training and qualifying Saudi nationals, as well as research and development with the aim to transfer technology.

The three contracts signed so far are:

- In April 2008 for the capital for Riyadh with the French firm Veolia, covering six years and valued at $60m,
- A seven-year contract with the French firm SUEZ for Jeddah,
- In June 2010 for Mecca and Taif with the French firm Groupe Saur, covering five years and valued at $46m.

As required by Saudi law Groupe Saur's team working in Mecca consists entirely of Muslims. Further management contracts are expected to be tendered for Medina and Greater Dammam.

NWC says that between its creation in 2008 and 2012 it has saved 115.4 million m3 of water through leak reduction, improved water quality compliance from 82% to 98.7%, increased customer satisfaction from 45% to 83%, reduced the number of projects that are behind schedule from 104 to 3, and has improved its annual cash collection from SAR561 million ($149 million) to SAR1,119 million ($298 million).

NWC also plans and oversees infrastructure projects such as the SAR 1.6 billion ($426 million) Riyadh Water Supply Programme completed in 2013 that included drilling 43 new wells and building 27 brackish water desalination plants.

NWC had initially been expected to take over Medina in 2011, as well as Dammam and Al-Khobar in 2013.

==== The Saline Water Conversion Corporation ====
The Saline Water Conversion Corporation (SWCC) is in charge of operating the country's publicly owned desalination plants, and operating a network of water transmission pipelines 4,300 kilometres (2,700 mi) to transport the water in bulk from the plants to the major consumption centers, some of them located far inland such as Riyadh. SWCC is the biggest water desalination entity in the world. It has more than 4.6 million m^{3}/day water installed capacity. SWCC has a research department and a training center. Although it formally is a corporation, SWCC is not run like an independent company on commercial principles, but rather like a branch of the government. Its main product, bulk water, is provided for free to its main customer, NWC. As of 2016, SWCC holds some SAR 80 billion ($21 billion) of assets.

In 2008 the government announced plans to "privatize" SWCC by transforming it into a holding company. The holding company would initially supervise affiliated production firms that would run the desalination plants. Subsequently, it would sell off the firms and include the private sector in a way similar to what has been done with the Independent Water and Power Projects (see below). The first plant to be privatized would be in Yanbu. However, the plans have been modified in 2010: The old plants continue to be operated by SWCC, while new plants are built and operated by the private sector. In June 2016, amid low oil prices, it was decided to revive the initial privatization plan. Water minister Abdulrahman Al-Fadhli and SWCC governor Abdulrahman Al-Ibrahim said that the company will become a holding company, served by local production units. Privatisation will be in two stages: first, investment partners for the desalination plants ("production units") will be sought; then shares of the holding company will be sold on the Saudi stock market. Around SAR110 billion ($29.3 billion) funding for investment will be needed by SWCC over the next 15 years.

==== Independent Water and Power Producers for desalination ====
In the early 2000s, Saudi Arabia began to invite the private sector not only to build, but also to finance and operate new desalination plants. A Water and Energy Corporation (WEC) was established as an off-taker that buys water used for municipal uses from the IWPPs through 20-year power and water purchase agreements (PWPAs). The government fully guarantees the payments due from WEC to the IWPPs. This follows the example of Persian Gulf countries, which had introduced IWPPs several years earlier. The first such project in Saudi Arabia was the Shoaiba III Independent Water and Power Producer (IWPP) signed in 2007 and completed in 2010. It is located on the Red Sea and provides water to Jiddah, Mecca and Taif. The second IWPP was the Jubail II project, located next to the Jubail industrial complex on the Persian Gulf coast. The off-taker for the industrial water is the Saudi Company Marafiq, the utility that provides power and water to the industrial cities of Jubail and Yanbu. Formed by Royal Decree in 2000 and established in 2003, it is owned by four public entities and seven private shareholders.

In 2007 Saudi Arabia had plans to launch ten further IWPPs by 2016 with a total investment of $16 billion. However, the Saudi government changed its approach and decided to not procure its plant in Ras al-Khair and other plants from contractors and to operate them through SWCC, as it had been the case before IWPPs were introduced. Ras Al-Khair was opened in 2014 as the largest desalination plant in the world, built at a cost of $7.2 billion.

Independent Water and Power Producers in Saudi Arabia
Location	Status	Capacity (mln m^{3}/year)	Capacity (MW)	Notes
Shoaiba III	Operational in 2010	321	1200	
Jubail II	Operational in 2009	292	2755	
Shuqaiq II	Operational in 2011	77	850	

IN 2016 WEC planned to become again an offtaker for an IWPP, the Al Kahfji solar desalination plant built by Advanced Water Technology (AWT). AWT was the contractor of the plant and could become its operator under a proposed off-take plan. Another large desalination plan on the drawing board is the Jeddah 4 plant that could be implemented as an IWPP, although pre-bidding as a normal construction contract had already been initiated.

==== The Water & Energy Company ====
The Water & Energy Company, created in 2003, is the off-taker for desalinated water produced by privately operated desalination plants. It is jointly owned by SWCC and the Saudi Electricity Company (SEC).

==== Project finance for wastewater treatment plants ====
Project finance, i.e. financing secured primarily by the projected revenue stream of the project, has been commonly used to finance wastewater treatment plants in Saudi Arabia. In May 2002 the first wastewater contract in Saudi Arabia financed in this way, in this case as a BOT contract, was awarded to a consortium of local firms. The consortium was to rehabilitate, operate, maintain and upgrade the wastewater system of the Jeddah Industrial City over a period of 20 years and invest US$32 million. The government has awarded many more BOT wastewater treatment contracts since then, based on the revenue stream of long-term sales agreements for treated wastewater sold to major customers.

== Efficiency ==
The operational efficiency of water and sanitation services is typically measured through the level of non-revenue water and the ratio of staff per 1,000 connections.

Because of the low level of metering it is difficult to estimate the level of non-revenue water in Saudi Arabia. Only in the case of Riyadh, where meters exist, a meaningful estimate has been done, resulting in an estimated 34% of non-revenue water. It is broken down into 21% physical losses and 13% commercial losses from undermetering, illegal connections and authorized unbilled consumption such as for mosques. In addition, 24% of billed consumption is not being paid. The overall level is high by international standards.

A recent benchmarking study showed that the regional directorates are employing 10,500 people to serve 5.7 million customers. This corresponds to about 10 staff per 1,000 connections, which is more than three times higher than in the case of efficiently run utilities. The actual number of people employed in service provision is even higher because many directorates contract out specific services.

== Tariffs and cost recovery ==
Tariffs. The Kingdom has a single increasing block tariff structure for the entire country. Under that structure water and sewer tariffs per unit of water increase with consumption. The new residential tariff schedule - in force since January 1, 2016 and shown in USD equivalents at the exchange rate of January 2016 - is as follows:

Household usage (m^{3}/month)	Water tariff ($/m^{3})	Sewage tariff ($/m^{3})	Combined tariff ($/m^{3})
0-15	0.03	0.01	0.04
16-30	0.27	0.14	0.41
31-45	0.81	0.41	1.22
46-60	1.08	0.54	1.62
61+	1.62	0.81	2.43

Under the new tariff schedule the limit for the first consumption block now is 15 cubic meters per month, down from 50 cubic meters per month previously. The tariff is the first block remains extremely low, but it subsequently increases significantly. The new tariff schedule also introduces a sewer tariff which did not exist before in Saudi Arabia. Tariff adjustments had been proposed for at least six years, but had never been implemented. The increase came following a significant drop in oil prices. The Ministry of Water says that the majority of households would not be significantly affected by the increase, because their consumption remains within the lower consumption blocks. Commercial, industrial and government users are charged according to different, higher tariff schedules.

Prices for water sold by tanker trucks. A cubic meter of water supplied by a water tanker may cost as much as 6 Riyals (US$1.50), or about 20 times more than water supplied through the network. Citizens who are not connected to the piped network, who are often poor, pay up to 40 times more for water than connected households. The monthly water bill is about 1 Riyal (US$0.27), compared to an average mobile phone bill of 200 Riyals. The price of a 19 cubic meter tank is 150 SR, and the price of a 30 cubic meter tank is 180 SR. Although price may change during holidays and peak seasons, and not all cities are the same.

Sale of treated effluent. Through the Treated Sewage Effluent Initiative (TSEI) of the National Water Company, treated wastewater is sold to major water customers, such as industries or golf course operators, under long-term contracts of up to 25 years. This generates a revenue stream that recovers the costs of wastewater treatment under Build-Operate Transfer (BOT) projects financed by the private sector. As of 2011, it was estimated that NWC had signed TSE agreements worth more than 5 billion Saudi Riyals (US$1.33 billion).

Cost recovery and subsidies. Before the 2016 tariff increase, on average "the government (was) only recovering one or two percent of its costs, and the (subsidy) plans are benefiting the rich, not the poor", according to Adil Bushnak. According to a 2000 estimate by the World Bank, the government paid annual subsidies of US$3.2 billion, equivalent to 1.7% of GDP and 7% of oil revenues. Desalinated water is provided for free by SWCC to NWC. Before the introduction of the private sector in Riyadh, the Riyadh branch of MOWE – probably one of the best performing branches - had revenues of 370 million Riyals in 2004, but expenses of 570 million Riyals.

== Investment and financing ==
All investment for water and sanitation, including desalination, is funded directly by the central government's budget. The 7th and 8th Development Plans (covering the periods 2000-2005 and 2006-2010 respectively) allocations for water (including irrigation), covering a period of ten years, amounted to Saudi Riyal 34.9 billion (US$9.2 billion) and Saudi Riyal 41.6 billion (US$11.1 billion) respectively, equivalent to US$2 billion per year.

It has been estimated that between 1975 and 2000 a total of more than US$100bn has been invested in water supply and sanitation, and that a further US$130bn will be needed between 2002 and 2022, corresponding to US$6.5 billion per year or more than US$200 per capita and year. This level of investment in water per capita is among the highest in the world, higher than in the US, the UK or Germany, due to the high cost of desalination and the need to transport water over long distances. It corresponds to about 1.5% of GDP.

== See also ==
- Peak water
- List of water companies in Saudi Arabia
