= Indian Sandhurst Committee =

British colonial committee formed in 1925

The Indian Sandhurst Committee, also known as the Skeen Committee, was a British colonial committee formed in 1925 to study the Indianization of the Indian Army’s officer cadre and recommend the establishment of a military academy in India, modeled on the Royal Military Academy Sandhurst in the United Kingdom. Chaired by General Andrew Skeen, the committee’s work contributed to the founding of the Indian Military Academy (IMA) in Dehradun in 1932.

== Background ==
During World War I (1914–1918), 1.3 million Indians served in the British Indian Army, prompting nationalist demands for greater Indian representation in senior military roles. In 1918, the British government reserved 10 annual vacancies for Indians at Sandhurst, but this was deemed insufficient by Indian leaders.

The Montague-Chelmsford Reforms (1919) and the Sapru Committee (1921) further pressed for Indianization, leading to the establishment of the Prince of Wales Royal Indian Military College in Dehradun in 1922 to prepare cadets for Sandhurst. In 1923, the Eight Unit Scheme Indianized only eight units of the Indian Army, drawing criticism for its limited scope.

== Formation and objectives ==
Appointed in June 1925 under Viceroy Lord Reading (1921–1926), the Indian Sandhurst Committee was tasked with addressing these demands.

Its objectives included evaluating the induction of Indian aspirants for the King’s Commission, expanding eligibility to technical branches (Artillery, Signals, Engineers), and proposing a military academy in India.

The committee, chaired by General Andrew Skeen, conducted visits to military educational institutions in England and other countries to inform its recommendations.

== Recommendations ==
The committee submitted its report on November 14, 1926, recommending:

• Increasing the number of Indian cadet vacancies at Sandhurst from 10 to 20 per year.

• Making Indians eligible for King’s Commissions in Artillery, Signals, and Engineers, beyond infantry roles.

• Using the University Training Corps (UTC) as a suitable training mechanism for officer candidates.

• Establishing an Indian military academy to train officers locally, reducing reliance on Sandhurst.

While the British government did not fully adopt these recommendations, it agreed to increase Sandhurst vacancies to 20. The report laid the groundwork for the Chetwode Committee (1931), which finalized plans for the Indian Military Academy, opened in Dehradun on October 1, 1932.

== Impact ==
The Indian Sandhurst Committee was a pivotal step in the Indianization of the Indian Army, addressing nationalist aspirations for greater military representation.

The IMA, established as a result of its recommendations, trained officers who became key figures in post-independence India and Pakistan, including Field Marshal K.M. Cariappa, the first Indian Commander-in-Chief of the Indian Army, and Field Marshal Ayub Khan, President of Pakistan.

The committee’s work is recognized in historical and academic studies for its role in shaping modern Indian military institutions.
