= Mohammad Naseem Faruqui =

- Born: Sultanpur Uttar Pradesh
- Died: 24 August 2012; Kanpur
- Education: IIT Kharagpur
- Occupations: Academic, Administrator
- Employer: Aligarh Muslim University
- Known for: Introducing advance computer education at AMU
- Title: Vice Chancellor of Aligarh Muslim University
- Term: 1990-94
- Successor: Mahmoodur Rahman

Mohammad Naseem Faruqui was the vice-chancellor of Aligarh Muslim University from 1990 to 1994. Prof. Faruqui obtained his PhD degree in 1965 from IIT Kharagpur and served as its deputy director.
