= Kamboj =

Social group in India and Pakistan

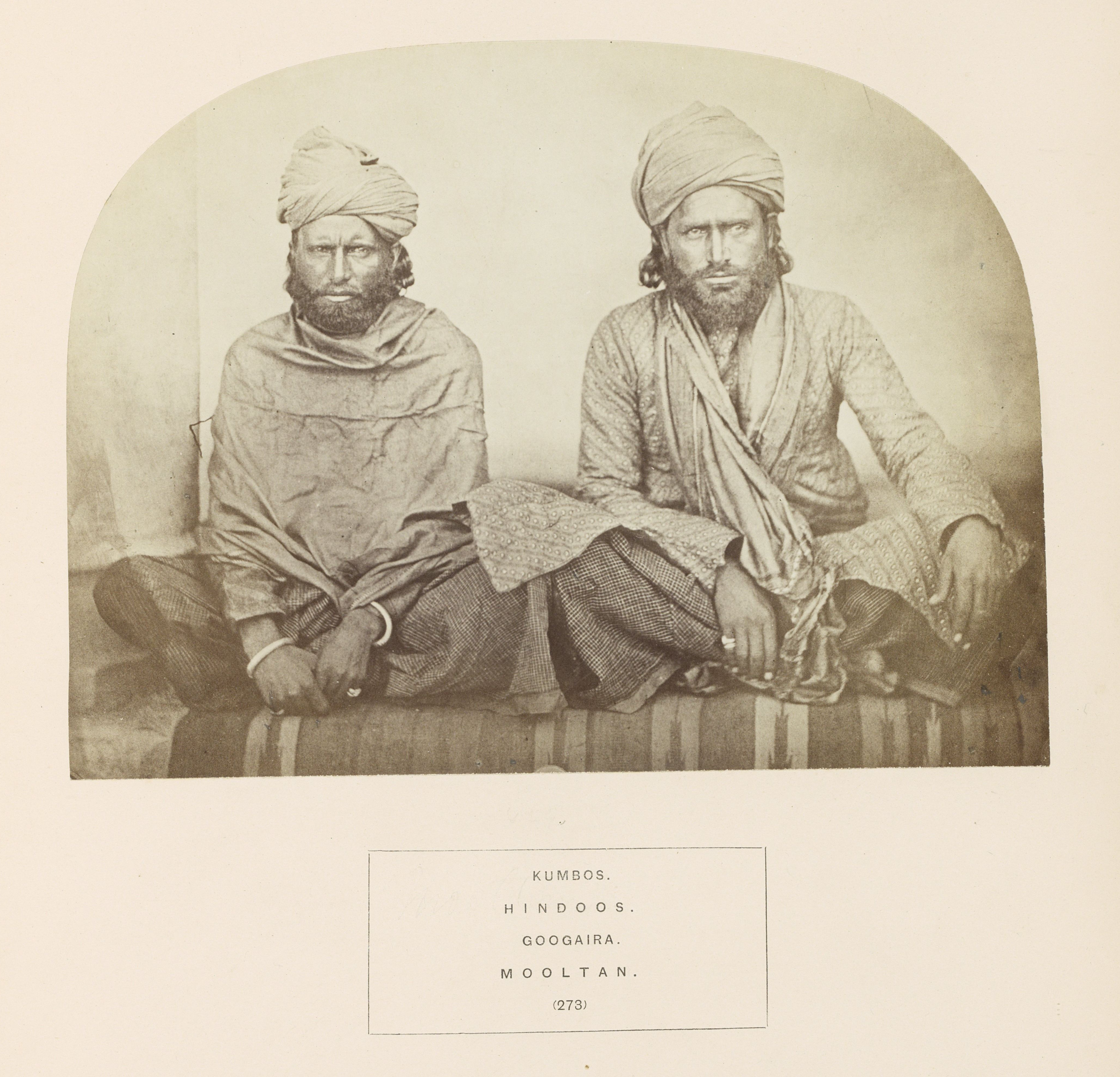
- Portrait of two unidentified men of the Kamboj (or Kamboh) tribe of Multan, ca.1862–72

Regions with significant populations
- India • Pakistan

Languages
- Punjabi • Dogri • Haryanvi • Hindi

Religion
- Hinduism • Sikhism • Islam

The Kamboj (Devanagari: कम्बोज, Nastaliq: کمبوج, Gurumukhi: ਕੰਬੋਜ ALA-LC: Kamboj), also Kamboh (Nastaliq: کمبوہ ALA-LC: Kamboh), is a caste and agrarian community of India and Pakistan.

== Demographics ==
=== Religion ===
As per the 1931 census of Punjab Province, most Kambojs followed Sikhism (42.4%) and Islam (41.5%), with a considerable minority following Hinduism (16.1%).

The Hindu and the Sikh Kambojs are found in the Punjab, Haryana and Jammu regions in India, while most of the Muslim Kambojs, known as Kambohs, are found in the province of Punjab in Pakistan.

The Muslim Kambohs were particularly influential in the administration and the military of the Mughal Empire from the times of Akbar onward. Some famous personalities include Mughal general Shahbaz Khan Kamboh and 16-century Sufi saint Shaikh Gadai Kamboh.

=== Numbers ===
As per the 2017 Pakistani census, Kamboh made around 5% of Lahore's population, which back then amounted to some 550,000 individuals out of a total population of 11 million.

== See also ==
- Kambojas
