= Thomas Colman Dibdin =

English painter

Thomas Robert Colman Dibdin
- Born: 22 October 1810; Betchworth, Surrey, England
- Died: 26 December 1893 (aged 83); Sydenham, England

Thomas Robert Colman Dibdin (22 October 1810 – 26 December 1893) was an English water colour artist and teacher.

== Biography ==
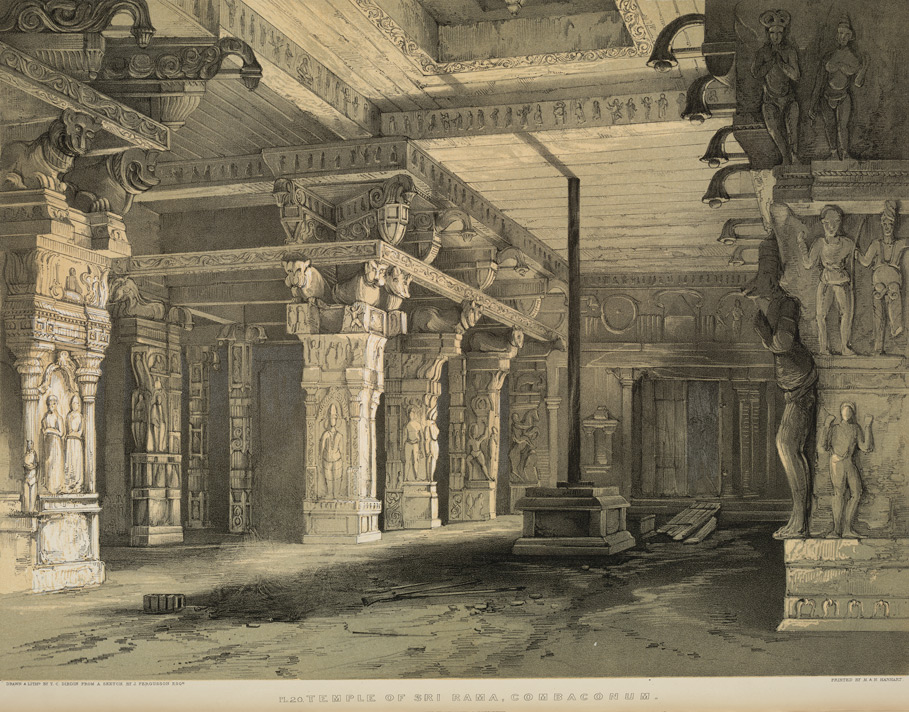
Sri Ramamswamy temple, Kumbakonam, ca 1847 by T.C.Dibdin.

Dibdin was born in Betchworth, Surrey. He was the son of playwright and actor Thomas John Dibdin and the grandson of playwright, actor, and amateur painter Charles Dibdin. His son Robert Lowes Dibdin was also a painter, his granddaughter Marian Alice Montford (née Dibdin) a painter, and his great-grandson Adrian Montford was a sculptor.

Dibdin apprenticed with a pharmacist and then from about 1827 to 1838, he worked for the postal service as a clerk in the General Post Office. He then became a self-taught painter. He travelled to northern France, Germany, and Belgium, where he sketched old towns and buildings. In London, he worked as a stage painter for the Olympic Theatre and the City Theatre. In 1846 John Money Carter published Select Views of the Rock and Fortress of Gibraltar. Dibdin created a series of colour lithographs based on Carter's work. In 1851, Dibdin painted a diorama of the Ganges for Sadler's Wells.

== Death and legacy ==
Due to failing eyesight, he gave up painting in 1883. He died in Sydenham on December 26, 1893.

He did paintings in Gibraltar and India although the latter were created in England based on detailed sketches. In 1852 he published a guide to water colour painting. His paintings can be seen in galleries in London and Sheffield.
