= Tariq Mansoor =

Indian politician

Member of Uttar Pradesh Legislative council
- Incumbent
- Assumed office 2023
- Constituency: Nominated By Governor

National Vice President, BJP
- Incumbent
- Assumed office 2023

Vice-chancellor of Aligarh Muslim University
- In office 17 May 2017 – 2 April 2023
- Chancellor: Mufaddal Saifuddin
- Preceded by: Zameer Uddin Shah
- Succeeded by: Naima Khatoon

Personal details
- Born: 20 September 1956 (age 70)
- Citizenship: Indian
- Party: Bharatiya Janata Party
- Education: Aligarh Muslim University
- Profession: Professor, Politician

Tariq Mansoor (born 20 September 1956) is an Indian academic and professor. he served as the vice-chancellor of the Aligarh Muslim University from 17 May 2017 to 2 April 2023. He is presently a nominated member of Uttar Pradesh Legislative Council by the Bharatiya Janata Party on 3 April 2023. He was also a member of Padma award committee 2023.

== Biography ==
He was previously a professor at the Jawaharlal Nehru Medical College, Aligarh in the Department of Surgery.

After the release of BBC documentary named India: The Modi Question, Mansoor criticized the BBC for its "agenda-driven journalism".
