= 1946 Indian Constituent Assembly election =

1946 indirect election in British India

First Indian Constituent Assembly Election
- July 1946

296 seats in the Constituent Assembly of India 149 seats needed for a majority
- Registered: 1,585
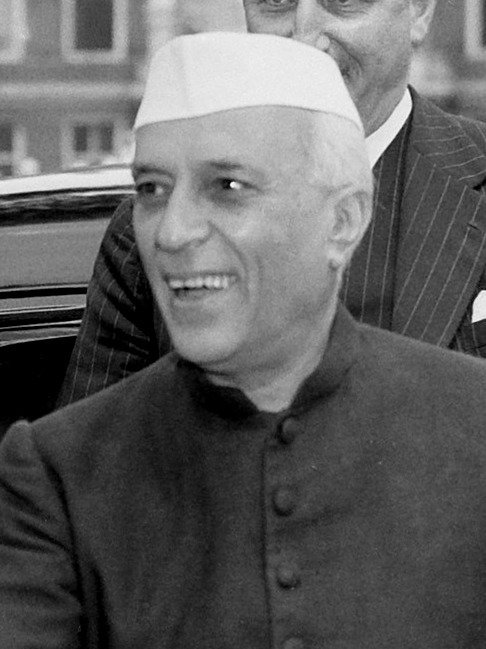

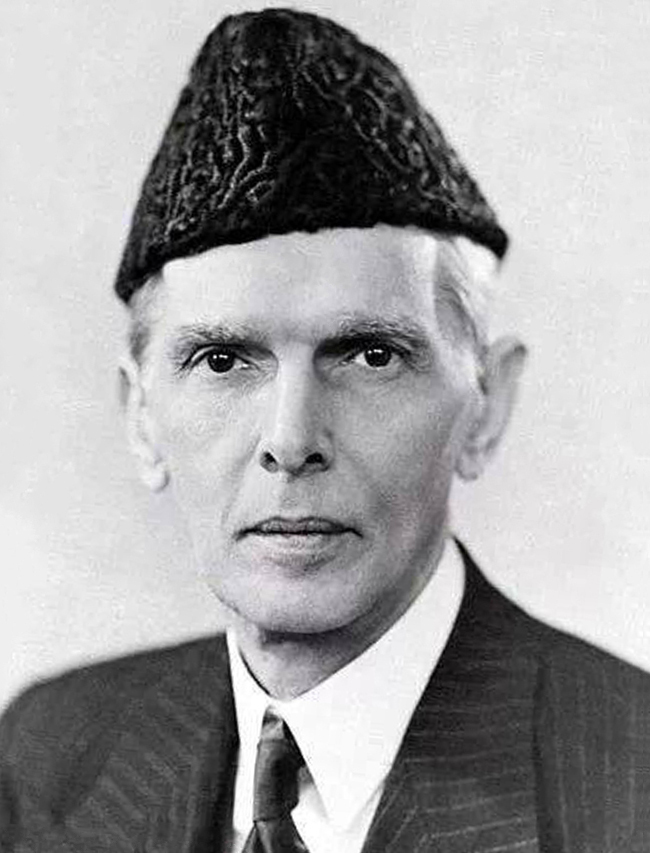
	First party	Second party
Leader	Jawaharlal Nehru	Muhammad Ali Jinnah
Party	INC	AIML
Seats won	211	73
Seat change	▲154	▲43
Head of Government before election
Lord Archibald Wavell
Elected Head of Government
Jawaharlal Nehru
INC

In 1946, prior to the independence of India, members of the Constituent Assembly of India were selected through an indirect election by the elected legislators of the 1946 Indian provincial elections, conducted under the British government's Cabinet Mission plan.

The Indian National Congress led by Jawaharlal Nehru secured a commanding majority, winning 211 of the 296 contested seats. The All-India Muslim League captured 73 seats, successfully consolidating the reserved Muslim constituencies. This led to the creation of the Interim Government of India, headed by Nehru. Despite the successful formation of the Assembly, the Muslim League ultimately boycotted its proceedings, demanding the creation of a separate state of Pakistan. This political deadlock paved the way for the partition of the British India and the eventual establishment of the Constituent Assembly of Pakistan and Constituent Assembly of India.

== Background ==
After the 1946 Indian provincial elections were held across all provinces of British India to elect legislative assemblies, the British government sent a Cabinet Mission to the colony. The mission proposed the creation of a single Indian confederation in which the group of provinces would have the freedom to create their own constitutions as self-governing units. According to the proposal, a Constituent Assembly was to be formed, which would then lead to the creation of an interim government. This interim government would convene the assembly. On 30 June 1946, it was announced from the Viceroy's House that the elections would be held in July.

== Nominations ==
On 30 June 1946, the Indian National Congress formed a committee for the purpose of the elections in Bengal Province. It was reported that the party would nominate candidates for 25 seats in the province. Meanwhile, before the nomination deadline of 19 July, the party was attempting to find candidates in Punjab Province, and it was reported that they were even considering nominating individuals from outside the party. On 1 July 1946, the All-India Muslim League announced the names of some candidates for the Constituent Assembly elections. On 2 July, it was announced that the Congress had sent election instructions to the heads and secretaries of the provincial branches of its parliamentary party. On 3 July, the Hindu Mahasabha confirmed its participation in the Constituent Assembly elections. On 4 July, the Indian National Congress announced its list of candidates for Bihar Province. On the same day, the All-India Muslim League finalized its candidates for United Provinces and also announced candidates for Bombay Province, Bihar Province, and Punjab Province. On 5 July, League announced more candidates. On the same day, Abdul Samad Khan Achakzai was nominated from Anjuman-i-Watan for the scheduled 12 July election in Baluchistan Province. Meanwhile, the Congress called for applications to nominate candidates from Bengal Province. On 8 July, the Congress announced 7 candidates from Assam Province. After the nomination deadline of 10 July passed, it was revealed that for the 60 Constituent Assembly seats from Bengal Province, 26 Congress and 33 League candidates submitted nominations to the Bengal Legislative Assembly. On 12 July, nominations were submitted for 28 candidates from Bihar Province. On 14 July, the Congress announced 19 candidates from Bombay Province. On 13 July, the Congress finalized 45 candidates for Madras Province. Before the deadline for withdrawal of nominations on 15 July, all Sikh candidates from Punjab Province withdrew their nominations. On the same day, the Congress finalized its candidates for 16 general seats from Central Provinces and Berar. As the representatives from the Baluchistan region were already members of the Shahi Jirga and Quetta Municipality, the All-India Muslim League did not nominate any candidates from that region.

== Results ==
On 16 July, from Assam Province, 7 candidates from the Indian National Congress and 3 from the All-India Muslim League were elected. From Bengal Province, 32 Muslim seats were won by the All-India Muslim League, and 1 by the Krishak Praja Party. Additionally, out of 27 general seats, the Indian National Congress won 26. In Central Provinces and Berar, 17 Congress candidates were elected unopposed. From Orissa Province, 8 candidates from the Indian National Congress and 1 independent were elected. In the North-West Frontier Province, out of three seats, 1 went to the All-India Muslim League and 2 to the Indian National Congress. From Punjab Province, 15 seats were won by the All-India Muslim League and 1 by the Unionist Party. However, the Unionist member was later expelled. In Punjab, the Congress had 5 upper-caste Hindus, 1 Harijan, and the Unionists had 1 upper-caste Hindu and 1 Harijan elected. From the Sindh Province, 3 candidates from the All-India Muslim League and 1 from the Indian National Congress were elected, while from Baluchistan, 1 independent candidate won. From the United Provinces, 45 candidates from the Indian National Congress, 7 from the All-India Muslim League, and 3 independents were elected. In Bihar Province, 28 from Indian National Congress, 5 from the All-India Muslim League, and 3 independents won. From Madras Province, 4 Muslim League members were elected unopposed. Indian National Congress won all 45 general seats in Madras Province. From Bombay Province, 19 Congress candidates were elected, along with 2 unopposed Muslim League members. As of 24 July, Congress had won 207 seats, the Muslim League 73, independents 12, and other parties 3 seats.

Party	Votes	%	Seats
Indian National Congress			211
All-India Muslim League			73
Independents and Others			12
Total			296
Registered voters/turnout	1,585	–	

State/Province	Seat	Candidate	Party
Ajmer-Merwara	General	Mukut Bihari Lai Bhargava	Indian National Congress
Assam	General	Akshay Kumar Das	Indian National Congress
Assam	General	Basanta Kumar Das	Indian National Congress
Assam	General	Dharanidhar Basumatari	Indian National Congress
Assam	General	Gopinath Bardoloi	Indian National Congress
Assam	General	J. J. Nichols Roy	Indian National Congress
Assam	General	Omeo Kumar Das	Indian National Congress
Assam	General	Rohini Kumar Chaudhari	Indian National Congress
Assam	Muslim	Abdul Hamid	All-India Muslim League
Assam	Muslim	Abdul Matin Choudhury	All-India Muslim League
Assam	Muslim	Muhammad Saadulla	All-India Muslim League
Baluchistan	–	Mohammad Khan Jogazai	Independent politician
Bengal	General	Arun Chandra Guha	Indian National Congress
Bengal	General	Ashutosh Mallick	Indian National Congress
Bengal	General	Damber Singh Gurung	Indian National Congress
Bengal	General	Debi Prasad Khaitan	Indian National Congress
Bengal	General	Dhananjoy Roy	Indian National Congress
Bengal	General	Dhirendranath Datta	Indian National Congress
Bengal	General	Frank Reginald Anthony	Indian National Congress
Bengal	General	H. C. Mookerjee	Indian National Congress
Bengal	General	Hem Chandra Naskar	Indian National Congress
Bengal	General	Jnanendra Chandra Majumdar	Indian National Congress
Bengal	General	Kiran Sankar Roy	Indian National Congress
Bengal	General	Lila Roy	Indian National Congress
Bengal	General	Prafulla Chandra Ghosh	Indian National Congress
Bengal	General	Prafulla Chandra Sen	Indian National Congress
Bengal	General	Pramatha Ranjan Thakur	Indian National Congress
Bengal	General	Prasanna Deb Raikat	Indian National Congress
Bengal	General	Priya Ranjan Sen	Indian National Congress
Bengal	General	Radhanath Das	Indian National Congress
Bengal	General	Raj Kumar Chakravarty	Indian National Congress
Bengal	General	Sarat Chandra Bose	Indian National Congress
Bengal	General	Satya Ranjan Bakshi	Indian National Congress
Bengal	General	Surendra Mohan Ghose	Indian National Congress
Bengal	General	Suresh Chandra Banerjee	Indian National Congress
Bengal	General	Syama Prasad Mookerjee	Indian National Congress
Bengal	General	Uday Chand Mahtab	Indian National Congress
Bengal	General	B. R. Ambedkar	Scheduled Castes Federation
Bengal	General	Somnath Lahiri	Communist Party
Bengal	Muslim	A. M. Abdul Hamid	All-India Muslim League
Bengal	Muslim	Abdul Kasem Khan	All-India Muslim League
Bengal	Muslim	Abdulla-al-Mahmood	All-India Muslim League
Bengal	Muslim	Abul Hashem	All-India Muslim League
Bengal	Muslim	Bazlul Karim	All-India Muslim League
Bengal	Muslim	Ebrahim Khan	All-India Muslim League
Bengal	Muslim	Fazlur Rahman	All-India Muslim League
Bengal	Muslim	Formuzul Huq	All-India Muslim League
Bengal	Muslim	Ghiyasuddin Pathan	All-India Muslim League
Bengal	Muslim	H. S. Suhrawardy	All-India Muslim League
Bengal	Muslim	Haniidul Huq Chowdhury	All-India Muslim League
Bengal	Muslim	I. H. Qureshi	All-India Muslim League
Bengal	Muslim	K. Nuruddin	All-India Muslim League
Bengal	Muslim	K. Shahabuddin	All-India Muslim League
Bengal	Muslim	Khwaja Nazimuddin	All-India Muslim League
Bengal	Muslim	Liaquat Ali Khan	All-India Muslim League
Bengal	Muslim	M. A. Ispahani	All-India Muslim League
Bengal	Muslim	M. Altaf Ahmed	All-India Muslim League
Bengal	Muslim	M. Azizul Haque	All-India Muslim League
Bengal	Muslim	M. S. Ali	All-India Muslim League
Bengal	Muslim	Mahmud Hussain	All-India Muslim League
Bengal	Muslim	Mazharul Huq	All-India Muslim League
Bengal	Muslim	Md. Abdiilla-hel Baqui	All-India Muslim League
Bengal	Muslim	Mohammad Hassan	All-India Muslim League
Bengal	Muslim	Mohammad Hussain Malik	All-India Muslim League
Bengal	Muslim	Mujibar Rahman Khan	All-India Muslim League
Bengal	Muslim	Raghib Ahsan	All-India Muslim League
Bengal	Muslim	S. S. Ikramullah	All-India Muslim League
Bengal	Muslim	Serajul Islam	All-India Muslim League
Bengal	Muslim	Shabbir Ahmad Usmani	All-India Muslim League
Bengal	Muslim	Tamizuddin Khan	All-India Muslim League
Bengal	Muslim	Yusuf Mirza	All-India Muslim League
Bengal	Muslim	A. K. Fazlul Huq	Krishak Praja Party
Bihar	General	Amiyo Kumar Ghosh	Indian National Congress
Bihar	General	Anugrah Narayan Singh	Indian National Congress
Bihar	General	Banarsi Prasad Jhunjhunwala	Indian National Congress
Bihar	General	Bhagwat Prasad	Indian National Congress
Bihar	General	Boniface Lakra	Indian National Congress
Bihar	General	Brajeswar Prasad	Indian National Congress
Bihar	General	Chandrika Ram	Indian National Congress
Bihar	General	Devendranath Samanta	Indian National Congress
Bihar	General	Dipnarain Singh	Indian National Congress
Bihar	General	Guptanath Singh	Indian National Congress
Bihar	General	Jadubans Sahay	Indian National Congress
Bihar	General	Jagdish Narain Lal	Indian National Congress
Bihar	General	Jagjivan Ram	Indian National Congress
Bihar	General	K. T. Shah	Indian National Congress
Bihar	General	Kamaleshwari Prasad Yadav	Indian National Congress
Bihar	General	Mahesh Prasad Singh	Indian National Congress
Bihar	General	Narain Mahtha	Indian National Congress
Bihar	General	P. K. Sen	Indian National Congress
Bihar	General	Phulan Prasad Varma	Indian National Congress
Bihar	General	Raghunandan Prasad	Indian National Congress
Bihar	General	Rajendra Prasad	Indian National Congress
Bihar	General	Rameshwar Prasad Singh	Indian National Congress
Bihar	General	Ramnarain Singh	Indian National Congress
Bihar	General	Sachchidananda Sinha	Indian National Congress
Bihar	General	Sarangdhar Singh	Indian National Congress
Bihar	General	Sarojini Naidu	Indian National Congress
Bihar	General	Satyanarain Sinha	Indian National Congress
Bihar	General	Sri Krishna Sinha	Indian National Congress
Bihar	General	Jaipal Singh	Independent politician
Bihar	General	Kameshwar Singh	Independent politician
Bihar	General	Shyam Nandan Sahay	Independent politician
Bihar	Muslim	Hussain Imam	All-India Muslim League
Bihar	Muslim	Latifur Rahman	All-India Muslim League
Bihar	Muslim	Muhammad Tahir	All-India Muslim League
Bihar	Muslim	Saiyid Jaffar Imam	All-India Muslim League
Bihar	Muslim	Tajamal Hussain	All-India Muslim League
Bombay	General	Alban D’Souza	Indian National Congress
Bombay	General	B. G. Kher	Indian National Congress
Bombay	General	B. M. Gupte	Indian National Congress
Bombay	General	H. V. Pataskar	Indian National Congress
Bombay	General	Hansa Mehta	Indian National Congress
Bombay	General	K. M. Jedhe	Indian National Congress
Bombay	General	K. M. Munshi	Indian National Congress
Bombay	General	Kanyalal Desai	Indian National Congress
Bombay	General	Khandubhai Desai	Indian National Congress
Bombay	General	M. R. Masani	Indian National Congress
Bombay	General	N. V. Gadgil	Indian National Congress
Bombay	General	R. M. Nalwade	Indian National Congress
Bombay	General	R. R. Diwakar	Indian National Congress
Bombay	General	S. K. Patil	Indian National Congress
Bombay	General	S. N. Mane	Indian National Congress
Bombay	General	S. Nijalingappa	Indian National Congress
Bombay	General	Vallabhbhai Patel	Indian National Congress
Bombay	General	Shankarrao Deo	Indian National Congress
Bombay	General	Shantilal Shah	Indian National Congress
Bombay	Muslim	Abdul Kader Sheikh	All-India Muslim League
Bombay	Muslim	I. I. Chundrigar	All-India Muslim League
Central Provinces and Berar	General	Amrit Kaur	Indian National Congress
Central Provinces and Berar	General	Bhagwantrao Annabhan Mandloi	Indian National Congress
Central Provinces and Berar	General	Brijlal Nandlal Biyani	Indian National Congress
Central Provinces and Berar	General	Cecil Edward Gibbon	Indian National Congress
Central Provinces and Berar	General	Govinddas	Indian National Congress
Central Provinces and Berar	General	Guru Agamdas Agarmandas	Indian National Congress
Central Provinces and Berar	General	Hari Singh Gaur	Indian National Congress
Central Provinces and Berar	General	Hari Vishnu Kamath	Indian National Congress
Central Provinces and Berar	General	Hemchandra Jagobaji Khandekar	Indian National Congress
Central Provinces and Berar	General	Laxman Slirawan Bhatkar	Indian National Congress
Central Provinces and Berar	General	Punjabrao Shamrao Deshmukh	Indian National Congress
Central Provinces and Berar	General	Ravi Shankar Sukla	Indian National Congress
Central Provinces and Berar	General	Rustomji Khursedji Sidhwa	Indian National Congress
Central Provinces and Berar	General	Shankara Tryambak Dharmadhikari	Indian National Congress
Central Provinces and Berar	General	Thakur Chhedilal	Indian National Congress
Central Provinces and Berar	General	V. R. Kalappa	Indian National Congress
Central Provinces and Berar	Muslim	Kazi Syed Karimuddin	All-India Muslim League
Coorg	General	C. M. Punachcha	Indian National Congress
Madras	General	Ammu Swaminathan	Indian National Congress
Madras	General	Alladi Krishnaswami Aiyar	Indian National Congress
Madras	General	B. Gopala Reddi	Indian National Congress
Madras	General	B. Shiva Rao	Indian National Congress
Madras	General	C. Perumalswami Reddiar	Indian National Congress
Madras	General	C. Rajagopalachari	Indian National Congress
Madras	General	C. Subramaniam	Indian National Congress
Madras	General	D. Govind Doss	Indian National Congress
Madras	General	Dakshayani Velayudhan	Indian National Congress
Madras	General	G. Durga Bai	Indian National Congress
Madras	General	H. Sitarama Reddi	Indian National Congress
Madras	General	Jerome D’Souza	Indian National Congress
Madras	General	K. Chandramouli	Indian National Congress
Madras	General	K. Kamaraj Nadar	Indian National Congress
Madras	General	K. Madhava Menon	Indian National Congress
Madras	General	K. Santhanam	Indian National Congress
Madras	General	Kala Venkata Rao	Indian National Congress
Madras	General	L. Krishnaswami Bharathi	Indian National Congress
Madras	General	M. Anantasayanam Iyengar	Indian National Congress
Madras	General	M. C. Virabahu Pillai	Indian National Congress
Madras	General	Muthia Chettiar	Indian National Congress
Madras	General	N. G. Ranga	Indian National Congress
Madras	General	N. Gopalaswami Ayyangar	Indian National Congress
Madras	General	N. Sanjeev Reddi	Indian National Congress
Madras	General	O. P. Ramaswami Reddiar	Indian National Congress
Madras	General	O. V. Alagesan	Indian National Congress
Madras	General	P. Kakkan	Indian National Congress
Madras	General	P. Kunhiraman	Indian National Congress
Madras	General	P. L. Narasimha Raju	Indian National Congress
Madras	General	P. M. Velayudhapani	Indian National Congress
Madras	General	P. Subbarayan	Indian National Congress
Madras	General	Pattabhi Sitarainayya	Indian National Congress
Madras	General	Ramakrishna Ranga Rao	Indian National Congress
Madras	General	Raninath Goenka	Indian National Congress
Madras	General	S. H. Prater	Indian National Congress
Madras	General	S. Nagappa	Indian National Congress
Madras	General	T. A. Ramalingam Chettiar	Indian National Congress
Madras	General	T. J. M. Wilson	Indian National Congress
Madras	General	T. Prakasam	Indian National Congress
Madras	General	T. T. Krishnamachari	Indian National Congress
Madras	General	U. Srinivasa Mallayya	Indian National Congress
Madras	General	V. C. Kesava Rao	Indian National Congress
Madras	General	V. I. Muniswami Pillai	Indian National Congress
Madras	General	V. Nadimuthu Pillai	Indian National Congress
Madras	General	V. Subramaniam	Indian National Congress
Madras	Muslim	A. Mahabub Ali Baig	All-India Muslim League
Madras	Muslim	B. Poker	All-India Muslim League
Madras	Muslim	Haji Abdul Sathar H. Issaq Sait	All-India Muslim League
Madras	Muslim	K. T. M. Ahmed Ibrahim	All-India Muslim League
North West Frontier Province	Muslim	Abul Kalam Azad	Indian National Congress
North West Frontier Province	Muslim	Abdul Ghaffar Khan	Indian National Congress
North West Frontier Province	Muslim	Bahadur Khan	All-India Muslim League
Orissa	General	B. Das	Indian National Congress
Orissa	General	Biswanath Das	Indian National Congress
Orissa	General	Bodhram Dube	Indian National Congress
Orissa	General	Harekrishna Mahatab	Indian National Congress
Orissa	General	Malati Chowdhury	Indian National Congress
Orissa	General	Nanda Kishore Das	Indian National Congress
Orissa	General	Rajkrishna Bose	Indian National Congress
Orissa	General	Santanu Kumar Das	Indian National Congress
Orissa	General	Laxminarayan Sahu	Independent politician
Punjab	General	Bakhshi Sir Tek Chand	Indian National Congress
Punjab	General	Chaman Lal	Indian National Congress
Punjab	General	Gopi Chand Bhargava	Indian National Congress
Punjab	General	Mehr Chand Khanna	Indian National Congress
Punjab	General	Prithvi Singh Azad	Indian National Congress
Punjab	General	Shri Ram Sharma	Indian National Congress
Punjab	General	Chaudhri Harbhaj Ram	Unionist Party
Punjab	General	Rao Bahadur Chaudhri Suraj Mal	Unionist Party
Punjab	Muslim	Abdur Rab Nishtar	All-India Muslim League
Punjab	Muslim	Abu Bakar Ahmad Haleem	All-India Muslim League
Punjab	Muslim	Begum Jahan Ara Shah Nawaz	All-India Muslim League
Punjab	Muslim	Chaudhri Muhammad Hassan	All-India Muslim League
Punjab	Muslim	Feroz Khan Noon	All-India Muslim League
Punjab	Muslim	Ghazanfar Ali Khan	All-India Muslim League
Punjab	Muslim	Iftikhar Hussain Khan	All-India Muslim League
Punjab	Muslim	Khan Bahadur Chaudhri Nazir Ahmad Khan	All-India Muslim League
Punjab	Muslim	Khan Bahadur Sheikh Karamat Ali	All-India Muslim League
Punjab	Muslim	Mahomed Ali Jinnah	All-India Muslim League
Punjab	Muslim	Malik Omar Hayat	All-India Muslim League
Punjab	Muslim	Muhammad Iftikhar-ud-din	All-India Muslim League
Punjab	Muslim	Mumtaz Muhammad Khan Daultana	All-India Muslim League
Punjab	Muslim	Syed Amjad Ali	All-India Muslim League
Punjab	Muslim	Syed Ghulani Bhik Nairang	All-India Muslim League
Punjab	Muslim	Muzaffar Ali Khan Qazilbaslh	Unionist Party
Punjab	Sikh	Harnam Singh	Shiromani Akali Dal
Punjab	Sikh	Kartar Singh	Shiromani Akali Dal
Punjab	Sikh	Ujjal Singh	Shiromani Akali Dal
Punjab	Sikh	Pratap Singh	Indian National Congress
Sindh	General	Jairamdas Daulatram	Indian National Congress
Sindh	Muslim	Abdus Sattar	All-India Muslim League
Sindh	Muslim	M. A. Khuhro	All-India Muslim League
Sindh	Muslim	M. H. Gazdar	All-India Muslim League
United Provinces	General	A. Dharam Dass	Indian National Congress
United Provinces	General	Ajit Prasad Jain	Indian National Congress
United Provinces	General	Algu Rai Shastri	Indian National Congress
United Provinces	General	Balkrishna Sharma	Indian National Congress
United Provinces	General	Banshidhar Misra	Indian National Congress
United Provinces	General	Bhagwan Din	Indian National Congress
United Provinces	General	Damodar Swamp	Indian National Congress
United Provinces	General	Dayal Das Bhagat	Indian National Congress
United Provinces	General	Dharam Prakash	Indian National Congress
United Provinces	General	Feroz Gandhi	Indian National Congress
United Provinces	General	Gopal Narain	Indian National Congress
United Provinces	General	Gopinath Srivastava	Indian National Congress
United Provinces	General	Govind Ballabh Pant	Indian National Congress
United Provinces	General	Govind Malaviya	Indian National Congress
United Provinces	General	Hargovind Pant	Indian National Congress
United Provinces	General	Hariharnath Shastri	Indian National Congress
United Provinces	General	Hriday Nath Kunzru	Indian National Congress
United Provinces	General	J. B. Kripalani	Indian National Congress
United Provinces	General	Jaspat Rai Kapoor	Indian National Congress
United Provinces	General	Jawaharlal Nehru	Indian National Congress
United Provinces	General	Jogendra Singh	Indian National Congress
United Provinces	General	Jugal Kishore	Indian National Congress
United Provinces	General	Kailash Nath Katju	Indian National Congress
United Provinces	General	Kamala Chaudhuri	Indian National Congress
United Provinces	General	Kamlapati Tewari	Indian National Congress
United Provinces	General	Khurshed Lal	Indian National Congress
United Provinces	General	Maheswar Dayal Seth	Indian National Congress
United Provinces	General	Masuria Din	Indian National Congress
United Provinces	General	Mohan Lal Saxena	Indian National Congress
United Provinces	General	Phool Singh	Indian National Congress
United Provinces	General	Pragi Lal	Indian National Congress
United Provinces	General	Purnima Banerjee	Indian National Congress
United Provinces	General	Purshottamdas Tandan	Indian National Congress
United Provinces	General	R. V. Dhulekar	Indian National Congress
United Provinces	General	Ram Chandra Gupta	Indian National Congress
United Provinces	General	S. Radhakrishnan	Indian National Congress
United Provinces	General	Shibban Lal Saxena	Indian National Congress
United Provinces	General	Shri Krishna Dutt Paliwal	Indian National Congress
United Provinces	General	Sri Prakasa	Indian National Congress
United Provinces	General	Sucheta Kripalani	Indian National Congress
United Provinces	General	Sunder Lal	Indian National Congress
United Provinces	General	Venkatesh Narain Tewari	Indian National Congress
United Provinces	General	Vijaya Lakshmi Pandit	Indian National Congress
United Provinces	General	Vishambhar Dayal Tripathi	Indian National Congress
United Provinces	General	Jagannath Baksh Singh	Independent politician
United Provinces	General	Jwala Prasad Srivastava	Independent politician
United Provinces	General	Padampat Singhania	Independent politician
United Provinces	Muslim	Amir Haider Khan	All-India Muslim League
United Provinces	Muslim	Begum Aizaz Rasul	All-India Muslim League
United Provinces	Muslim	Chaudhuri Kaliquzzaman	All-India Muslim League
United Provinces	Muslim	Maulana Hasrat Mohani	All-India Muslim League
United Provinces	Muslim	Maulvi Aziz Ahmad Khan	All-India Muslim League
United Provinces	Muslim	Nawab Mohammad Ismail Khan	All-India Muslim League
United Provinces	Muslim	S. M. Rizwanullah	All-India Muslim League
United Provinces	Muslim	Rafi Ahmed Kidwai	Indian National Congress
Delhi	General	Deshbandhu Gupta	Indian National Congress

== Aftermath ==
Following the election, the Constituent Assembly of India was formed. Although the Indian National Congress, the majority party in the Assembly, initially accepted the Cabinet Mission's proposal, they later rejected it. As a result, Muslim nationalist All-India Muslim League boycotted the assembly sessions, and its leader Muhammad Ali Jinnah refused to participate in the assembly. On 2 September 1946, an interim government was formed under the leadership of Jawaharlal Nehru, leader of Indian National Congress. On 3 June 1947, British prime minister Clement Attlee announced in a statement on the transfer of power in British India that a new Constituent Assembly would be formed for the Indian Muslim state, proposed by All-India Muslim League, and that its members would be elected by the provincial legislatures based on the separate Constituent Assembly election. At that time, another Constituent Assembly election was held for India. After the independence of India in 1947, the elected members contributed to the drafting of the Constitution of India.
