= Nazimuddin government =

Central Government of Khwaja Nazimuddin
- 2nd Cabinet of Pakistan
- 1951–1953
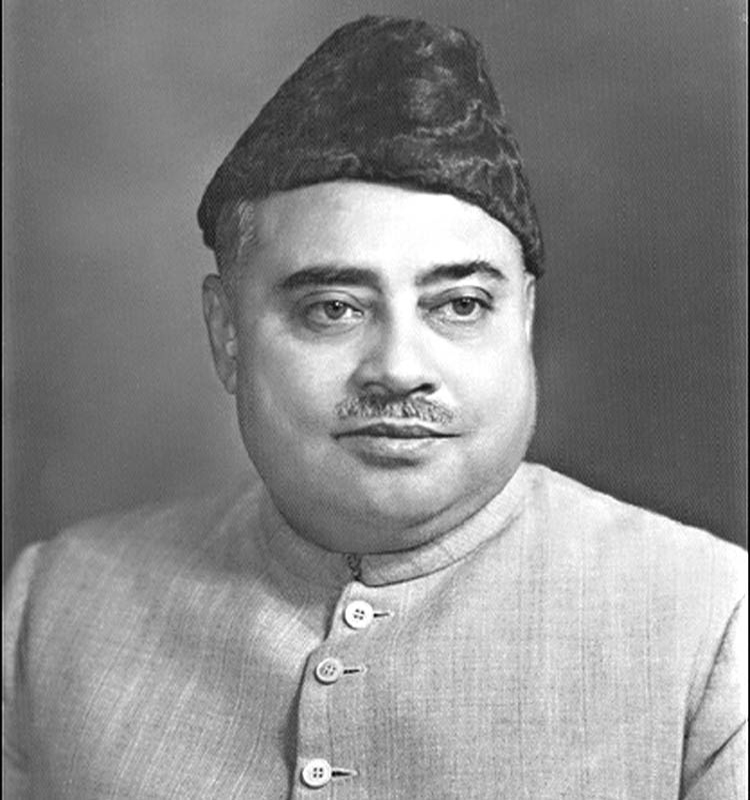
- Date formed: 19 October 1951
- Date dissolved: 17 April 1953

People and organisations
- Head of state: Ghulam Muhammad
- Head of government: Khwaja Nazimuddin
- Member party: Muslim League
- Opposition party: Pakistan National Congress
- Opposition leader: Basanta Kumar Das

History
- Election: 1947 Pakistani Constituent Assembly election
- Outgoing election: —
- Legislature terms: 1st Constituent Assembly of Pakistan
- Predecessor: Liaquat Ali Khan government
- Successor: Bogra government

Nazimuddin government was the second government and cabinet of Pakistan formed by Khwaja Nazimuddin on October 19, 1951.

During the Nazimuddin government, the foreign policy of Pakistan was formally independent, though a gradual inclination toward the United States became apparent. A confidential meeting of selected Cabinet members, including Zafrullah Khan, Choudhury Muhammad Ali, Abdur Rub Nishtar, and Ishtiaq Husain Qureshi, concluded that closer relations with Washington were necessary to solve economic and defence challenges of the country.

On 9 March 1953, Nazimuddin moved a resolution which was adopted by the Constituent Assembly of Pakistan following the death of Soviet leader Joseph Stalin, paying tribute to Stalin's leadership and foresight.

In April 1953, Governor-General Ghulam Mohammad dismissed the government of Prime Minister Khwaja Nazimuddin, citing failures in maintaining law and order and in managing an economic crisis associated with food shortages. During Nazimuddin's tenure, the law and order situation deteriorated following the anti-Ahmadi movement, which escalated into violence and resulted in the imposition of martial law in Lahore.

== Cabinet ==
=== Federal ministers ===
Minister	Portfolio	Period
Khwaja Nazimuddin	Defence	24 October 1951 to 17 April 1953
Sir Zafrulla Khan	Foreign Affairs & Commonwealth Relations	24 October 1951 to 17 April 1953
Fazlur Rahman	1. Commerce; 2. Education; 3. Economic Affairs	24 October 1951 to 17 April 1953; 24 October 1951 to 3 February 1953; 24 October 1951 to 17 April 1953
Chaudhri Muhammad Ali	Finance	24 October 1951 to 17 April 1953
Abdus Sattar Pirzada	1. Food; 2. Agriculture; 3. Law	24 October 1951 to 17 April 1953
Khawaja Shahabuddin	1. Interior; 2. Information & Broadcasting	24 October 1951 to 26 November 1951
Mushtaq Ahmed Gurmani	1. Kashmir Affairs; 2. Interior; 3. States & Frontier Regions	24 October 1951 to 26 November 1951; 26 November 1951 to 17 April 1953; 26 November 1951 to 17 April 1953
Sardar Bahadur Khan	Communications	24 October 1951 to 17 April 1953
Abdul Motaleb Malik	1. Labour; 2. Health; 3. Works	24 October 1951 to 17 April 1953
Sardar Abdur Rab Nishtar	Industries	26 October 1951 to 17 April 1953
Mahmud Husain	1. Kashmir Affairs; 2. Education	26 November 1951 to 17 April 1953; 4 February 1953 to 17 April 1953
Ishtiaq Hussain Qureshi	1. Refugees & Rehabilitation; 2. Information & Broadcasting	26 November 1951 to 17 April 1953; 26 November 1951 to 17 April 1953

=== Ministers of State ===
Minister	Portfolio	Period
Mahmud Husain	1. Defence; 2. States & Frontier Regions	24 October 1951 to 26 November 1951
Ishtiaq Hussain Qureshi	Refugees & Rehabilitation	24 October 1951 to 26 November 1951
Azizuddin Ahmad	Minority Affairs	24 October 1951 to 17 April 1953
Ghayasuddin Pathan	1. Finance; 2. Parliamentary Affairs	19 August 1952 to 17 April 1953
Syed Khalil-ur-Rehman	Defence	19 August 1952 to 17 April 1953

=== Deputy minister ===
Minister	Portfolio	Period
Ghayasuddin Pathan	Finance	24 October 1951 to 19 August 1952
