= Ministry of Talents =

Central Government of Mohammad Ali Bogra
- 3rd Cabinet of Pakistan
- 1953–1955
- Date formed: 17 April 1953
- Date dissolved: 11 August 1955

People and organisations
- Head of state: Ghulam Muhammad
- Head of government: Mohammad Ali Bogra
- Member party: Muslim League
- Opposition party: Awami League
- Opposition leader: Huseyn Shaheed Suhrawardy

History
- Election: 1955 Pakistani Constituent Assembly election
- Outgoing election: 1947 Pakistani Constituent Assembly election
- Legislature terms: 2nd Constituent Assembly of Pakistan
- Predecessor: Nazimuddin administration
- Successor: Chaudhry Muhammad Ali government

The Ministry of Talents, also known as Bogra administration, was the third government and cabinet of Pakistan formed by Mohammad Ali Bogra on 17 April 1953 and later expanded on 24 October 1954.

During the Bogra government, the Cabinet took several decisions related to Pakistan–United States relations. During a visit by United States Secretary of State, John Foster Dulles, the Cabinet determined that Pakistan would not enter into any arrangement obligating it to participate in a war in the event of an attack on NATO countries.

The Cabinet also agreed that Pakistan's position would take into account the extent to which its disputes with India were addressed. In addition, it decided that the Commander-in-Chief would be permitted to meet with Dulles to exchange information, while policy decisions would remain the responsibility of the Cabinet.

== Cabinet ==
=== First cabinet (17 April 1953 – 24 October 1954) ===
==== Federal ministers ====
Minister	Portfolio	Period
Mohammad Ali Bogra	1. Commerce; 2. Defence; 3. Information & Broadcasting	17 April 1953 to 7 December 1953; 17 April 1953 to 24 October 1954; 30 May 1954 to 5 September 1954
Sir Zafrulla Khan	Foreign Affairs & Commonwealth Relations	17 April 1953 to 24 October 1954
Chaudhri Muhammad Ali	1. Finance; 2. Economic Affairs	17 April 1953 to 24 October 1954
Mushtaq Ahmed Gurmani	1. Interior; 2. States & Frontier Regions	17 April 1953 to 24 October 1954
Sardar Bahadur Khan	Communications	17 April 1953 to 24 October 1954
Abdul Motaleb Malik	1. Labour; 2. Health; 3. Works	17 April 1953 to 24 October 1954
Ishtiaq Hussain Qureshi	Education	17 April 1953 to 24 October 1954
A. K. Brohi	1. Law; 2. Parliamentary Affairs; 3. Minority Affairs; 4. Information & Broadcasting	17 April 1953 to 24 October 1954; 17 April 1953 to 7 December 1953; 5 September 1954 to 14 October 1954
Khan Abdul Qayyum Khan	1. Food; 2. Agriculture; 3. Industries; 4. Commerce	18 April 1953 to 24 October 1954; 18 April 1953 to 24 October 1954; 18 April 1953 to 24 October 1954; 4 October 1954 to 24 October 1954
Shuaib Qureshi	1. Information & Broadcasting; 2. Commerce	18 April 1953 to 30 May 1954; 18 April 1953 to 24 October 1954
Tafazzal Ali	1. Refugees & Rehabilitation; 2. Kashmir Affairs	7 December 1953 to 4 October 1954

==== Ministers of State ====
Minister	Portfolio	Period
Ghayasuddin Pathan	1. Agriculture; 2. Minority Affairs	7 December 1953 to 24 October 1954
Sardar Amir Azam Khan	1. Parliamentary Affairs; 2. Defence	7 December 1953 to 24 October 1954
Murtaza Raza Choudhry	Finance	7 December 1953 to 24 October 1954

=== Reconstituted cabinet (24 October 1954 – 11 August 1955) ===
==== Federal ministers (reconstituted cabinet) ====
Minister	Portfolio	Period
Mohammad Ali Bogra	1. Foreign Affairs & Commonwealth Relations; 2. Communications; 3. Health	24 October 1954 to 11 August 1955; 24 October 1954 to 4 November 1954; 24 October 1954 to 11 August 1955
Chaudhri Muhammad Ali	1. Finance; 2. Economic Affairs; 3. Refugees & Rehabilitation; 4. Kashmir Affairs	24 October 1954 to 11 August 1955; 24 October 1954 to 4 November 1954; 24 October 1954 to 6 November 1954
Abdul Motaleb Malik	1. Labour; 2. Health; 3. Works	24 October 1954 to 11 August 1955; 24 October 1954 to 20 January 1955; 24 October 1954 to 11 August 1955
Abul Hassan Ispahani	1. Industries; 2. Commerce	24 October 1954 to 11 August 1955; 24 October 1954 to 20 December 1954
Iskander Mirza	1. Interior; 2. States & Frontier Regions; 3. Kashmir Affairs	24 October 1954 to 7 August 1955; 6 November 1954 to 20 January 1955
Ayub Khan	Defence	24 October 1954 to 11 August 1955
Ghayasuddin Pathan	1. Food; 2. Agriculture; 3. Minority Affairs; 4. Parliamentary Affairs; 5. Law	24 October 1954 to 15 January 1955; 24 October 1954 to 11 August 1955; 24 October 1954 to 20 December 1954
Mir Ghulam Ali Talpur	1. Information & Broadcasting; 2. Education	24 October 1954 to 12 January 1955; 24 October 1954 to 18 March 1955
Khan Sahib	Communications	4 November 1954 to 11 August 1955
Habib Ibrahim Rahimtoola	Commerce	20 December 1954 to 11 August 1955
Huseyn Suhrawardy	Law	20 December 1954 to 11 August 1955
Syed Abid Hussain Shah	1. Food; 2. Education	15 January 1955 to 11 August 1955; 25 March 1955 to 11 August 1955
Sardar Mumtaz Ali Khan	1. Information & Broadcasting; 2. Kashmir Affairs	12 January 1955 to 11 August 1955; 20 January 1955 to 11 August 1955
Abu Hussain Sarkar	Health	20 January 1955 to 6 June 1955

==== Ministers of State (reconstituted cabinet) ====
Minister	Portfolio	Period
Sardar Amir Azam Khan	1. Refugees & Rehabilitation; 2. Defence	4 November 1954 to 11 August 1955; 24 November 1954 to 11 August 1955
Murtaza Raza Choudhry	Finance	24 October 1954 to 11 August 1955
