= 1947 Pakistani Constituent Assembly election =

1947 indirect election in British India

1947 Pakistan Constituent Assembly election
- July 1947

69 seats in the Constituent Assembly of Pakistan 35 seats needed for a majority
- Registered: 425
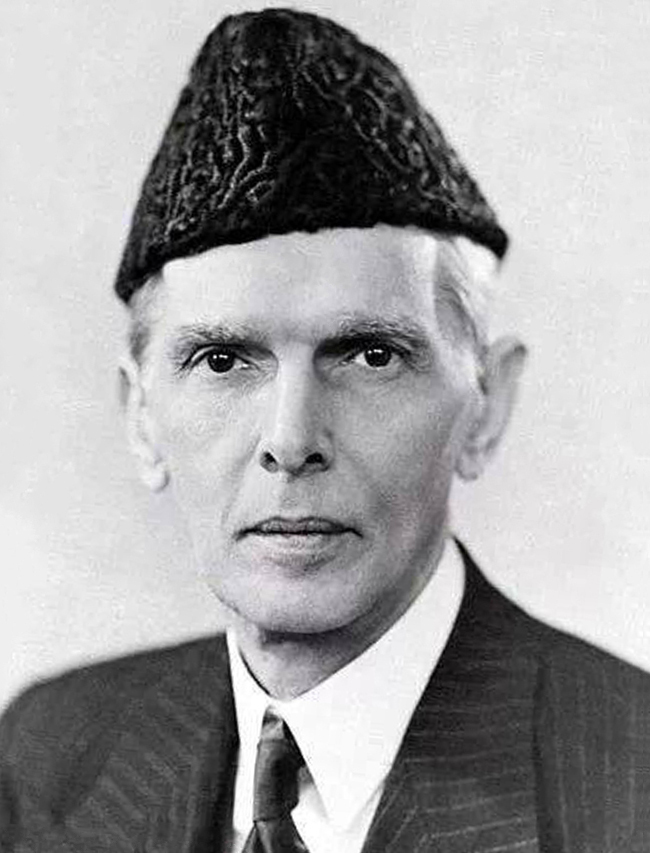

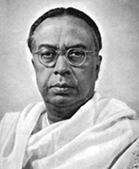
	First party	Second party
Leader	Muhammad Ali Jinnah	Kiran Shankar Roy
Party	AIML	INC
Leader since	1937	1947
Last election	73	208
Seats won	59	9
Seat change	▼14	▼199
Head of the Interim Government of British India before election
Jawaharlal Nehru
INC
Prime Minister of Pakistan
Liaquat Ali Khan
AIML

Before the independence of Pakistan in 1947, members of the first term of the Constituent Assembly of Pakistan were elected through an indirect election held after June by the votes of the members of the legislative assemblies of Assam, Bengal, and Punjab. Representatives from Baluchistan, the North-West Frontier, and Sind were taken directly through the earlier 1946 Constituent Assembly elections.

== Background ==
In 1946, after the provincial elections were held in British India, the British government sent a Cabinet Mission to the colony. The mission proposed the formation of an Indian confederacy, where autonomous states would have the authority to frame their own constitutions in unitary groups. Following the Constituent Assembly election later that year, the Constituent Assembly of India was formed. Indian National Congress, the largest member party, initially accepted the mission's proposal but later the party's leader Jawaharlal Nehru rejected it. As a result, the Muslim nationalist All-India Muslim League boycotted the assembly sessions, and its leader Muhammad Ali Jinnah refused to participate in the assembly. On 3 June 1947, the then British prime minister Clement Attlee announced the plan for the transfer of power and proposed the formation of a separate Constituent Assembly for the proposed state for Indian Muslims. He also declared that members of the proposed assembly would be elected by the votes of provincial legislative assembly members.

== Planning ==
After the vote by members of the Bengal Legislative Assembly on 20 June in favor of the partition of Bengal, the following day it was announced that the date for submitting nominations for the Constituent Assembly elections in the Bengal region would be 30 June, and the election would be held in 5 July. Meanwhile, in 23 June, after the members of Punjab Legislative Assembly voted in favor of the partition of Punjab, elections were announced to be held around July in the Punjab region. In 22 July, it was announced that the legislative seats of Assam Province had been divided into Group A and Group B for the elections. From Group B's 29 seats, 3 members (including 2 Muslims) would be elected to the new Constituent Assembly by a vote among the members. In 30 July, candidates from Assam submitted their nomination papers, and it was announced that the election for the province would be held on 2 August 1947 at the legislative building in Shillong, the provincial capital.

== Results ==
On 26 July, the names of 66 elected members from East Bengal, West Punjab, Sindh, North-West Frontier Province, and Baluchistan were announced. Among those elected, 48 were Muslims and 2 were Sikhs. From East Bengal, 41 members were elected; from West Punjab, 17; from Sindh, 4; from the North-West Frontier Province, 3; and from Baluchistan, 1 member. Separate elections were not held for Sindh, the North-West Frontier Province, and Baluchistan; instead, members elected earlier to the Indian Constituent Assembly were directly taken as representatives. Out of the total elected members, 59 belonged to the All-India Muslim League.

Party	Votes	%	Seats
All-India Muslim League			59
Indian National Congress			9
Independents			1
Total			69
Registered voters/turnout	425	–	

== Aftermath ==
On 28 July 1947, general secretary Liaquat Ali Khan convened a meeting of the All-India Muslim League members at the legislative building in Karachi for the Constituent Assembly. In 9 August, Kiran Shankar Roy and Bhim Sen Sachar were selected as the parliamentary leader and parliamentary deputy leader respectively of the Indian National Congress, the opposition party in the new Constituent Assembly. In 10 August, Muhammad Ali Jinnah was elected president of the Constituent Assembly. On 14 August 1947, Pakistan gained independence from British Empire. On the following day, under the leadership of Liaquat Ali Khan, the first federal cabinet of Pakistan was formed.
