= Liaquat Ali Khan government =

First government of Pakistan

Central Government of Liaquat Ali Khan
- 1st Federal of Pakistan
- 1947–1951
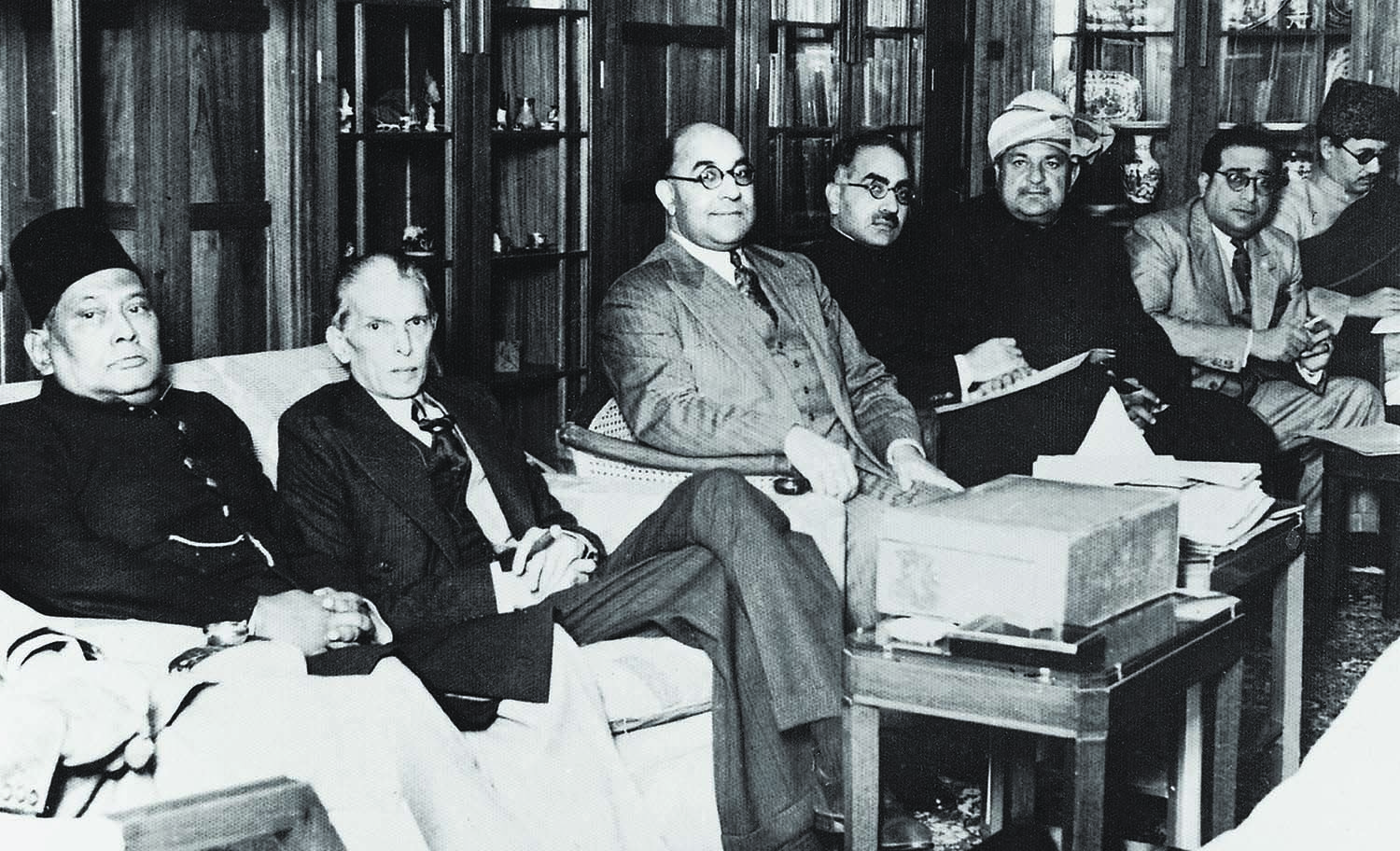
- Members of the government, with Liaquat Ali Khan himself sat at the center, and Governor-General Jinnah to his left.
- Date formed: 15 August 1947
- Date dissolved: 16 October 1951

People and organisations
- Governor-General: Muhammad Ali Jinnah; Khawaja Nazimuddin
- Head of government: Liaquat Ali Khan
- Member party: Muslim League
- Status in legislature: Absolute majority 100 / 100 (100%)
- Opposition party: Pakistan National Congress

History
- Election: 1947 Pakistani Constituent Assembly election
- Outgoing election: 1946 Indian Constituent Assembly election
- Legislature terms: 1st Constituent Assembly of Pakistan
- Predecessor: Provisional government
- Successor: Nazimuddin government

The Liaquat Ali Khan government, commonly abbreviated as the L.A Khan government or Ali Khan administration was the first government and cabinet of Pakistan (Note: From 1947 to 1956, Pakistan was known as the Dominion of Pakistan.) which ruled from 1947 to 1951, and was led by Liaquat Ali Khan.

The government was founded on 15 August 1947, almost immediately after the Partition of India and Pakistan's independence. The founder of Pakistan, Muhammad Ali Jinnah tasked Liaquat Ali Khan, a leading figure in Pakistan's independence to form an administration and consolidate the new Pakistani governments’ control, while Jinnah himself opted for the more the ceremonial position of head of state (Governor-General).

The administration would be led by the newly formed Muslim League, while the cabinet would be composed of several Pakistan movement activists and members of the Muslim League. The government's main focus was recovering from the bloody partition of India, which took the lives of over 1 million people. The government also faced increasing challenges from Communist opposition, Princely state annexations and mainly the outbreak of war with India. The government tenure of Liaquat Ali Khan oversaw the consolidation of the new state of ‘Pakistan’, he did so effectively by laying the administrative groundwork for Pakistan's constitution in the 1949 Objectives Resolution.

Liaquat's government would not function as a democracy; instead Muslim League-rule was implemented. The legislature of the government would consist of the Constituent Assembly of Pakistan. The governor-general, Jinnah died in 1948 and was replaced by Khawaja Nazimuddin who ruled till the governments end in 1951.

The government would dissolve in 1951, when Liaquat Ali Khan would be assassinated under mysterious circumstances. Governor-general Khawaja Nazimuddin would then take office as second prime minister of Pakistan and would form the second government in Pakistan's history after Liaquat died, though the same cabinet and constituent assembly continued from Liaquat's government.

== Cabinet composition ==
Liaquat Ali Khan's cabinet, called the Ali Khan Cabinet consisted of many seasoned politicians, statesmen and activists of the Pakistan Movement, with Liaquat himself regarded as a seasoned politician.

Upon the cabinet's formation, Liaquat Ali Khan, alongside his already existing role as prime minister, assumed the roles of Minister for Foreign Affairs, Minister of Defence, and Minister of States and Frontier Regions. Though, as the government and cabinet progressed, these roles were handed over to multiple diverse ministers.

The Ali Khan Cabinet
Ministerial office	Officer holder	Term	Party
Prime Minister	Liaquat Ali Khan	1947–1951	ML
Foreign Affairs	Sir Zafrullah Khan	1947–1954	ML
Treasury, Economic	Malik Ghulam	1947–1954	IND
Law, Justice, Labor	Jogendra Nath Mandal	1947–1951	ML
Interior	Khwaja Shahabuddin	1948–1951	ML
Defence	Iskander Mirza	1947–1954	ML
Science advisor	Salimuzzaman Siddiqui	1951–1959	N/A (Note: Siddiqui was a scientist and not a politician, he was invited to the cabinet for his scientific skill rather than for political purposes.)
Education, Health	Fazal Ilahi Chaudhry	1947–1956	ML
Finance, Statistics	Sir Victor Turner	1947–1951	N/A (Note: Victor Turner was a civil servant and economist, therefore he cannot be classified as a politician (or an independent one) and was invited to the cabinet on special financial matters.)
Minorities, Women	Sheila Irene Pant	1947–1951	N/A (Note: Sheila was a stateswoman and the wife of the prime minister, hence she was invited to the cabinet, though she was not an active member of the Muslim League.)
Communications	Abdur Rab Nishtar	1947–1951	ML

== History ==
=== Timeline ===
On 14 August 1947, The Partition of India began as Pakistan was declared as an independent state and Jinnah was placed as Pakistan's first Governor-General. Following this on 15 August 1947, Muhammad Ali Jinnah and Liaquat Ali Khan formed an administration, Liaquat Ali Khan was sworn in as first prime minister of Pakistan. Ministries, cabinets and the government were all formed. In the following months of the governments formation, refugees from the partition were taken, courts, juries, agencies and positions were established, relations and embassies with foreign nations were also established.

In October 1947, following tensions skyrocketing between the Dominions of India and Pakistan over the princely state of Jammu & Kashmir, the Indo-Pakistani war of 1947-48 broke out.

On 11 September 1948, Muhammad Ali Jinnah, Governor-General died in office due to tuberculosis. Four days later, on 14 September 1948, Khawaja Nazimuddin is chosen as the second governor-general of Pakistan following Jinnah's death.

On 1 January 1949, the Indo-Pakistani war of 1947-48 officially ended with a proclamation of a ceasefire by the United Nations.

On 7 March 1949, Prime Minister Liaquat Ali Khan presented the Objectives Resolution unto the Constituent assembly of Pakistan, Out of 75 members of the assembly, 21 voted for opposing it. All the amendments proposed by minority members were rejected. Consequently, all ten of them voted against it. The resolution was passed and laid the groundwork for Pakistan's future constitutions.

In March 1951, members of the Communist Party of Pakistan plotted to overthrow the L.A Khan government in the Rawalpindi Conspiracy. The plot failed and the conspirators were arrested by Liaquat's government law enforcement.

On 16 October 1951, Prime minister Liaquat Ali Khan is shot twice and dies in office due to his injuries, dissolving the government.

== Legislature ==
The first unicameral legislature of Pakistan formed after the partition of India. There were 100 Members of Parliament, including 44 from East Bengal, 17 from West Punjab, 3 from the Northwest Frontier Province, 4 from Sindh, and 1 from Balochistan. Four of West Punjab's 17 allocated seats were laid vacant.

== Additional Sources ==
K. Sarwar Hasan, 1951. THE FOREIGN POLICY OF MR. LIAQUAT ALI KHAN
