= 1945 Indian general election =

- December 1945

102 elected seats 52 seats needed for a majority
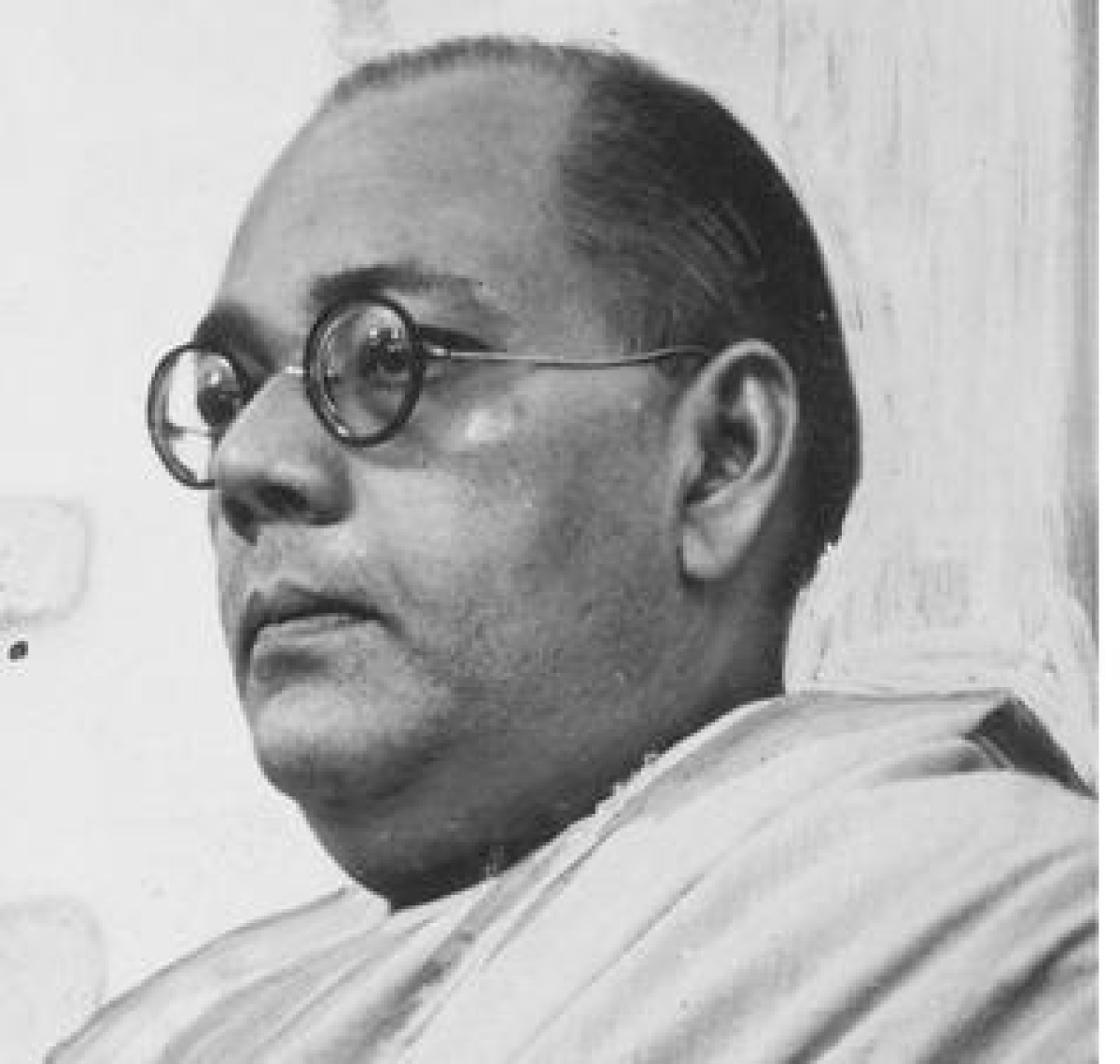

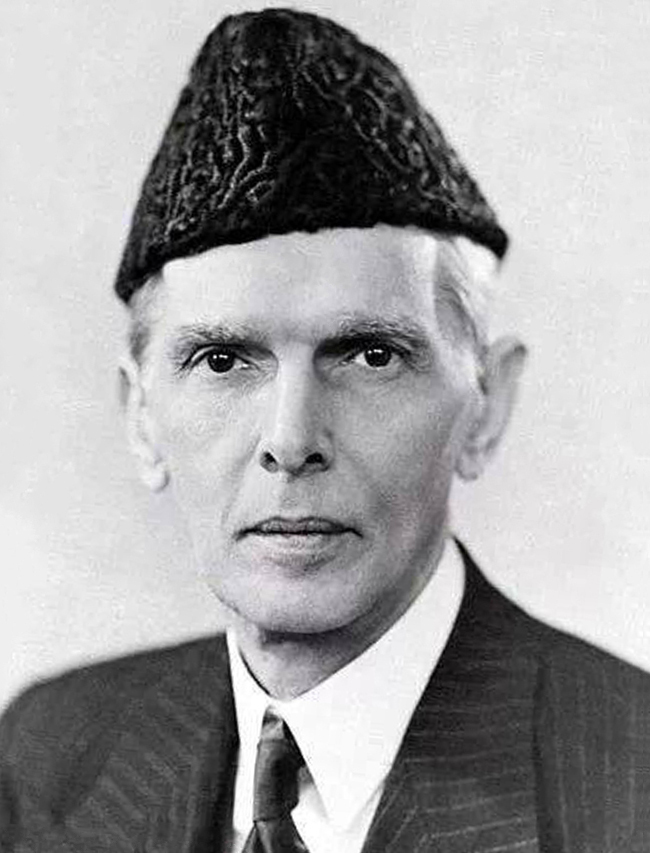
	First party	Second party
Leader	Sarat Chandra Bose	Muhammad Ali Jinnah
Party	INC	AIML
Seats won	57	30
Seat change	▲15	▲30

General elections were held in British India in December 1945 to elect members of the Central Legislative Assembly and the Council of State. Election under Government of India Act 1935 were held with limited franchise and only around 10% of the population in direct British controlled provinces were eligible to vote based on their income and property. The Indian National Congress emerged as the largest party, winning 57 of the 102 elected seats. The Muslim League won all Muslim constituencies, but failed to win any other seats. Of the 13 remaining seats, 8 went to Europeans, 3 to independents, and 2 to Akali candidates in the Sikh constituencies of Punjab. This election coupled with the provincial one in 1946 proved to be a strategic victory for Jinnah and the partitionists. Even though Congress won, the League had united the Muslim vote and as such it gained the negotiating power to seek a separate Muslim homeland as it became clear that a united India would prove highly unstable. The elected members later formed the Constituent Assembly of India.

These were the last general elections in British India, subsequent elections in Independent India were held in 1951.

== Background ==
On 19 September 1945, the Viceroy Lord Wavell announced that elections to the central and provincial legislatures would be held in December 1945 to January 1946. It was also announced that an executive council would be formed and a constitution-making body would be convened after these elections.

Although the Government of India Act 1935 had proposed an all-India federation, it could not take place because the government held that the Princely states were unwilling to join it. Consequently, rather than choosing 375 members, only 102 elective seats were to be filled. Hence the elections to the central legislature were held under the terms of the Government of India Act 1919.

== Results ==
=== Central Legislative Assembly ===
Party	Seats
Indian National Congress	57
All-India Muslim League	30
Akali Dal	2
Europeans	8
Independents	5
Total	102
Source: Schwartzberg Atlas

One Independent member from Bengal representing the Commerce Constituency (Bengal Mahajan Sabha) had after his election joined the INC changing the tally of the INC to 58 and Independents to 4.

=== Membership by province ===
Province	Europeans	Independent	Minor parties	Congress (General/Non-Muhammadan)	Congress (Non-General)	Muslim League	Total
Assam	1	0		2		1	4
Ajmer-Merwara				1			1
Bengal	3	1		6	1	6	17
Bihar		1		6		3	10
Orissa				2			2
Bombay	2	1		6	2	3	14
Central Provinces				4	1	1	6
Delhi				1			1
Madras	1			10	2	3	16
North West Frontier Province					1	0	1
Punjab		1	2 (Akali Dal)	3		6	12
Sind				1		1	2
United Provinces	1	1		8		6	16
Total	8	5	2	50	7	30	102

== Members of the Central Legislative Assembly ==
- President: Ganesh Vasudev Mavalankar
- Deputy President: Sir Muhammad Yamin Khan
- Secretary: M. N. Kaul
- Deputy Secretary: M. V. H. Collins
- Assistant Secretary: A. J. M. Atkinson
- Marshal: Khan Bahadur Sardar Nur Ahmed Khan

=== Nominated members ===
- Nominated Officials: Pandit Jawaharlal Nehru, Liaquat Ali Khan, Sardar Vallabhbhai Patel, Ibrahim Ismail Chundrigar, Asaf Ali, Chakravarti Rajagopalachari, Doctor John Matthai, Jagjivan Ram, Jogendra Nath Mandal, Sir George Spence, Samuel Harrison Yardley Oulsnam, Binay Ranjan Sen, Balwant Singh Puri, S. C. Joshi, Krishnanath Ganesh Ambegaonkar, Ram Nath, M. V. Rangachari, Sir Wilfred Harold Shoobert, B. K. Gokhale, Govardhan Shankerlal Bhalja, Sir Pheroze Merwan Kharegat, Sir E. Ingoldsby
- Nominated Non-Officials: Frank R. Anthony, Lieutenant Colonel Doctor J. C. Chatterjee, Rao Bahadur Namasivayam Sivaraj, Maniben Kara, S. Guruswami, Sir Cowasji Jehangir, 2nd Baronet, Rai Bahadur D. M. Bhattacharya, Raja Saiyid Ahmed Ali Khan Alvi, Chaudhri Sir Chand, Khan Bahadur Sharbat Khan, Raja Bahadur Ramachandra Mardaraj Deo, Captain Sardar Harendra Singh, Doctor P. G. Solanki, Colonel Kumar Shri Himmatsinhji, Lieutenant Commander Aftab Ali, D. D. Howell Thomas (European), L. S. Vaidyanathan

=== Elected members ===
- Ajmer-Merwara: Mukat Behari Lal Bhargava
- Assam: Rohini Kumar Chaudhuri (Assam Valley General), Arun Kumar Chanda (Surma Valley cum Shillong General), Nawab Ali Asghar Khan (Muslim), P. J. Griffiths (European)
- Bengal: Sarat Chandra Bose, Nagendranath Mukherjee, Babu Debendra Lal Khan, Shashanka Shekhar Sanyal, Kshitish Chandra Neogy, Babu Satyapriya Banerjee, Abdur Rahman Siddiqui, Sir Hassan Suhrawardy, Maulvi Tamizuddin Khan (Dacca-cum-Mymensingh Muslim), Haji Chowdhury Muhammad Ismail Khan (Burdwan & Presidency Muslim), Shaikh Rafiuddin Ahmad Siddique (Chittagong Muslim), Shah Abdul Hamid (Rajshahi Muslim), Geoffrey W. Tyson (European), C. P. Lawson (European), M. A. F. Hirtzel (European), Babu Dhritikanta Lahiri Choudhury (Landholders), Ananda Mohan Poddar
- Bihar & Orissa: Satya Narayan Sinha (Darbhanga cum Saran General), Bepin Bihari Verma (Muzaffarpur-cum-Champaran General), Bhagirathi Mahapatra (Orissa General), Sri Jagannathdas (Orissa General), Ramayan Prasad, Gauri Shankar Saran Singh, Banarsi Prasad Jhunjhunwala (Bhagalpur, Purnea & Santhal districts General), Ram Narayan Singh (Hazaribagh General), Muhammad Nauman, Chowdhry Muhammad Abid Hussain, Khan Bahadur Habibur Rahman, Madan Dhari Singh
- Bombay: Dr. Gopalrao V. Deshmukh (Bombay City General), R. Masani, Sukhdev Udhavdas (Sind General), Ganesh Vasudev Mavalankar (Bombay Northern General), Ahmed Ebrahim Haroon Jaffer (Bombay Central Muslim), Narhar Vishnu Gadgil (Bombay Central General), B. S. Hiray, Dattatraya Parashuram Karmarkar (Bombay Southern General), Muhammad Ali Jinnah (Bombay City Muslim), Seth Abdullah Haroon (Sind Muslim), Mahomed Musa Killedar (Bombay Northern Muslim), H. G. Stokes (European), Leslie Gwilt (European), Manu Subedar, Sardar Narayanrao Ganpatrao Vinchoorkar, Vadilal Lallubhai
- Central Provinces and Berar: Prasadrao Keshavrao Salve, G. B. Dani, P. B. Gole, Seth Govind Das (Hindi Divisions), Khan Saheb Nawab Siddique Ali Khan (Muslim), Seth Sheodass Daga (Landholders)
- Delhi: Asaf Ali
- Madras: Ammu Swaminathan, N. Narayana Murthy, V. Gangaraju, Nayukulu Gogineni Ranga (Guntur-cum-Nellore General), Madabhushi Ananthasayanam Ayyangar (Madras ceded districts & Chittoor General), V. C. Vellingiri Gounder, R. Venkatasubba Reddiar, T. V. Satakopa Chari, S. T. Adityan, A. Karunakara Menon, Muhammad Rahmatullah, J. Jamal Moideen Saib, Haji Abdul Sathar Haji Essak Seit (West Coast & Nilgiris Muslim), Ralph Camroux Morris (European), M. K. Jinachandran, Tiruppur Angappa Ramalingam Chettiar (Salem & Coimbatore cum North Arcot General)
- NWFP: Abdul Ghaffar Khan
- Punjab: Thakur Das Bhargava, Raizada Hans Raj (Jullundur General), Diwan Chaman Lall (West Punjab General), Syed Ghulam Bhik Nairang (East Punjab Muslim), Zafar Ali Khan (East Central Punjab Muslim), Hafiz Mohammad Abdullah (West Central Punjab Muslim), Nawab Sahibzada Sayed Sir Muhammad Mehr Shah (North Punjab Muslim), Muhammad yousaf khan Golra[North punjab muslim], Syed Abid Hussain Shah, Khan Bahadur Makhdum Syed Sher Shah Jeelani, Sardar Mangal Singh (East Punjab Sikh), Sardar Sampuran Singh (West Punjab Sikh), Squadron Leader Sardar Surjit Singh Majithia
- United Provinces: Pandit Balkrishna Sharma, Krishna Chandra Sharma, Pandit Sri Krishna Dutta Paliwal (Agra General), Seth Damodar Swaroop, Pandit Govind Malaviya, Sri Prakasa (Allahabad & Jhansi General), Mohanlal Saksena, Sardar Jogendra Singh, Muhammad Ismail Khan, Sir Muhammad Yamin Khan (Agra Muslim), Nawabzada Liaquat Ali Khan, Khan Bahadur Hafiz M. Ghazanfarulla, Doctor Sir Ziauddin Ahmad (UP Southern Muslim), Khan Bahadur Raja Mohammad Amir Ahmad Khan, A. C. Inskip (European), Sir Vijaya Ananda

== See also ==
- Interim Government of India
