= 1972 Gird by-election =

State assembly by-election in Madhya Pradesh, India

Gird seat in the Madhya Pradesh Legislative Assembly by-election, 1972
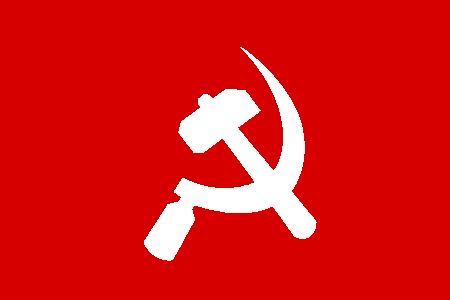
Candidate	Balkrishna Sharma	Maheshdutta Mishra
Party	CPI	ABJS
Popular vote	12,704	11,915
Percentage	43.63%	40.92%

In June 1972 a by-election was held in for the Gird seat of the Legislative Assembly of the Indian state of Madhya Pradesh. The by-election was called after the resignation of the sitting MLA Vijaya Raje Scindia.

Scindia, once the Rajmata of Gwalior, had won both the Gird Legislative Assembly seat as well the Bhind seat of the Lok Sabha (lower house of the parliament of India) in the 1971 general election by impressive margins, standing for the Bharatiya Jana Sangh (BJS). In the March 1972 Madhya Pradesh Legislative Assembly election in Gird she defeated the Indian National Congress candidate Ghuraiya Sarnamsingh with a margin of over 12,000 votes. After the elections she had to choose between the two posts, and decided to retain her Lok Sabha seat and resigned from the Gird Legislative Assembly seat. At the time Gird was seen as a Scindia-BJS stronghold.

The main contenders of the by-election were Maheshdutta Mishra and Balkrishna Sharma. Mishra was the candidate put forth by Scindia and represented the BJS. Scindia and other prominent BJS personalities conducted speaking tours across the vast constituency to support Mishra's candidacy, at least 50 jeeps were used the purpose. Sharma was a Communist Party of India leader with 35 years experience in working with the peasant movement in the area. The Indian National Congress had declared its support for Sharma's candidature, but local Congress leaders in Gwalior offered little support for him.

The election was held on 5 June 1972. Sharma narrowly won the seat, largely due to support from the peasants. He got 12,704 votes compared to 11,915 votes for Mishra. There were also six independent candidates in the fray; B. Kushwah (1,868 votes), J. Raosahib (1,682 votes), Nathu (238 votes), Roopchand (110 votes) and G. Sharma (70 votes). All independent candidates lost their deposits.

The French scholar Christophe Jaffrelot argued that "[t]he victory of the people's candidate over that of the 'palace' was the abiding image of this contest. Nor must one forget that it happened after the passing of a law establishing a ceiling of 10 acres on landholdings owned by individuals and 15 acres on those owned by families of five individuals, a measure which Congress had promised before the elections and was supported by the CPI." According to the publication Link the election outcome was "a significant event in the anti-feudal wind blowing in the northern districts of Madhya Pradesh". The election sparked internal dissent within the BJS, with some sectors beginning to call for a break with the relationship with the Scindias.

== Detailed result ==
1972 Gird by-election
Party	Candidate	Votes	%	±%
CPI	Balkrishna Sharma	12,704	43.63	
ABJS	Maheshdutta Mishra	11,915	40.92	
Independent	B. Kushwah	1,868		
Independent	J. Raosahib	1,682		
Independent	R. M. Singh	527		
Independent	Nathu	238		
Independent	Roopchand	110		
Independent	G. Sharma	70		
CPI gain from ABJS		Swing		
