= Mahesh Dutta Mishra (Gird politician) =

Indian politician

Mahesh Dutta Mishra, an Indian politician. He was the son of Balwant Parshad Mishra and hailed from Barai village in Gird district.

Mishra contested the Ghatigaon constituency in the 1951-52 Madhya Bharat Legislative Assembly election as an independent. He finished in second place with 6,348 votes (41.68%). After the election Mishra charged that there had been irregularities.

He won the Gird seat in the 1962 Madhya Pradesh Legislative Assembly election, obtaining 11,184 votes (38.40%). In this election he stood as an Indian National Congress candidate. Amongst his opponents were Sarnam Singh of the Praja Socialist Party and Balkrishna Sharma of the Communist Party of India.

Ten years later, Mishra again stood as a candidate for the Gird seat in a June 1972 by-election. He was the candidate of the Bharatiya Jana Sangh and was supported by Vijaya Raje Scindia. He got 11,915 votes, being defeated with a margin of 789 votes by Balkrishna Sharma of the CPI.
