= 1946 Indian provincial elections =

- 1946

1585 provincial seats contested
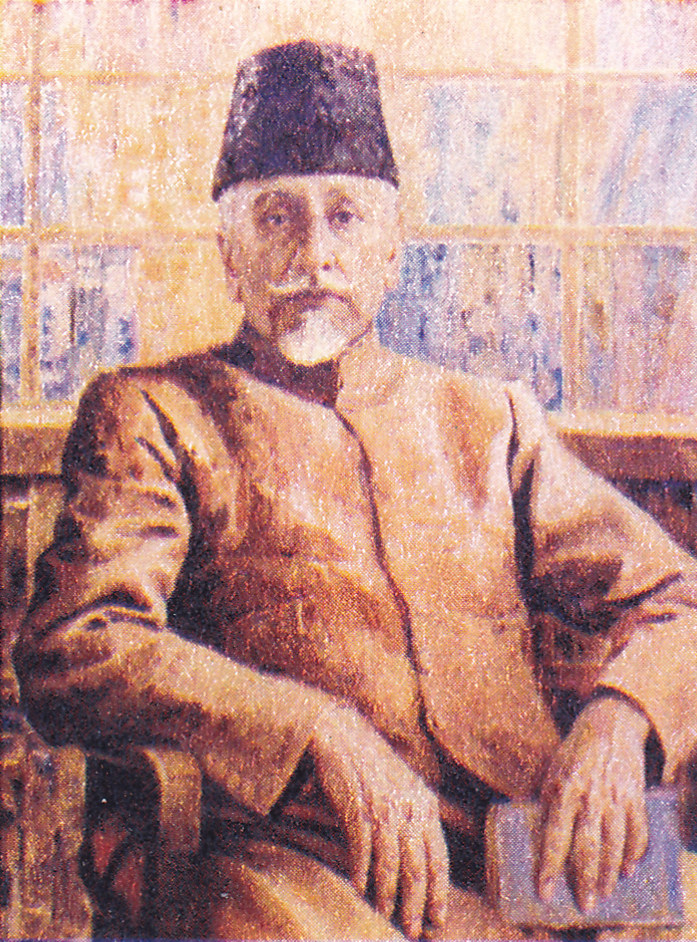

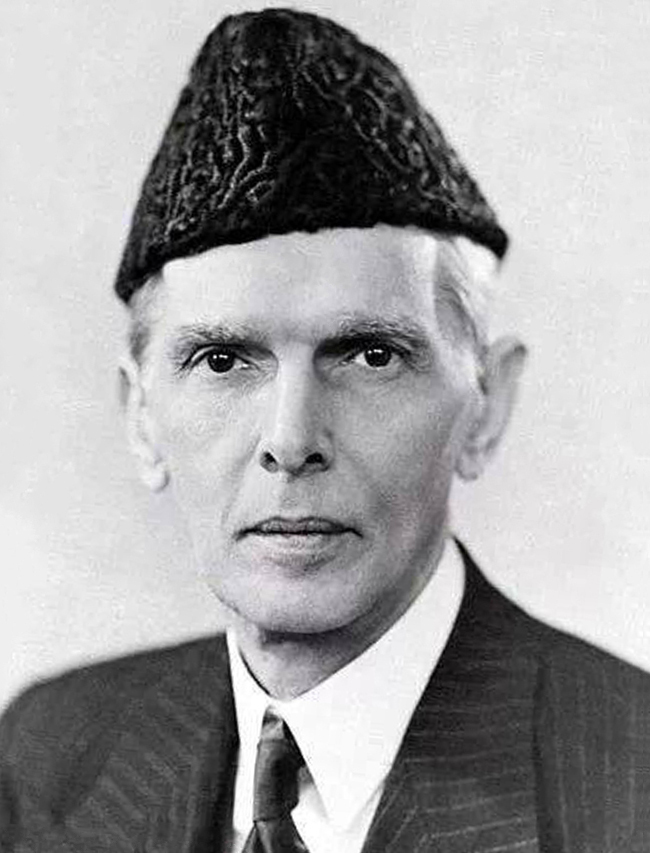
	First party	Second party
Leader	Abul Kalam Azad	Muhammad Ali Jinnah
Party	INC	AIML
Leader's seat	Did not contest	Byculla
Seats won	923	425
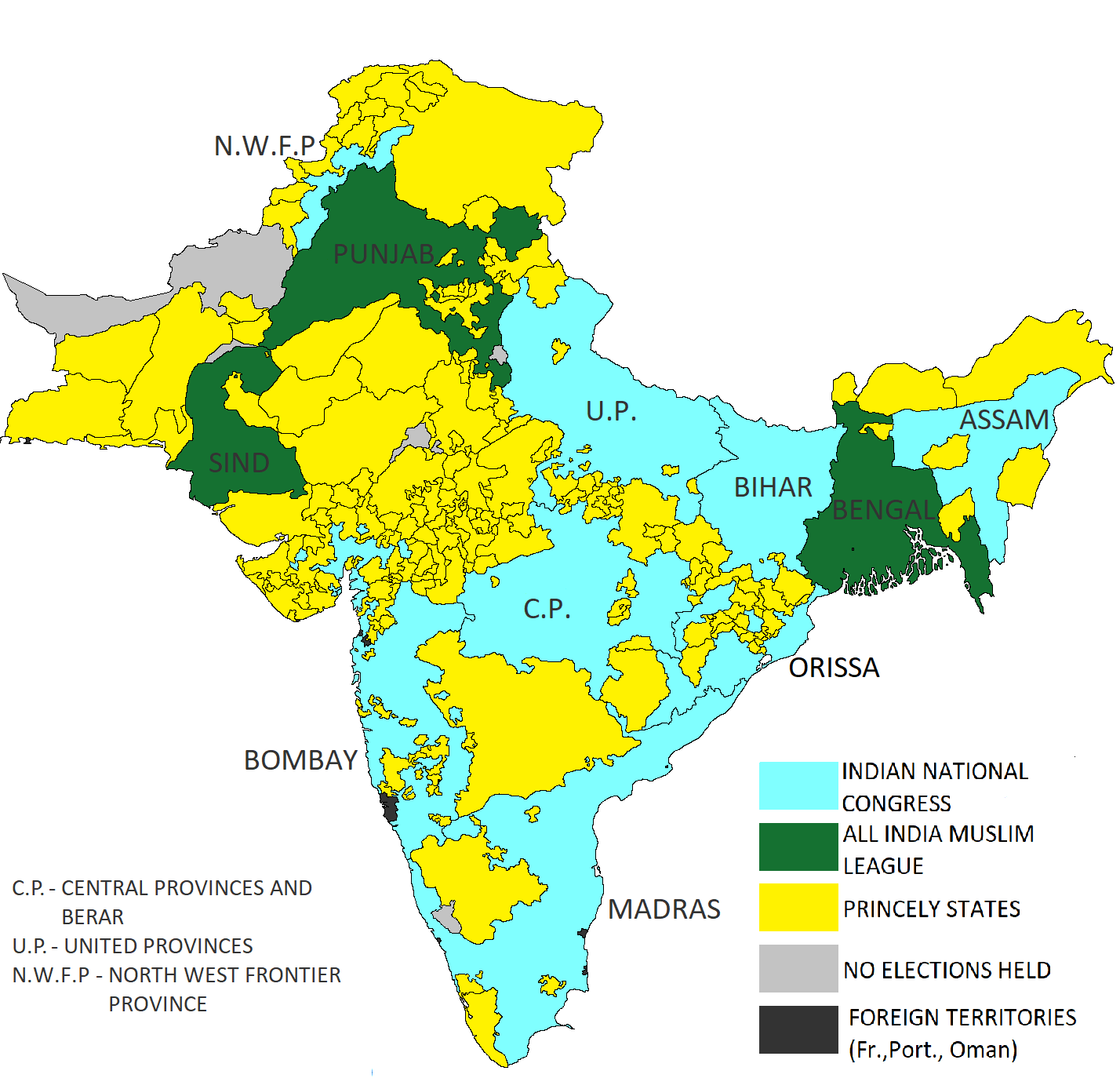

Provincial elections were held in British India in January 1946 to elect members of the legislative councils of the Indian provinces. The Congress, in a repeat of the 1937 elections, won 90% of the general non-Muslim seats, while the Muslim League won the 87% of the Muslim seats in the provinces. Voting in this election was restricted on property-owning qualifications. The franchise under Government of India Act 1935 was quite limited compared to universal suffrage and less than 10% of the population in provinces under direct British control were eligible to vote based on their property and income.

The All India Muslim League verified its claim to be the sole representative of Muslim population in British India, despite the majority of the Muslim population not being able to vote. The election laid the path to Pakistan.

These elections were followed by 1946 Indian Constituent Assembly election where Congress, under the leadership of Jawaharlal Nehru, secured major victory. Following this, the Interim Government of India, headed by Nehru, was formed in September 1946.

== Background ==
On 19 September 1945, following negotiations between Indian leaders and members of the 1946 Cabinet Mission to India from the United Kingdom, the Viceroy Lord Wavell announced that elections to the provincial and central legislatures would be held from December 1945 to January 1946. It was also announced that an executive council would be formed and a constitution-making body would be convened after these elections. These elections were important, as the provincial assemblies thus formed were to then elect a new Constituent Assembly, which would begin formulating a Constitution for an independent India. All contesting parties began campaigning. The Indian National Congress represented almost the entire Hindu population, while the Muslim League professed to speak for the whole Muslim population. The dominant issue of the election campaign became the issue of Pakistan.

Originally, the Muslim League had been a party that received most of its support from the Muslim-minority provinces, where manufactured fear of Hindu 'domination' was greater, as was a sort of a sense of 'loss of privilege', and to showcase its argument for Muslim nationhood, the League needed support from both Muslim-majority as well as Muslim-minority provinces. In the election campaign, the League resorted to establishing networks with traditional power bases, such as landowners and the religious elite, in the Muslim-majority provinces to win support. Religious slogans were utilized, and the term 'Pakistan' was put forward. Some scholars state that the meaning of Pakistan was kept vague so that it meant different things to different people. Notwithstanding the ambiguities, Venkat Dhulipala argues that the proposals for Pakistan were vigorously debated in public, maps were printed, economic foundations were analysed, and Pakistan was envisioned as an Islamic state. The Muslim League's support for the United Kingdom's war efforts during World War II had nurtured the possibility of establishing a Muslim nation.

In contrast to earlier elections, the religious commitment was intertwined with a declaration of Muslim communal unity. Casting the vote became an Islamic act. Consequently, for the Muslim electorate, Pakistan represented both a nation-state for India's Muslims, but one that surpassed the common state structure, and an awakening of an Islamic polity where Islam would be blended with the state's functioning. However, only 13% of the Muslims were allowed to vote in this election, and "even educated Muslims did not know what Pakistan meant or implied".

The voting in this election was restricted on property-owning qualifications.

== Results ==
Of the total of 1585 seats, the Indian National Congress won 923 (58.23%), and the All-India Muslim League won 429 seats out of 492 Muslim reserved seats (26.81% of the total), placing it as the second-ranking party. It captured all Muslim constituencies in the central assembly as well as most of the Muslim constituencies in the provincial legislatures. The vote opened the path to Pakistan. The system of separate electorates ensured that Muslim contestants would compete with other Muslim candidates instead of facing non-Muslim contestants. Thus, the establishment of Pakistan was debated mainly among Muslims themselves.

The Muslim League's biggest success was in Bengal, where out of 119 seats for Muslims, it won 113. The League reinforced its vote in the Muslim minority provinces. It won 54 out of 64 Muslim seats in the United Provinces and 34 of Bihar's 40 Muslim seats. It captured all Muslim seats in Bombay and Madras. The party demonstrated that it was the representative of Muslim India.

The Communist Party of India had presented 108 candidates, out of whom only 8 won a seat. The setback came as a result of the decision of the party not to support the Quit India movement of 1942. Seven out of the eight seats it won were reserved for labour representatives. All in all, the Communist Party obtained 2.5% of the popular vote. Albeit far from competing with the two main parties, the communists became the third force in terms of the popular vote. Among the communist candidates elected were Jyoti Basu (railways constituency in Bengal), Ratanlal Brahmin (Darjeeling), and Rupnarayan Roy (Dinajpur).

The results for the North-West Frontier Province came through in March. Congress achieved a strong majority, largely due to the personality of Abdul Ghaffar Khan, enabling them to form a government without trouble.

In Punjab, the concerted effort of the Muslim League led to its greatest success, winning 75 seats of the total Muslim seats and becoming the largest single party in the Assembly. The Unionist Party suffered heavy losses, winning only 20 seats in total. The Congress was the second-largest party, winning 43 seats, whilst the Sikh-centric Akali Dal came third with 22 seats. The INC, Akalis, and Khizar Hayat Khan's Unionist Party kept the League out of government by forming the Punjab Coalition Party. This was controversial both among supporters of the INC, who previously had decried Khizar Khan as a reactionary, and with Jinnah, who denounced the 'Khizar-led Quisling ministry' as 'an insult to the determined will of the Mussulmans and a blot on the fair name of [the Punjab]'.

In Assam, Congress won all the general seats, and most of those were reserved for special interests, thus forming the local government. The Muslim League won all the Muslim seats.

In the Muslim-majority province of Sind, the Muslim League won the most seats. Congress, however, also achieved strong results and initially hoped to form a coalition in government with four Muslims who had defected from the Muslim League. At the last minute, one of the four Muslim dissidents went over to the Muslim League, handing them a majority of one. Congress then lobbied three European members, who would swing the balance of power into their favour, but their overtures were rejected. The Governor of Sind, therefore, asked the Muslim League to form the local government.

=== Legislative assemblies ===
Province	Congress	Muslim League	Other parties	Independents	Total
Assam	58	31	Europeans 9 Others 3	7	108
Bengal	86	113	Europeans 25; Others 12	14	250
Bihar	98	34	8	12	152
Bombay	125	30	2	18	175
Central Provinces	92	13		7	112
Madras	163	28	Communist Party of India 2	22	215
North West Frontier Province	30	17	2	1	50
Orissa	47	4		9	60
Punjab	51	73	Akalis 22; Unionist Party 20; Majlis-e Ahrar-e Islam 2	7	175
Sind	18	28	10	4	60
United Provinces	153	54	7	14	228
Total	923	425	123	114	1585

=== Overall Muslim League performance ===
According to Robert Stern, religious fervour played a part in the League's victory. In Punjab also, religious appeal was the factor in the battle between the league and the Muslim members of the Unionist party who were not interested in Pakistan.

Province	Muslim Seats	Muslim League	Win %
Assam	34	31	91%
Bengal	119	113	95%
Bihar	40	34	85%
Bombay	30	30	100%
Central Provinces	14	13	93%
Madras	29	29	100%
NWFP	36	17	47%
Orissa	4	4	100%
Punjab	86	74	86%
Sind	34	28	82%
United Provinces	66	54	82%
Total	492	429	87%

Compared to the above table, Indian Annual Register, 1946, vol. I shows a different scenario. There are some differences between the results of the two sources.

Province	Congress	Muslim League	Others	Total seats
Assam	58	31	19	108
Bengal	86	113	51	250
Bihar	98	34	20	152
Bombay	125	30	20	175
C.P.	92	13	71	112
Madras	165	29	21	215
N.W.F.P	30	17	3	50
Orissa	47	4	9	60
Punjab	51	73	51	175
Sind	18	27	15	60
U.P.	154	54	21	228
Source: N. N. Mitra (ed.), Indian Annual Register, 1946, vol. I, pp. 230–231. Chatterji, J. (2002). Bengal divided: Hindu communalism and partition, 1932-1947 (No. 57). Cambridge University Press.

== Aftermath ==
=== 1946 Indian Constituent Assembly election ===
These elections were followed by 1946 Indian Constituent Assembly election where Congress, under the leadership of Jawaharlal Nehru, secured major victory.

The Congress formed its ministries in Assam, Bihar, Bombay, Central Provinces, Madras, NWFP, Orissa, and United Provinces. The Muslim League formed its ministries in Bengal and Sind. A coalition government consisting of the Congress, Unionist Party, and the Akalis was formed in Punjab Province. Members of the Constituent Assembly of India were selected through an indirect election by the elected legislators in the 1946 Indian Constituent Assembly election, conducted under the British government's Cabinet Mission plan.

The Interim Government of India was formed after these elections.

=== Punjab Province ===
A well-documented account of how the coalition government − under popular Punjabi Muslim, Hindu, and Sikh leaders such as Khizar Hayat Tiwana, Chhotu Ram, and Tara Singh − led by the secular Unionist Party in Punjab Province collapsed as a result of a massive campaign launched by the then Punjab Muslim League has been given by Sharma, Madhulika. AIML (Punjab) deemed the coalition government 'non-representative' and thought it was their right to bring such a government down (notwithstanding the fact that it was a legal and democratically elected government). AIML (P) called for a 'Civil Disobedience' movement − fully backed by Mr. Jinnah and Mr. Liaquat Ali Khan, after they had failed to enlist Sikh support to help form an AIML-led government in Punjab. This led to bloody communal riots in Punjab during the later part of 1946.

By early 1947, the law and order situation in the province came to such a point where civil life was utterly paralyzed. It was under such circumstances that the Premier of Punjab (Chief minister), Khizar Hayat Tiwana of the coalition-led Unionist Party, was forced to resign on 2 March 1947. His cabinet was dissolved the same day. As there was no hope left for any other government to be formed to take the place of the Khizer government, the then Punjab Governor Sir Evan Jenkins imposed Governor's rule in Punjab on 5 March, which continued up to the partition day, that is, 15 August 1947.

Akali-Dall Sikhs, with 22 seats, were major stakeholders in the coalition along with Congress (51) and the Unionist Party (20), who were infuriated over the dissolution of the Khizer Government. It was in this backdrop that on 3 March 1947, Akali Sikh leader Master Tara Singh brandished his kirpan outside the Punjab Assembly, saying openly, "down with Pakistan and blood be to the one who demands it". From this day onwards, Punjab was engulfed in such bloody communal riots that history had never witnessed before. Eventually, Punjab had to be partitioned into the Indian and Pakistani Punjab. In the process, a huge number of people were massacred, millions were forced to cross over and become refugees, and thousands of women were abducted, raped, and killed across all religious communities in Punjab.
