= Kotli Loharan =

Town in Punjab, Pakistan

Kotli Loharan کوٹلی لوہاراں
- Town
- Location within Pakistan
- Coordinates: 32.35°N 74.29°E
- Country: Pakistan
- Province: Punjab
- District: Sialkot

Population (2023)
  - Total: 43,000
- Time zone: UTC+5 (PST)
- Number of Union councils: 3
- Website: Government Website

Kotli Loharan (Urdu, Punjabi: کوٹلی لوہاراں) is a town and Municipality in Sialkot District of Punjab, Pakistan. It is an industrial town in the middle of agricultural tracts below the lower Himalayas..

The people of the town were swordsmiths, and it is said that this village was a kind of a land grant, in recognition of their services. Now the swords are no longer important but surgical instruments still are there. Many kinds of articles for use and ornaments are still made, such as shields and arms, betel-nut cutters, knives, boxes, plates, inkstands, and so on. The material used is iron, and gold and silver are used in inlaying. K. L Industry used to manufacture mine-laying machines, hydraulic jacks and instruments for F-86 aircraft engine maintenance for the Pakistan Army.

In recent years a veterinary hospital, boys and girls colleges, schools and roads have been constructed. Bazars were widened in 2010, fresh water filtration plants were also installed in various locations, streets were cemented, the rural hospital's new building was constructed and upgraded, and ring roads were made.

People from the town are living in Commonwealth countries, the Middle East and the UK. Majority of the original population of this town have moved to the big cities of Pakistan and overseas, especially in Kenya and UK. The current population is a mix of new migrants from Jammu and Kashmir (from the Indo-Pakistani war of 1947–1948) and the old population.

During the 2025 India–Pakistan conflict, Mehmona Joya a village near the town was targeted in Indian air strikes, claiming to hit a terrorist camp of Hizbul Mujahideen. Pakistan claimed that two missiles struck the village: one misfired and the other landed in an open field, causing no damage.

== History ==
Supposedly, the town was built or just upgraded, by the British somewhere in the mid-19th century as a weapons and artillery manufacturing town; the principle bladed weapon maker being J D Pensioner & Sons whose name and location in Kotli Loharan E often appears on Nepalese Gurkha kukri and swords.

Most of the original families and residents of the town have moved away to bigger cities in Pakistan, the United States, and the United Kingdom.

== Geography and climate ==
Lying between 32°35′ North latitude and 74°29′ East longitude at an altitude of 256 m above sea level, the Chenab River flows on the northern side of Kotli Loharan just 10 kilometers from the town. Koti Loharan is cold during winters and hot and humid during summers. May and June are the hottest months. The temperature during winter may drop to 0 °C. The land is, generally, plain and fertile. Most of the rain falls during the monsoon season in summer. Now the climatic changes have occurred. The summer is getting much hotter than before. The raining has also decreased significantly in recent years.

=== Sectors ===
The mohallas of Kotli Loharan East are:

1. Hakima
2. Rara
3. Kashmiri
4. Khui
5. Bullowal
6. Ghallian
7. Matarani
8. Darash
9. Chungi
10. Chouharwali

== Government facilities ==
In Kotli Loharan East these government facilities exist:

1. Pakistan Post Office
2. Water and Power Development Authority Office
3. Pakistan Telecommunication Company Limited
4. Government Hospital
5. Government High School For Boys
6. Government High School For Girls
7. National Database and Registration Authority Office
8. Passport Office
9. Girls College
10. Police Station

== Transport ==
Transport methods in the town include:

- Public buses
- Shared taxis and minibuses
- Rickshaws

Local bus services for Kotli Loharan operate from Sialkot's main bus station towards Marala. Kotli Loharan is in the middle of this bus route.

=== Airport ===
Sialkot International Airport is just 10-15 kilometres from Kotli Loharan East. There is also a small Sialkot Cantonment Airport in Sialkot Cantonment in use by the aviation wing of the Pakistan Army.

== Education ==
There are public as well as private schools situated at Kotli Loharan. There are two Govt. Middle Schools separate for boys and girls, Govt. Intermediate College for Girls and Govt. High School for Boys. In addition there are many Montessori and English medium schools and two private girls colleges.

=== Govt. Higher Secondary School for Boys ===
It is one of the oldest high schools of Sialkot District and serves almost 24 villages and towns surrounding of Kolti Loharan.

== Healthcare ==
Govt Hospital There was a Rural Health Center (RHC) level hospital situated between Kotli Loharan East and West for easy approach. Since 2015 it has been upgraded to tehsil headquarters hospital with new building and more facilities accordingly.

Private Hospital Zahid Hospital has a wide range of specialist doctors.

Clinic Many private clinics and medical store are also provide public service.

== See also ==
- Kharota Syedan
