= Khurshed Lal =

Indian politician

Khursed Lal

Member of the Constituent Assembly of India

Personal details
- Born: 4 March 1903 Kotli Laharan, Sialkot, Pakistan
- Died: 18 February 1951
- Citizenship: Indian
- Party: Indian National Congress
- Education: LLB
- Alma mater: University of Lucknow

Khurshed Lal was an Indian politician. He was the member of Constituent Assembly of India from United Provinces through the Indian National Congress ticket.

== Early life and education ==
Lal was born on 4 March 1903 in the small town of Kotli Laharan in Sialkot district of present-day Pakistan. After completing his master's and LLB degree from Lucknow University, in 1926 he enrolled in the Allahabad High Court as an advocate.

== Role in India’s Independence Movement ==
Five years after beginning his law practice, Lal joined the Congress and would remain a lifelong member of the party. By 1936 he became quite involved in local governance and served as the Chairman of the Dehra Dun Municipality for the next four years.

== Contribution to Constitution Making ==
Lal was elected to the Constituent Assembly from the United Provinces on a Congress party ticket. He was not particularly active in the Assembly but was part of its Select Committee that had the task of evaluating the Hindu Code Bill and reporting to the Assembly on it. After Independence, Lal joined the first cabinet of independent India in 1950 as the Deputy Minister for Communications (State).
