= V. C. Vellingiri Gounder =

Indian politician (1880–1948)

- Born: 28 October 1880; Vellakkinar, Madras Presidency, British India
- Died: 7 November 1948 (aged 68)
- Children: 3

Vellakkinar Chinnappa Vellingiri Gounder (28 October 1880 – 7 November 1948) was an Indian agriculturist, industrialist, and politician from Tamil Nadu.

== Early life ==
Vellingiri Gounder was born on 28 October 1880 in Vellakkinar, Madras Presidency, British India, to V. K. Chinnappa Gounder and Parvathi Ammal. He attended Hindu College in Coimbatore. In 1898, he married Nanjammal of Narasipuram, and the couple had three children—two daughters and a son.

== Political career ==
He was an active participant in the anti-liquor campaign of 1922, advocating temperance in Tamil Nadu. He served as a member of the Madras Legislative Council for two terms in 1920 and 1923.

In 1932, he was elected to the Council of State (an upper house of the legislature during British rule). He later became the President of the Coimbatore District Board in January 1933, a position he held for approximately nine years. He was re-elected to the Council of State in 1945, representing the Central District (Salem, Coimbatore & North Arcot) of the Madras Presidency.

In 1936, Gounder founded the Gnanambika Mills in his village. He was also a founding member of the Gounder caste association. He was closely associated with the Ramakrishna Mission, supporting its educational initiatives.

== Death ==
Vellingiri Gounder died on 7 November 1948.
