= Balkrishna Sharma (CPI politician) =

Indian politician

Balkrishna Sharma was an Indian politician. He was a leader of the Communist Party of India and the Kisan Sabha. Sharma was active in organising peasants movement in northern Madhya Pradesh for various decades. Together with other CPI leaders such as Khan Shakir Ali Khan he organised occupations of estates of ex-princes and other large landowners. As of 1973 he was a member of the Central Kisan Committee, the national leadership of the All India Kisan Sabha.

Sharma contested the Gird seat in the 1962 Madhya Pradesh Legislative Assembly election. He finished in third place, with 5,305 votes (18.22%).

Ten years later, Sharma won the Gird seat in a June 1972 by-election. The Indian National Congress had declared its support for Sharma's candidature, but local Congress leaders in Gwalior offered little support for him. He got 12,704 votes compared to 11,915 votes for the Bharatiya Jana Sangh candidate Maheshdutta Mishra.

Sharma lost the Gird seat in the 1977 Madhya Pradesh Legislative Assembly election. He finished in fourth place with 2,348 votes (6.04% of the votes in the constituency).
