= Sheikh Karamat Ali =

Pakistani politician

Sheikh Karamat Ali (died 8 September 1951) was a Pakistani Muslim League politician from Punjab, Pakistan.

Ali was a lawyer, by training. In the 1946 Punjab Provincial Assembly election, he stood as a Muslim League candidate from the North-Eastern Towns constituency, reserved for Muslims. (Note: There existed an eponymous constituency but reserved for Generals which was won by Kishan Gopal Dutt of Congress, unopposed.) Ali defeated the incumbent legislator —Maulvi Mazhar Ali Azhar, General Secretary of the Majlis-e-Ahrar-ul-Islam— comfortably, by a margin of about six thousand votes. In the Assembly, Ali opposed the Congress-Unionist coalition government, and was particularly noted for his animosity towards Hindus. Subsequently, he was elected (Note: The Cabinet Mission Plan had reserved one seat in the Constitution Assembly per million people of a province. These seats were distributed among Muslims, Sikhs, and General (Hindus and others) category in proportion to their share of population in the province and were to be elected by legislators of the particular community. Punjab Province was allotted with twenty eight seats, of which eight were reserved for General category, sixteen for Muslims, and rest for Sikhs.) by the Assembly to the Constituent Assembly of India but abdicated attendance until the Mountbatten Plan sanctioned the creation of Pakistan and its own constituent assembly.

He continued (Note: All members of the '46 legislature, who won from what was now Pakistan's share of Punjab, were appointed to the assembly as immediate re-elections were not feasible.) to be a member of the inaugural Provincial Assembly of West Punjab and held the Ministries of Education, Public Works, Health, and Local Governance. C. October 1948, Prime Minister Liaquat Ali Khan requested of Iftikhar Hussain Khan Mamdot —then Chief Minister of Pakistan— to dismiss Ali, on allegations of corruption but Mamdot, facing intense factionalism, did not agree. (Note: Eventually Mamdot had to resign but nobody was able to form a government, leading to the promulgation of Governor's rule in January, 1949.) Ali died on 8 September 1951, suffering from protracted illness.
