= 1946 Cabinet Mission to India =

Talks on a British transfer of power to India and Pakistan

On 24 March 1946, a mission of three British Cabinet members went to British India to discuss the transfer of power from the British government to the Indian political leadership with the aim of preserving India's unity and granting its independence. Formed at the initiative of Prime Minister Clement Attlee, the mission consisted of three Cabinet ministers: Lord Pethick-Lawrence (Secretary of State for India), Sir Stafford Cripps (President of the Board of Trade), and A. V. Alexander (First Lord of the Admiralty). The Viceroy of India, Lord Wavell, participated in some of the discussions.

The Cabinet Mission Plan, formulated by the group, proposed a three-tier administrative structure for British India, with the Federal Union at the top tier, individual provinces at the bottom tier, and groups of provinces as a middle tier. Three groups were proposed, called Groups A, B, and C, respectively, for Northwest India, eastern India, and the remaining central portions of India.

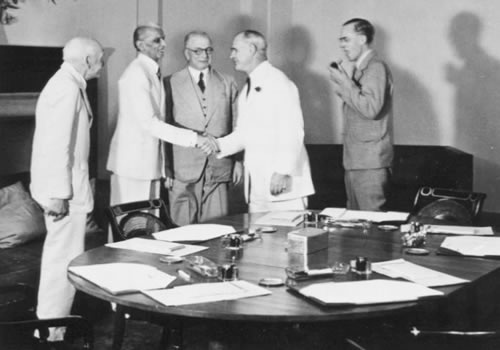
British government photograph of the Cabinet mission to India meeting Muhammad Ali Jinnah in 1946. On the extreme left is Lord Pethick-Lawrence; on the extreme right, Sir Strafford Cripps.

The Cabinet Mission's plan failed because of the distrust between the Indian National Congress and the Muslim League, and the British government replaced Lord Wavell with a new viceroy, Lord Mountbatten, to find new solutions.

== Background ==
Towards the end of their rule, the British found that their temporary patronage of the Muslim League conflicted with their longstanding need for Indian unity. The desire for a united India was an outcome of both their pride in having politically unified the subcontinent and the doubts of most British authorities as to the feasibility of Pakistan. The desire for Indian unity was symbolised by the Cabinet Mission, which arrived in New Delhi on 24 March 1946, which was sent by the British government, in which the subject was the formation of a post-independent India. The three men who constituted the mission, A. V. Alexander, Stafford Cripps, and Pethick-Lawrence, favoured India's unity for strategic reasons. The three members of the cabinet were nicknamed "the Magi" by Wavell.

Upon arriving in the subcontinent, the mission found both parties, the Indian National Congress and the Muslim League, more unwilling than ever to reach a settlement. The two parties had performed well in the elections, general and provincial, and emerged as the two main parties in the subcontinent, the provincial organizations having been defeated because of the separate electorates system. The Muslim League had been victorious in approximately 90 percent of the seats for Muslims. After having achieved victory in the elections, Jinnah gained a strong hand to bargain with the British and with Congress. Having established the system of separate electorates, the British had to accept its consequences even though a divided India was not in their interests.

== Plan ==
The mission made its own proposals, after inconclusive dialogue with the Indian leadership, and saw that the Congress opposed Jinnah's demand for a Pakistan comprising six full provinces. The mission proposed a complicated system for India with three tiers: the provinces, provincial groupings, and the centre. The centre's power was to be confined to foreign affairs, defence, currency, and communications. The provinces would keep all other powers and could establish three groups. The plan's main characteristic was the grouping of provinces. Two groups would be constituted by the mainly-Muslim western and eastern provinces. The Cabinet Mission Plan, announced on 16 May 1946, proposed:

- A united Union of India, including British India and the princely states.
- A weak central government responsible only for defence, foreign affairs, communications, and related finances.
- Provincial governments retaining all other powers.
- Provinces divided into three groups:
  - Group A: Hindu-majority provinces such as Madras, Bombay, Bihar and the United Provinces.
  - Group B: Muslim-majority provinces such as Punjab, Sindh, the North-West Frontier Province and Balochistan.
  - Group C: Bengal and Assam.
- A Constituent Assembly to frame India’s constitution.
- An interim government until the new constitution was completed.

The third group would comprise the mostly-Hindu areas in the south and the centre. Thus, provinces such as United Provinces, Central Provinces and Berar, Bombay, Bihar, Orissa, and Madras would make Group A. Group B would comprise Sind, Punjab, Northwest Frontier, and Balochistan. Bengal and Assam would make a Group C. Princely States will retain all subjects and powers other than those ceded to the Union.

== Reactions ==
Through the scheme, the British expected to maintain Indian unity, as both they and Congress wanted, and also to provide Jinnah the substance of Pakistan. The proposals almost satisfied Jinnah's insistence on a large Pakistan, which would avert the North-Eastern Pakistan without the mostly non-Muslim districts in Bengal and Punjab being partitioned away. By holding the full provinces of Punjab and Bengal, Jinnah could satisfy the provincial leaders who feared losing power if their provinces were divided. The presence of large Hindu minorities in Punjab and Bengal also provided a safeguard for the Muslim minorities remaining in the mostly-Hindu provinces.

Jinnah explained in a letter to Karachi mayor Hatim Alavi on 10 June 1946 that the acceptance of the Cabinet Mission Plan was only a first step. Once Group B and Group C were established in the northwest and northeast, nothing would stop them from seceding later. "We can work on the two decks, provincial and group," he urged, "and blow up the topmast" at any time.

Most of all, Jinnah wanted parity between Pakistan and India. He believed that provincial groupings could best secure that. He claimed that Muslim India was a 'nation' with entitlement to central representations equal to those of Hindu India. Despite his preference for only two groups, the Muslim League's Council accepted the mission's proposals on 6 June 1946 after it had secured a guarantee from Wavell that the League would be placed in the interim government if the Congress did not accept the proposal.

Congress also accepted the proposals and understood them to be a repudiation of the demand for Pakistan, and its position was that, in case a group constitution was framed by its Constituent Assembly, the provinces should have one vote each. Therefore, in Group B, Muslim-majority Bengal and Hindu-majority Assam would have one vote each. However, the Muslim League interpreted the plan to mean that the state's influence in the Group Constituent Assembly would be proportional to its population. Another point of difference concerned the Congress position that a sovereign constituent assembly would not be bound to the plan. Jinnah insisted that it was binding once the plan was accepted. The groupings plan maintained India's unity, but the organisation's leadership, most of all Nehru, increasingly believed that the scheme would leave the centre without the strength to achieve the party's ambitions. Congress's socialist section, led by Nehru, desired a government able to industrialise the country and to eliminate poverty.

Also, Nehru and Gandhi insisted that the Congress-dominated North-West Frontier Province be excluded from any Pakistan region within the federation, a stance that Jinnah didn't like.

Nehru's speech on 10 July 1946 rejected the idea that the provinces would be obliged to join a group and stated that the Congress was neither bound nor committed to the plan. In effect, Nehru's speech squashed the mission's plan and the chance to keep India united. Jinnah interpreted the speech as another instance of treachery by the Congress. With Nehru's speech on groupings, the Muslim League rescinded its previous approval of the plan on 29 July.

== Interim government and breakdown ==
Concerned by the diminishing British power, Wavell was eager to inaugurate an interim government. Disregarding Jinnah's vote, he authorised a cabinet in which Nehru was the interim prime minister. Sidelined and with his Pakistan of "groups" refused, Jinnah became distraught. To achieve Pakistan and impose on Congress that he could not be sidelined, he resorted to calling for his supporters to use "direct action" to demonstrate their support for Pakistan in the same manner as Gandhi's civil disobedience campaigns, but it led to rioting and massacres on religious grounds in some areas. Direct Action Day further increased Wavell's resolve to establish the interim government. On 2 September 1946, Nehru's cabinet was installed.

Millions of Indian Muslim households flew black flags to protest the installation of the Congress government. Jinnah did not himself join the interim government but sent Liaquat Ali Khan into it to play a secondary role. Congress did not want to give him the important position of home minister and instead allowed him the post of finance minister. Liaquat Ali Khan infuriated Congress by using his role to prevent the functioning of Congress ministries. He demonstrated, under Jinnah's instructions, the impossibility of a single government for India.

Britain tried to revive the Cabinet Mission's scheme by sending Nehru, Jinnah, and Wavell in December to meet Attlee, Cripps, and Pethick-Lawrence. The inflexible arguments were enough to cause Nehru to return to India and announce that "we have now altogether stopped looking towards London". Meanwhile, Wavell commenced the Constituent Assembly, which the League boycotted. He anticipated that the League would enter it as it had joined the interim government. Instead, the Congress became more forceful and asked him to drop ministers from the Muslim League. Wavell also could not obtain a declaration from the British government that would articulate its goals.

On 15 December 1946, Mahatma Gandhi met the Assam Congress leaders and told them to refuse to join Group C in the Constituent Assembly. He continued, "If you do not act correctly and now, Assam will be finished. Tell Mr Bardoloi I do not feel the least uneasiness. My mind is made up. Assam must not lose its soul. It must uphold it against the whole world... It is an impertinent suggestion that Bengal should dominate Assam in any way." Thus, he rejected the grouping scheme in the Cabinet Mission Plan to prevent the Muslim League from controlling Hindu-majority Assam. Gandhi feared that the League would use its power in a confederal arrangement to continue large-scale Muslim infiltration into Assam and make it a Muslim-majority province.

In the context of the worsening situation, Wavell drew up a breakdown plan that provided for a gradual British exit, but his plan was considered fatalistic by the Cabinet. When he insisted on his plan, he was replaced with Lord Mountbatten.

== See also ==
- Opposition to the partition of India
- Indo-Pakistani Confederation
- Cripps Mission

== Bibliography ==
- Peter Hardy (1972). The Muslims of British India. Cambridge University Press. ISBN 0-521-08488-1.
- Hermann Kulke; Dietmar Rothermund (2004) [First published 1986]. A History of India (PDF) (4th ed.). Routledge. ISBN 0-415-32919-1. Archived from the original (PDF) on 26 February 2015.
- Barbara D. Metcalf; Thomas R. Metcalf (2006) [First published 2001]. A Concise History of Modern India (PDF) (2nd ed.). Cambridge University Press. ISBN 978-0-521-86362-9.
- Ian Talbot; Gurharpal Singh (2009). The Partition of India. Cambridge University Press. ISBN 978-0-521-85661-4.
- Stanley Wolpert (2009) [First published 1977]. A New History of India (8th ed.). Oxford University Press. ISBN 978-0-19-516677-4.
