= Omar Hayat Malik =

Pakistani Diplomat

1st Ambassador to Japan
- Incumbent
- Assumed office 1950

Vice Chancellor University of the Punjab

Principal Islamia College Peshawar

Personal details
- Born: ,
- Education: Government College, Lahore

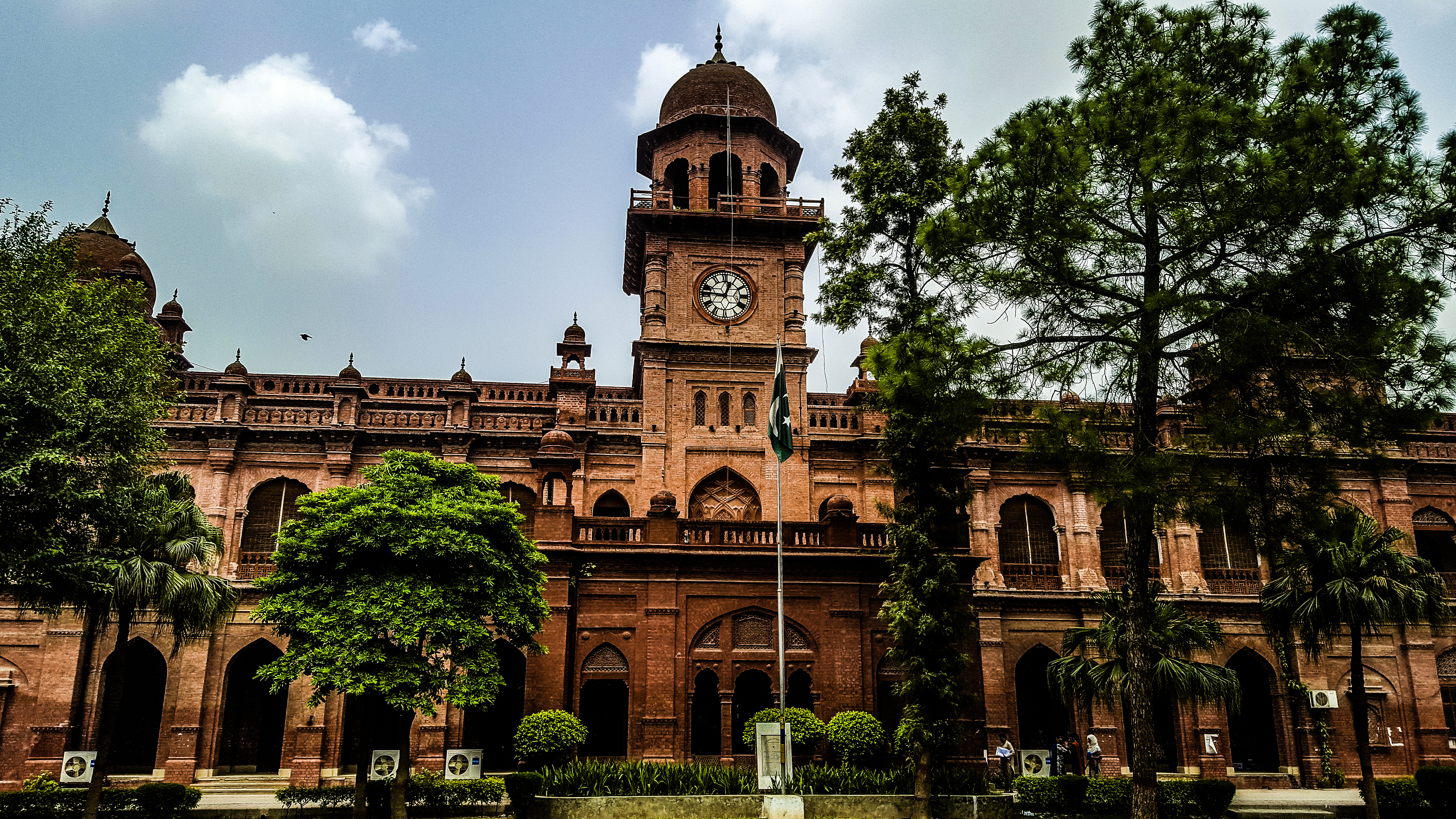
Punjab University, Lahore.

Omar Hayat Malik was a Pakistani politician, educationist and diplomat, who served the first Vice Chancellor of the University of the Panjab after the independence of Pakistan. Later he joined as Ambassador to Japan.

In British India, Malik served as the principal of the Islamia College, Peshawar and Islamia College, Lahore. A participant in the Pakistan Movement, he was elected (Note: The Cabinet Mission Plan had reserved one seat in the Constitution Assembly per million people of a province. These seats were distributed among Muslims, Sikhs, and General (Hindus and others) category in proportion to their share of population in the province and were to be elected by legislators of the particular community. Punjab Province was allotted with twenty eight seats, of which eight were reserved for General category, sixteen for Muslims, and rest for Sikhs.) to the Constituent Assembly of India as a candidate of Muslim League and abdicated attendance until the Mountbatten Plan sanctioned the creation of Pakistan and its own constituent assembly. A gifted orator, Malik wished for the new state to be a theocratic democracy.

In independent Pakistan, Malik was appointed as the first vice-chancellor of the University of the Punjab. However, he resigned in 1950 and joined the diplomatic corps; Malik would serve as Pakistan's ambassador to Japan, Germany, Indonesia and as High Commissioner to India.
