= M. C. Veerabahu Pillai =

Indian politician (1903–1976)

Member of Constituent Assembly
- In office 1950–1952
- Prime Minister: Pandit Jawaharlal Nehru
- Preceded by: None
- Succeeded by: None

Personal details
- Born: 19 May 1903 Thoothukudi
- Died: 15 April 1976 (aged 72)}
- Party: Indian National Congress
- Education: Madras Law College
- Profession: Politician

M. Chidambaram Veerabahu Pillai (19 May 1903 – 15 April 1976) was an Indian lawyer, businessman, and politician from Tamil Nadu, who served in the first Lok Sabha of independent India; he was also an independence activist.

== Early life ==
M. C. Veerabahu was born to M. Chidambaram Pillai and Gomathi Ammal at Thoothukudi on 19 May 1903. His family was involved in Export Business to Colombo. Veerabahu was related to the prominent freedom fighter V. O. Chidambaram Pillai. At a very early age, Veerabahu was involved in Indian independence movement.

== Independence activism ==
Prior to Indian independence, Veerabahu sacrificed his law career to participate in Mahatma Gandhi's struggle. He was closely associated with stalwarts like Kamaraj and Rajaji. He actively worked for removal of untouchability, prohibition and championed the cause of Scheduled Castes.

== Political career ==
He was a member of the Constituent Assembly and the Provisional Parliament from 1946 to 1952. Veerabahu signed the original Constitution of India in his mother tongue, Tamil, being the only member of the Constituent Assembly to do so.

After independence, he served in the first Lok Sabha of independent India. Despite his contributions, he chose not to take a pension for freedom fighters, managing his family expenses through his ancestral property and income.

== Legacy ==
He died on 15 April 1976 at age 72.
