= Seth Sukhdev =

Pakistani politician

Seth Sukhdev Udhavdas (born 1896) was a Sindhi landlord and anti-colonial politician associated with the Indian National Congress. After partition, he chose to stay in Pakistan and allied with the Pakistan National Congress. In July 1949, Sukhdev was inducted as the non-Muslim representative of Sindh in the Constituent Assembly of Pakistan since Jairamdas Daulatram —the erstwhile representative in the Constituent Assembly of India on a Congress ticket (Note: The Cabinet Mission Plan had reserved one seat in the Constitution Assembly per million people of a province. These seats were distributed among Muslims, Sikhs, and General (Hindus and others) category in proportion to their share of population in the province and were to be elected by legislators of the particular community. Sindh Province was allotted with four seats, three of which were reserved for Muslims and the remainder for Generals (neither Muslim nor Sikhs).)— chose to stay in India.
