= Jafar Imam =

Indian politician

Member of Parliament, Rajya Sabha
- In office 1952-1956
- Constituency: Bihar

Personal details
- Born: 1903
- Party: Indian National Congress

Syed Jafar Imam was an Indian politician who served as a Member of Parliament, Rajya Sabha, representing Bihar, as a member of the Indian National Congress. He hailed from Neora, Bihar.
