= Interim Government of India =

1946–1947 provisional government

- Cabinet of British Raj

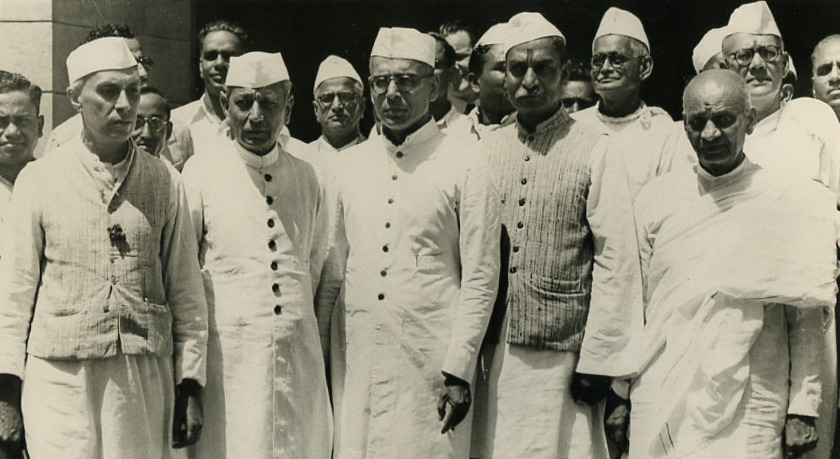
- Nehru with members of the Interim government faction leaving Viceroy's House after swearing in on 2 September 1946
- Date formed: 2 September 1946
- Date dissolved: 15 August 1947

People and organisations
- Emperor: George VI
- Viceroy and Governor-General: The Viscount Wavell (1946–47); Lord Mountbatten (1947)
- Head of Government: Jawaharlal Nehru (Note: as Vice President of Executive Council)
- No. of ministers: 15
- Member parties: Indian National Congress; All-India Muslim League
- Status in legislature: Coalition

History
- Election: 1946 Indian Constituent Assembly election
- Outgoing election: 1945 Indian general election
- Legislature term: Constituent Assembly of India
- Successor: First Nehru ministry (in Indian dominion); Khan ministry (in Pakistani dominion)

The Interim Government of India, also known as the Provisional Government of India, formed on 2 September 1946 from the newly elected Constituent Assembly of India, had the task of assisting the transition of British India to independence. It remained in place until 15 August 1947, the date of the independence (and partition) of British India, and the creation of the dominions of India and Pakistan.

== Formation ==
After the end of the Second World War, the British authorities in India released all political prisoners who had participated in the Quit India movement. The Indian National Congress, which had long fought for self rule, agreed to participate in elections for a constituent assembly, as did the Muslim League. The newly elected government of Clement Attlee dispatched the 1946 Cabinet Mission to India to formulate proposals for the formation of a government that would lead to an independent India.

The elections for the Constituent Assembly were not direct elections, as the members were elected from each of the provincial legislative assemblies. In the event, the Indian National Congress won a majority of the seats, some 69 per cent, including almost every seat in areas with a majority Hindu electorate. The Congress had clear majorities in eight of the eleven provinces of British India. The Muslim League won the seats allocated to the Muslim electorate.

== Viceroy's Executive Council ==
The Viceroy's Executive Council became the executive branch of the interim government. Originally headed by the Viceroy of India, it was transformed into a council of ministers, with the powers of a prime minister bestowed on the vice-president of the Council, a position held by the Congress leader Jawaharlal Nehru. All members would be Indians after independence, apart from the Viceroy — in August to become the Governor-General — Lord Mountbatten who would hold only a ceremonial position, and the Commander-in-Chief who after independence was General Sir Rob Lockhart.

The senior Congress leader Vallabhbhai Patel held the second-most powerful position in the Council, heading the Department of Home Affairs, Department of Information and Broadcasting. The Sikh leader Baldev Singh was responsible for the Department of Defence and Chakravarthi Rajagopalachari was named to head the Department of Education and arts. Asaf Ali, a Muslim Congress leader, headed the Department of Railways and Transport. Scheduled Caste leader Jagjivan Ram headed the Department of Labour, while Rajendra Prasad headed the Department of Food and Agriculture and John Matthai headed the Department of Industries and Supplies.

Upon the Muslim League joining the interim government, the second highest-ranking League politician, Liaquat Ali Khan, became the head of the Department of Finance. Abdur Rab Nishtar headed the Departments of Posts and Air and Ibrahim Ismail Chundrigar headed the Department of Commerce. The League nominated a Scheduled Caste Hindu politician, Jogendra Nath Mandal, to lead the Department of Law.

== Interim Government ==
As per the mid-June 1946 Cabinet Mission Plan, the Executive Council was expanded to consist of only Indian members except the Viceroy and the Commander-in-Chief intended to form the Interim Government of India until the transfer of power. The Viceroy, Viscount Wavell extended invitations for 14 members.

The Interim Government began to function from 2 September 1946 once the Indian National Congress members took their seats. However, the All-India Muslim League refused to participate until 26 October 1946. The Interim Government served until transfer of power to the Dominion of India and the Dominion of Pakistan on 15 August 1947.

=== Cabinet of the Interim Government of India ===
Portrait	Name	Term of office	
	Archibald Wavell, 1st Viscount Wavell Viceroy and Governor-General of India	2 September 1946	21 February 1947
	Louis Mountbatten Viceroy and Governor-General of India	21 February 1947	15 August 1947

=== Commander-in-Chief, India ===
No.	Portrait	Name	Term of office		Political party
1		General Sir Claude Auchinleck Commander-in-Chief, India	2 September 1946	15 August 1947	

=== Vice-President of the Executive Council ===
No.	Portrait	Name	Term of office		Political party
1		Jawaharlal Nehru Vice-President of the Executive Council; External Affairs & Commonwealth Relations	2 September 1946	15 August 1947	Indian National Congress

=== Minister of Home Affairs (India) ===
Portfolio
Home Affairs

Information & Broadcasting

No.	Portrait	Name	Term of office		Political party
1		Vallabhbhai Patel	2 September 1946	15 August 1947	Indian National Congress

=== Minister of Defence (India) ===
Portfolio
Defence

No.	Portrait	Name	Term of office		Political party
1		Baldev Singh	2 September 1946	15 August 1947	Indian National Congress

=== Ministry of Commerce ===
Portfolio
Ministry of Commerce and Industry

No.	Portrait	Name	Term of office		Political party
1		John Matthai	2 September 1946	15 August 1947	Indian National Congress

=== Minister of Education (India) ===
No.	Portrait	Name	Term of office		Political party
1		Chakravarthi Rajagopalachari	2 September 1946	15 August 1947	Indian National Congress

=== Ministry of Power (India) ===
No.	Portrait	Name	Term of office		Political party
1		Sarat Chandra Bose	2 September 1946	2 September 1946	Indian National Congress
2		Cooverji Hormusji Bhabha	2 September 1946	15 August 1947	Indian National Congress

Portfolio
Works, Mines and Power

=== Minister of Agriculture and Farmers' Welfare ===
No.	Portrait	Name	Term of office		Political party
1		Rajendra Prasad	2 September 1946	15 August 1947	Indian National Congress

Portfolio
Ministry of Food and Agriculture

=== Minister of Railways (India) ===
Portfolio
Railways and Transport

No.	Portrait	Name	Term of office		Political party
1		Asaf Ali	2 September 1946	15 August 1947	Indian National Congress

=== Ministry of Labour (India) ===
Portfolio
Labour

No.	Portrait	Name	Term of office		Political party
1		Jagjivan Ram	2 September 1946	15 August 1947	Indian National Congress

=== Minister of Finance (India) ===
Portfolio
Finance

No.	Portrait	Name	Term of office		Political party
1		Liaquat Ali Khan	2 September 1946	15 August 1947	All-India Muslim League

=== Ministry of Commerce and Industry (India) ===
Portfolio
Ministry of Commerce and Industry

No.	Portrait	Name	Term of office		Political party
1		Ibrahim Ismail Chundrigar	2 September 1946	15 August 1947	All-India Muslim League

=== Minister of Health (India) ===
No.	Portrait	Name	Term of office		Political party
1		Ghazanfar Ali Khan	2 September 1946	15 August 1947	All-India Muslim League

=== Ministry of communication (India) ===
No.	Portrait	Name	Term of office		Political party
1		Abdur Rab Nishtar	2 September 1946	15 August 1947	All-India Muslim League

=== Ministry of Law and Justice (India) ===
No.	Portrait	Name	Term of office		Political party
1		Jogendra Nath Mandal	2 September 1946	15 August 1947	All-India Muslim League

== Activities ==
Although until August 1947 British India remained under the sovereignty of the United Kingdom, the interim government proceeded to establish diplomatic relations with other countries, including the United States. Meanwhile, the Constituent Assembly, from which the Interim Government was drawn, began the task of drafting a constitution for independent India.

== See also ==
- Viceroy's Executive Council
- Council of State
- Government of British Raj
- Imperial Legislative Council
- Central Legislative Assembly
