= Jaspat Roy Kapoor =

Politician

Member of Parliament, Rajya Sabha
- In office 1952-1962
- Constituency: Uttar Pradesh

Personal details
- Born: 16 October 1896 Lahore
- Died: 22 April 1984 Agra
- Party: Indian National Congress
- Spouse: Parvati Kapoor
- Children: Lajpat Roy Kapoor Radha Rani Khanna Shyama Mehothra Sampat Roy Kapoor

Jaspat Roy Kapoor (16 October 1896 - 24 April 1984) was an Indian politician. He was a Member of Parliament, representing Uttar Pradesh in the Rajya Sabha the upper house of India's Parliament representing the Indian National Congress. He was also a member of the Constituent Assembly from 1946 to 1950.

He was a post graduate and he represented United Provinces in the provisional parliament representing the Indian National Congress. He was elected in 1950. Later, he served as a member of the Rajya Sabha from 1952 to 1962, during which he was also the chairman of the Committee on Petitions.

He died on 24 April 1984.
