= Srikrishna Dutt Paliwal =

Indian politician

Srikrishna Dutt Paliwal (1898 – 22 July 1968) was a politician from the Indian State of Uttar Pradesh.

He represented Uttar Pradesh in Rajya Sabha, the Council of States of India parliament during 1967 to 1968.

He was arrested in 1942 by the British government, along with other congressmen.
