= Guptanath Singh =

Indian politician

Member of Constituent Assembly of India
- In office 9 December 1946 – 24 January 1950

Guptanath Singh was an Indian politician. He was a member of the Constituent Assembly of India from Bihar.
