= Kharota Syedan =

- Town
- Country: Pakistan
- Province: Punjab
- District: Sialkot District

Area
  - Total: 2.52 km^{2} (0.97 sq mi)
  - Land: 1.487 km^{2} (0.574 sq mi)
  - Water: 0.0953 km^{2} (0.0368 sq mi) 3.78%
- Elevation: 246 m (807 ft)
- Post Office: 51240

Kharota Syedan is a village on the northern outskirts of Sialkot, Punjab, Pakistan. The town has community services such as primary, secondary and higher secondary education, private hospitals and clinics, a post office, mosques, churches and banks. The town has utilities including gas, electricity, water, and telephone communications.

Name

Kharota name is derived from Gharota which dreived from Ghar. It was common name for a village in ancient Jammu-Punjab region (There are at least 10 villages with Gharota name in the region, Most famous of them is where Dev Anand was born). Suffix "Syedan" was added recently to present majority of syed population in the village.

HISTORY

Jayram Pur is sub village situated in west of Kharota Syedan.

Kharota Syedan takes its name from the islamic honorific, Syed. Prior to the arrival of Islamic teachers in the 1100s AD,

the Lawful of the village lands was inherited by Raja Jay Ram Choudhry a descendant of Raja Sal Ban whose conquered Sialkot , a Hindu in the Lodhra family of the Jat clan which till date reside in Kharota. At that time, the village was called Jayrampur. And till date the lodhran family holds the highest land ownership as ancestral land and Lambardari of Kharota is with Lodhra family.

Now with advancement in structure from the government it holds all positions a town should hold. Chairman, Nazim and all administrative positions.

Over time Many other Clans have been living here happily. The Syed’s were the families which were offered lands to live and because of the current majority of Syed family in population the area is referred as Kharota Syedan although former name was Kharota Chaudrian.

Now the clans include the Choudhry family descendants Jatts , Gujjar, Arain, Rajput and the Pashtun people.

The principle Islamic teacher in the Jhelum region, now revered as a saint, was a man called Salah ad-Din from Hindustan. He converted the ruler of Jhelum,When Salah ad-Din and Khair Paswal arrived in Kharota Syedan, they lived at the site of the present village khanqah (place of religious gathering or spiritual retreat.) Salah ad-Din married Jay Ram Choudhry's daughter and took the village as dowry. Salah ad-Din's cousins came to live in the village.

The first khanqah in Kharota Syedan (Darbar Chitti Khangah) was founded by Fateh, son of Fazal, descendant of Khair Paswal. An annual festival to pay homage to Salah ad-Din takes place in May and June.

Refugees of the Indo-Pakistani War of 1971 settled in Kharota Syedan, contributing to the diversity of the population.

.

== Geography ==
Kharota Syedan lies on the outskirts of Sialkot township. It is about 250 km southwest of Islamabad, the capital of Pakistan. To the west is the Chenab river. To the east are the mountains of the Himalayas.
