= Amiyo Kumar Ghosh =

Indian politician

Member of Constituent Assembly of India
- In office 9 December 1946 – 24 January 1950

Amiyo Kumar Ghosh was an Indian politician. He was a member of the Constituent Assembly of India from Bihar. He was also a member of the Bihar Legislative Assembly.
