= Dharam Dass =

Indian politician

A. Dharam Dass

Member of Parliament, Rajya Sabha
- In office 1952-1960
- Constituency: Bihar

Member of Constituent Assembly of India
- In office 9 December 1946 – 24 January 1950

Personal details
- Born: 18 July 1877
- Died: 8 August 1960 (aged 83)
- Party: Indian National Congress
- Spouse: Kumari Thakur Das

A. Dharam Dass (1877-1960) was an Indian politician. He was a Member of Parliament, representing Bihar in the Rajya Sabha, the upper house of India's Parliament. He was also a member of the Constituent Assembly of India.
