= Mohanlal Saksena =

Indian author and politician

Mohanlal Saxena (1896–1965) was an Indian writer and politician from Uttar Pradesh. He started his public service with Lucknow Municipal Board under the guidance of his friend [Chaubey Mukta Prasad], a renowned civil engineer. He served as the Union Minister of Rehabilitation (1948–1950). He was a member of the United Provinces Legislative Council (1924–1926), Central Legislative Assembly (1935–1947), Constituent Assembly of India, Provisional Parliament (1950–1952) and the Barabanki (Lok Sabha constituency) (1952–1957). He was nominated as a member of Rajya Sabha from 1959 to 1964. Saxena was also the Secretary/ President of UP Congress Committee in 1929–1935 and 1937–1939.

== Sources ==
- Brief Biodata
