= Ishtiaq Hussain Qureshi =

Pakistani historian, scholar, and academic

- Born: 20 November 1903; Patyali, United Provinces, British India
- Died: 22 January 1981 (aged 77)
- Citizenship: Pakistan
- Known for: History of Pakistan
- Awards: Sitara-e-Pakistan (Star of Pakistan) Award; Hilal-i-Imtiaz (Crescent of Excellence) Award by the President of Pakistan

Academic background
- Education: Aligarh Muslim University; St. Stephen's College; Cambridge University
- Thesis: Administration of Sultanate of Delhi (1939)

Academic work
- Discipline: History
- Institutions: Delhi University; Punjab University; Columbia University; Karachi University; National Language Authority

Ishtiaq Hussain Qureshi (Urdu: اشتیاق حسين قریشی) (20 November 1903 – 22 January 1981) popularly known as I.H. Qureshi, SP, HI, was a Pakistani nationalist historian and playwright. He was the Vice Chancellor of the University of Karachi from 1961 till 1971.

An early activist of the historic Pakistan Movement, Qureshi served in the ministries of education and frontier regions as the secretary; in addition, he was elected a member of the parliament of Pakistan. But, due to his association with academia, he resigned from his government appointments and joined the academic faculty at the Columbia University as a professor of South Asian history. But soon, he returned to Pakistan and founded the National Language Authority (NLA) in the 1970s and helped set up the History Department at the University of the Punjab. Later, Qureshi joined the faculty of history at the University of Karachi where he remained the remainder of his life. Qureshi is also credited for editing a four-volume series on history of Pakistan.

== Biography ==
=== Early life and education ===
Qureshi was born on 20 November 1903 in a noble family of Patiyali, Kasganj District, a town near Allahabad in Uttar Pradesh, British India. He did matriculation in 1916. At this time, he took active part in Khilafat movement. He did graduation and M.A. in history from St. Stephen's College, Delhi, with distinction. In 1927, he got M.A. in Persian. He served as lecturer in history at St. Stephen's College from 1928 to 1944. Between 1937 and 1940, he studied at Cambridge University for a PhD degree. The topic of his thesis was Administration of Sultanate of Delhi. During this period, he also briefly joined the Pakistan Movement founded by Choudhary Rahmat Ali.

After returning from England, he joined Delhi University, where he was appointed professor of history, and subsequently, the dean of the Faculty of Arts. He also served as acting vice chancellor of the Delhi University. In 1947, during the Partition riots, when the Muslim students of the St Stephen's College had to be evacuated to the Purana Qila, Dr Qureshi's library was completely burnt down by the mobs.

=== Career in Pakistan ===
After seeing suffering from riots, he migrated to Pakistan in 1948. There, he continued his academic and political career, and served as a member of the Constituent Assembly of Pakistan. In 1949, he was appointed professor of history at the University of the Punjab, Lahore. He also joined the Government of Pakistan as Minister of Refugee Rehabilitation, and later as Minister of Education. Later on, he joined the Columbia University, New York where he wrote his famous book, the Muslim Community of the South Asia, as a story of the trials and tribulations of the Muslims in the South Asia.

In the late 1950s, Qureshi was brought back to Pakistan by Ayub Khan's martial regime to aid in the crafting of state's new education policy. On his return, he played a pivotal role in the establishment of the University of Karachi and remained its vice-chancellor for many years.

=== Political activities ===
- Elected to the Constituent Assembly of India, and then to the Constituent Assembly of Pakistan
- Between 1949–1954, he remained deputy minister, then minister of state and finally as minister with cabinet rank in Government of Pakistan.

== Historiography and reception ==
=== Background ===
Academic history writing had begun in the undivided subcontinent c. the first quarter of twentieth century. Thus emerged doyens like Chintaman Vinayak Vaidya, Jadunath Sarkar et al who, in the opinion of Peter Hardy, set the theme of discourse. By and large, Hindu (as well as British) historians stereotyped Muslim rulers as despotic barbarians who had inflicted unprecedented damage on India for centuries. Muslims were quite late to enter into the arena and their response was largely reactionary: aiming to recover unprejudiced histories of Muslim rule, they focused on explaining away ruptures like Mahmud's attack on Somnath, Aurangzeb's policy towards Sikh Gurus etc. In the process, a large number of "Muslim apologetic" histories were drafted with the explicit purpose of showing Muslims in a favorable light.

Qureshi was among the foremost historians of this generation. Beginning 1940s, as the Pakistan Movement gained strength, a section of Muslim historians became concerned with ensuring the historical legitimacy of the would-be state. To such ends, Qureshi traced a determinist narrative, where generations of Muslim rulers and subjects strove for the development of Muslim community in a foreign territory culminating in Jinnah's Pakistan.

=== Postcolonial Pakistan ===
Post 1947, the nation-state needed a new history, invented or not: Qureshi was close enough to the corridors of power and in the opinions of historian Ali Usman Qasmi, single-handedly bequeathed a master narrative of history that would be coopted into a variety of statist projects for the upcoming decades. The precise details of this narrative often underwent strategic shifts, as dictated by political needs of the state (Note: In a 1963 conference of the SEATO held at Thailand, Qureshi went all praises for the Buddhist history of Pakistan. He highlighted how Brahminical Hinduism (unlike Muslim rulers) obstructed the proliferation of an egalitarian Buddhism!) — however Qasmi cautions against considering Qureshi as a pen-for-hire; he genuinely believed in much of what he wrote and argued.

==== A Short History of India-Pakistan ====
As one of the six members of the Pakistan History Board, his first act of scholarship was the production of the first semi-official history of the state: A Short History of Hind-Pakistan (1955). The book gave an uncritical description of Muslim rulers (Note: The Delhi Sultanate is held to have treated Hindus "justly and generously - they provided unprecedent patronage to arts and culture.)—even glorifying figures as contentious as Mahmud (Note: Mahmud's raid on Somnatha is noted to be "an outstanding military feat in the annals of Islam" which "sent a thrill of joy through the Islamic world" and delighted the Caliph.) and Aurangzeb (Note: Aurangzeb is held to have executed Guru Tegh Bahadur since he disturbed peace in Punjab with a band of raiders alongside a Muslim rebel. The ceding away of Sikh population to India meant that provocative positions on these aspects were easier to take.)—and went lengths to emphasize upon the perennial nature of the two-nation thesis. (Note: It is highlighted how despite Akbar's Din-i-Ilahi movement, "the two nations—Hindus and Muslims—never merged into one.") Yet the Hindu ancientness was not wiped out or obfuscated or derided. (Note: Hindu scriptures like Mahabharata, Bhagavad Gita etc. are described without negative commentary. The Guptas are held to be the zenith of ancient Indian culture. Harshavardhan, Chalukyas et al are covered in substantial details.) As to the colonial period, peasant and labor movements were sanitized in what was a largely sympathetic presentation of the British Government; the focus remained exclusively upon the development of Muslim identity. In Qasmi's reading of the work, the history of Muslim India was reinterpreted to guide (and justify) the policies of the infant state: "fair (yet not equal) treatment of minorities, patronage of arts and culture, and the rule of law".

==== A Short History of Pakistan ====
In January 1965, Khan established a committee of eminent historians to write an authoritative account of the history of Pakistan under the general editorship of Qureshi. This account was meant to be a rigorous work, aimed at scholars and published by the Government itself. Unlike A Short History of Hind-Pakistan, this was set to have an exclusive focus on the history of current territories of Pakistan; dynasties or developments from the rest of subcontinent were to be mentioned only if they were relevant to the development of Pakistan. Treating the history of Pakistan as a branch of historical developments in India was also to be avoided at any cost; a keynote agreed upon by the committee notes that all political events in the subcontinent were to be discussed from within the frame of "the eastward expansion of West Pakistan and the westward expansion of East Pakistan."

To these ends, the four volumes of A Short History of Pakistan were published—the first volume covered pre-Muslim history; the second volume, Delhi Sultanate; the third, Mughals; and the last, Company (and British) rule. India became the common site of invasion, demonstrating the unity of East and West Pakistan in premodern times as in present. (Note: Thus, we have Aryan Migrants starting from Northwest Pakistan in their east-ward journey. Or, we have the Palas move from East Pakistan and conquer North India.)

==== The Muslim Community of the Indo-Pakistan Subcontinent ====
With time, Qureshi grew an unapologetic advocate of writing histories to serve ideological purposes: history made nations and he felt that it was one's solemn duty to instill a common version of the past among the citizens of a state to forge an unwavering loyalty. Such acts, to him, were not falsifications of history but rather, discovery of history in itself. In 1962, he published his magnum opus—The Muslim Community of the Indo-Pakistan Subcontinent (610–1947), drafted during his days at the Columbia University—chronicling, what Qasmi summarizes as, the struggle of Muslims to preserve an Islamic consciousness across a millennium against the advances of sponge-like Hinduism, practiced by the majority of population. This ever-strong Muslim consciousness was the byproduct of the canonical requirement of Muslims to establish a polity and thus, superseded linguistic or regional affiliations.

Satish Chandra (and Qasmi) found the work to be an exercise in "determinism with vengeance"; for Qureshi, the premodern history of Muslims in India was but a prelude to Pakistan where Islam could finally survive and flourish, under the political domination of Muslims.

==== Miscellaneous ====
In 1952, Fazlur Rahman— then, Minister of Education (Note: In undivided India, Rahman sat in the Executive Council of the University of Calcutta as well as the Royal Asiatic Society of Bengal. He had been long keen about correcting the perspective of mainstream history on Muslims: his speech at the Second Meeting of the Advisory Board of Education (Feb. 1949) had no other components!)—had convened another commission to draft an "authentic history" of "Muslim Freedom Movement" in "Indo-Pakistan Subcontinent" with Qureshi as a member. Writing the preface for the first volume (1957), Qureshi wrote how Akbar's syncretic policies had led to the downfall of Mughal Empire by weakening religious solidarity. (Note: Qasmi however notes the book to have been drafted in a scholarly manner, citing a host of Persian sources.) Feroz Ahmed, writes: "One of the favourite right-wing 'scholars' of the ruling alliance, I. H. Qureshi, went to the extent of stating that Bengalis were a different (implying inferior) race than the West Pakistanis."

== Awards and recognition ==
- In recognition of his services, he was decorated with the order of Sitara-e-Pakistan (Star of Pakistan) by the President of Pakistan.
- On 20 November 2001, Pakistan Post issued a commemorative postage stamp to honor him in its 'Men of Letters' series.
- The annual Ishtiaq Hussain Qureshi Memorial Lecture continues to be organised by the History Society of St. Stephen's College.
- Ishtiaq Hussain Qureshi was nominated as one of the founding members of Pakistan Academy of Letters in recognition of his services to Pakistani languages and literature.

== See also ==
- University of Karachi
- National Language Authority
