= Peter Hardy (historian) =

British historian (1922–2014)

Peter Hardy (1922–2014) was a Lecturer, and later Reader, at the School of Oriental and African Studies from 1947 to 1983. A specialist in the history of Islam, the Delhi Sultanate and Mughal India, he had particular expertise in Indo-Persian historiography. Among his many publications, Historians of Medieval India is highly regarded. His book Muslims of British India is a key work on the colonial period, often re-printed. Hardy's essay "Abul Fazl's Portrait of the Perfect Padshah" was the first attempt to critically reappraise Abu'l-Fazl ibn Mubarak and his political philosophy. His career has drawn the attention of Ian Brown in his history of SOAS.

== Key works ==
Historians of medieval India; studies in Indo-Muslim historical writing (London: Luzac, 1960)

Partners in freedom and true Muslims. The political thought of some Muslim scholars in British India 1912-1947 (Lund: Studentlitteratur, 1971) Scandinavian Institute of Asian Studies monograph series, no. 5 [Reprinted Westport, CT: Greenwood Press, 1980]

The Muslims of British India (London: Cambridge University Press, 1972) Cambridge South Asian studies, 13

"Approaches to pre-modern Indo-Muslim historical writing: some reconsiderations in 1990-1991", pp. 49–71 in Peter Robb, K. N. Chaudhuri, and Avril Powell, eds. Society and ideology: essays in South Asian history presented to professor K.A. Ballhatchet, (New Delhi: Oxford University Press, 1993.

"Didactic Historical Writing in Indian Islam: Ziya al-Din Barani's Treatment of the Reign of Sultan Muhammad Tughluq (1324-1351"), pp. 38–60 in Yohanan Friedmann, ed., Islam in Asia (Boulder: Westview Press, 1984)

"Islam and Muslims in South Asia" pp. 36–61 in Raphael Israeli, ed., The Crescent in the East: Islam in Asia Major (Atlantic Highlands, NJ: Humanities Press, 1982) Republished (London: Curzon, Riverdale, Md.: Riverdale Company, 1989)

"Islam in South Asia", pp. 143–164 in Joseph M. Kitagawa, ed., The Religious Traditions of Asia (New York: Macmillan, 1989)

"Some general characteristics analysed", pp. 169–179 in Richard M. Eaton, ed. India's Islamic Traditions, 711-1750 (New Delhi: Oxford University Press, 2003)
