= Ghayasuddin Pathan =

Pakistani politician

Ghayasuddin Pathan was a Pakistani politician who was a member of the first Constituent Assembly of Pakistan as a representative of East Pakistan.

== Career ==
Pathan was born in Mymensingh. He graduated from Dhaka University in 1921, and completed a law degree in 1926.

Pathan was a member of the Constituent Assembly of Pakistan. He served as the state minister of finance. Following the dismissal of the cabinet led by Khawaja Nizamuddin, he was appointed the state minister of agriculture, minority affairs, and parliamentary affairs in the cabinet of Chaudhry Muhammad Ali.
