= Guru Tegh Bahadur Nagar =

Guru Tegh Bahadur Nagar may refer to:

- Guru Tegh Bahadur Nagar, Delhi
- Guru Tegh Bahadur Nagar, Mumbai
