= Violence against women during the Partition of India =

During the partition of India, violence against women occurred extensively. It is estimated that during the partition between 75,000 and 100,000 women were kidnapped and raped. The rape of women by men during this period is well documented, with women sometimes also being complicit in these attacks. In March 1947, systematic violence against women started in Rawalpindi where Sikh women were targeted by Muslim mobs. Violence was also perpetrated on an organized basis, with Pathans taking Hindu and Sikh women from refugee trains while armed Sikhs periodically dragged Muslim women from their refugee column and killing any men who resisted, while the military sepoys guarding the columns did nothing.

It has been estimated that in the Punjab, the number of abducted Muslim women was double the number of abducted Hindu and Sikh women, because of the actions of coordinated Sikh jathas who were aided and armed by Sikh rulers of the 16 semi-autonomous princely states in Punjab which overlapped the expected partition border, and had been preparing to oust the Muslims from East Punjab in case of partition. Lists provided by India contained names of 33,000 Hindu and Sikh women to be repatriated from Pakistan (this did not include women from Kashmir and it was felt that if these were added the figure could have well reached 50,000), while the lists supplied by Pakistan contained 21,000 names of women to be repatriated from India. India and Pakistan later worked to repatriate the abducted women. Muslim women were to be sent to Pakistan and Hindu and Sikh women to India.

== Background ==
During partition Punjabi society was affected at all levels by murder, displacement and assault. Rival communities targeted women to humiliate them and actions against women included rape, abduction and forcible conversions. Violence against women also occurred in Jammu and Kashmir and the Rajputana states.

== Violence ==
In contrast to earlier riots, women were victimised in the direct action day riots in Calcutta. Many Hindu women were kidnapped during the Noakhali violence. Anti-women violence occurred during the 1946 massacres of Muslims in Bihar. Thousands were kidnapped just in Patna district. Muslim women in Bihar committed suicide by jumping into wells. In November 1946, Muslim women were subjected to stripping, nude processions and rape by Hindu mobs in the town of Garhmukteshwar. In Amritsar, Sikhs paraded naked Punjabi Muslim women, who were then publicly raped before being set fire to in the street.

Systematic violence against women started in March 1947 in Rawalpindi where Sikh women were targeted by Muslim mobs. Numerous Hindu and Sikh villages were wiped out. Huge numbers of Hindus and Sikhs were killed, forcibly converted, often circumcised in public, children were kidnapped and women were abducted, paraded naked, raped publicly and 'roasted alive after their flesh had satisfied carnal lust'. The official figure of death in Rawalpindi stood at 2,263. Before further attacks many Sikh women committed suicide by jumping in water wells to save honour and avoid conversion.

Sikh political leaders had considered plans for the eventual expulsion of Muslims from East Punjab in case of a partition leading up to the event. Tara Singh, a member of Shiromani Akali Dal and principle Sikh leader during the partition said “We took the decision to turn the Muslims out" years before the event. Intending to oust the Muslims in East Punjab to provide lands for the incoming Sikh population from West Punjab. Several districts in Punjab, including Patiala, Faridkot and Nabha were governed by Sikh leaders and reported to have been arming and providing safe haven for Sikh marauding groups in anticipation of partition.

Violence was also perpetrated on an organized basis, with local men taking Hindu and Sikh women from refugee trains while one observer witnessed armed Sikhs periodically dragging Muslim women from their refugee column and killing any men who resisted, while the military sepoys guarding the columns did nothing.

Both Sikh and Muslim communities also cited revenge as a reason for their attacks. The scholar Andrew Major notes that the large-scale abduction and rape of girls seemed to have been a part of systematic 'ethnic cleansing' in the Gurgaon region on the outskirts of Delhi. There was a nude procession of Muslim women in Amritsar.

In retaliation, in the streets of Sialkot, Sikh and Hindu women were paraded naked in public and mass raping took place the same as was in Amritsar. The same atrocities were repeated in Sheikhupura, Pakistan. Children would be snatched from their parents, tossed on spears and swords, and sometimes thrown alive into the fire. Hindu and Sikh women's breasts, noses and arms would be lopped off. Sticks and pieces of iron would be thrust into their private parts. Bellies of pregnant women were ripped open and the unformed life in the womb thrown out.

Although many influential men such as deputy commissioners and police officials tried to prevent abductions or rescue the victims, many other men abused their positions of authority, such as the Maharaja of Patiala who was holding a Muslim girl from a reputable family. Known perpetrators included police officials, landed magnates and Muslim League members as well as criminal elements. Armed Pathans in particular were considered the worst offenders, particularly in the Rawalpindi district. a large number of non-Muslim women from Kashmir were abducted and sold in West Punjab and these sold women often ended up as 'slave girls' in factories. By early 1948, Pathans started abducting even Muslim women of Punjabi and Kashmiri background.

In East Punjab, local police and the Indian military frequently engaged in the abduction and distribution of Punjabi Muslim women besides the Sikh jathas and refugees from West Punjab. According to Anis Kidwai, the 'better stuff' would be distributed among the police and army while the remaining were distributed among the rest of the attackers. In the villages around Delhi, police and army soldiers participated in the rape of Muslim women.

=== Estimates of abductions ===
The exact figures of abducted women are unknown and estimates vary. Leonard Mosley wrote that in total 100,000 girls were abducted on all sides. The Indian government estimated that there were 33,000 Hindu and Sikh women in Pakistan and the Pakistani government estimated that there were 50,000 Muslim women abducted in India. Andrew Major estimates that 40–45,000 women in total were abducted in Punjab during the Partition riots, with approximately twice as many Muslim women as Hindu and Sikh women having been abducted. Masroor estimates that 60,000 Muslim women were abducted while Begum Tassaduq Hussain estimated that 90,000 Muslim women were abducted.

Others estimate that more Hindu and Sikh women were victims of violence as compared to Muslim women, for instance Urvashi Butalia, who specializes in Partition violence against women, says that anywhere from 25,000 to 29,000 Hindu and Sikh women were concerned as compared to 12,000 to 15,000 Muslim women, numbers which have been endorsed by Indian scholars Roshni Sharma and Priyanca Mathur Velath as well by historian Anwesha Sengupta. Gurbachan Singh Talib estimates that 50,000 Hindu and Sikh women were abducted in West Pakistan while M. A. Khan puts the figure at 100,000. Mridula Sarabhai, who was engaged in recovering and rehabilitating women and championing their cause with both governments, estimated that some 125,000 Hindu and Sikh women had been kidnapped by Muslims in Pakistan.

== Recoveries ==
In September 1947 both the Indian Prime Minister Nehru and Pakistani Prime Minister Liaquat Ali Khan vowed not to recognize the forced marriages and both countries ratified this agreement in the Inter-Dominion Conference in December which established the recovery procedure.

The job of compiling claims for abducted women by their relatives fell on the Central Recovery Offices in both countries. The task of locating abducted women was given to local police who would be assisted with the guidance of the abducted women's relatives. Social workers and District Liaison Officers who were appointed by the Liaison Agency of the opposite Punjab government also provided much assistance. Non-Muslim women recovered from Pakistan were housed in District transit camps, the Central camp being in Lahore. A similar camp was established for Muslim women in Jalandhar. The Indian and Pakistani Military Evacuation Organization were established to guard and escort women to their respective countries.

Recoveries eventually slowed down with Nehru admitting in January 1948, "Neither side has really tried hard enough to recover them". Because Hindu and Sikh refugees in India mistakenly thought that the number of abducted non-Muslim women exceeded the number of abducted Muslim women they mounted a public campaign and demanded that Muslim women be held up from recoveries as hostages. Eventually the two countries agreed to not publicize the figures of women repatriated. India and Pakistan's rivalry also slowed the pace of recoveries.

Pakistan claimed that the slow recoveries were because many Hindus and Sikhs refused to take back their women as they considered them 'defiled', an argument which Nehru accepted while accusing Pakistan of being uncooperative. Heavy rains and flooding also slowed the pace of recoveries in West Punjab and in January 1948 Pakistan prohibited Indian officials from entering those districts of Punjab which bordered Kashmir.

Many women also refused to be recovered, fearing being shamed and rejected by their families and communities while some women had adjusted to their new 'families' and hence refused to return. By 1954 both governments agreed that women should not be forcibly repatriated.

=== Number of recoveries ===
Between December 1947 and December 1949, 6000 women were recovered from Pakistan and 12,000 from India. Most recoveries were made, in order of succession, from East and West Punjab, Jammu, Kashmir and Patiala. Over the eight-year period 30,000 women had been repatriated by both governments. The number of Muslim women recovered was significantly higher; 20,728 against 9,032 non-Muslim women. Most recoveries were made in the period between 1947 and 1952. although some recoveries were made as late as 1956.

Between 6 December 1947 and 31 March 1952, the number of non-Muslim women recovered from Pakistan was 8,326. 5,616 of them were from Punjab, 459 from NWFP, 10 from Balochistan, 56 from Sind and 592 from Bahawalpur. After 21 January 1949, 1,593 non-Muslim women were recovered from Jammu and Kashmir.

In the same time period the number of Muslim women recovered from India had been 16,545. Of them 11,129 were from Punjab, 4,934 from Patiala and East Punjab Union and after 21 January 1949 the number of Muslim women recovered from Jammu and Kashmir was 482. The number of Muslim women recovered from Delhi was 200.

== See also ==
- The 1947 Partition Archive
- Opposition to the partition of India

== Bibliography ==
- Major, Andrew (1995), "Abduction of women during the partition of the Punjab", South Asia: Journal of South Asian Studies, 18 (1), doi:10.1080/00856409508723244
- Kiran, Naumana (2017), "Punjab Migration 1947: Violence against Muslim Women and the Settlement", South Asian Studies, 32 (1)
- Ravinder Kaur (2014). "Bodies of Partition: Of Widows, Residue and Other Historical waste". Penn University Press.

Books

- Barbara D. Metcalf; Thomas R. Metcalf (24 September 2012). A Concise History of Modern India. Cambridge University Press. ISBN 978-1-139-53705-6.
- Daiya, Kavita (2011). Violent belongings : partition, gender and postcolonial nationalism in India. Philadelphia, Pa.: Temple University Press. ISBN 978-1592137442.
- Khan, Yasmin (2008). The great Partition : the making of India and Pakistan. New Haven: Yale University Press. ISBN 978-0300143331.
- Kakar, Sudhir (1996). The colors of violence : cultural identities, religion, and conflict. Chicago: University of Chicago Press. ISBN 0226422852.
