= Mujahid Gangal =

- Interactive map of Mujahid Gangal
- Coordinates: 33°21′00″N 73°08′52″E
- Country: Pakistan
- Province: Punjab
- Division: Rawalpindi
- District: Rawalpindi
- Postal code: 47651

Mujahid Gangal is a village in the Bassali Union Council of the Rawalpindi Tehsil in Rawalpindi District, Punjab, Pakistan. Its postcode is 47651, and its coordinates are 33°21′00″N 73°08′52″E. The village has a government elementary school for boys, with 126 students, and one for girls with 152 students.

== External links ==
- Google Maps Location
