= Ghulam Sarwar Hussaini =

Pakistani politician

Syed Shah Ghulam Sarwar Hussaini
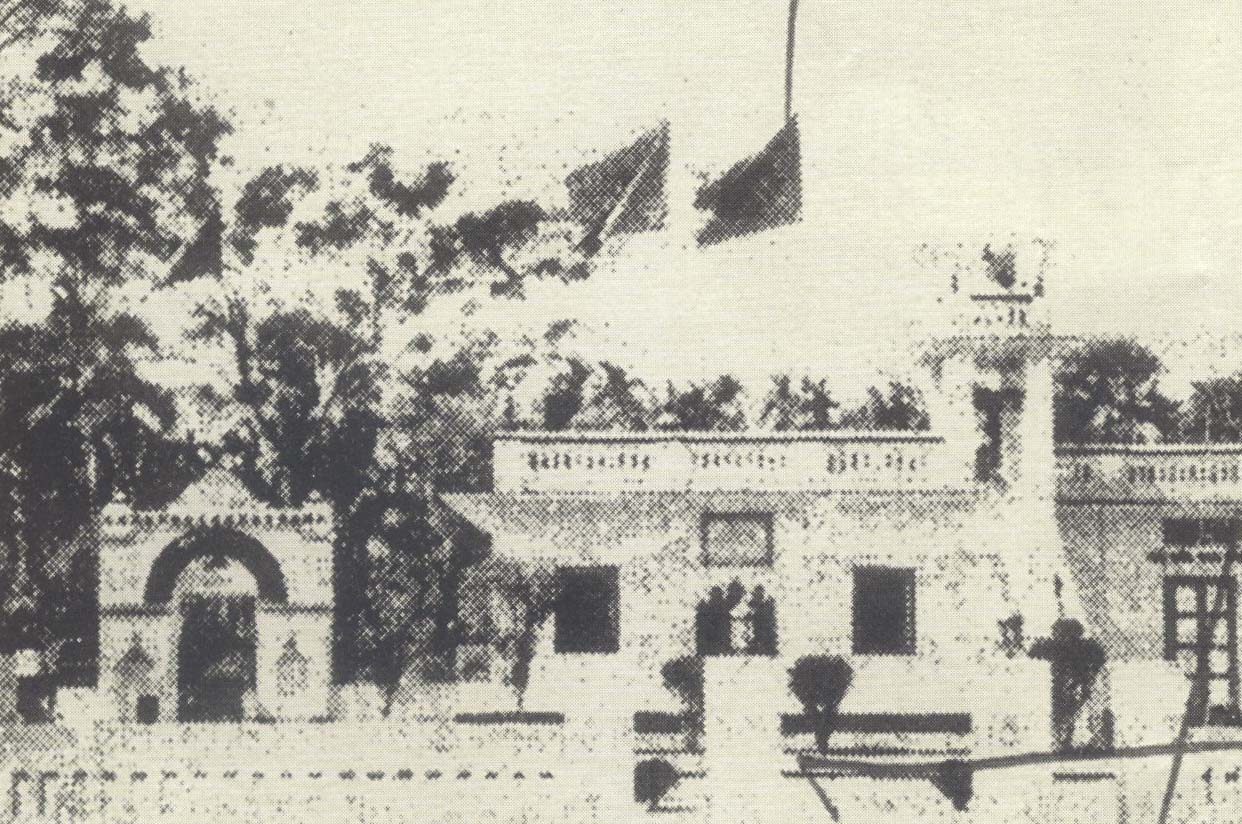
- Shyampur shrine was the early residence of Ghulam Sarwar Hussaini

Personal life
- Born: Shyampur, British India
- Died: 9 September 1971 Maijdee, Pakistan

Religious life
- Religion: Islam
- Denomination: Sunni Islam
- Jurisprudence: Hanafi

Member of the East Bengal Legislative Assembly for Noakhali Sadar North-West (Muslim)
- In office 1954–1958
- Leader: A. K. Fazlul Huq; Abu Hussain Sarkar; Ataur Rahman Khan
- Preceded by: constituency established
- Succeeded by: constituency dissolved

Member of the Bengal Legislative Assembly for Ramganj-cum-Raipur (Muslim)
- In office 1937–1945
- Leader: A. K. Fazlul Huq; Khwaja Nazimuddin
- Preceded by: constituency established
- Succeeded by: Fazlul Karim

Personal details
- Party: KSP (1953–1958)
- Other political affiliations: KPP (1937–1947)

Ghulam Sarwar Hussaini (Bengali: গোলাম সারোয়ার হুসেইনী, Urdu: غلام سرور حسینی) was a Pakistani lawyer, peasant leader, politician, and religious leader. He is known for his role during the Noakhali riots of 1946.

== Birth and lineage ==
Hussaini was born in Shyampur, Ramganj Thana, Lakshmipur subdivision, Noakhali District, Bengal Presidency, British India. His paternal ancestors were known as Sufi pirs of Shyampur shrine. Syed Shah Zakiuddin Hussaini, the paternal ancestors of Hussaini's forebear, lived in Ottoman Iraq. In 1815–1816, he came to Shyampur from Chittagong region's Patiya, began preaching Islam, and established the shrine there. His family were hereditary custodians of Shyampur shrine.

== Politics in British India ==
Hussaini was an influential leader of the Noakhali Peasants' Association. He became a target of hostility among the powerful Hindu zamindars and moneylenders of Noakhali by leading movements for the remission of peasants' rent, the removal of moneylenders from debt arbitration boards, and the boycott of zamindari markets. The Indian National Congress (INC) wanted to admit him as a party member, but this did not materialize because of his poor relations with Noakhali's elite society. Later, in 1937, he was elected to the Bengal Legislative Assembly from Ramganj as a nominee of the Krishak Praja Party (KPP), but he was defeated in 1946.

Chittaranjan Ray Chaudhuri, a politician and zamindar of Raipur, was unable to accept the growing political power of Muslims in Noakhali. This led to a conflict between him and Hussaini. Hussaini wrote to various INC leaders, including Mahatma Gandhi, informing them of the zamindar's oppression and requesting action against him. Receiving no response, he called for armed resistance against Chaudhuri himself. As a result, a paramilitary force known as the Miyan's force was formed under his leadership.

== Noakhali riots ==
In 1946, following the Great Calcutta Killings, a rumour spread in Ramganj that Sadhu Triambakananda, a Hindu saint, who was a guest at the house of zamindar Rajendralal Chaudhuri, had instructed Muslims to be sacrificed for a ritual. To discuss the matter, Hussaini sent a letter to the zamindar through a village watchman. However, after receiving no response, he organized a gathering at Shahpur Bazaar for his devoted followers and local Muslims. There, he called for the overthrow of the zamindar. Allegedly, the Noakhali riots broke out only after he ordered the killing of the zamindar and the saint at the gathering. Meanwhile, when the Miyan's and Kahsem's force laid siege to the house of Chittaranjan Ray Chaudhuri, the zamindar killed members of his own family and committed suicide. As a result, communal violence escalated sharply in the plains of Tripura and the Bhulua region.

== Later life, death and legacy ==
After the partition of Bengal and independence of Pakistan in 1947, Hussaini participated in the 1954 provincial election and elected as a member of East Bengal Legislative Assembly from the constituency of Noakhali Sadar North-West (Muslim).

On 9 September 1971, during the Bangladesh Liberation War, Hussaini was killed by a group of freedom fighters at his own residence in Maijdee, Noakhali.

Hussaini was well known for his role in the Noakhali riots. In the 2025 Indian film The Bengal Files, Namashi Chakraborty portrayed Hussaini's character.
