= Hindusthan National Guard =

Volunteer social organization

Hindusthan National Guard (Bengali: হিন্দুস্থান ন্যাশনাল গার্ড) was a volunteer social organization launched by Dr. Shyama Prasad Mookerjee, the president of the Akhil Bharatiya Hindu Mahasabha in the aftermath of the Great Calcutta Killings in 1946 to protect the people affected in the riots.
