= Yasmin Khan (disambiguation) =

Yasmin Khan (born 1977) is a British historian specialising in the history of British India.

Yasmin Khan may also refer to:

- Yasmin Khan (Doctor Who), a fictional character in the Doctor Who franchise
- Yasmin Khan (writer) (born 1981), British food writer
- Yasmin Aga Khan (born 1949), Swiss-born American philanthropist

== See also ==
- Yasmeen Khan (disambiguation)
