= Lalmohan (disambiguation) =

Lalmohan is a town in Bangladesh.

Lalmohan may also refer to:

- Lalmohan Upazila, a subdistrict of Bhola District in Bangladesh

== People ==
- Lalmohan Ghosh, 1849–1909, President of the Indian National Congress
- Lalmohan Sen, 1909–1949, Indian revolutionary
- Lalmohan Ganguly, fictional crime-fiction author in the Feluda stories written by Satyajit Ray
