= Yasmeen Khan =

Yasmeen Khan may refer to:

- Yasmeen Khan (cricketer) (born 1999), Namibian cricketer
- Yasmeen Khan (actress) (1950–1999), Pakistani film actress

== See also ==
- Yasmin Khan (disambiguation)
