= Raghib Ahsan =

Indian politician

Raghib Ahsan was a politician and member of the Constituent Assembly of India. He was an advisor to Muhammad Ali Jinnah. He is known for working in the creation of both the constitution of India and Pakistan.

== Early life and education ==
Ahsan was born in 1905. He completed his bachelor's degree and master's from the University of Calcutta.

== Career ==
Ahsan was in the Khilafat Movement led by Shaukat Ali and Mohammad Ali Jauhar. He was also a close associate to Muhammad Iqbal. In 1922, he was imprisoned. He formed the All India Muslim Youth League. In 1937, he joined the All India Muslim League Council. He was one of the main leaders of the Direct Action Day in 1946 in Kolkata.

Ahsan migrated to Dhaka, Pakistan, after the Partition of India and helped in the drafting the constitution of Pakistan. He formed the Anjuman-e-Mohajreen-wal-Ansar to lead the Mahajir immigrant community in East Pakistan who had migrated from India. He served as the General Secretary of the Bihar Muslim Relief Committee in Bengal.

In Pakistan, Ahsan joined the Pakistan Democratic Party. He opposed the Independence of Bangladesh and moved to Karachi after Bangladesh became an independent country.

== Death ==
Ahsan died in 1975.
