= 1946 Bihar riots =

Anti-Muslim riots in Bihar, India

- Date: 24 October 1946 – 11 November 1946
- Location: Bihar, British India

Communal riots occurred in Bihar, India from 24 October to 11 November 1946, in which Hindu mobs targeted Muslim families. The riots were triggered by the Great Calcutta Killings, as well as the Noakhali riots earlier that year. Mahatma Gandhi declared that he would fast unto death if the riots did not stop. The riots were part of a sequence of communal violence that culminated in the partition of India.

== Background ==
The 1946 Bihar riots were part of a series of incidents of communal violence that occurred across North India. The frequency of such riots increased in the 1930s and 1940s; in 1945 alone, 1,809 riots took place in Uttar Pradesh, and 3,176 riots took place across North India in 1946. On 16 August 1946, the All-India Muslim League proclaimed Direct Action Day in Calcutta, as part of their demand for a separate state for Muslims. Major riots ensued across the city, with 4,000 people being killed. These riots triggered communal violence across North India, including in Bihar. The Noakhali riots that occurred from 10 to 21 October also provoked violence in Bihar.

=== June riots ===
The trigger for the riots that occurred in June was a dispute concerning a false allegation that a woman whom Hindus stated had been abducted by Muslims. In the village of Andhana, a group of Hindus demanding that the woman be brought forward became violent and were fired upon by Muslims, leading to two fatalities. Hindus killed four Muslims.

=== September riots ===
More riots occurred in September 1946, once again triggered by a dispute over the alleged abduction of Noor Jahan, formerly known as Kalyani Devi. A group of 30,000 Hindus led by members of the Arya Samaj attempted to rescue Noor Jahan in the belief that she had been kidnapped from Calcutta during the Direct Action Day riots. The failure of this rescue attempt turned into a riot, in which 200 houses belonging to 144 Muslim families were burned down, and 14 people were killed.

== October–November riots ==
The largest riots of the year occurred from 27 October to 6 November, during which period a large number of Muslims were killed by Hindus in retaliation for the Noakhali riots that had occurred earlier that month. There was wide variation in estimates of the number of casualties. A statement given to the British Parliament put the death toll at 5,000. The Statesman estimated the number of fatalities at between 7,500 and 10,000, while the Indian National Congress put it at 2,000. Mohammed Ali Jinnah of the Muslim League stated that 30,000 people had been killed. An unofficial report on 8 November stated that 500 people had been killed in one incident in which a village in Munger district was leveled by fire, and 100 people had died when a mob was fired upon by the military. Another estimate stated that 35,000 had fled the fighting.

The riots were severe enough that Jawaharlal Nehru, then the head of the interim government, threatened to bombard rioters from the air. A statement from the provincial capital of Patna stated that military forces had been deployed against the rioters, and inflicted heavy casualties on them. Some historians have stated that the province's Hindu premier did not permit British troops to fire on Hindu rioters. Others point out that the government was eventually able to put a stop to the violence in Bihar, unlike in other regions.

On 5 November, Mahatma Gandhi, who was in Calcutta, visiting riot-stricken areas, stated that he would fast unto death if the violence in Bihar did not stop within 24 hours. His statement was broadcast nationally by Congress leader Rajendra Prasad. At the time, official reports stated that 400 people had been killed, while leaders of the Muslim league said the real toll was 5,000–8,000 people. Mohammad Yunus, a leader of the Muslim league, asked Muslims to observe the festival of Bakr-Eid, which occurred on 5 November, as a day of mourning. On the same day as Gandhi's announcement, Jawaharlal Nehru issued a statement, saying "We must put an end to this madness; we can argue later," and added "What has happened and what is happening in certain parts of Bihar province is terrible and I can hardly believe that human beings can behave in such a manner."

== Aftermath ==
Following the riots, the Muslim League said that it had received a large number of complaints from its members, which stated that they were afraid to leave their homes. On 17 November, the Muslim League passed a resolution asking the Viceroy of India to act on the riots in Bihar. The resolution stated that Muslims in Bihar still felt a threat "to life or property," and that the disturbances might easily spread. The resolution also stated that Hugh Dow, the governor of Bihar, and the Indian National Congress were responsible for the massacre.

At the time, the Muslim League stated that Hindu mobs had killed as many as 30,000 people in the province. British and Indian government sources place the death toll between 5,000 and 7,000. Historians such as Suranjan Das have referred to the Great Calcutta Killings of 1946 as the first explicitly political communal violence in the region.

== Notes and references ==
=== Sources ===
- Das, Suranjan (April 2000). "The 1992 Calcutta Riot in Historical Continuum: A Relapse into 'Communal Fury'?". Modern Asian Studies. 34 (2). Cambridge University Press: 281–306. doi:10.1017/s0026749x0000336x. JSTOR 313064. S2CID 144646764.
- Ghosh, Papiya (January 1994). "The Virile and the Chaste in Community and Nation Making: Bihar 1920's to 1940's". Social Scientist. 22 (1): 80–94. doi:10.2307/3517853. JSTOR 3517853.
- Kausar, Zeenath (December 2006). "Communal Riots in India: Hindu–Muslim Conflict and Resolution". Journal of Muslim Minority Affairs. 26 (3): 353–370. doi:10.1080/13602000601141323. S2CID 145443416.
- Khan, Yasmin (2007). The Great Partition: The Making of India and Pakistan. Yale University Press. ISBN 9780300120783.
- Markovitz, Claude. "Online Encyclopedia of Mass Violence".
- Mitra, Asok (3 February 1990). "The Great Calcutta Killings of 1946: What Went before and After". Economic and Political Weekly. 25 (5): 273–285. JSTOR 4395903.
- "Gandhi Threatens Fast Unto Death". The New York Times. 6 November 1946.
- "Indian Moslems Ask Action on Bihar Riots". The New York Times. 18 November 1946.
- Stephens, Ian (1963). Pakistan. New York: Frederick A. Praeger.
- Wilkinson, Steven I. (2006). Votes and Violence: Electoral Competition and Ethnic Riots in India. Cambridge: Cambridge University Press. ISBN 9780521536059.
- "Death to 500 as Riots sweep India Province". The Washington Post. 9 November 1946.
