= Dhamali Kallar Syedan =

Dhamali
- Town
- Location within Pakistan
- Coordinates: 33°26′1″N 73°26′35″E
- Country: Pakistan
- Tehsil: Kallar Syedan
- District: Rawalpindi
- Time zone: UTC+5 (PST)

Dhamali is a Town in Kallar Syedan Tehsil of Rawalpindi District in the Punjab Province of Pakistan. A government school for girls is also located here.
