= Lalmohan Sen =

Indian revolutionary who took part in the Chittagong Armoury Raid (1909-1946)

Lalmohan Sen লালমোহন সেন
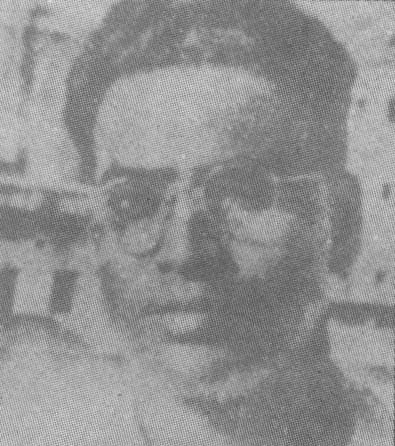
- Born: 1909; Sandwip, Eastern Bengal and Assam, British India
- Died: 11 October 1946 (aged 36–37); Sandwip, Bengal, British India
- Occupation: Revolutionary
- Political party: Communist Party of India

Lalmohan Sen (Bengali: লালমোহন সেন) was a Bengali revolutionary who took part in the Chittagong Armoury Raid. He was imprisoned for 16 years. Shortly after his release, he was murdered in the Noakhali riots.

== Early life ==
Sen was born in the island of Sandwip, off the coast of Chittagong, in the district of Noakhali, in a Bengali Kayastha family some time around 1909. During his childhood he attended a normal school in the mainland, in the town of Chittagong. After school he took up medicine in his higher studies.

== Career ==
While in the college, Sen was drawn into the revolutionary activities of the Indian Republican Army, led by Surya Sen. Once he broke the safe of his uncle to raise funds for the revolutionary cause. Sen played an active part during the Chittagong Armoury Raid. He sabotaged the transport in Chittagong before the raid. He was sentenced to life imprisonment for his involvement in the incident and deported to the Andaman. After spending sixteen years in the Andaman Cellular Jail and other jails, he was finally released on parole from Dhaka jail in 1946.

== Death ==
According to Sandip Bandyopadhyay, Sen was drawn towards communism during his imprisonment and subsequently joined the Communist Party of India after his release. In August, 1946, he went back to his native place in the island of Sandwip. Later in the middle of October, when the Hindus were being massacred in mainland Noakhali, the marauding mobs began attacking the Hindus in Sandwip as well. Sen died, when he went to resist the Muslim mob from killing the Hindus.

== See also ==
- Chittagong Armoury Raid
- Noakhali genocide
