= Yasmin Khan (writer) =

Author, food and travel writer, cook

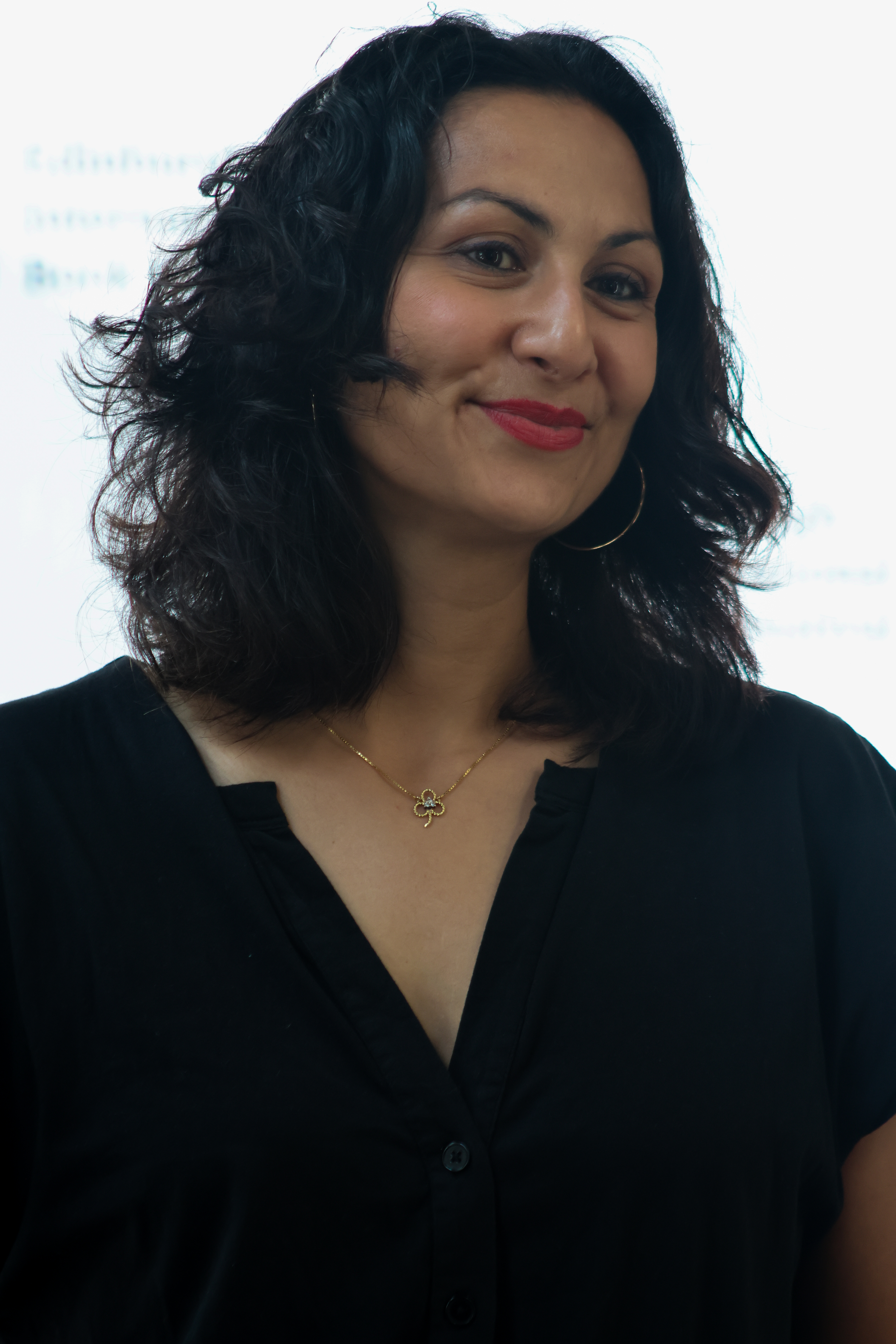
- Khan at Edinburgh International Book Festival 2026
- Born: 1981 (age 44–45); Croydon, Greater London, England
- Occupations: Writer, broadcaster, campaigner

Yasmin Khan is a British author, broadcaster and human rights campaigner. Her work covers food, travel and politics and her critically acclaimed books, The Saffron Tales and Zaitoun, use everyday stories to challenge stereotypes of the Middle East.

== Biography ==
Khan was born to a Pakistani father and an Iranian mother in Croydon and grew up in Birmingham. After earning a Bachelor of Laws from the University of Sheffield and a Master of Science in Social Policy and Planning from the London School of Economics, Khan went on to work as a campaigner for numerous British charities and human rights groups including INQUEST and War on Want. With the Newham Monitoring Project she helped set up the Justice4Jean campaign trying to get justice for the family of Jean Charles de Menezes after he was killed by the Metropolitan police.

In 2013, she launched a Kickstarter project to create a food and travel book that would share recipes and stories from Iran, the country of her mother's birth. This project eventually became Khan's debut book, The Saffron Tales: Recipes and stories from the Persian kitchen, published by Bloomsbury Publishing in 2016, and described by The New York Times, The Wall Street Journal and BBC Food Programme as one of the best cookbooks of the year.

Khan's second book Zaitoun: Recipes and Stories From the Palestinian Kitchen, chronicles her culinary travels through Palestinian kitchens, the West Bank and the Gaza Strip. It was published in the UK in 2018 by Bloomsbury and was called one of the best cookbooks of the year by The Guardian, The Observer, The Independent and the BBC Food Programme. It was published in the US in 2019 by W.W. Norton and has been received with much critical acclaim.

Khan has worked as a presenter for BBC Radio 4's The Food Programme and CNN/Roads and Kingdoms' series The Perfect Dish with Anthony Bourdain. She is a regular media commentator, having appeared on flagship programmes such as Newsnight, the Today programme and Woman's Hour, and has written for a variety of publications, including The Guardian, the Telegraph, the New Statesman, Saveur, Afar, Food52 and Roads and Kingdoms.

Khan has delivered motivational speeches around the world on issues relating to activism and social change, human rights in the Middle East, and burnout and career change.
