= Bassali =

Pakistani village

- Village
- Location within Pakistan
- Coordinates: 33.39°N 73.13°E
- Country: Pakistan
- Province: Punjab (Pakistan)
- District: Rawalpindi
- Elevation: 682 m (2,238 ft)
- Time zone: UTC+5 (PST)

Bassali is a village in Rawalpindi, Punjab located on Chak Beli Khan Rawat road. Bassali falls within the NA-59 Chakwal-cum-Talagang constituency of Rawalpindi Tehsil.

== Telecommunication ==
The PTCL provides the main network of landline telephone. Many ISPs and all major mobile phone, Wireless companies operating in Pakistan provide service in Bassali.

== Languages ==
Punjabi is the primary language spoken in Bassali, while Urdu and Pahari-Pothwari are also commonly used.
