= Noakhali riots =

1946 anti-Hindu riots in East Bengal

Noakhali Riots
- Part of Partition of Bengal (1947)
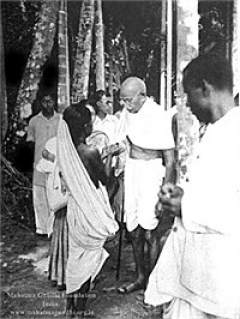
- Gandhi listens to a survivor in Noakhali, 1946
- Location: Noakhali Region, Bengal, British India
- Date: 10 October 1946 – early November 1946
- Target: Bengali Hindus
- Deaths: ~200 (official estimate); 285 Hindus (Sukumar Roy)

The Noakhali riots were a series of semi-organised massacres, rapes, and abductions of Hindus, combined with looting and arson of Hindu properties, perpetrated by Muslim mobs in the districts of Noakhali in the Chittagong Division of the eastern part of British Bengal (present-day Bangladesh) from October to November 1946, a year before India's independence from British rule.

It affected the areas under the Ramganj, Begumganj, Raipur, Lakshmipur, Chhagalnaiya, and Sandwip police stations in Noakhali district and the areas under the Hajiganj, Faridganj, Chandpur, Laksham, and Chauddagram police stations in Tipperah district, a total area of more than 2,000 square miles.

The massacre of the Hindu population started on 10 October, on the day of Kojagari Lakshmi Puja, and continued unabated for about a week. Around 50,000 Hindus were marooned in the affected areas subordinate to the Muslim radicals.

Mahatma Gandhi camped in Noakhali for four months and toured the district on a mission to restore peace and communal harmony. In the meantime, the Indian National Congress leadership started to accept the proposed Partition of India, and the peace mission and other relief camps were abandoned. The majority of the survivors migrated to West Bengal, Tripura, and Assam in post-partition India.

== Cause ==
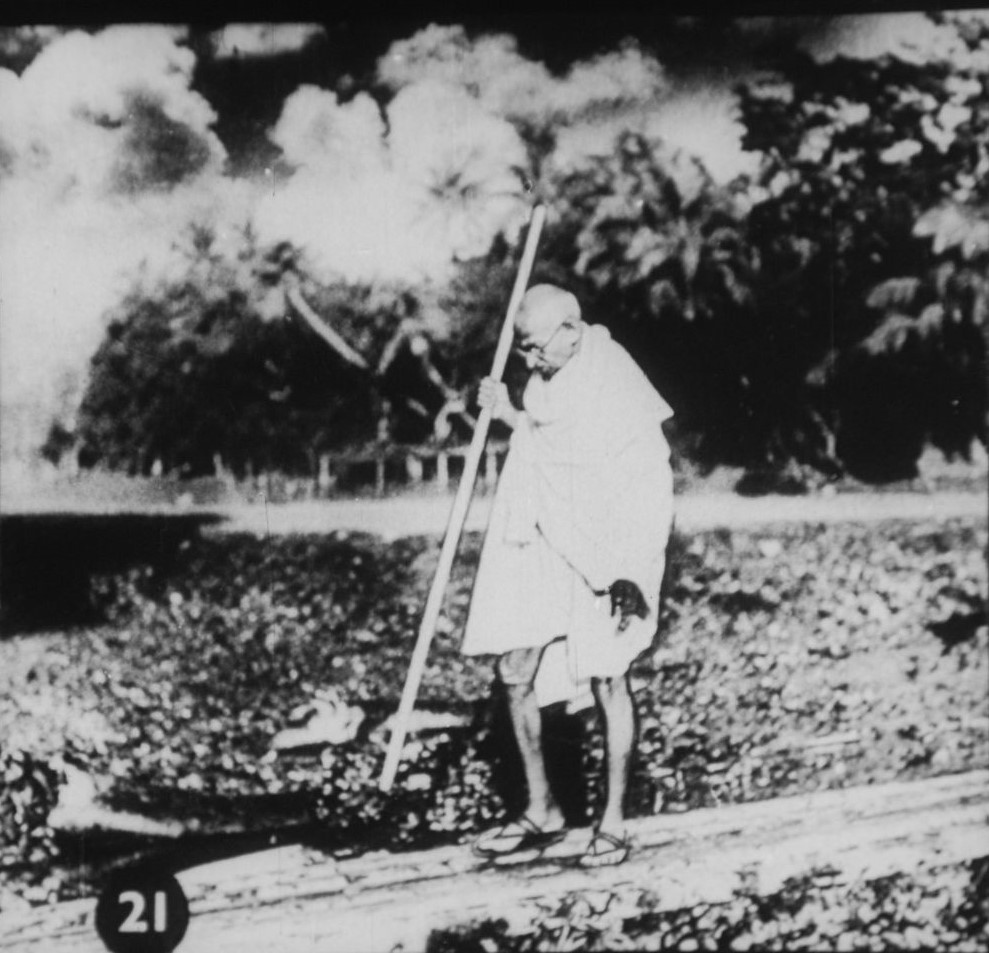
Gandhi visiting in the division in October–November 1946.

On 10 October 1946, during the festival of Kojagari Lakshmi Puja, a rumor reportedly spread in the Ramganj police station area (now in Lakshmipur District) that a Hindu monk named Triambakananda had visited the residence of Rajendralal Chowdhury, a local Hindu landlord. He has announced that from now on, instead of goats for worship, he will appease the goddess by offering the "blood of Muslims". The rumor quickly inflamed communal tensions in the surrounding area.

In nearby Shyampur Dayara Sharif, Gulam Sarwar Hossain, a local pir, learned of the alleged declaration and sent a letter to Rajendralal Chowdhury on the morning of 10 October seeking clarification. Receiving no reply, Hossain called a public meeting at Sahapur Bazaar, where he informed local Muslims of the rumor and urged them to act against the Hindu landlord. Following the gathering, mobs attacked Hindu-owned shops in Sahapur Bazaar, looting and setting them on fire.

On the following morning, 11 October 1946, violent crowds advanced to Chowdhury's residence, killed him, and allegedly presented his beheaded head to Gulam Sarwar Hossain on a silver platter. Subsequently, the riots started.

== Prelude ==
Communal tensions in Noakhali began soon after the Great Calcutta Riots between Muslims and Hindus. Although initially quiet, tensions had been building. During the six weeks leading up to the disturbances in Noakhali, the Eastern Command headquarters in Kolkata received reports indicating unrest in the rural areas of Noakhali and Chittagong districts. Village poets and balladeers composed anti-Hindu poems and rhymes, which they recited in marketplaces and other public gatherings.

=== Eid al-Fitr violence ===
On 29 August, the day of Eid al-Fitr, tensions escalated into violence. A rumor spread that Hindus had accumulated weapons. A group of Hindu fishermen were attacked with deadly weapons while fishing in the Feni River. One was killed, and two were seriously injured. Another group of nine Hindu fishermen from Charuriah were severely assaulted. Seven were admitted to the hospital. Devi Prasanna Guha, the son of a Congressman from Babupur village under the Ramganj police station, was murdered. His brother and a servant were also assaulted. The Congress office in front of their house was set on fire. Chandra Kumar Karmakar of Monpura was killed near Jamalpur. Jamini Dey, a hotel worker, was killed near Ghoshbag. Ashu Sen of Devisinghpur was severely beaten at Tajumiarhat at Char Parvati. Rajkumar Choudhury of Banspara was severely assaulted on his way home.

The properties of six or seven Hindu families in Kanur Char were looted. In Karpara, a Muslim gang armed with deadly weapons entered the house of Jadav Majumdar and looted properties worth Rs. 1,500. Nakul Majumdar was assaulted. The houses of Prasanna Mohan Chakraborty of Tatarkhil, Nabin Chandra Nath of Miralipur, and Radha Charan Nath of Latipur were looted. Five members of the Nath family of Latipur were injured. The temple of the family deity of Harendra Ghosh of Raipur was desecrated: a calf was butchered and thrown inside the temple. The Shiva temple of Dr. Jadunath Majumdar of Chandipur was similarly desecrated. The household shrines of Nagendra Majumdar and Rajkumar Choudhury of Dadpur were desecrated, and the idols were stolen. The Durga images of Ishwar Chandra Pathak of Kethuri, Kedareshwar Chakraborty of Merkachar, Ananta Kumar De of Angrapara, and Prasanna Mohan Chakraborty of Tatarkhil were broken.

=== Communal propaganda ===
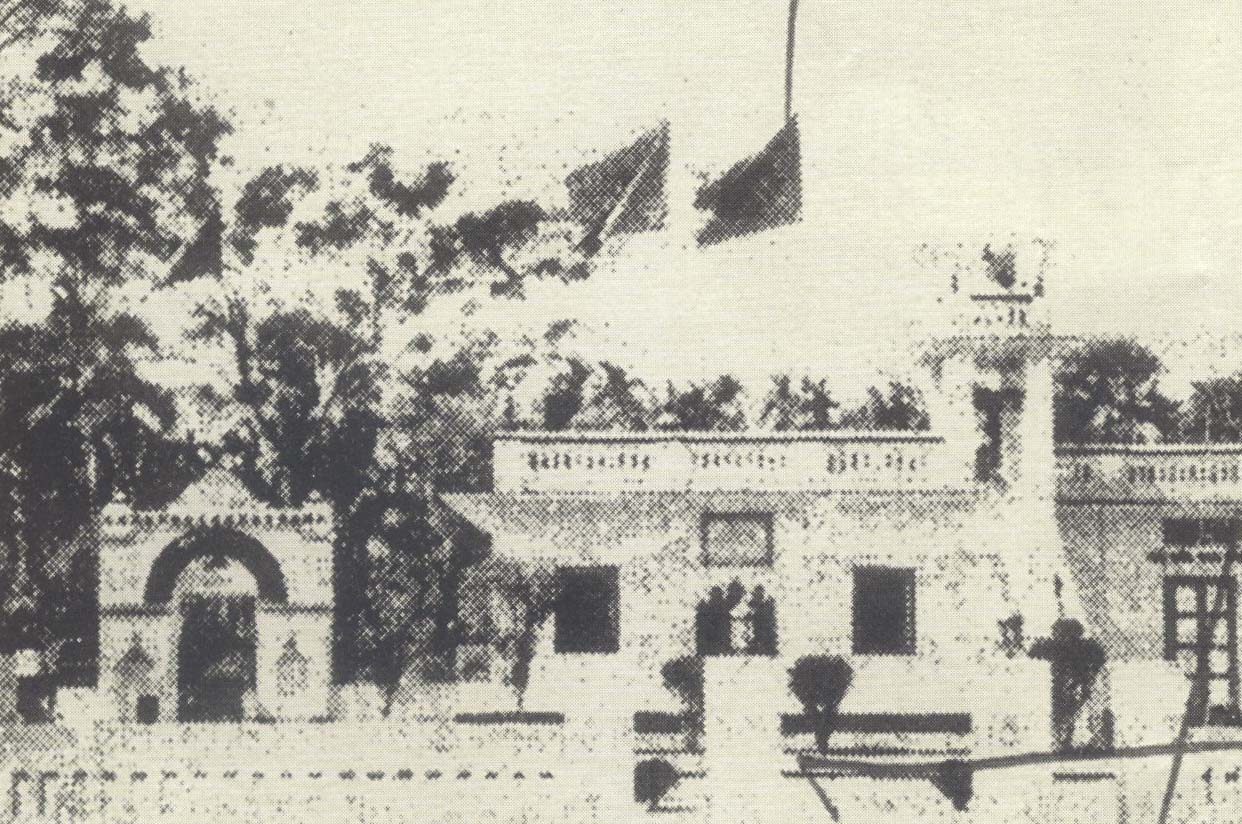
The Dayra Sharif of Shyampur, the residence of Ghulam Sarwar Hussaini.

In 1937, Ghulam Sarwar Hussaini, a member of a Muslim Pir family, was elected to the Bengal Legislative Assembly on a Krishak Praja Party ticket. However, in the 1946 elections, he lost to a Muslim League candidate. Hussaini's father and grandfather were pious Muslims. Their family served as the hereditary khadims (caretakers) at the Diara Sharif in Shyampur, a site revered by both Muslims and Hindus. After the Direct Action Day riots in Kolkata, Hussaini began delivering provocative speeches, inciting the Muslim masses to seek revenge for the Kolkata riots. In some places, Hindu shops were boycotted. In the Ramganj and Begumganj police station areas, Muslim boatmen refused to ferry Hindu passengers. In the first week of September, Muslims looted Hindu shops in Sahapur market. Hindus were harassed and molested as they returned to their native villages from Kolkata to spend the puja holidays. From 2 October onwards, there were frequent instances of killings, theft, and looting.

== Events ==
According to Governor Burrows, "the immediate occasion for the outbreak of the disturbances was the looting of a Bazar [market] in Ramganj police station following the holding of a mass meeting and a provocative speech by Ghulam Sarwar Hussaini." That included attacks on the place of business of Surendra Nath Bose and Rajendralal Roy Choudhury, the former president of the Noakhali Bar and a prominent Hindu Mahasabha leader.

=== Violence ===
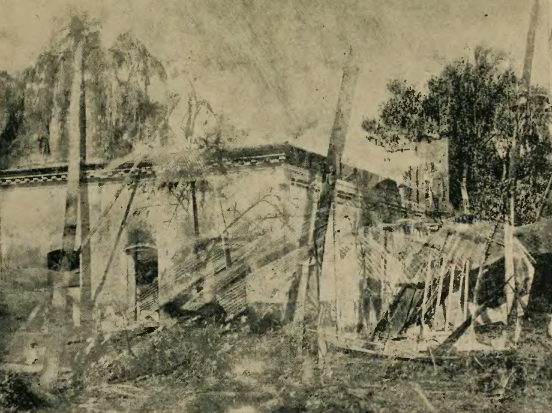
The destroyed house of Rajendralal Roychowdhury

The riots started on 10 October, the day of Kojagari Lakshmi Puja, when the Bengali Hindus were involved in puja activities. Ghulam Sarwar instructed the Muslim masses to march towards the Sahapur market. Another Muslim League leader, Kasem, also arrived at the Sahapur market with his private army, then known as the Kasemer Fauz. (Note: Kasemer Fauz literally means Kasem's army.)

On 11 October, the private army of Gholam Sarwar, known as the Miyar Fauz, attacked the residence of Rajendralal Roychowdhury, the president of the Noakhali Bar Association and the Noakhali District Hindu Mahasabha. At that time of attack, Swami Tryambakananda of Bharat Sevashram Sangha was staying at their house as a guest. Roychowdhury fended off the mob from his terrace with his rifle for the entire day. At nightfall, when they retreated, he sent the swami and his family members to safety. The next day the mob attacked again. Rajendralal Roychowdhury's severed head was presented to Ghulam Sarwar Hussaini on a platter. According to Sucheta Kriplani, Rajendralal Roychowdhury had followed in the footsteps of Shivaji and Guru Gobind Singh and became a martyr, defending his faith and family honour. He reportedly refused to leave his family home to the Islamists. Acharya Kripalani, a staunch believer in non-violence, held that the resistance offered by Rajendralal Roychowdhury and his family was the nearest approach to non-violence.

==== Nandigram ====
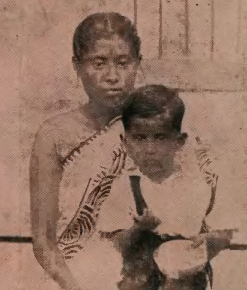
Surabala Majumdar, the wife of Dr. Pratap Chandra Majumdar, who was killed

Hindus from areas near Nandigram had taken shelter in the residence of Ramanikanta Nag. Initially the police protected them, repulsing the first attacks. The attackers then resorted to indiscriminate looting in the village. On 13 October, at 12 noon, a mob of 200 to 250 Muslims armed with deadly weapons attacked the Hindus in Changirgaon. 1,500 Maunds of paddy was burnt, and all the temples were destroyed. Hindu women were stripped of their shankha (Note: Shankha (Bengali: শাঁখা) is a bangle made of conch shell, traditionally worn by married Bengali Hindu women as a mark of their married life.) and sindur. The men were forced to perform the namaz.

==== Ramganj police station ====
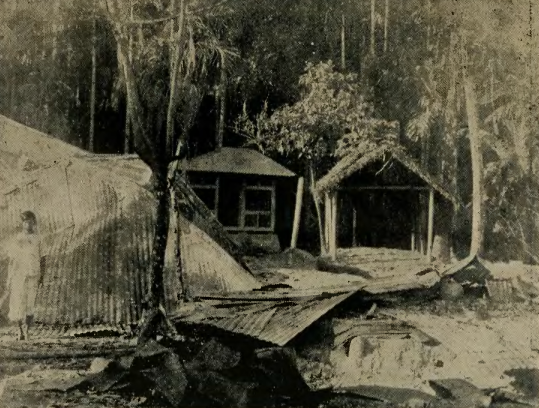
A destroyed homestead in Chandpur

On 14 October, Jogendra Chandra Das, the M.L.A. from Chandpur, Tipperah, wrote to Jogendra Nath Mandal stating that thousands of Scheduled Caste Hindus had been attacked in Ramganj police station area in Noakhali. Their houses were being looted and set on fire with petrol, and they were being forcibly converted to Islam.

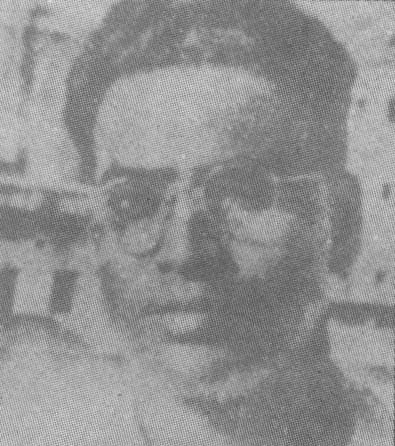
Freedom fighter Lalmohan Sen was killed by a Muslim mob.

In the remote island of Sandwip, which had no motor cars, petrol was imported from the mainland to set the houses on fire. According to Rakesh Batabyal, the use of petrol and kerosene indicates the premeditated and organised nature of the attacks. In Sandwip, revolutionary freedom fighter Lalmohan Sen was killed when he tried to resist a Muslim mob from killing Hindus.

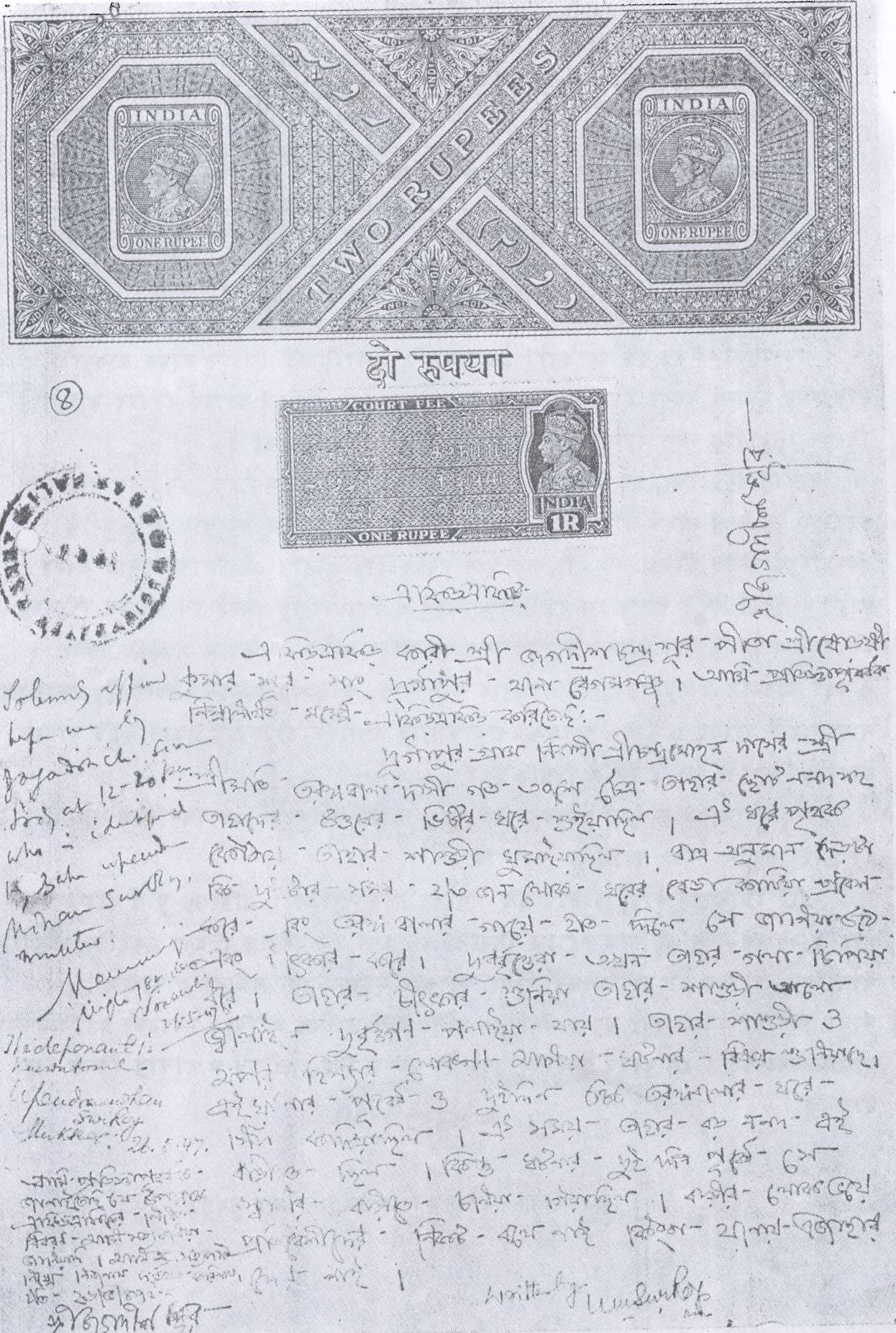
An affidavit attesting to atrocities on Hindu women

Violence broke out in the Ramganj police station area, in the north of Noakhali District, on 10 October 1946. The violence unleashed was described as "the organised fury of the Muslim mob". It soon engulfed the neighbouring police stations of Raipur, Lakshmipur, Begumganj, and Sandip in Noakhali, and Faridganj, Hajiganj, Chandpur, Lakshman, and Chudagram in Tippera. As per Gandhian Ashoka Gupta's report, at least 2000 Hindus had been forced to change their religion to Islam, six were forced to marry by force, and one person was murdered. However, the official estimate was 200.

=== Forcible conversions ===
When the news of the killings and forced conversions appeared in the news for the first time, Star of India, a newspaper patronised by the Muslim League, denied any incidents of forcible conversion. However, Huseyn Shaheed Suhrawardy, while answering a question from Dhirendranath Datta in the assembly, stated that there had been 9,895 cases of forcible conversion in Tipperah. The exact figure was not known for Noakhali, but it ran into thousands. Edward Skinner Simpson stated in his report that 22,550 cases of forcible conversion took place in the three police station areas of Faridganj, Chandpur, and Hajiganj in the district of Tipperah. Dr. Taj-ul-Islam Hashmi concluded that the number of Hindu women raped or converted was probably many times the number of Hindus killed. According to Justice G. D. Khosla, the entire Hindu population of Noakhali were robbed of all they possessed and then forcibly converted to Islam.

=== Official developments ===
On 13 October, Kamini Kumar Dutta, the leader of the Indian National Congress in the Bengal Legislative Council, paid a visit of inquiry to Noakhali in his personal capacity, during which he interviewed Abdullah, the District Superintendent of Police. On 15 October, he met the Minister of Civil Supplies of the Government of Bengal, who was on his way to Noakhali. On his return he communicated with the Home Department of the interim government, seeking effective remedial measures and stating that it was impossible for anyone from outside to enter the disturbed areas without risking his or her life. He further stated that the authorities were anxious to hush up the entire episode from public inspection. No force had been sent to the disturbed areas until 14 October.

Huseyn Shaheed Suhrawardy, the prime minister of Bengal, held a press conference in Kolkata on 16 October at which he acknowledged the forcible conversion, plunder, and looting of Hindus in Noakhali. While insisting that the incidents had stopped, he said he had no idea why the incidents had occurred. He stated that it had become difficult for troops to move in because the canals had been jammed, bridges were damaged, and roads blocked. He contemplated dropping printed appeals and warnings from the air instead of rushing in troops. On 18 October, Frederick Burrows, the governor of Bengal, along with Suhrawardy and the Inspector General of Police for Bengal, visited Feni by plane and flew over the affected areas. Later, the Government of Bengal sent an official team to Noakhali and Tipperah to assess the situation. The team consisted of Jogendra Nath Mandal, the newly appointed Member-in-Charge of Law in the Interim Government; Shamsuddin Ahmed, the Minister of Labour in the Bengal Government; Abul Hashim, the Secretary of Bengal Provincial Muslim League; Fazlur Rahman; Hamidul Huq Choudhury; Moazzem Hossain; A. Malik; and B. Wahiduzzaman.

On 19 October, Jivatram Bhagwandas Kripalani, the president-elect of the Indian National Congress; Sarat Chandra Bose, the Member-in-Charge of Works, Mines and Power in the Interim Government; Surendra Mohan Ghosh, the president of the Bengal Provincial Congress Committee; Sucheta Kripalani; Major General A. C. Chatterjee; Kumar Debendra Lal Khan; and the editor of Anandabazar Patrika flew to Chittagong at the suggestion of Mahatma Gandhi. On the way they made a brief stop at Comilla, to which thousands of refugees had fled. In Chittagong, they met Frederick Burrows, the governor of Bengal, who assured them that, according to Suhrawardy, the prime minister of Bengal, everything was again peaceful and orderly.

On 21 October, Arthur Henderson, the Under-Secretary of State for India and Burma, read a report from the governor of Bengal in the House of Commons that stated that the number of casualties was expected to be in the three-figure range. Sarat Chandra Bose challenged the statement, saying that 400 Hindus had been killed in a single incident at the office and residence of landlord Surendranath Bose.

On 25 October, at a mass meeting in New Delhi presided over by Suresh Chandra Majumdar, the managing director of the Anandabazar Patrika and the Hindusthan Standard, a resolution was passed demanding the immediate recall of the governor of Bengal, the dismissal of the Muslim League ministry, and intervention of the centre. At a press conference in Kolkata on 26 October, Lieutenant General F. R. R. Bucher, the GoC of Eastern Command, stated that it was impossible to estimate how long it would take to restore the confidence of the affected people in the government.

== Relief operations ==
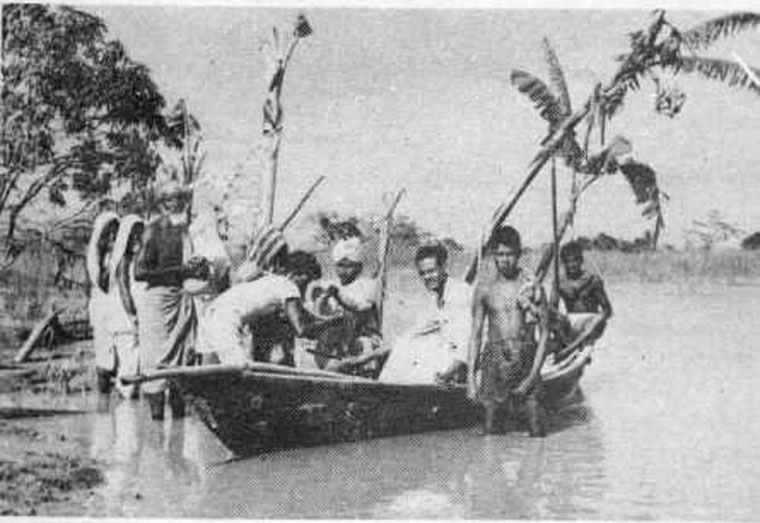
Swami Abhayananda of Bharat Sevashram Sangha distributing relief at Dalalbazar under the Lakshmipur police station in Noakhali in 1946.

When the news of the events in Noakhali reached the outside world, Indian social, religious, and political institutions came forward for relief and rescue operations. Notable among them were the Bharat Sevashram Sangha, Hindu Mahasabha, the Indian National Congress, the Communist Party of India, the Indian National Army, Prabartak Sangha, Abhay Ashram, Arya Samaj, and Gita Press. Thirty relief organisations and six medical missions participated in the relief work in Noakhali. Additionally, there were 20 camps under Gandhi's "one village, one worker" plan.

On receiving the news of Noakhali, Ashutosh Lahiry, the general secretary of the Hindu Mahasabha, immediately left for Chandpur. Syama Prasad Mookerjee, Nirmal Chandra Chatterjee, and Pandit Narendranath Das, along with other workers, flew to Comilla and entered the affected area with military escorts. A plane was requisitioned and dispatched to the area with supplies such as rice, chira, bread, milk, biscuits, barley, and medicines. Other consignments of relief supplies were dispatched by train. The affected people who took refuge in Kolkata were given protection in about 60 centers in the city and suburbs. Syama Prasad Mookerjee appointed M/S. P. K. Mitter & Co., a Kolkata-based accountancy firm, to control the collection, disbursement, and audit of funds contributed by the public.

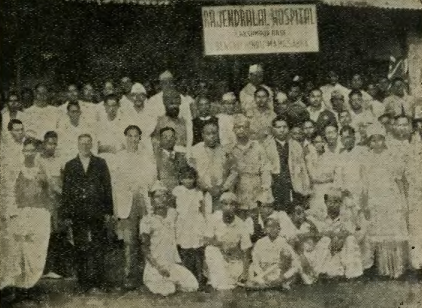
Inauguration of Rajendralal Hospital at Lakshmipur.

Nirmal Chandra Chatterjee, the acting president of the Bengal Provincial Hindu Mahasabha; Debendranath Mukherjee, the general secretary; and Nagendranath Bose, the assistant secretary, proceeded to the affected areas of Noakhali and Tipperah. Chatterjee consulted Larkin, the Relief Commissioner, and determined that zonal settlement was the best method for providing relief and safety, considering the future resettlement of victims in their respective villages. Accordingly, relief centers were opened at Bamni under the Raipur police station, Dalalbazar under the Lakshmipur police station, and Paikpara under the Faridganj police station. M. L. Biswas, the secretary of the Bengal Provincial Hindu Mahasabha; P. Bardhan, the medical secretary; and J. N. Banerjee, the treasurer, were sent to other affected areas to set up additional relief centers. Each of these centers was equipped with a mobile medical unit staffed by medical officers. Sanat Kumar Roy Chowdhury, the vice-president of the Bengal Provincial Hindu Mahasabha, inaugurated a well-equipped 25-bed hospital in Lakshmipur in memory of Rajendralal Raychaudhuri. Dr. Subodh Mitra was placed in charge of the hospital. Nirmal Chandra Chatterjee visited Noakhali for the third time and inaugurated a students' home at Bajapati named 'Shyamaprasad Chhatrabas'.

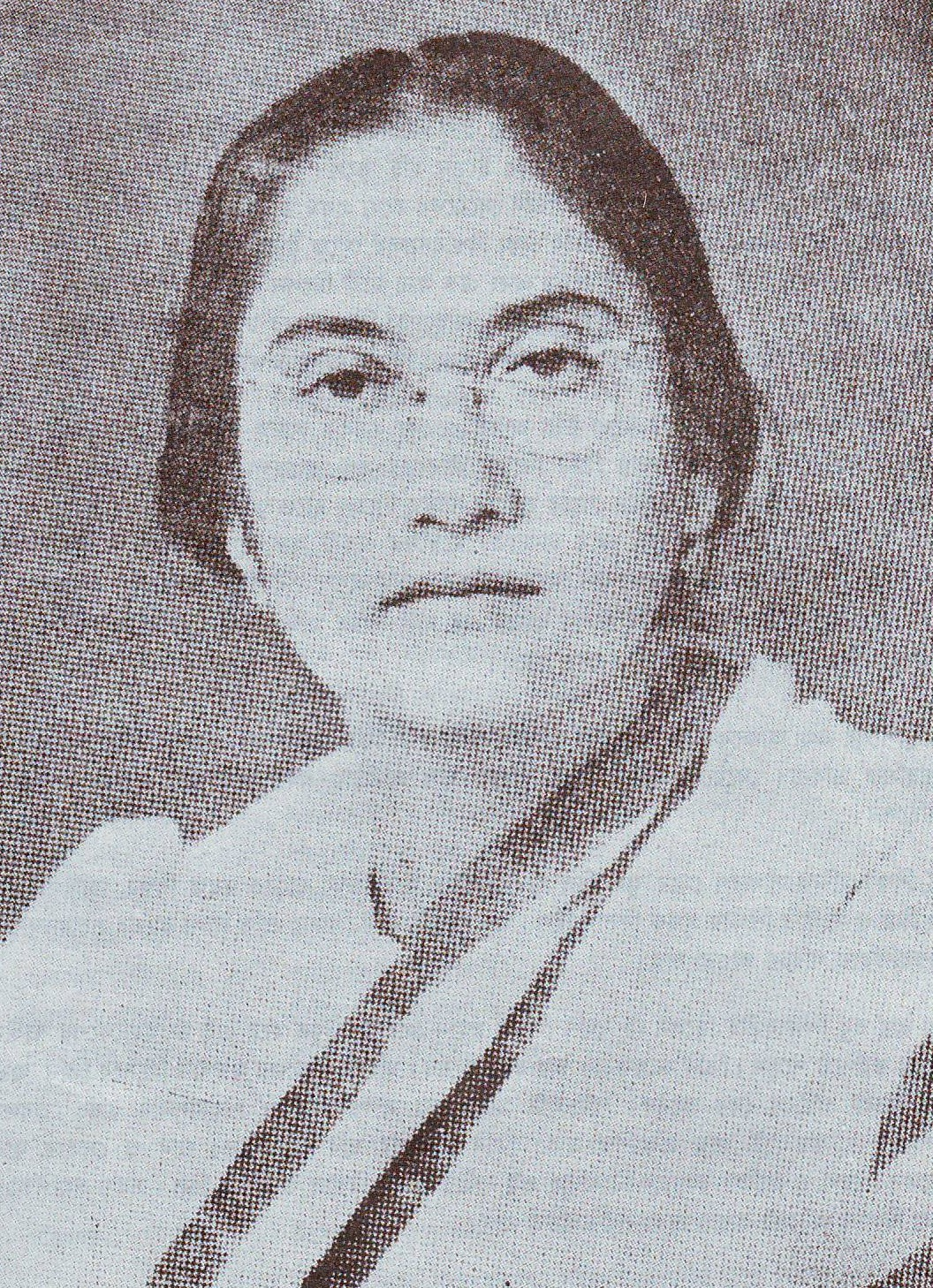
Leela Roy rescued 1,307 Hindu girls.

=== Women's relief and recovery ===
On 20 October 1946, at a meeting of the Chittagong Mahila Sangha, the Chittagong branch of the All India Women's Conference, presided over by Nellie Sengupta, a resolution was passed to prioritize the relief and recovery of abducted Hindu women during the Noakhali riots. The Noakhali Relief Committee was subsequently formed to provide rehabilitation to these women.

Beginning on 26 October, groups of volunteers led by Ashoka Gupta made weekly trips to Noakhali, where they assisted in locating abducted women, providing relief to refugees at railway stations, and compiling lists of affected villages based on survivors' testimonies. Leela Roy led a significant rescue mission, walking 90 miles from Chaumohani to Ramganj on 9 December 1946. She and her team successfully rescued 1,307 girls who had been abducted during the riots. Roy's organisation, the National Services Institute, also established 17 relief camps in the affected region. In December, the Srihatta Mahila Sangha dispatched additional volunteers, including Kiranshashi Deb, Leela Dasgupta, Saralabala Deb, and Suhasini Das, to assist with the ongoing relief work. Several Congress leaders, including Satish Chandra Dasgupta, Dhirendranath Dutta, Trailokya Chakrabarti, and Bishwaranjan Sen, played leading roles in coordinating relief efforts.

Mahatma Gandhi himself was involved in the relief of abducted women. He sent four rescued Hindu girls to Sujata Devi, the daughter-in-law of Chittaranjan Das, for rehabilitation. Sujata Devi established the Bangiya Pallee Sangathan Samity, which provided rehabilitation services and operated a free school to educate the rescued girls.

=== Government relief measures ===
The government of Bengal appointed a special relief commissioner with magisterial powers to oversee the distribution of funds to refugees. A government order dated 10 February 1947 announced a relief grant of Rs 250 to each affected household for rebuilding, and an additional Rs 200 was promised to each affected weaver, fisherman, and peasant to buy new tools, such as looms, ox carts, or fishing equipment, upon furnishing proof of loss. Relief workers criticised the government's decision to treat an entire joint family as a single unit, contending that Rs 250 was insufficient for rebuilding a homestead. On 11 February 1947, Ashoka Gupta met Akhtaruzzaman, the Additional District Magistrate of Noakhali, on behalf of the relief workers and obtained clarification on the order to ensure that no families were excluded from receiving aid.

=== Gandhi peace mission ===
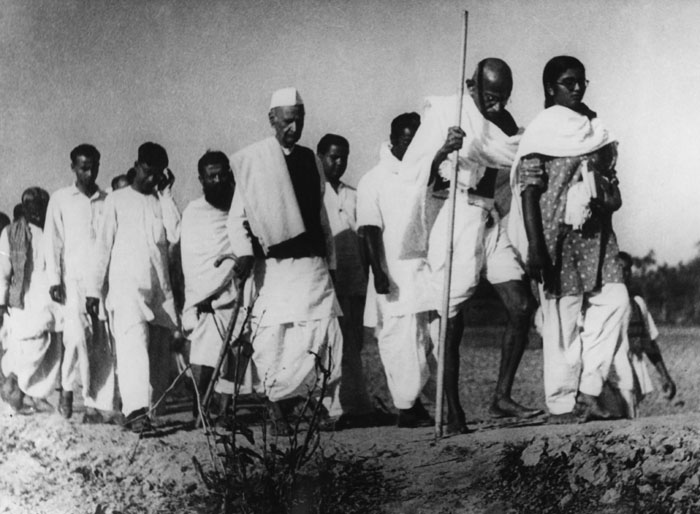
Gandhi in Noakhali, 1946

Gandhi played a role in cooling down the situation. He toured the area with his aides, and was mostly telling Hindus not to retaliate with violence. On 18 October, Bidhan Chandra Roy personally communicated with Gandhi, apprising him of the massacre of Hindus in Noakhali and the plight of the Hindu women in particular. At the evening prayer, Gandhi mentioned the events in Noakhali with concern. He said, if one-half of India's humanity was paralyzed, India could never really feel free. He would far rather see India's women trained to wield arms than that they should feel helpless. On 19 October, he decided to visit Noakhali. Before leaving, he was interviewed on 6 November by Dr. Amiya Chakravarty at the Abhay Ashram in Sodepur, near Kolkata. After the interview, Amiya Chakravarty said that the most urgent need of the hour was to rescue the abducted Hindu women, who obviously could not be approached by the military because, after being forcefully converted, they were kept under the veil.

Gandhi started for Noakhali on 6 November and reached Chaumuhani the next day. After spending two nights at the residence of Jogendra Majumdar, on 9 November he embarked on his tour of Noakhali, barefoot. In the next seven weeks, he covered 116 miles and visited 47 villages. He set up his base in a half-burnt house in the village of Srirampur, where he stayed until 1 January. He organised prayer meetings, met local Muslim leaders, and tried to win their confidence. Mistrust between Hindus and Muslims continued to exist, and stray incidents of violence occurred even during his stay in Noakhali. On the evening of 10 November, two persons were reported to have been murdered while returning home after attending Gandhi's evening prayer at Duttapara relief camp.

Gandhi's stay in Noakhali was resented by the Muslim leadership. In January 1947, in his talks with villagers of Fatehpur, Gandhi asked, "It is the easiest thing to harass the Hindus here, as you Muslims are in the majority. But is it just as honourable?" On 12 February 1947, while addressing a rally at Comilla, A. K. Fazlul Huq said that Gandhi's presence in Noakhali had harmed Islam enormously. He further wondered how the Muslims of Noakhali and Tipperah could stand Gandhi's presence so long. The resentment against Gandhi's stay in Noakhali grew day by day. Towards the end of February 1947, it became vulgar. Gandhi's route was deliberately dirtied every day, and Muslims began to boycott his meetings.

== Refugees ==
Survivors fled Noakhali and Tipperah in two distinct phases. The first batches of refugees arrived in Kolkata after the massacres and forced conversions. The refugee flow subsided when the government announced relief measures and the relief organisations started working in Noakhali and Tipperah. However, in March 1947, when the Congress agreed to the Partition of India, the relief camps were abandoned, and a fresh refugee influx took place in Tripura, Assam, and the region that was to become West Bengal. Around 50,000 Hindu refugees who were sheltered in temporary relief camps were subsequently relocated to Guwahati in Assam.

== Aftermath ==
According to historian Rakesh Batabyal, the situation never returned to normal. Sporadic incidents of violence continued, and even the police were not spared. In one incident in early November, reported by Frederick Burrows to Frederick Pethick-Lawrence, a senior ICS officer and his police party were attacked three times while escorting Hindu survivors to a refugee camp. The police had to open fire; seven people were killed and ten wounded. The Bengali periodical Desher Vani, published in Noakhali, quoted a relief worker in the Ramganj police station area who stated that even after four months, people had not returned to their houses. The expectation of some Bengali Hindu refugees to return to Noakhali declined when the East Pakistani government seized the lands owned by those who fled through the East Bengal State Acquisitions and Tenancy Act of 1950.

=== Investigation ===
On 29 September 1946, the Government of Bengal passed an ordinance prohibiting the press from publishing information regarding any communal disturbances. Any statement, advertisement, notice, news, or opinion piece was prohibited from mentioning: the name of the place where the incident occurred; the way in which the victims were killed or injured; the name of the community to which the victim or the perpetrator belonged; and the destruction or desecration of places of worship or shrines, if any. According to Ramesh Chandra Majumdar, the promulgation of the ordinance was the main reason that news of the incidents was not published in the press for a week.

The Government of Bengal appointed Edward Skinner Simpson, a retired judge, to investigate the incidents in Noakhali. His report was covered up by the government. After arriving at Calcutta (now Kolkata), on his way to Noakhali, Gandhi sought a copy of the report from Prime Minister Suhrawardy. The latter had initially agreed to provide him with a copy. However, the governor and the secretaries strongly objected to such a proposition, and Suhrawardy declined to hand over the report to Gandhi. A copy of the report was with Mathur, the secretary to Suhrawardy, who secretly provided a summary to The Statesman. The editor published a censored version on 13 November 1946. In the report, Simpson mentioned that for a proper investigation into the happenings in Noakhali, at least 50 senior officers would need to be engaged for a period of six months.

=== Noakhali on the eve of Partition ===
Although the massacres and mass conversions had stopped in October, persecution of the Hindu population continued in Noakhali, even during Gandhi's stay there. A week after Gandhi's departure from Noakhali, A. V. Thakkar wrote from Chandpur on 9 March before leaving for Mumbai that lawlessness was still persisting in Noakhali and Tipperah. Even five months after the riots in October, there was no sign of it stopping. On the contrary, the withdrawal of some of the temporary police stations was encouraging the criminal elements. On 19 March 1947, the Muslims held secret meetings in various places. They threatened the Hindus with mass slaughter. Ghulam Sarwar convened a huge meeting at Sonapur under the Ramganj police station on 23 March. The day was to be celebrated as Pakistan Day, and the day's programme was a general strike. Thousands of Muslims would gather at the meeting, which had been announced in the village markets on 20 March by the beating of the drums. At the announcement of the meeting, the Hindus began to flee, fearing further oppression. The Choumohani railway station was packed with Hindu refugees.

Relief workers from the Gandhi peace mission requested the district superintendent of police, the additional district magistrate, and Abdul Gofran, a minister, not to allow the meeting to be held. The DSP, however, stated that the meeting would be held and the police would adopt adequate security measures. The relief workers reported the matter to Gandhi and Suhrawardy, and the latter wired a government order to the Noakhali SP on 22 March prohibiting meetings in public places, processions, and slogans. However, meetings could be held in private places like madrasas and mosques. Rehan Ali, the officer-in-charge of the Ramganj police station, said that the meeting would be held at the Amtali ground, which was a private place as it was adjacent to a mosque, and therefore the government order would not be violated. The Muslim League leadership resolved to hold the meeting at any cost. Muslim League leaders Mohammad Ershad and Mujibur Rahman enlisted minister Abdul Gofran as one of the speakers at the meeting. On 23 March, 4,000 to 5,000 Muslims marched in a procession from Ramganj to Kazirkhil and then back to Ramganj, chanting slogans, and gathered for the meeting. Addressing the gathering, one of the speakers, Yunus Mian Pandit, criticised the Hindus for the practice of untouchability and lack of a purdah system and justified an economic boycott on them.

On 13 May 1947, William Barret, the Divisional Commissioner of the Chittagong Division, submitted a top secret report to P. D. Martyn, the additional secretary to the Department of Home, government of Bengal, detailing the persecution of the Hindus. He reported that groups of Muslims sometimes searched Hindus and took belongings that caught their fancy. In some cases, the Hindus had their daily shopping snatched away. Coconuts and betel nuts were forcefully taken from Hindu homesteads. Cattle were stolen. Corrugated iron sheets and timber were taken. Paddy plants were uprooted from Hindu-owned land. Efforts were made to close down Hindu-owned cinemas. Demands were made that the Muslims should have 50% of the loom licenses, although the vast majority of weavers were Hindus belonging to the Yogi caste. Efforts were made to rid the marketplaces of Hindu merchants and shopkeepers. Hindus who had rebuilt their homes were told to leave the district. Hindu complainants at the police station were threatened by Muslims and compelled to agree to their cases being compromised. Hindus were openly addressed as malauns and kafirs. It was reported on 13 May that a Hindu woman of Dharmapur village had been rescued while being abducted by Muslims. On 16 May, abduction was unsuccessfully attempted on two Hindu women.

== Repercussions in Bihar and United Provinces ==
As a reaction to the Noakhali riots, riots rocked Bihar towards the end of 1946. Severe violence broke out in Chhapra and Saran district between 25 and 28 October. Patna, Munger, and Bhagalpur also became the sites of serious turbulence. "According to a subsequent statement in the British Parliament, the death toll amounted to 5,000. The Statesman's estimate was between 7,500 and 10,000; the Congress party admitted to 2,000; Mr. Jinnah [the head of the Muslim League] claimed about 30000." However, by 3 November, the official estimate put the number of deaths at only 445.

Writing in 1950, Francis Tuker, who at the time of the violence was General Officer Commanding-in-Chief, Eastern Command, India, estimated the Muslim death toll to be between 7,000 and 8,000. Severe rioting also took place in Garhmukteshwar in United Provinces, where a massacre occurred in November 1946 in which "Hindu pilgrims, at the annual religious fair, set upon and exterminated Muslims, not only on the festival grounds but in the adjacent town" while the police did little or nothing; the deaths were estimated at between 1,000 and 2,000.

== See also ==
- Communal violence in India
- 1946 Calcutta Killings
- Anti-Hinduism
- Hinduism in Bangladesh
