= Direct Action Day =

1946 sectarian violence in British India

Direct Action Day Great Calcutta Killings
- Part of the Partition of India
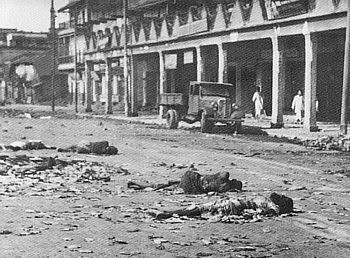
- Dead and wounded after the Direct Action Day which developed into pitched battles as Muslim and Hindu mobs rioted across Calcutta in 1946, the year before independence
- Date: 16 August 1946
- Location: Calcutta, Bengal, British India; 22.58°N 88.36°E
- Caused by: Perceived unfairness and discrimination, misinformation
- Goals: Partition of India
- Methods: General strike, rioting, assaults and arson
- Result: Partition of Bengal

Parties
Hindus	Muslims

Lead figures
No centralised leadership, though local Indian National Congress leaders took part	Local chapter of All-India Muslim League

Casualties
- Deaths: 4,000 – 10,000 (Hindus & Muslims)

Direct Action Day (16 August 1946) was the day the All-India Muslim League decided to take a "direct action" using general strikes and economic shut down to demand a separate Muslim homeland after the British exit from India. Also known as the 1946 Calcutta Riots and Great Calcutta Killings, it soon became a day of communal violence in Calcutta. It led to large-scale violence between Muslims and Hindus in the city of Calcutta (now known as Kolkata) in the Bengal province of British India. The day also marked the start of what is known as The Week of the Long Knives. While there is a certain degree of consensus on the magnitude of the killings (although no precise casualty figures are available), including their short-term consequences, controversy remains regarding the exact sequence of events, the various actors' responsibility and the long-term political consequences.

There is still extensive controversy regarding the respective responsibilities of the two main communities, the Hindus and the Muslims, in addition to individual leaders' roles in the carnage. The dominant British view—as reflected in the memoirs of Lieutenant-General Sir Francis Tuker—tends to blame both communities equally and to emphasize the calculations of the leaders and the savagery of the followers, among whom there were criminal elements. In the Indian National Congress' version of the events, the blame tends to be laid squarely on the Muslim League and in particular on the Chief Minister of Bengal, Huseyn Shaheed Suhrawardy. Thus, the riots opened the way to a partition of Bengal between a Hindu-dominated Western Bengal including Calcutta and a Muslim-dominated Eastern Bengal (now Bangladesh).

The All-India Muslim League and the Indian National Congress were the two largest political parties in the Constituent Assembly of India in the 1940s. The Muslim League had demanded since its 1940 Lahore Resolution for the Muslim-majority areas of India in the northwest and the east to be constituted as 'independent states'. The 1946 Cabinet Mission to India for planning of the transfer of power from the British Raj to the Indian leadership proposed a three-tier structure: a centre, groups of provinces and provinces. The "groups of provinces" were meant to accommodate the Muslim League's demand. Both the Muslim League and the Congress in principle accepted the Cabinet Mission's plan. However; Nehru's speech on 10 July 1946 rejected the idea that the provinces would be obliged to join a group and stated that the Congress was neither bound nor committed to the plan. In effect, Nehru's speech squashed the mission's plan and the chance to keep India united. Jinnah interpreted the speech as another instance of treachery by the Congress. With Nehru's speech on groupings, the Muslim League rescinded its previous approval of the plan on 29 July.

Consequently, in July 1946, the Muslim League withdrew its agreement to the plan and announced a general strike (hartal) on 16 August, terming it Direct Action Day, to assert its demand for a separate homeland for Muslims in certain northwestern and eastern provinces in colonial India. Calling for Direct Action Day, Muhammad Ali Jinnah, the leader of the All India Muslim League, said that he saw only two possibilities "either a divided India or a destroyed India".

Against a backdrop of communal tension, the protest triggered massive riots in Calcutta. More than 4,000 people died and 100,000 residents were left homeless in Calcutta within 72 hours. The violence sparked off further religious riots in the surrounding regions of Noakhali, Bihar, United Provinces (modern day Uttar Pradesh), Punjab (including massacres in Rawalpindi) and the North Western Frontier Province. The events sowed the seeds for the eventual Partition of India.

== Background ==
In 1946, the Indian independence movement against the British Raj had reached a pivotal stage. British Prime Minister Clement Attlee sent a three-member Cabinet Mission to India aimed at discussing and finalising plans for the transfer of power from the British Raj to the Indian leadership. After holding talks with the representatives of the Indian National Congress and the All India Muslim League—the two largest political parties in the Constituent Assembly of India—on 16 May 1946, the Mission proposed a plan of composition of the new Dominion of India and its government. The Muslim League demand for 'autonomous and sovereign' states in the northwest and the east was accommodated by creating a new tier of 'groups of provinces' between the provincial layer and the central government. The central government was expected to handle the subjects of defence, external affairs and communications. All other powers would be relegated to the 'groups'.

Muhammad Ali Jinnah, the leader of the Muslim League, had accepted the Cabinet Mission Plan of 16 June, as had the central presidium of Congress. On 10 July, however, Jawaharlal Nehru, the Congress President, held a press conference in Bombay declaring that although the Congress had agreed to participate in the Constituent Assembly, it reserved the right to modify the Cabinet Mission Plan as it saw fit. Fearing Hindu domination in the central government, the Muslim League politicians pressed Jinnah to revert to "his earlier unbending stance". Jinnah rejected the British Cabinet Mission plan for transfer of power to an interim government which would combine both the Muslim League and the Indian National Congress, and decided to boycott the Constituent Assembly. In July 1946, Jinnah held a press conference at his home in Bombay. He proclaimed that the Muslim League was "preparing to launch a struggle" and that they "have chalked out a plan". He said that if the Muslims were not granted a separate Pakistan then they would launch "direct action". When asked to be specific, Jinnah retorted: "Go to the Congress and ask them their plans. When they take you into their confidence I will take you into mine. Why do you expect me alone to sit with folded hands? I also am going to make trouble."

The next day, Jinnah announced 16 August 1946 would be "Direct Action Day" and warned Congress, "We do not want war. If you want war we accept your offer unhesitatingly. We will either have a divided India or a destroyed India." The Muslim League had thus said "goodbye to Constitutional methods" and was ready to "create trouble".

In his book The Great Divide, H V Hodson recounted, "The Working Committee followed up by calling on Muslims throughout India to observe 16th August as 'Direct Action Day'. On that day, meetings would be held all over the country to explain the League's resolution. These meetings and processions passed off—as was manifestly the central League leaders' intention—without more than commonplace and limited disturbances, with one vast and tragic exception ... What happened was more than anyone could have foreseen."

In Muslim Societies: Historical and Comparative Aspects, edited by Sato Tsugitaka, Nakazato Nariaki writes:

From the viewpoint of institutional politics, the Calcutta disturbances possessed a distinguishing feature in that they broke out in a transitional period which was marked by the power vacuum and systemic breakdown. It is also important to note that they constituted part of a political struggle in which the Congress and the Muslim League competed with each other for the initiative in establishing the new nation-state(s), while the British made an all-out attempt to carry out decolonization at the lowest possible political cost for them. The political rivalry among the major nationalist parties in Bengal took a form different from that in New Delhi, mainly because of the broad mass base those organizations enjoyed and the tradition of flexible political dealing in which they excelled. At the initial stage of the riots, the Congress and the Muslim League appeared to be confident that they could draw on this tradition even if a difficult situation arose out of political showdown. Most probably, Direct Action Day in Calcutta was planned to be a large-scale hartal and mass rally (which is an accepted part of political culture in Calcutta) which they knew very well how to control. However, the response from the masses far exceeded any expectations. The political leaders seriously miscalculated the strong emotional response that the word 'nation', as interpreted under the new situation, had evoked. In August 1946 the 'nation' was no longer a mere political slogan. It was rapidly turning into 'reality' both in realpolitik and in people's imaginations. The system to which Bengal political leaders had grown accustomed for decades could not cope with this dynamic change. As we have seen, it quickly and easily broke down on the first day of the disturbances.

== Prelude ==
Since the 11–14 February 1946 riots in Calcutta, communal tension had been high. Hindu and Muslim newspapers whipped up public sentiment with inflammatory and highly partisan reporting that heightened antagonism between the two communities. Adding further fuel to inflamed Muslim communal sentiments was a pamphlet written by the Mayor of Calcutta, Syed Mohammed Usman, where he said, "We Muslims have had the crown and have ruled. Do not lose hearts, be ready and take swords. Oh kafir! Your doom is not far".

Following Jinnah's declaration of 16 August as the Direct Action Day, acting on the advice of the-then Chief Secretary of Bengal Ronald Leslie Walker, the Muslim League's Chief Minister of Bengal, Huseyn Shaheed Suhrawardy, requested the governor of Bengal Sir Frederick Burrows to declare a public holiday on that day, to which Burrows agreed. Walker made this proposal with the hope that the risk of conflicts, especially those related to picketing, would be minimised if government offices, commercial houses and shops remained closed throughout Calcutta on 16 August. The Bengal Congress protested against the declaration of a public holiday, arguing that a holiday would enable 'the idle folks' to successfully enforce hartals in areas where the Muslim League leadership was not so powerful. Congress accused the League government of "having indulged in 'communal politics' for a narrow goal". Congress leaders thought that if a public holiday was observed, its own supporters would have no choice but to close down their offices and shops, and thus be compelled against their will to lend a hand in the Muslim League's hartal.

On 14 August, Kiran Shankar Roy, the leader of the Congress Party in the Bengal Legislative Assembly, called on Hindu shopkeepers to not observe the public holiday, and keep their businesses open in defiance of the hartal.

The Star of India, an influential local Muslim newspaper, edited by Raghib Ahsan, the Muslim League MLA from Calcutta published the detailed program for the day. The program called for complete a hartal and general strike in all spheres of civic, commercial and industrial life except essential services. The notice proclaimed that processions would start from multiple parts of Calcutta, Howrah, Hooghly, Metiabruz and 24 Parganas, and would converge at the foot of the Ochterlony Monument (now known as Shaheed Minar) where a joint mass rally presided over by Huseyn Shaheed Suhrawardy would be held. The Muslim League branches were advised to depute three workers in every mosque in every ward to explain the League's action plan before Juma prayers. Moreover, special prayers were arranged in every mosque on Friday after Juma prayers for the freedom of Muslim India. The notice drew divine inspiration from the Quran, emphasising on the coincidence of Direct Action Day with the holy month of Ramzaan, claiming that the upcoming protests were an allegory of Prophet Muhammad's conflict with heathenism and subsequent conquest of Mecca and establishment of the Kingdom of Heaven in Arabia.

Hindu public opinion was mobilised around the Akhand Hindusthan (United India) slogan. Certain Congress leaders in Bengal imbibed a strong sense of Hindu identity, especially in view of the perceived threat from the possibility of marginalising themselves into minority against the onslaught of the Pakistan movement. Such mobilisation along communal lines was partly successful due to a concerted propaganda campaign which resulted in a 'legitimisation of communal solidarities'. In response to anti-British protests during the Indian National Army trials, the colonial administration implemented the "Emergency Action Scheme", which placed a higher emphasis on monitoring and countering such protests than managing communal violence among Indians. Burrows defended his decision to accept the declaration of a "public holiday" in a report to Lord Wavell. Suhrawardy repeatedly pressured reluctant British officials to call in troops stationed at Sealdah to restore order; the first units arrived on the scenes of the violence at 1:45 a.m. on 17 August.

Many of the mischief-makers were people who would have had idle hands anyhow. If shops and markets had been generally open, I believe that there would have been even more looting and murder than there was; the holiday gave the peaceable citizens the chance of staying at home.

— Frederick Burrows, Burrows' Report to Lord Wavell.

== Riots and massacre ==
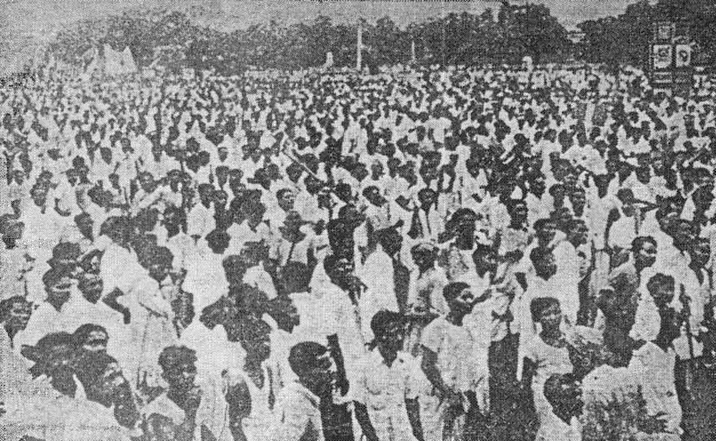
The crowd at the Muslim League rally at the Maidan.

Troubles started on the morning of 16 August. Even before 10 o'clock the Police Headquarters at Lalbazar had reported that there was excitement throughout the city, that shops were being forced to close, and that there were many reports of brawls, stabbing and throwing of stones and brickbats. These were mainly concentrated in the North-central parts of the city like Rajabazar, Kelabagan, College Street, Harrison Road, Colootola and Burrabazar. Several of these areas had also been rocked by communal riots in December 1910. In these areas the Hindus were in a majority and were also in a superior and powerful economic position. The trouble had assumed the communal character which it was to retain throughout.

The meeting began around 2 pm though processions of Muslims from all parts of Calcutta had started assembling since the midday prayers. A large number of the participants were reported to have been armed with iron bars and lathis (bamboo sticks). The numbers attending were estimated by a Central Intelligence Officer's reporter at 30,000 and by a Special Branch Inspector of Calcutta Police at 500,000. A Star of India reporter put it at about 100,000. The main speakers were Khawaja Nazimuddin and Chief Minister Suhrawardy. Nazimuddin in his speech preached peacefulness and restraint but then flared up the tensions by stating that until 11 o'clock that morning all the injured persons were Muslims, and the Muslim community had only retaliated in self-defence. Suhrawardy, in his speech, appeared to indirectly promise that no action would be taken against armed Muslims.

The Special Branch of Calcutta Police had sent only one shorthand reporter to the meeting, with the result that no transcript of the Chief Minister's speech is available. But the Central Intelligence Officer and a reporter, whom Frederick Burrows believed was reliable, deputed by the military authorities agree on one statement. The version in the former's report was—"He [the Chief Minister] had seen to police and military arrangements who would not interfere". The version of the latter's was—"He had been able to restrain the military and the police". However, the police did not receive any specific order to "hold back". So, whatever Suhrawardy may have meant to convey by this, the impression of such a statement on a largely uneducated audience is construed by some to be an open invitation to disorder. Many of the listeners are reported to have started attacking Hindus and looting Hindu shops as soon as they left the meeting. Subsequently, there were reports of lorries (trucks) that came down Harrison Road in Calcutta, carrying hardline Muslim gangsters armed with brickbats and bottles as weapons and attacking Hindu-owned shops.

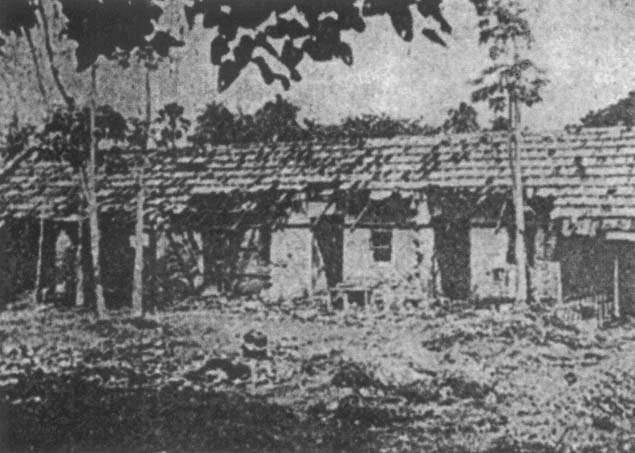
More than 300 Oriya labourers of Kesoram Cotton Mills were massacred in the slums of Lichubagan, Metiabruz.

A 6 pm curfew was imposed in the parts of the city where there had been rioting. At 8 pm forces were deployed to secure main routes and conduct patrols from those arteries, thereby freeing up police for work in the slums and the other underdeveloped sections.

Syed Abdullah Farooqui, President of Garden Reach Textile Workers' Union, led a radical mob to kill Hindu mill workers in the compound of Kesoram Cotton Mills in the Lichubagan area of Metiabruz. The death toll of labourers residing in the mills, among whom were a substantial number of Odias, was reported to be between 7,000 and 10,000. Some suggest most of the victims were Muslims, and other authors claim that Hindu casualties surpassed the former. On 25 August, four survivors lodged a complaint at the Metiabruz police station against Farooqui. Bishwanath Das, a Minister in the Government of Orissa, visited Lichubagan to investigate into the killings of the mill labourers. Many authors claim Hindus were the primary victims.

The worst of the killing took place during the day on 17 August. By late afternoon, soldiers brought the worst areas under control and the military expanded its hold overnight. In the slums and other areas, however, which were still outside military control, lawlessness and rioting escalated hourly. In the morning of 18 August, "Buses and taxis were charging about loaded with Sikhs and Hindus armed with swords, iron bars and firearms."

Skirmishes between the communities continued for almost a week. Finally, on 21 August, Bengal was put under the rule of the Viceroy. Five battalions of British troops, supported by 4 battalions of Indians and Gurkhas, were deployed in the city. Lord Wavell stated that more troops ought to have been called in earlier, and there is no indication that more British troops were not available. The rioting reduced on 22 August.

== Characteristics of the riot and demographics in 1946 ==
Violence in Calcutta, between 1945 and 1946, passed by stages from Indian versus European to Hindu versus Muslim. Indian Christians and Europeans were generally free from molestation as the tempo of Hindu-Muslim violence quickened. The decline of anti-European feelings as communal Hindu-Muslim tensions increased during this period is evident from the casualty numbers. During the riots of November 1945, casualty of Europeans and Christians were 46; in the riots of the 10–14 February 1946, 35; from 15 February to 15 August, only three; during the Calcutta riots from 15 August 1946 to 17 September 1946, none.

Religions in Calcutta in 1946
1. Hinduism (73.0%)
2. Islam (23.0%)
3. Others (4.00%)

Calcutta had 2,952,142 Hindus, 1,099,562 Muslims, and 12,852 Sikhs in 1946, the year before partition. After independence, the Muslim population came down to 601,817 due to the migration of 500,000 Muslims from Calcutta to East Pakistan after the riot. The 1951 Census of India recorded that 27% of Calcutta's population was East Bengali refugees, mainly Hindu Bengalis. Millions of Bengali Hindus from East Pakistan had taken refuge mainly in the city and a number of estimations shows that around 320,000 Hindus from East Pakistan had migrated to Calcutta alone between 1946–50.

The first census after partition shows that in Calcutta from 1941 to 1951 the number of Hindus increased while the number of Muslims decreased; the Hindu percentage increased from 73% in 1941 to 84% in 1951, while the Muslim percentage declined from 23% in 1941 to 12% in 1951 census. In the 2011 census, Kolkata had a Hindu majority of 76.51%. Muslims stood at 20.6%, and the Sikh population stood at 0.31%.

== Aftermath ==
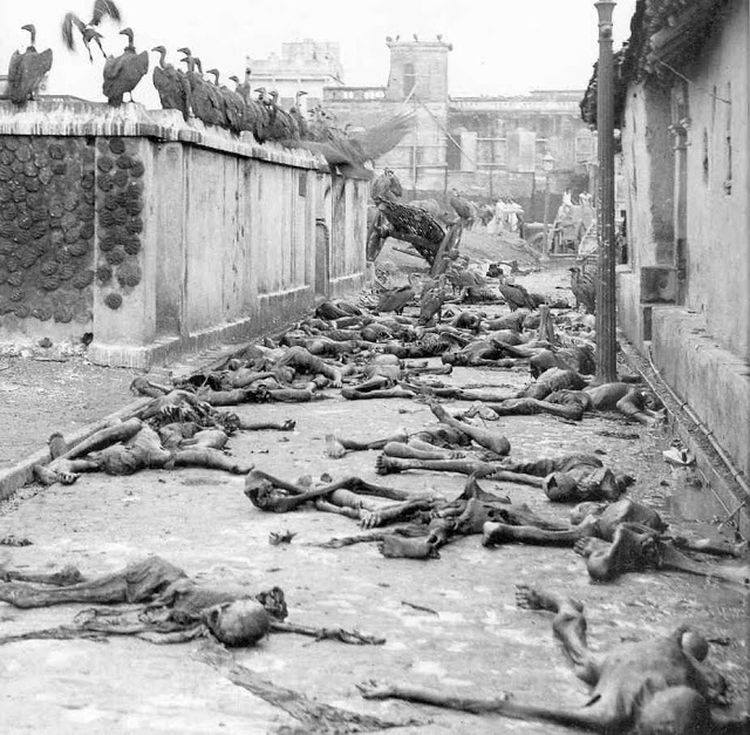
Corpses litter the narrow streets of Calcutta after four days of rioting in August 1946, as vultures feed on the remains.

During the riots, thousands began fleeing Calcutta. For several days the Howrah Bridge over the Hooghly River was crowded with evacuees headed for the Howrah station to escape the mayhem in Calcutta. Many of them would not escape the violence that spread out into the region outside Calcutta. Lord Wavell claimed during his meeting on 27 August 1946 about the possibility of a civil war that Mahatma Gandhi had slammed his fist on the table and told him, "If India wants bloodbath she shall have it ... if a bloodbath was necessary, it would come about in spite of non-violence".

Soon after the Calcutta killings, Nehru and his sister met people who seemed bewildered, with some blaming politicians for shattering years of peace. Nehru, horrified by the events, observed: "Murder stalks the street and the most amazing cruelties are indulged in by both the individuals and the mob. Riot is not the word for it – it is just the sadistic desire to kill."

There was criticism of Suhrawardy, Chief Minister in charge of the Home Portfolio in Calcutta, for being partisan and of Sir Frederick John Burrows, the British Governor of Bengal, for not having taken control of the situation. The Chief Minister spent a great deal of time in the Control Room in the Police Headquarters at Lalbazar, often attended by some of his supporters. Short of a direct order from the Governor, there was no way of preventing the Chief Minister from visiting the Control Room whenever he liked; and Governor Burrows was not prepared to give such an order, as it would clearly have indicated a complete lack of faith in him. Prominent Muslim League leaders spent a great deal of time in police control rooms directing operations and the role of Suhrawardy in obstructing police duties is documented. It was also reported Suhrawardy had sacked Hindu policemen on 16 August. Both the British and Congress blamed Jinnah for calling the Direct Action Day and held the Muslim League responsible for stirring up the Muslim nationalist sentiment.

There are several views on the exact cause of the Direct Action Day riots. The Hindu press blamed the Suhrawardy Government and the Muslim League. According to the authorities, riots were instigated by members of the Muslim League and its affiliate Volunteer Corps, in the city in order to enforce the declaration by the Muslim League that Muslims were to 'suspend all business' to support their demand for an independent Pakistan.

However, supporters of the Muslim League claimed the Congress Party was behind the violence in an effort to weaken the fragile Muslim League government in Bengal. Historian Joya Chatterji allocates much of the responsibility to Suhrawardy, for setting up the confrontation and failing to stop the rioting, but points out that Hindu leaders were also culpable. Members of the Indian National Congress, including Mohandas Gandhi and Jawaharlal Nehru responded negatively to the riots and expressed shock. The riots would lead to further rioting and pogroms between Hindus, Sikhs and Muslims.

=== Further rioting in India ===
The Direct Action Day riots sparked off several riots between Muslims and Hindus/Sikhs in Noakhali, Bihar, and Punjab in that year:

==== Noakhali riots ====
An important sequel to Direct Action Day was the massacre in Noakhali and Tipperah districts in October 1946. News of the Great Calcutta Riot touched off the Noakhali–Tipperah riot in reaction. However, the violence was different in nature from Calcutta.

Rioting in the districts began on 10 October 1946 in the area of northern Noakhali district under Ramganj police station. The violence unleashed was described as "the organized fury of the Muslim mob". It soon engulfed the neighbouring police stations of Raipur, Lakshmipur, Begumganj and Sandwip in Noakhali, and Faridganj, Hajiganj, Chandpur, Laksham and Chudagram in Tipperah. The disruption caused by the widespread violence was extensive, making it difficult to accurately establish the number of casualties. Official estimates put the number of dead between 200 and 300. According to Francis Tuker, who at the time of the disturbances was General Officer Commanding-in-Chief, Eastern Command, India, the Hindu press intentionally and grossly exaggerated reports of disorder. The neutral and widely accepted death toll figure is around 5000.

According to Governor Burrows, "the immediate occasion for the outbreak of the disturbances was the looting of a Bazar [market] in Ramganj police station following the holding of a mass meeting." This included attacks on the place of business of Surendra Nath Bose and Rajendra Lal Roy Choudhury, the erstwhile president of the Noakhali Bar and a prominent Hindu Mahasabha leader.

Mahatma Gandhi camped in Noakhali for four months and toured the district in a mission to restore peace and communal harmony. In the meantime, the Congress leadership started to accept the proposed Partition of India and the peace mission and other relief camps were abandoned. The majority of the survivors migrated to West Bengal, Tripura and Assam.

==== Bihar and rest of India ====
A devastating riot rocked Bihar towards the end of 1946. Between 30 October and 7 November, a large-scale massacre in Bihar brought the Partition closer to inevitability. Severe violence broke out in Chhapra and Saran district, between 25 and 28 October. Patna, Munger, and Bhagalpur quickly became sites of serious violence. Begun as a reprisal for the Noakhali riot, whose death toll had been greatly overstated in immediate reports, it was difficult for authorities to deal with because it was spread out over a large area of scattered villages, and the number of casualties was impossible to establish accurately: "According to a subsequent statement in the British Parliament, the death-toll amounted to 5,000. The Statesman's estimate was between 7,500 and 10,000; the Congress party admitted to 2,000; Jinnah claimed about 30,000." However, by 3 November, the official estimate put the figure of death at only 445.

According to some independent sources, the death toll was around 8,000. Some of the worst rioting also took place in Garhmukteshwar in the United Provinces where a massacre occurred in November 1946, in which "Hindu pilgrims, at the annual religious fair, set upon and exterminated Muslims, not only on the festival grounds but in the adjacent town" while the police did little or nothing. The deaths were estimated at between 1,000 and 2,000.

=== In popular culture ===
Released on 5th September, 2025, Director Vivek Agnihotri's film, The Bengal Files, picturises the events of Direct Action Day and the communal violence in Bengal. The film explores the tragedy of the Great Calcutta Killings and subsequent events like the Noakhali riots.

== See also ==
- Bengali Nationalism
- Tebhaga movement
- Noakhali riots
- Bangladesh genocide
- Bengal Renaissance
- Partition of Bengal
- List of massacres in India
- Opposition to the partition of India

== Bibliography ==
- Bourke-White, Margaret (1949). Halfway to Freedom: A Report on the New India in the Words and Photographs of Margaret Bourke-White. New York: Simon and Schuster. OCLC 10065226.
- Hardy, Peter (1972). The Muslims of British India. Cambridge University Press. ISBN 0-521-08488-1.
- Jalal, Ayesha (1994) [first published 1985]. The Sole Spokesman: Jinnah, the Muslim League and the Demand for Pakistan. Cambridge University Press. ISBN 978-0-521-45850-4.
- Kulke, Hermann; Rothermund, Dietmar (2004) [First published 1986]. A History of India (4th ed.). Routledge. ISBN 978-0-415-32919-4.
- Metcalf, Barbara D. A; Metcalf, Thomas R. (2006) [First published 2001]. A Concise History of Modern India (PDF) (2nd ed.). Cambridge University Press. ISBN 978-0-521-86362-9.
- Talbot, Ian; Singh, Gurharpal (2009). The Partition of India. Cambridge University Press. ISBN 978-0-521-85661-4.
- Tsugitaka, Sato, ed. (2004). Muslim Societies: Historical and Comparative Aspects. New York: Routledge. pp. 112–. ISBN 978-0-203-40108-8.
- Wolpert, Stanley (2009) [First published 1977]. A New History of India (8th ed.). Oxford University Press. ISBN 978-0-19-516677-4.
