= Constituent Assembly of India =

Unicameral assembly for making the Constitution of India

- Seal of the Constituent Assembly

Type
- Type: Unicameral

History
- Founded: 6 December 1946
- Disbanded: 25 January 1950
- Preceded by: Imperial Legislative Council
- Succeeded by: Provisional Parliament (1950–1952); Constituent Assembly of Pakistan (1947–1956)

Leadership
- First President: Sachchidananda Sinha
- President (Permanent): Dr. Rajendra Prasad
- Vice President: H. C. Mookerjee; V. T. Krishnamachari
- Constitutional Advisor: B. N. Rau
- Chairman of the Drafting Committee: B. R. Ambedkar

Structure
- Seats: 389 (December 1946 – June 1947); 299 (August 1947 – January 1950)
- Political groups: INC: 208 seats Others (inc. CPI, ABHM, JP, SAD, Independent etc.): 15 seats Princely States: 93 seats AIML: 73 seats (until August 1947)

Elections
- Voting system: Single transferable vote
- Last election: July 1946

Meeting place
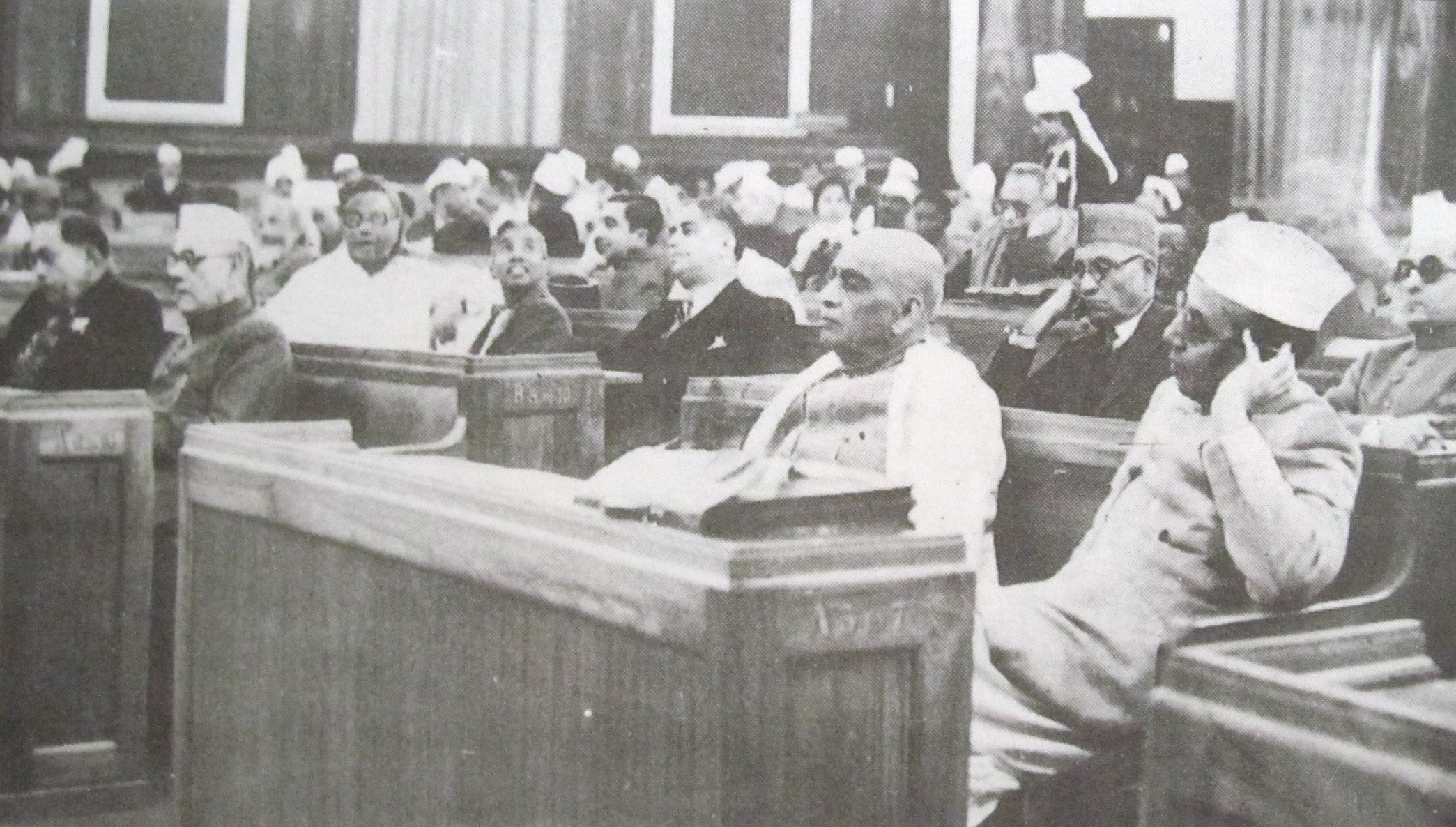
- Old Parliament House, Raisina Hill, New Delhi

The Constituent Assembly of India was the legislature of the Dominion of India from its independence in August 1947 until 1950, when India became a republic. Best known for its creation of the Indian constitution, its members were mostly elected from the provinces of British India—with a third being nominated by princely states.

First formed in December 1946 as an advisory body aimed at drafting a constitution for a united and independent India eighteen months before the original June 1948 deadline for independence, it was given sovereign powers to legislate for the Dominion of India (excluding princely states that refused to accede to the Dominion) following partition and independence on 15 August 1947 and the abolition of the Imperial Legislative Council under the provisions of the Indian Independence Act 1947.

Its members continued as part of the provisional unicameral Parliament of India from the adoption of the Indian constitution in 1950 until the first bicameral Parliament convened following elections in May 1952.

== Description of the constituent assembly ==
The Constituent Assembly of India, consisting of indirectly elected representatives, was established to draft a constitution for India (including the now-separate countries of Pakistan and Bangladesh). It existed for approximately three years, the first legislature (Dominion Legislature) of India after independence in 1947. The Assembly was not elected based on complete universal adult suffrage, and Muslims and Sikhs received special representation as minorities. The Muslim League boycotted the Assembly, although 28 of its members out of 73 ended up joining India's Constituent Assembly. A large part of the Constituent Assembly was drawn from the Indian National Congress Party (69%), and included a wide diversity of ideologies and opinions—from conservatives and progressives to Marxists, liberals, and Hindu revivalists. In his classic history of the Indian Constitution, the historian Granville Austin describes the Constituent Assembly as "India in microcosm." Austin shows that although the Constituent Assembly was a one-party body in an essentially one-party country, it was representative of India and the "Indian Constitution expresses the will of the many rather than the needs of the few."

Further, as Achyut Chetan has shown in his book Founding Mothers of the Indian Republic, the women members of the Constituent Assembly "formed a distinct group in that august body, spoke in a distinct feminist parlance, and shared a constitutional vision of justice to such an extent that they can collectively be called the ‘mothers’ of the Indian Constitution." Female members were initially Begum Aizaz Rasul, Begum Jahanara Shahnawaz, Begum Shaista Suhrawardy Ikramullah, Ammu Swaminathan, Dakshayani Velayaudhan, G. Durgabai, Sucheta Kripalani, Vijayalakshmi Pandit, Purnima Banerji, Kamala Chaudhri, Sarojini Naidu, Hansa Mehta, Rajkumari Amrit Kaur, Leela Roy, and Malati Choudhury. Renuka Ray and Annie Mascarene were later elected as well, and by 1948 the assembly had 17 female members.

The Assembly met for the first time in New Delhi on 9 December 1946, and its last session was held on 24 January 1950. The hope of the Assembly was expressed by Jawaharlal Nehru:

The first task of this Assembly is to free India through a new constitution, to feed the starving people, and to clothe the naked masses, and to give every Indian the fullest opportunity to develop himself according to his capacity. This is certainly a great task. Look at India today. We, are sitting here and there in despair in many places, and unrest in many cities. The atmosphere is surcharged with these quarrels and feuds which are called communal disturbances, and unfortunately we sometimes cannot avoid them. But at present the greatest and most important question in India is how to solve the problem of the poor and the starving. Wherever we turn, we are confronted with this problem. If we cannot solve this problem soon, all our constitutions will become useless and purposeless. Keeping this aspect in view, who could suggest to us to postpone and wait?

— Jawaharlal Nehru, Constituent Assembly Debates (Proceedings), Vol. II

== Background and election ==
The Indian National Congress held its session at Lucknow in April 1936 presided by Jawaharlal Nehru. The official demand for a Constituent Assembly was raised and the Government of India Act 1935 was rejected as it was an imposition on the people of India. C. Rajagopalachari again voiced the demand for a Constituent Assembly on 15 November 1939 based on adult franchise, and was accepted by the British in August 1940.

On 8 August 1940, a statement was made by Viceroy Lord Linlithgow about the expansion of the Governor-General's Executive Council and the establishment of a War Advisory Council. This offer, known as the August Offer, included giving full weight to minority opinions and allowing Indians to draft their own constitution. Under the Cabinet Mission Plan of 1946, elections were held for the first time for the Constituent Assembly. The Constitution of India was drafted by the Constituent Assembly, and it was implemented under the Cabinet Mission Plan on 16 May 1946. The members of the Constituent Assembly of India were elected by the provincial assemblies by a single transferable vote system of proportional representation. The total membership of the Constituent Assembly was 389 of which 292 were representatives of the provinces, 93 represented the princely states and four were from the chief commissioner provinces of Delhi, Ajmer-Merwara, Coorg and British Baluchistan.

Unlike previous elections under British Raj where voting was restricted by property and educational qualifications, the elections of 1946, which would further elect representatives to the Assembly, saw the voting franchise extended to a much greater portion of the Indian adult population.

The elections for the 296 seats assigned to the British Indian provinces were completed by August 1946. The Indian National Congress won 208 seats (69%), and the Muslim League 73. After this election, the Muslim League refused to cooperate with the Congress and the political situation deteriorated. Hindu-Muslim riots began, and the Muslim League demanded a separate constituent assembly for Muslims in India. On 3 June 1947 Lord Mountbatten, the last British Governor-General of India, announced his intention to scrap the Cabinet Mission Plan; this culminated in the Indian Independence Act 1947 and the separate nations of India and Pakistan. The Indian Independence Act 1947 was passed on 18 July 1947 and, although it was earlier declared that India would become independent in June 1948, this event led to independence on 15 August 1947. The Constituent Assembly met for the first time on 9 December 1946, reassembling on 14 August 1947 as a sovereign body and successor to the British parliament's authority in India.

As a result of the partition, under the Mountbatten plan, a separate Constituent Assembly of Pakistan was established on 3 June 1947. The representatives of the areas incorporated into Pakistan ceased to be members of the Constituent Assembly of India. New elections were held for the West Punjab and East Bengal (which became part of Pakistan, although East Bengal later seceded to become Bangladesh); the membership of the Constituent Assembly of India was 299 after the reorganization, and it met on 31 December 1947. The constitution was drafted by 299 delegates from different castes, regions, religions, gender etc. These delegates sat over 114 days spread over 3 years (2 years 11 months and 18 days to be precise) and discussed what the constitution should contain and what laws should be included. The Drafting Committee of the Constitution was chaired by B. R. Ambedkar.

== Constitution and elections ==
At 11 am on 9 December 1946, the Assembly began its first session, with 207 members attending. The Assembly approved the draft constitution on 26 November 1949. On 26 January 1950, the constitution took effect (commemorated as Republic Day), and the Constituent Assembly became the Provisional Parliament of India (continuing until after the first elections under the new constitution in 1952). The members of the Constituent Assembly became the members of the Provisional Parliament from 1950 to 1952.

== Organisation ==
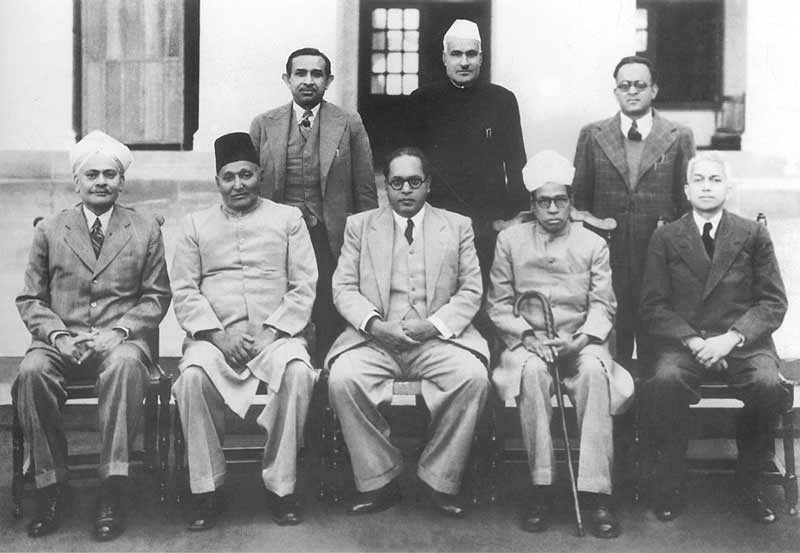
Ambedkar and other members of the Drafting Committee of the Indian Constitution on Aug. 29, 1947.

Rajendra Prasad was elected as the president and Harendra Coomar Mookerjee, a Christian from Bengal and former vice-chancellor of Calcutta University, was vice-president. Mookerjee, additionally to chairing the assembly's Minorities Committee, was appointed governor of West Bengal after India became a republic. Jurist B. N. Rau was appointed constitutional adviser to the assembly; Rau prepared the original draft of the constitution and was later appointed a judge in the Permanent Court of International Justice in The Hague.

The assembly's work had five stages:

- Committees presented reports on issues.
- B. N. Rau prepared an initial draft based on the reports and his research into the constitutions of other nations.
- The drafting committee, chaired by B. R. Ambedkar, presented a detailed draft constitution which was published for public discussion.
- The draft constitution was discussed, and amendments were proposed and enacted.
- The constitution was adopted, with a committee of experts led by the Congress Party (known as the Congress Assembly Party) played a pivotal role.

== Timeline of formation of the constitution of India ==
- 16 May 1946: The Cabinet Mission Plan lays down the composition and structure of the Constituent Assembly
- July 1946: Completion of elections to the Constituent Assembly; 296 members from British India (undivided) and 93 members from 20 independent Indian states elected.
- 11 July 1946: B N Rau appointed adviser to Constituent Assembly
- 9 December 1946: Formation of the Constituent Assembly (demanding a separate state, the Muslim League boycotted the meeting)
- 11 December 1946: President Appointed – ⁣Rajendra Prasad, vice-chairman Harendra Coomar Mookerjee and constitutional legal adviser B. N. Rau (initially 389 members in total, which declined to 299 after partition. Out of 389, 292 were from government provinces, 4 from chief commissioner provinces and 93 from princely states)
- 13 December 1946: An 'Objective Resolution' was presented by Jawaharlal Nehru, laying down the underlying principles of the constitution, which later became the Preamble of the constitution.
- 22 January 1947: Objective resolution unanimously adopted.
- 27 February 1947: First meeting of the Sub-Committee on Fundamental Rights. This sub-committee has 12 members of which two are women – Hansa Mehta and Amrit Kaur.
- 16 April 1947: Report of the Sub-Committee on Fundamental Rights submitted to the Advisory Committee
- 16–19 April 1947: The Sub-Committee on Minorities examines the Report on Fundamental Rights and gives its recommendations
- 21–22 April 1947: Vigorous debates in the Advisory Committee on the reports of the two sub-committees
- 23 April 1947: The Advisory Committee submits its report; directive principles not yet finalized
- 22 July 1947: National flag adopted.
- 15 August 1947: Achieved independence. British India split into Dominion of India and Dominion of Pakistan.
- 29 August 1947: Drafting Committee appointed, with Dr. B. R. Ambedkar as the chairman. Other 6 members of the committee were: K.M.Munshi, Muhammed Saadulah, Alladi Krishnaswamy Iyer, Gopala Swami Ayyangar, N. Madhava Rao (He replaced B.L. Mitter who resigned due to ill health), T. T. Krishnamachari (He replaced D.P. Khaitan who died in 1948).
- 16 July 1948: Along with Harendra Coomar Mookerjee, V. T. Krishnamachari was also elected as the second vice-president of the Constituent Assembly.
- 26 November 1949: 'Constitution of India' passed and adopted by the assembly.
- 24 January 1950: Last meeting of the Constituent Assembly. 'The Constitution of India' (with 395 articles, 8 schedules, 22 parts) was signed and accepted by all.
- 26 January 1950: The 'Constitution of India' came into force after 2 years, 11 months, and 18 Days, at a total expenditure of ₹64 lakhs (6.4 million) to finish.

== Committees of the Constituent Assembly ==
The Constituent Assembly appointed a total of 22 committees to deal with different tasks of constitution-making. Out of these, Eight were major committees and the others were minor committees.

Major Committees

1. Union Power Committee – Jawaharlal Nehru
2. Union Constitution Committee – Jawaharlal Nehru
3. States Committee (Committee for negotiating with states) – ⁣Jawaharlal Nehru
4. Provincial Constitution Committee – Vallabhbhai Patel
5. Drafting Committee – B. R. Ambedkar
6. Advisory Committee on Fundamental Rights, Minorities and Tribal and Excluded Areas – Vallabhbhai Patel. This committee had the following subcommittees:
  1. Fundamental Rights Sub-Committee – J. B. Kripalani
  2. Minorities Sub-Committee – Harendra Coomar Mookerjee,
  3. North-East Frontier Tribal Areas and Assam Excluded & Partially Excluded Areas Sub-Committee – Gopinath Bordoloi
  4. Excluded and Partially Excluded Areas (Apart from those in Assam) Sub-Committee – Thakkar Bapa
7. Rules of Procedure Committee – Rajendra Prasad
8. Steering Committee – Rajendra Prasad
9. Ad hoc Committee on the National Flag – Rajendra Prasad
10. Committee for the function of the Constitution Assembly – ⁣Ganesh Vasudev Mavalankar
11. House Committee – ⁣Bhogaraju Pattabhi Sitaramayya
12. Language Committee – ⁣Moturi Satyanarayana
13. Order of Business Committee – ⁣Kanaiyalal Maneklal Munshi

== Criticism ==
The constitution, has been in recent times, due political differences, criticised on the basis that the members of the Constituent Assembly were not completely chosen by universal suffrage, but rather were elected by provincial assemblies. In his book The Constitution of India: Miracle, Surrender, Hope, Rajeev Dhavan tried to argue that the Indian people did not have much say in the making of the Constitution, which they had no choice but to accept.

== Prominent members ==
- Rajendra Prasad, President of the Constituent Assembly
- Benegal Narsing Rau, The Constitutional Advisor
- Pt. Jawaharlal Nehru, Chairman of Union Powers committee, Chairman of Union Constitution Committee, Chairman of States Committee & Chairman of Special Committee to Examine the Draft Constitution (Constitution Assembly Committees), 1st Prime Minister of Independent India
- Vallabhbhai Patel, Chairman of Advisory Committee on Fundamental Rights, Minorities and Tribal and Excluded Areas(constitutional committee, The first Home Minister of India and the first Deputy Prime Minister of India
- Maulana Muhammad Syed Masoodi
- Bhimrao Ramji Ambedkar, Chairman of the Drafting Committee
- Sir N. Madhava Rao, Dewan of Mysore
- Deep Narayan Singh, Cabinet Minister of Bihar
- Gopinath Bordoloi, 1st Chief Minister of Assam
- Syama Prasad Mookerjee
- Muhammad Saadulla
- P. Subbarayan
- Kailash Nath Katju, 1st Governor of Odisha
- N. Gopalaswami Ayyangar
- Tiruvellore Thattai Krishnamachari
- Rameshwar Prasad Sinha
- Durgabai Deshmukh
- K. M. Munshi
- M. Mohammed Ismael, President of the Indian Union Muslim League
- Krishna Ballabh Sahay
- Frank Anthony, Anglo-Indian representative
- Sarvepalli Radhakrishnan, Vice President of India
- John Mathai, Minister of Railways
- Pratap Singh Kairon
- K. Kamaraj, Chief Minister of Tamil Nadu
- Chidambaram Subramaniam
- Jaipal Singh Munda, Former Indian Hockey captain, and Tribal leader
- Hargovind Pant
- Kala Venkata Rao, Freedom fighter, AICC general secretary, minister of Madras and later Andhra Pradesh
- Hifzur Rahman Seoharwi, Islamic scholar and an activist of the Indian independence movement.
- Ranbir Singh Hooda, Congress leader from Rohtak

== Members (by province/state) ==
Province	Members
Madras	O. V. Alagesan, Ammu Swaminathan, M. A. Ayyangar, Moturi Satyanarayana, Dakshayani Velayudhan, Durgabai Deshmukh, Kala Venkata Rao, N. Gopalaswami Ayyangar, D. Govinda Das, Jerome D'Souza, P. Kakkan, T. M. Kaliannan Gounder, K. Kamaraj, V. C. Kesava Rao, T. T. Krishnamachari, Alladi Krishnaswamy Iyer, L. Krishnaswami Bharathi, P. Kunhiraman, Mosalikanti Thirumala Rao, V. I. Munuswamy Pillai, M. A. Muthiah Chettiar, V. Nadimuthu Pillai, S. Nagappa, P. L. Narasimha Raju, Bhogaraju Pattabhi Sitaramayya, C. Perumalswamy Reddy, Tanguturi Prakasam, Stanley Henry Prater, Raja Swetachalapati, R. K. Shanmukham Chetty, T. A. Ramalingam Chettiar, Ramnath Goenka, O. P. Ramaswamy Reddiyar, N. G. Ranga, Neelam Sanjiva Reddy, Sheik Galib Sahib, K. Santhanam, B. Shiva Rao, Kallur Subba Rao, U. Srinivas Mallya, P. Subbarayan, Chidambaram Subramaniam, Vinnakota Jagannatha Gupta, V. Subramanian, M. C. Veerabahu Pillai, P. M. Velayudapan, A. K. Menon, T. J. M. Wilson, M. Muhammad Ismail, K. T. M. Ahmed Ibrahim, Mahboob Ali Baig Sahib Bahadur, B. Pocker, V. Ramaiah, R. S. Ramakrishna Ranga Rao, V Kodandarama Reddy,P. Ranga Reddy, D. Sanjeevaiyaa
Bombay	Balchandra Maheshwar Gupte, Hansa Mehta, Hari Vinayak Pataskar, Joseph Alban D'Souza, Kanayalal Nanabhai Desai, Keshavrao Jedhe, Khandubhai Kasanji Desai, B. G. Kher, Minoo Masani, Kanaiyalal Maneklal Munshi, Narhar Vishnu Gadgil, S. Nijalingappa, S. K. Patil, Ramchandra Manohar Nalavade, Ranganath Ramachandra Diwakar, Shankarrao Deo, Ganesh Vasudev Mavalankar, Vallabhbhai Patel, Abdul Kadar Mohammad Shaikh, Abdul Kadir Abdul Aziz Khan
Bengal	Mono Mohan Das, B. R. Ambedkar(Following partition, the seat was allocated to East Pakistan, and Dr. B. R. Ambedkar was elected from Bombay.),Arun Chandra Guha, Lakshmi Kanta Maitra, Mihir Lal Chattopadhyay, Satis Chandra Samanta, Suresh Chandra Majumdar, Upendranath Barman, Prabhudayal Himatsingka, Basanta Kumar Das, Renuka Ray, Harendra Coomar Mookerjee, Surendra Mohan Ghose, Shyama Prasad Mukherjee, Ari Bahadur Gurung, R. E. Platel, Kshitish Chandra Neogy, Raghib Ahsan, Somnath Lahiri, Jasimuddin Ahmad, Naziruddin Ahmad, Abdul Hamid, Abdul Halim Ghaznavi
United Provinces	Maulana Hifzur Rahman Seoharwi, Ajit Prasad Jain, Rai Bahadur Raghubir Narain Singh, Algu Rai Shastri, Bal Krishna Sharma Naveen, Banshi Dhar Misra, Bhagwan Din, Damodar Swarup Seth, Dayal Das Bhagat, Dharam Prakash, Dharam Dass, Raghunath Vinayak Dhulekar, Feroze Gandhi, Gopal Narain, Krishna Chandra Sharma, Govind Ballabh Pant, Govind Malaviya, Hargovind Pant, Harihar Nath Shastri, H. N. Kunzru, Jaspat Roy Kapoor, Jagannath Baksh Singh, Jawaharlal Nehru, Jogendra Singh, Jugal Kishore, Jwala Prasad Srivastava, B. V. Keskar, Kamla Chaudhry, Kamalapati Tripathi, J. B. Kripalani, Mahavir Tyagi, Khurshed Lal, Masuriya Din, Mohanlal Saksena, Padampat Singhania, Phool Singh, Paragi Lal, Purnima Banerjee, Purushottam Das Tandon, Hira Vallabh Tripathi, Ram Chandra Gupta, Shibban Lal Saxena, Satish Chandra, John Matthai, Sucheta Kripalani, Sunder Lal, Venkatesh Narayan Tiwari, Mohanlal Gautam, Vishwambhar Dayalu Tripathi, Vishnu Sharan Dublish, Begum Aizaz Rasul, Hyder Hussain, Hasrat Mohani, Maulana Azad, Nawab Mohammad Ismail Khan, Rafi Ahmed Kidwai, Zahirul Hasnain Lari, Chaudhry Khaliquzzaman
Punjab (Now East Punjab)	Bakshi Tek Chand, Diwan Chaman Lall, Jairamdas Daulatram, Thakur Das Bhargava, Bikramlal Sondhi, Yashwant Rai, Ranbir Singh Hooda, Lala Achint Ram, Nand Lal, Baldev Singh, Gurmukh Singh Musafir, Sardar Hukam Singh, Sardar Bhopinder Singh Mann, Sardar Rattan Singh Lohgarh, Partap Singh Kairon, Chaudhry Suraj Mal, Begum Aizaz Rasul
Bihar	Amiyo Kumar Ghosh, Anugrah Narayan Sinha, Banarsi Prasad Jhunjhunwala, Bhagwat Prasad, Boniface Lakra, Brajeshwar Prasad, Chandrika Ram, K. T. Shah, Devendra Nath Samanta, Dip Narain Sinha, Guptanath Singh, Jadubans Sahay, Jagat Narain Lal, Jagjivan Ram, Jaipal Singh Munda, Kameshwar Singh of Darbhanga, Kamaleshwari Prasad Yadav, Mahesh Prasad Sinha, Krishna Ballabh Sahay, Raghunandan Prasad, Rajendra Prasad, Rameshwar Prasad Sinha, Ramnarayan Singh, Sachchidananda Sinha, Sarangdhar Sinha, Satya Narayan Sinha, Binodanand Jha, Pranab K. Sen, Shri Krishna Sinha, Sri Narayan Mahtha, Shyam Nandan Prasad Mishra, Syed Hussain Imam, Syed Jaffer Imam, S. M. Latifur Rahman, Mohd Tahir Hussain, Tajamul Hussain, Choudhry Abid Hussain, Hargovind Mishra.
Central Provinces and Berar	Ambica Charan Shukla, Raghu Vira, Raj, Bhagwantrao Mandloi, Brajlal Biyani, Thakur Cheedilal, Seth Govind Das, Hari Singh Gour, Hari Vishnu Kamath, Hemchandra Jagobaji Khandekar, Ghanshyam Singh Gupta, Laxman Shrawan Bhatkar, Panjabrao Deshmukh, Ravishankar Shukla, R. K. Sidhva, Dada Dharmadhikari, Frank Anthony, Kazi Syed Karimuddin, Ganpatrao Dani
Assam	Nibaran Chandra Laskar, D. Basumatari, Gopinath Bordoloi, James Joy Mohan Nichols Roy, Kuladhar Chaliha, Rohini Kumar Chaudhuri, Muhammed Saadulah, Syed Abdur Rouf
Orissa	Bishwanath Das, Krushna Chandra Gajapati, Harekrushna Mahatab, Laxminarayan Sahu, Lokanath Mishra, Nandkishore Das, Rajkrishna Bose, Santanu Kumar Das
Delhi	Deshbandhu Gupta
Ajmer-Merwara	Mukat Behari Lal Bhargava
Coorg	C. M. Poonacha
Mysore	K. Chengalaraya Reddy, T. Siddalingayya, H. R. Guruv Reddy, S. V. Krishnamoorthy Rao, Kengal Hanumanthaiah, H. Siddhaveerappa, T. Channiah
Jammu and Kashmir	Sheikh Abdullah, Motiram Baigra, Mirza Afzal Beg, Maulana Masoodi
Travancore-Cochin	Pattom A. Thanu Pillai, R. Sankar, P. T. Chacko, Panampilly Govinda Menon, Annie Mascarene, P. S. Nataraja Pillai, K. A. Mohamed, P. K. Lekshmanan
Madhya Bharat	Vinayak Sitaram Sarwate, Brijraj Narain, Gopikrishna Vijayavargiya, Ram Sahai, Kusum Kant Jain, Radhavallabh Vijayvargiya, Sitaram Jajoo
Saurashtra	Balwantrai Mehta, Jaisukhlal Hathi, Thakkar Bapa, Chimanlal Chakubhai Shah, Samaldas Gandhi
Rajputana	V. T. Krishnamachari, Hiralal Shastri, Sardar Singhjhi of Khetri, Jaswant Singhji, Raj Bahadur, Manikya Lal Verma, Gokul Lal Asava, Ramchandra Upadhyaya, Balwant Singh Mehta, Dalel Singh, Jai Narayan Vyas
Patiala and East Punjab States Union	Ranjit Singh, Sochet Singh Aujla, Bhagwant Roy
Bombay States	Vinayakrao Balshankar Vaidya, B. N. Munavalli, Gokulbhai Bhatt, Jivraj Narayan Mehta, Gopaldas Ambaidas Desai, Paranlal Thakurlal Munshi, Balasaheb Hanumantrao Khardekar, Ratnappa Kumbhar
Orissa States	Lal Mohan Pati, N. Madhava Rao, Raj Kunwar, Sarangadhar Das, Yudhishthir Misra
Central Provinces States	Ratanlal Kishorilal Malviya, Kishori Mohan Tripathi, Thakur Ramprasad Potai
United Provinces States	Bashir Hussain Zaidi, Shri Krishna Sinha
Madras States	V. Ramaiah
Vindhya Pradesh	Awadhesh Pratap Singh, S. N. Shukla, Ram Sahai Tiwary, Manoolal Dwivedi
Cooch Behar	Himmat Singh K. Maheshwari
Tripura and Manipur	Girija Shankar Guha
Bhopal	Lal Singh
Kutch	Bhavanji Arjan Khimji
Himachal Pradesh	Yashwant Singh Parmar

=== Members who later withdrew after partition ===
Province	Members
Bengal (Now East Bengal)	Abdullah al Mahmood, Abdullah al-Baqi, Abdul Hamid, Abul Kashem Khan, Mohammad Akram Khan, Azizuddin Ahmad, Habibullah Bahar Chowdhury, Prem Hari Barma, Raj Kumar Chakraverty, Sris Chandra Chattopadhyaya, Abdul Matin Chaudhury, Murtaza Reza Chowdhury, Hamidul Huq Chowdhury, Akshay Kumar Das, Dhirendranath Datta, Bhupendra Kumar Datta, Ebrahim Khan, Fazlul Huq, Fazlur Rahman, Ghayasuddin Pathan, Shaista Suhrawardy Ikramullah, Liaquat Ali Khan, Mafizuddin Ahmad, Mahmud Husain, Jnanendra Chandra Majumdar, Abdul Motaleb Malik, Birat Chandra Mandal, Jogendra Nath Mandal, Mohammed Ali, Khwaja Nazimuddin, Nur Ahmed, Nurul Amin, Ishtiaq Hussain Qureshi, Dhananjoy Roy, Bhabesh Chandra Nandi, B.L. Serajul Islam, Shabbir Ahmad Usmani, Khwaja Shahabuddin, Huseyn Suhrawardy, Harendra Kumar Sur, Maulvi Tamizuddin Khan, Kamini Kumar Dutta, Ghulam Mohammed
Punjab (Now West Punjab)	Mumtaz Daultana, Ganga Saran, Zafarullah Khan, Iftikhar Hussain Khan Mamdot, Mian Iftikharuddin, Muhammad Ali Jinnah, Sheikh Karamat Ali, Nazir Ahmed Khan, Abdur Rab Nishtar, Firoz Khan Noon, Omar Hayat Malik, Jahanara Shahnawaz, Shaukat Hayat Khan,
Northwest Frontier	Abdul Ghaffar Khan, Sardar Bahadur Khan, Sardar Asad Ullah Jan Khan
Sind	Abdus Sattar Abdur Rahman, Alhajj Hashim Gazdar, Muhammad Ayub Khuhro
Balochistan	Nawab Mohammad Khan Jogezai

== Gallery ==
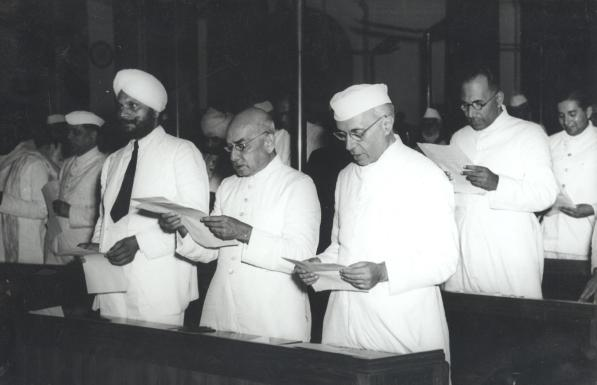
Jawaharlal Nehru and other members taking pledge during the midnight session of the Constituent Assembly of India held on 14 and 15 August 1947.

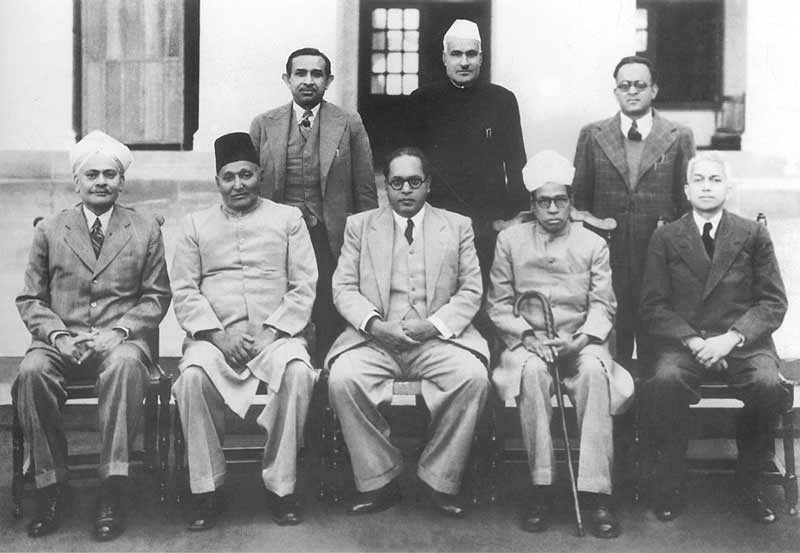
Dr. Babasaheb Ambedkar, chairman, with other members of the Drafting Committee of the Constituent Assembly of India, on 29 August 1947.

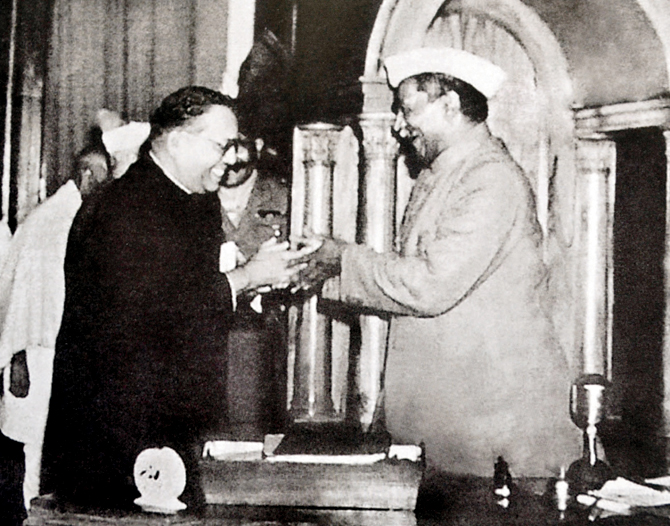
Dr. Babasaheb Ambedkar, chairman of the Drafting Committee, presenting the final draft of the Indian Constitution to Dr. Rajendra Prasad, President of constituent assembly on 25 November 1949.

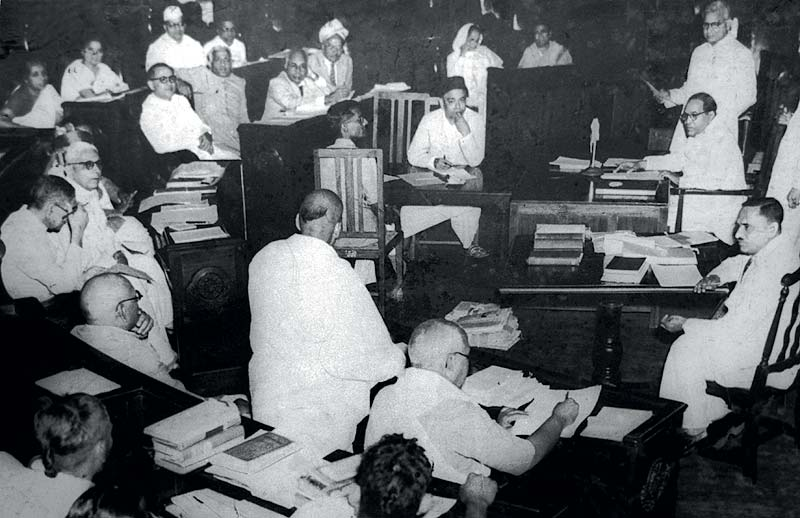
Constituent Assembly of India.

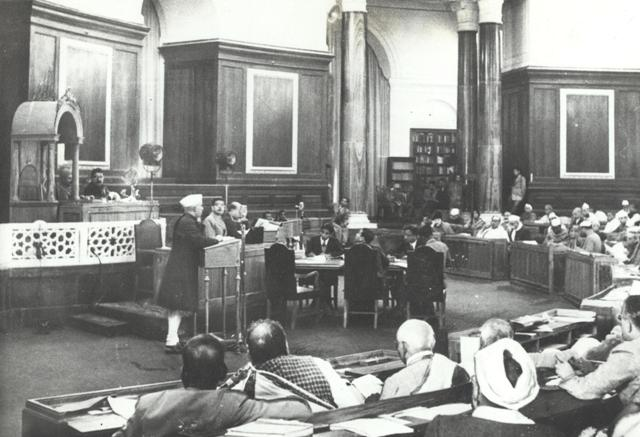
Jawaharlal Nehru addressing the constituent assembly in 1946.
