= List of members of the 1st Constituent Assembly of Pakistan =

1st Constituent Assembly of Pakistan
2nd	→
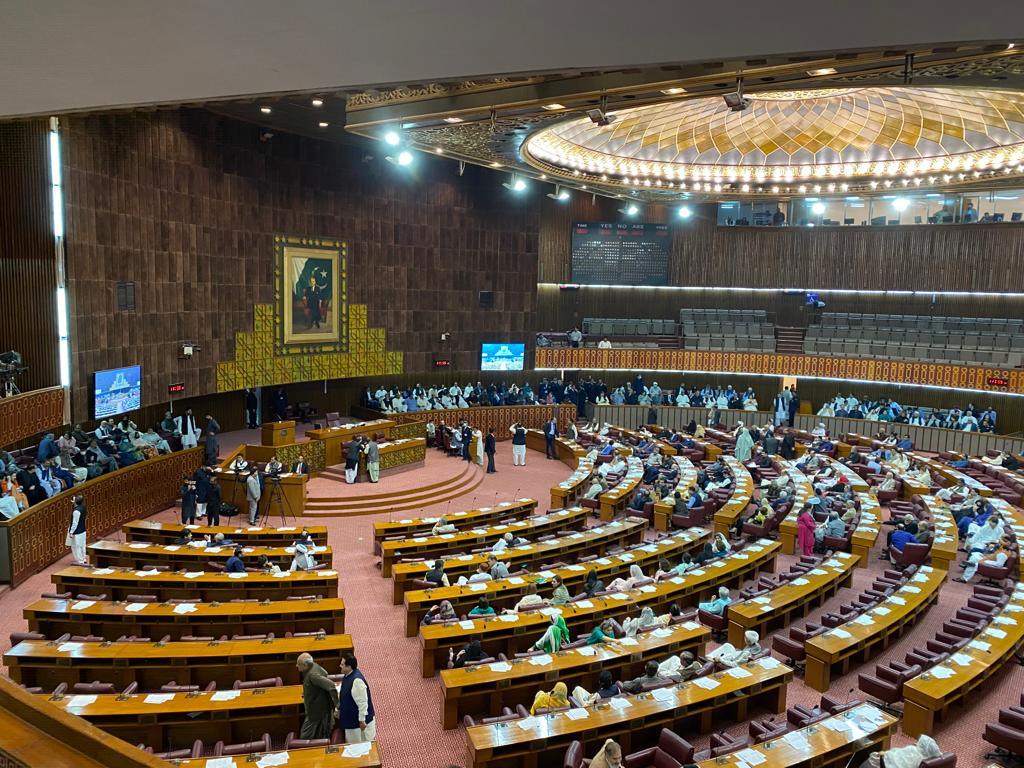

Overview
- Legislative body: Constituent Assembly of Pakistan
- Jurisdiction: Dominion of Pakistan
- Term: 1947 – 1954
- Election: 1947 Pakistani Constituent Assembly election
- Government: Government of Pakistan
- Opposition: Pakistan National Congress
- Website: Official website

Sovereign
- Members: 100

The 1st Parliament of Pakistan was the unicameral legislature of Pakistan formed after the partition of India. There were 100 Members of Parliament, including 44 from East Bengal, 17 from West Punjab, 3 from the Northwest Frontier Province, 4 from Sindh, and 1 from Balochistan. Four of West Punjab's 17 allocated seats laid vacant.

== East Bengal ==
1. Abdullah al Mahmood
2. Abdullah el Baqui
3. Abdul Hamid
4. Abdul Kasem Khan
5. Mohammad Akram Khan
6. A. M. A. Hamid
7. Azizuddin Ahmad
8. Muhammad Habibullah Bahar
9. Prem Hari Barma
10. Raj Kumar Chakraverty
11. Sris Chandra Chattopadhyaya
12. Abdul Matin Chaudhary
13. Murtaza Raza Choudhry
14. Hamidul Huq Choudhury
15. Akshay Kumar Das
16. Dhirendranath Datta
17. Bhupendra Kumar Datta
18. Ibrahim Khan
19. A. K. Fazlul Huq
20. Fazlur Rahman
21. Ghayasuddin Pathan
22. Shaista Suhrawardy Ikramullah
23. Liaquat Ali Khan
24. Mafizuddin Ahmad
25. Mahmud Hussain
26. Jnanendra Chandra Majumdar
27. Abdul Motaleb Malik
28. Birat Chandra Mandal
29. Jogendra Nath Mandal
30. Mohammad Ali Bogra
31. Khawaja Nazimuddin
32. Nur Ahmed
33. Nurul Amin
34. Ishtiaq Hussain Qureshi
35. Dhananjoy Roy
36. Maudi Bhakesh Chanda
37. Serajul Islam
38. Shabbir Ahmad Usmani
39. Khwaja Shahabuddin
40. Huseyn Shaheed Suhrawardy
41. Harendra Kumar Sur
42. Tamizuddin Khan
43. Kawivi Kerwar Datta
44. Malik Ghulam Muhammad

== West Punjab ==
1. Mian Mumtaz Mohammad Khan Daultana
2. Ganga Saran
3. Zafarullah Khan
4. Iftikhar Hussain Khan
5. Mian Muhammad Iftikharuddin
6. Muhammad Ali Jinnah
7. Sheikh Karamat Ali
8. Nazir Ahmad Khan
9. Sardar Abdur Rab Nistar
10. Feroz Khan Noon
11. Omar Hayat Malik
12. Shah Nawaz Begum Jahan Ara
13. Sardar Shaukat Hyat Khan

== Northwest Frontier Province ==
1. Khan Abdul Ghaffar Khan
2. Khan Sardar Bahadur Khan
3. Sardar Asad Ullah Jan Khan

== Sindh ==
1. Abdus Sattar Abdur Rahman
2. Alhajj Muhammad Hashim Gazder
3. Muhammad Ayub Khuhro

== Changes from July 1949–1954 ==
This is a list of changes in members of the first constituent assembly from July 1949 – 1954.

Sr. No.	Name	City	Date
1	Shahoodul Haque	Tripperah	July 1949
2	Abdul Basher Mahmood Hussain	Dacca	July 1949
3	Seth Sukhdiv	Karachi	July 1949
4	Mumtaz Hasan Kizilbash	Kairpur State	December 1949
5	Maulvi Fazl-I-Hussain	Bahawalpur State	December 1949
6	Jam Sahib Ghulam Qadir Khan	States of Baluchistan	December 1949
7	Abdul Monem Khan	Mymensingh	April 1950
8	Asadullah	Dacca	April 1950
9	Zakeeruddin Moezzem Hossain (ch. (Salmia).	Faridpur	April 1950
10	Abdul Hamid Khan Soofi	Lahore	April 1950
11	Abdul Wahid Khan	Lahore	April 1950
12	Chaudhry Ali Akbar Khan	Lyallpur	April 1950
13	Ghulam Bhik Nairang	Lahore	April 1950
14	Mushtaq Ahmad Gurmani	Karachi	April 1950
15	Rallia Rana	Lahore	April 1950
16	Sadiq Hasan Shaikh	Lahore	April 1950
17	Ahmad Ebrahim Haroon Jaffar	Karachi	April 1950
18	Muhammad Ayub Khuhro	Karachi	April 1950
19	Syed Hasan Mahmood	Bahawalpur	October 1951
20	Amir Azam Khan Sardar	Rawalpindi	January 1952
21	Peshotan Bhandara	Lahore	January 1952
22	Mohammad Ali Ch.	Karachi	January 1952
23	Khalilur Rahman Syed	Lahore	January 1952
24	Shaukat Ali Malik	Lahore	January 1952
25	Mohammad Abul Quasem	Rangpur	1953
26	Shamser Rahman Syed	Jaisur	1953
27	Wahiduzzaman	Dacca	1953
28	Khwaja Habibullah	Dacca	1953
29	Abdul Qayyum Khan	Karachi	1953
30	Shuaib Qureshi	Karachi	1953
31	A. K. Brohi	Karachi	1953
