= 1956 Constitution of Pakistan =

Supreme law of Pakistan from 1956 to 1958

1956 Constitution of Pakistan ۱۹۵۶ آئینِ پاکستان (Urdu) পাকিস্তানের ১৯৫৬ সালের সংবিধান (Bengali)
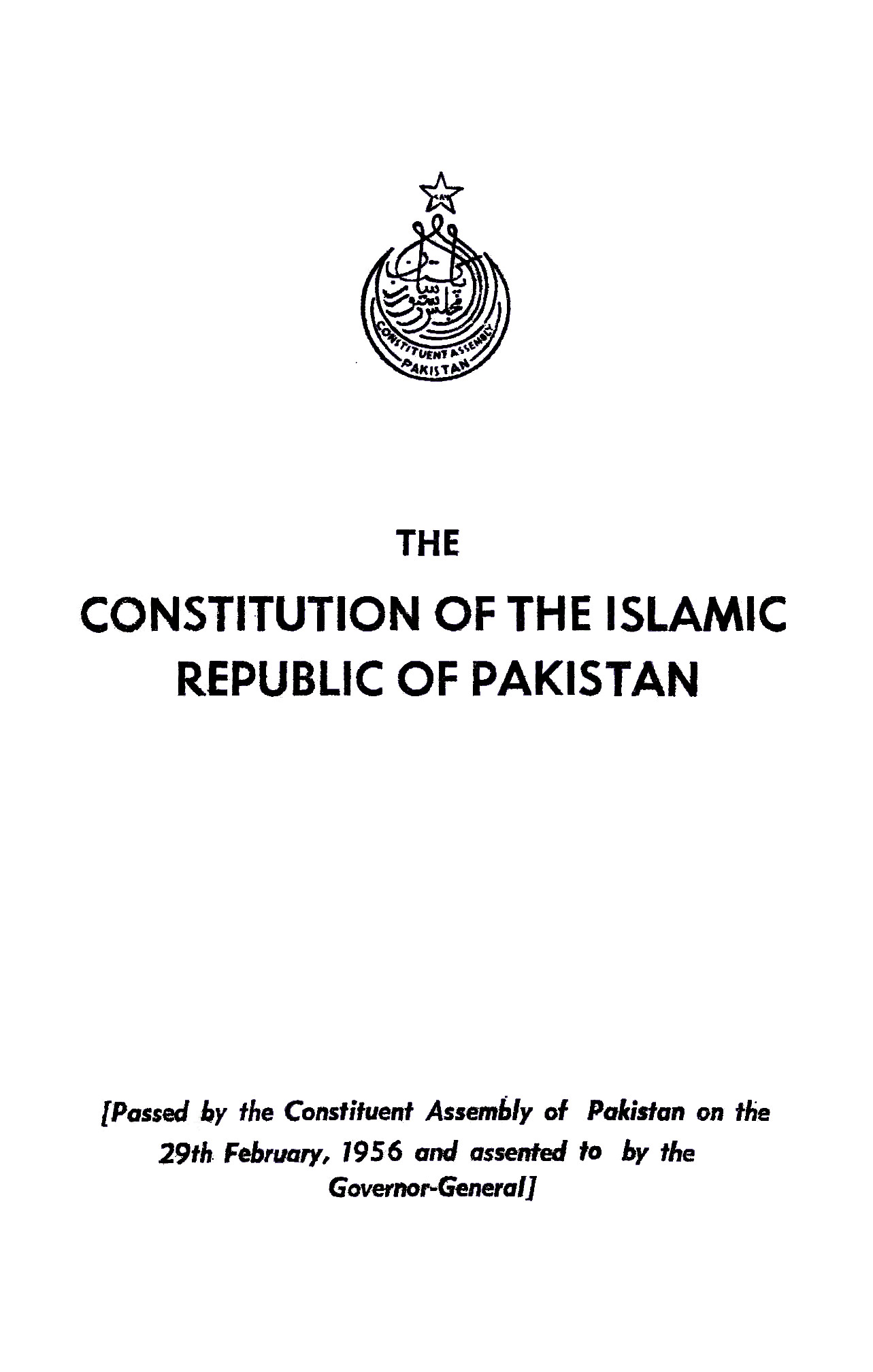
- Cover of the constitution

Overview
- Jurisdiction: Pakistan
- Created: 7 July 1955 – 9 January 1956
- Presented: 9 January 1956; 70 years ago
- Ratified: 29 February 1956
- Date effective: 23 March 1956
- System: Federal semi-parliamentary republic

Government structure
- Branches: Three (Executive, Legislature, and Judiciary)
- Head of state: President of Pakistan
- Chambers: One (National Assembly)
- Executive: Prime minister–led cabinet responsible to the National Assembly
- Judiciary: Supreme court, high courts, and district courts
- Federalism: Yes (two provinces and a federal territory) (Note: Azad Kashmir and six princely states (namely Amb, Chitral, Dir, Hunza, Nagar, and Swat) were not within the federation as they had the status of self-governing autonomous states, while Northern Areas (excluding Hunza and Nagar) was administered directly by the federal government.)
- Electoral college: No

History
- Repealed: 7 October 1958 (abrogated by President Iskander Mirza through martial law)
- Amendments: None
- Location: Sindh Assembly Building, Karachi
- Commissioned by: Constituent Assembly of Pakistan
- Author: Constituent Assembly of Pakistan
- Media type: Paperback
- Supersedes: Government of India Act 1935; Indian Independence Act 1947
- Superseded by: 1962 Constitution of Pakistan

The 1956 Constitution was the fundamental law of Pakistan from 23 March 1956 till 7 October 1958. Adopted by the Constituent Assembly of Pakistan, it was the first constitution of an independent Pakistan and ended the dominion status by establishing an Islamic Republic. It lasted over 2 and a half years when it was abrogated by President Iskander Mirza through a martial law. Consisting of 234 articles, 13 parts and 6 schedules, the constitution promulgated a federal semi-parliamentary system with the President as head of state and the Prime Minister as head of government.

== Origins ==
Pakistan became independent from the United Kingdom in 1947, but remained a British Dominion, like Canada and Australia, until 1956. Under Section 8 of the Indian Independence Act, 1947, the Government of India Act 1935 - with certain adaptations - served as the working constitution of Pakistan; still, the need of a full independence and a constitution to be framed by the elected representatives of the people was all the more necessary for the free citizens of a sovereign state. Therefore, the first Constituent Assembly was formed under the Independence Act and was entrusted with two separate functions:

- To frame a Constitution for the country, and
- To set as a Federal Legislative Assembly or Parliament until that Constitution came into effect.

The powers and functions of the central legislature under the Government of India Act were conferred on the Constituent Assembly. The Constituent Assembly could, however, amend the Indian Independence Act (1947) or the Government of India Act (1935) and no Act of the British Parliament could be extended to Pakistan without legislation by the Constituent Assembly. The first Constituent Assembly originally consisted of 69 members; subsequently the number of members was increased to 79.

The first major step in the framing of a constitution for Pakistan was taken by the Constituent Assembly on 12 March 1949, when it passed a resolution on the 'Aims and Objectives of the Constitution', popularly known as the Objectives Resolution. It laid the foundation of the constitution and indicated the broad outline of its structure. The resolution was moved by Liaquat Ali Khan, the first Prime Minister of Pakistan. While moving the Resolution, he said:

Sir, I consider this to be the most important occasion in the life of this country, next in importance only to the achievement of independence, because by achieving independence we only won an opportunity of building up a country and its polity in accordance with our ideals. I would like to remind the house that the Father of the Nation, Quaid-i-Azam, gave expression of his feelings on this matter on many occasions, and his views were endorsed by the nation in unmistakable terms, Pakistan was founded because the Muslims of this sub-continent wanted to build up their lives in accordance with the teachings and traditions of Islam, because they wanted to demonstrate to the world that Islam provides a panacea to the many diseases which have crept into the life of humanity today.

The resolution was debated for five days. The leading members of the government and a large number of non-Muslim members, especially from East Bengal, took a prominent part. Non-Muslim members expressed grave apprehensions about their position and role in the new policy. Hindu members of the Constitutional Assembly argued that the Objectives Resolution differed with Muhammad Ali Jinnah's (Quaid-e-Azam) view in all the basic points. Sris Chandra Chattopadhyaya said:

What I hear in this (Objectives) Resolution is not the voice of the great creator of Pakistan - the Quaid-i-Azam, nor even that of the Prime Minister of Pakistan the Honorable Mr. Liaquat Ali Khan, but of the Ulema of the land.

Birat Chandra Mandal declared that Jinnah had "unequivocally said that Pakistan will be a secular state." Bhupendra Kumar Datta went a step further: "...were this resolution to come before this house within the life-time of the Great Creator of Pakistan, the Quaid-i-Azam, it would not have come in its present shape...."

However, Muslim scholars and a large portion of the people of Pakistan were of the view that this was exactly what the Quaid-a-Azam wanted and that it was a good step forward in the constitutional history of Pakistan. They also argued that objective resolution provided the minorities with equal rights and that they had no compulsion, whatsoever, in adopting or converting into Islam.

After nine years of efforts, Pakistan was successful in framing a constitution. The Constituent Assembly adopted it on 29 February 1956, and it was enforced on 23 March 1956, proclaiming Pakistan to be an Islamic republic.

== Provisions ==
Both Bengali and Urdu were made state language and used in the State emblem of Pakistan.

The Constitution of 1956 was lengthy and detailed; it contained 234 articles divided into thirteen parts and six schedules. The Constitution of 1956 provided for federal system with the principle of parity between East Pakistan and West Pakistan. The Federal Legislature was to perform like the British Parliament. The Centre was invested with such powers as to take unilateral action in emergency and it could influence the provincial autonomy.

The Constitution of 1956 provided for the parliamentary form of government, where real executive authority was vested in a cabinet, collectively responsible to the legislature. The cabinet was presided over by the Prime Minister. The Constitution declared that there would be only one house of parliament known as the National Assembly and equality between the two Wings (i.e. East Pakistan and West Pakistan) was maintained in it. The Queen of Pakistan was replaced by a President, who was to be elected by the Electoral College of Pakistan composed of members of the National Assembly and Provincial Assembly.

Familiar democratic rights and freedoms such as freedom of speech and expression, of assembly and association, of movement and of profession were all provided in the Constitution, with the usual qualifications. With regard to civil rights, familiar rights such as rights of life, liberty and property were granted, again with the usual qualifications and safeguards. The executive was given power to enforce the fundamental rights and the courts were to decide if a law was repugnant to any provisions of the fundamental rights.

As per the Constitution, Urdu and Bengali were made national languages.

=== Salient features ===
- Written Constitution - this is a written and lengthy document. It consists of 234 Articles divided into 13 parts and 6 schedules.
- Flexible Constitution - The constitution could be modified with the approval of at least two thirds of the parliament, the constitution may be changed or amended. However the president had the right to veto the draft, which then could be overridden by simple parliamentary majority.
- Islamic Republic of Pakistan - The name of the country was adopted as the Islamic Republic of Pakistan.
- Objectives Resolution - The objective resolution was included as a preamble of the constitution.
- Federal System - The constitution provides for a federal system in the country. Powers was divided between the center and the provinces. The subjects were divided into three lists; The Federal List, The Provincial List, and the Concurrent List.
- Unicameral Legislature - The legislature would consist of a single house. Both the wings of the country were given representation in the National Assembly. The National Assembly consisted of 300 members. 150 members were drawn from each wing.
- Parliamentary System - Parliamentary system was adopted, according to it the President was the head of state and the Prime Minister the head of government.
- The President - Required to be a Muslim of at least forty years of age. The tenure of his office was five years. In case of internal or external danger he could declare a state of emergency in the country. He was authorized to appoint the Governors, the Judges of the Supreme Court, Auditor General and the Advocate General.
- The Prime Minister - He was to be the leader of the Parliamentary group and was thus indirectly elected by the people. He could choose his cabinet from the members of the National Assembly; the cabinet was answerable to the Assembly.
- Provincial Autonomy - Curtailed in the constitution to a great extent.
- Islamic Law - No law would be passed against the teachings of the Quran and Sunnah.
- Free Judiciary - An independent judiciary in the country. A Supreme Court interpreted the constitution, advised the state whenever required, and decided the issues whenever required.
- Fundamental Rights - Included freedom of movement, freedom of speech and expression, freedom to choose profession and freedom to profess religion. Right to life, liberty, and property.
- Language - Urdu & Bengali

== Issues ==
Despite the province of East Pakistan accounting for a clear majority of the total population of Pakistan, the representation in the National Assembly was set at half of the total membership. This meant that East Pakistan was underrepresented in the Assembly under this Constitution.

== Demise ==
On 7 October 1958, President Iskander Mirza staged a coup d'état. He abrogated the constitution, imposed martial law and appointed General Muhammad Ayub Khan as the Chief Martial Law Administrator and Aziz Ahmad as Secretary General and Deputy Chief Martial Law Administrator. However, three weeks later General Ayub—who had been openly questioning the authority of the government prior to the imposition of martial law—deposed Iskandar Mirza on 27 October 1958 and assumed the presidency, which practically formalized the militarization of the political system in Pakistan. Four years later, a new document, Constitution of 1962 was adopted. This was eventually succeeded by the Constitution of 1973.

== See also ==
- History of Pakistan
- Politics of Pakistan
- Constitution of Pakistan of 1962
- Constitution of Pakistan
- Military coups in Pakistan
- Military history of Pakistan
- Political history of Pakistan
- Administrative units of Pakistan
- Government of East Pakistan
- Pakistani English

Comparable acts asserting ex-Dominion sovereignty

- Australia Act 1986
- Canada Act 1982
- Constitution of India
- Constitution of Ireland
- New Zealand Constitution Act 1986
- Sri Lankan Constitution of 1972
- Status of the Union Act, 1934 and South African Constitution of 1961
