= Haider Hussain =

Haider Hussain may refer to:

- Hyder Husyn, Bangladeshi singer-songwriter
- Haider Hussain (field hockey) (born 1979), Pakistani field hockey player
- Chaudhari Hyder Husein, Indian politician
