= Saudagar =

Saudagar may refer to:

- Saudagar (1973 film), a 1973 Bollywood film directed by Sudhendu Roy
- Saudagar (1991 film), a 1991 Bollywood film directed by Subhash Ghai
- Sapno Ka Saudagar, a 1968 film directed by Mahesh Kaul

== People ==
- Momin Ansari, an Urdu-speaking Muslim community also known as Saudagar
- Saudagar (surname) used in Bengal

== See also ==
- Punjabi Saudagaran-e-Delhi
