= Kishori Mohan Tripathi =

Kishori Mohan Tripathi was an Indian politician and member of the Constituent Assembly of India from the Central Provinces.

== Early life ==
Tripathi was born on 8 November 1912 in the Sarangarh State.

== Career ==
Tripathi became a member of the Indian parliament in 1950 at the age of 37 and served till 1952.

== Death and legacy ==
Tripathi died on 25 September 1994. Kishori Mohan Tripathi Government Girls College is a college in Punjab state named after him.

Tripathi's grandson, Colonel Viplav Tripathi, was killed in action in Manipur State while serving in the Assam Rifles.

== See also ==
Viplav Tripathi
