= Yashwant Rai =

Member of Constituent Assembly of India
- In office 9 December 1946 – 24 January 1950

Personal details
- Born: 16 May 1915 Jagroan, Punjab, British India
- Party: Indian National Congress

Yashwant Rai was an Indian politician. He was a member of the Constituent Assembly of India. He was the only Harijan nominee from Punjab.
