= Daulatkhan Upazila =

Daulatkhan দৌলতখান
- Upazila
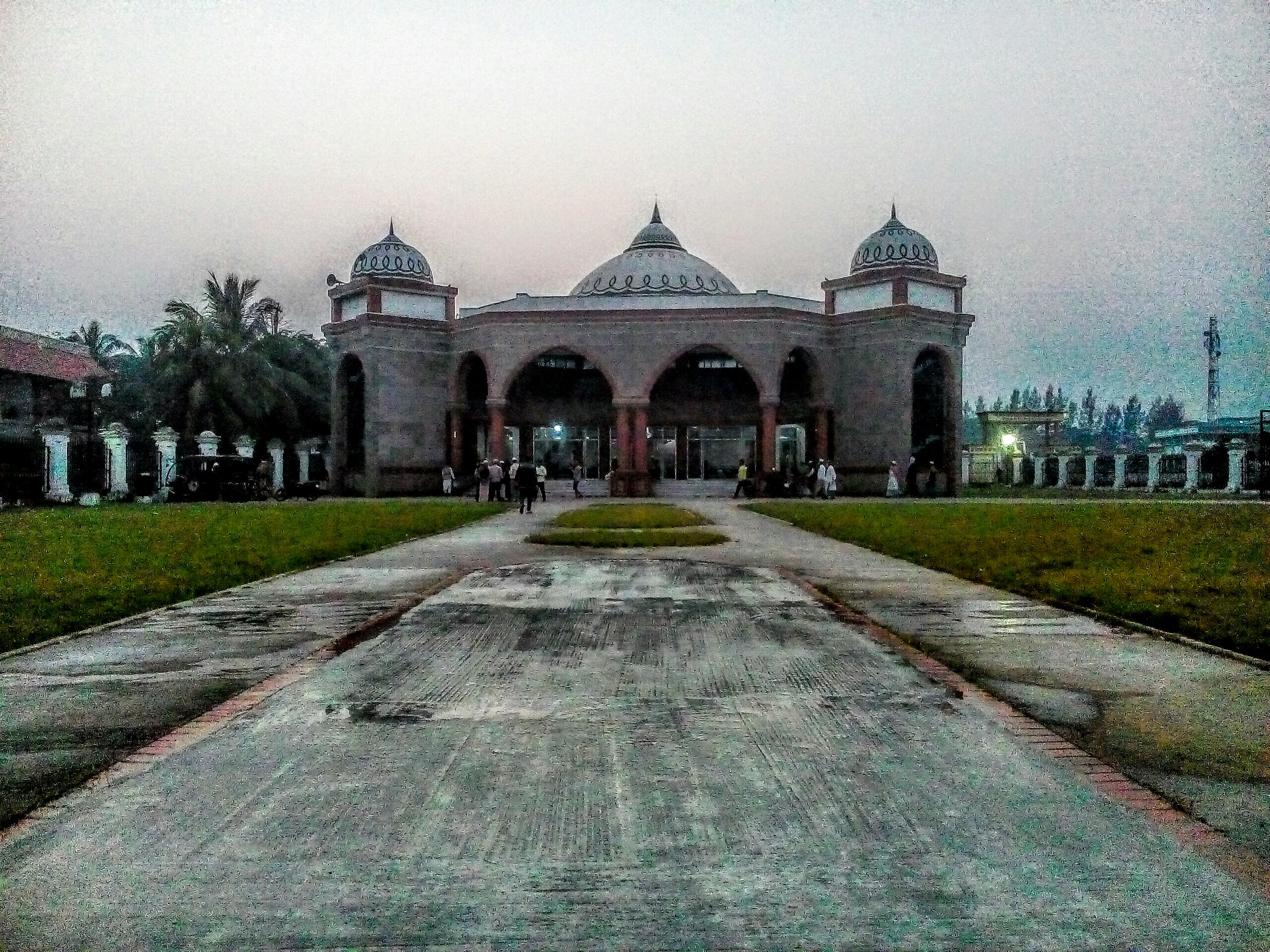
- Fatema Khanom Zame Mosque, Daulatkhan upazila, Bhola district

- Coordinates: 22°36.4′N 90°44.1′E
- Country: Bangladesh
- Division: Barisal Division
- District: Bhola District

Area
  - Total: 316.99 km^{2} (122.39 sq mi)
- Elevation: 7 m (23 ft)

Population (2022)
  - Total: 181,813
  - Density: 573.56/km^{2} (1,485.5/sq mi)
  - Male: 87,464
  - Female: 94,345
- Time zone: UTC+6 (BST)
- Postal code: 8310
- Area code: 04924
- Website: Official Map of the Daulatkhan Upazila

Daulatkhan (Bengali: দৌলতখান) is an upazila of Bhola District in the Division of Barisal, Bangladesh.

== Geography ==
Daulatkhan is located at 22.6069°N 90.7358°E. It has 29,233 households and its total area is 316.99 km^{2} (122.39 sq mi). It is bounded by Bhola sadar and Lakshmipur sadar upazilas on the north, Burhanuddin and Tazumuddin upazilas on the south, Ramgati upazila on the east, and Bhola Sadar upazila on the west.

== Demographics ==
Religions in Daulatkhan Upazila (2022)
| Religion | Percent |
| Islam | 97.82% |
| Hinduism | 2.17% |
| Other or not stated | 0.01% |

According to the 2022 Bangladeshi census, Daulatkhan Upazila had 42,302 households and a population of 181,813. 11.31% of the population were under 5 years of age. Daulatkhan had a literacy rate (age 7 and over) of 66.67%: 65.61% for males and 67.63% for females, and a sex ratio of 92.71 males for every 100 females. 61,207 (33.66%) lived in urban areas.

As of the 2011 Census of Bangladesh, Daulatkhan has a population of 168,567 living in 34,670 households. 45,544 (24.38%) were under 10 years of age. Daulatkhan has an average literacy rate of 41.60% (7+ years) and a sex ratio of 1022 females per 1000 males. 16,728 (9.92%) of the population lives in urban areas.

Par the 2001 Bangladesh census, Daulatkhan had a population of 173253, including male 90670, female 82583; Muslim 168823, Hindu 4401 and others 29.

According to the 1991 Bangladesh census, Daulatkhan had a population of 153,458, of whom 69,112 were aged 18 or older. Males constituted 52.54% of the population, and females 47.46%. Daulatkhan had an average literacy rate of 24.5% (7+ years), against the national average of 32.4%.

== Administration ==
Daulatkhan Thana was formed in 1872 and it was turned into an upazila on 1 August 1983.

Daulatkhan Upazila is divided into Daulatkhan Municipality and nine union parishads: Char Khalifa, Charpata, Dakshin Joynagar, Hazipur, Madanpur, Madua, Sayedpur, Uttar Joynagar, and Vhovanipur. The union parishads are subdivided into 25 mauzas and 25 villages.

Daulatkhan Municipality is subdivided into 9 wards and 9 mahallas.

== Notable people ==
- Amir Jang Ghaznavi Bangladeshi ex-footballer
- Mostafa Kamal (Bir Sreshtho) Bir Shrestho
- Azizuddin Ahmad (1897–1968), former Pakistan Minister for Minority Affairs
- Mostafa Kamal (1947–1971), sepoy and freedom fighter
- Ali Azam, former MP for Bhola-2

== See also ==
- Upazilas of Bangladesh
- Districts of Bangladesh
- Divisions of Bangladesh
