= A. M. A. Hamid =

Pakistani politician

A. M. A. Hamid was a member of the National Assembly of Pakistan representing East Bengal.

== Career ==
Hamid was elected to the 1st National Assembly of Pakistan from East Pakistan as a Muslim candidate in 1947.

Hamid challenged allegations made by Congress members of the National Assembly that there was violence against Hindu minorities in East Pakistan. He stated that Hindu businessmen were taking away capital and machinery from East Bengal to India.
