= Thakur Ramprasad Potai =

Indian politician

Member of Constituent Assembly of India
- In office 9 December 1946 – 25 January 1950
- Constituency: Central Provinces States

Personal details
- Born: Pharso; 1923 Kanker district
- Died: 6 October 1962 (aged 38–39)
- Parent: Ghanshyam Singh Potai

Thakur Ramprasad Potai was an Indian politician who served as Member of Constituent Assembly of India. He also played role in making Indian Constitution.

== Personal life ==
He was born to Ghanshyam Singh Potai in 1923 in Kanker district. His childhood name was Pharso. He died on 6 October 1962.
