= Muhammad Ibrahim (academic) =

Bangladeshi academic

- মুহাম্মদ ইব্রাহীম
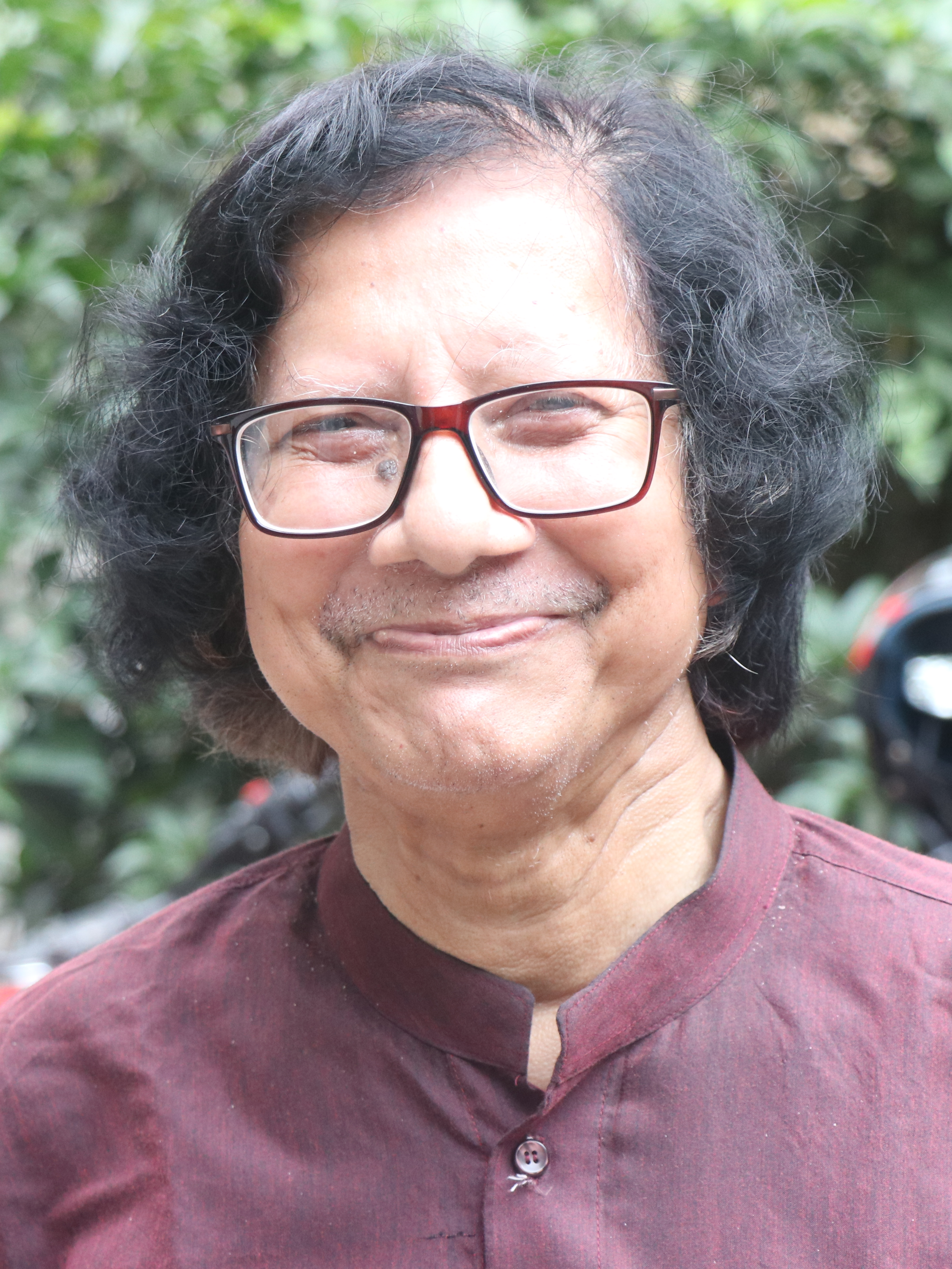
- Ibrahim in 2018
- Born: 1 December 1945 (age 80); Chittagong, Bengal, British India
- Education: University of Dhaka; University of Southampton
- Occupation: Academic
- Father: Dula Mia Saudagar
- Relatives: Muhammad Yunus (brother)

Muhammad Ibrahim (Bengali: মুহাম্মদ ইব্রাহীম; born 1 December 1945) is a Bangladeshi academic. He is a former professor of physics at University of Dhaka. He is the moderator of the show Desh o Biggyan on Bangladesh Television. He is the editor of Bigyan Shamoiki, the first monthly science magazine of Bangladesh. Since January 2015, he has been serving as a professor of the General Education Department at University of Liberal Arts Bangladesh (ULAB).

Ibrahim is the recipient of Bangla Academy Literary Award (2006) in the science category.

== Background and education ==
The fourth of nine children, Muhammad Ibrahim was born on 1 December 1945 in the city of Chittagong, Bengal Presidency. He belongs to a Bengali family of Muslim Saudagars hailing from the village of Bathua, by the Kaptai road in Hathazari subdivision. His father was Haji Muhammad Dula Mia Saudagar, a Sufi jeweller, and his mother was Sufia Khatun. One of his elder brothers is ex-Chief Advisor Muhammad Yunus. By 1949, his mother was afflicted with psychological illness. He studied at the Chittagong College. Around 1962, he got admitted into the physics department of the University of Dhaka where he completed his bachelor's and master's in 1965 and 1966 respectively. He earned his Ph.D. from the University of Southampton on surface physics in 1972.

His siblings were in order; Momtaz Begum, Muhammad Abdus Salam, Professor Muhammad Yunus, Doctor Muhammad Ibrahim (self), Umme Kulsum, Muhammad Ayub, Muhammad Azam, Muhammad Jahangir, Muhammad Moinul Alam

== Career ==
Ibrahim was a faculty member in University of Dhaka's Physics Department until he retired in 2012. He served as the director of Renewable Energy Research Centre at the same university. He also served as a visiting professor in BRAC University.

Ibrahim is the founder and executive director of Centre for Mass Education and Science (CMES), an NGO which aims to promote the use of science and technology at the root level.

== Awards ==
- Bangla Academy Literary Award (2006)
- WorldAware Business Award (2004)
- Institute of Diploma Engineer Gold Medal (2000)
- Qudrat-E-Khuda Gold Medal (1989)
- Agroni Bank Award for Children Literature (1987)
