= Dalel Singh =

Indian politician

Apji Dalel Singh

Constituent Assembly of India
- In office 9 December 1946 – 24 January 1950

Personal details
- Born: 18 March 1909 Palaitha – Rajasthan, India
- Died: 8 March 1984 (aged 74) Kota – Rajasthan, India
- Spouse: Smt. Sajan Kumari
- Children: 2 Sons, 4 Daughters
- Education: Banaras Hindu University

Lieutenant Colonel Apji Dalel Singh (Hindi: ले. कल. आप्जी दलेल सिंह) (18 March 1909 – 8 March 1984) was a member of the Constituent Assembly of India. He hails from Thikana "Palaitha", a premier principality of the erstwhile Kotah State in Rajasthan. He represented Kotah state in the Constituent Assembly of India from 1946 to 1950.

== Education and early life ==
Apji Dalel Singh completed his schooling from Herbert School at Kotah and then went on to Banaras Hindu University, one of the most prestigious Universities in India of that time and even of today. He studied Political Science and earned his Master of Arts in the same subject in 1932.

An ardent cricketer, he played on the University Cricket team as 1 of the 2 opening batsmen. Story goes that during his master's degree, he played on behalf of the university staff against the students' team where the staff made 121 runs and lost. Alas, his "modest" score of 110 not out couldn't help them to win the match.

After his University studies, he travelled to London to study for the Indian Civil Service Exam. On narrowly missing the opportunity, he travelled back to India and decided to work for his cousin, the Maharaja of Jaipur, HH Sawai Man Singh II in the state government, where he served as Secretary in various ministries.

In 1945, the Maharao of Kotah, HH Bhim Singh II asked him to return to Kotah and represent the state at New Delhi in the Constituent Assembly of India.

== The years as a Member of Parliament ==
During the late 1940s he was a member of the Constituent Assembly of India and got the opportunity to live in Delhi and see firsthand the process of Indian Independence. His work brought him in close proximity to Sardar Vallabhbhai Patel, Pt. Heera Lal Shastri and Sir V. T. Krishnamachari amongst others.

Representing the States in the Assembly he often spoke on behalf of and for the rights of the States. Therefore, at times he was at opposing end of the views of Pt. Jawaharlal Nehru and the Indian National Congress. Some of these incidences disillusioned him with Indian Politics.

== Later life ==
After the end of term of the Constituent Assembly of India in January 1950, Pt. Heera Lal Shastri invited him to join his ministry in Jaipur after he became the Chief Minister of Rajasthan. But having been disillusioned with politics, he politely declined and decided to work for the state of Kotah, which he did even after the merger of the States in the Republic in 1952.

== Illness and death ==
During the last two years of his life, Apji Dalel Singh suffered from ill health. On 8 March 1984, he suffered a heart attack and died in his sleep. He was cremated at Kotah.
