= Girija Shankar Guha =

Indian politician (1893–??)

Member of the Constituent Assembly of India
- In office 28 April 1947 – 1950
- Appointed by: Bir Bikram Kishore Debbarman

Minister to the King of Tripura

Personal details
- Education: Presidency University, Kolkata, University of Calcutta, Cotton University

Girija Shankar Guha (23 December 1893-NA) was a member of the Constituent Assembly of India representing Tripura and Manipur.

== Biography ==
Guha was born on 23 December 1893 in Shillong, Assam.

Guha studied at the Cotton University, Department of Law, University of Calcutta, and Presidency University, Kolkata.

Guha served as a Minister to the King of Tripura. He also worked as a Barrister. Guha was a former Deputy Commissioner of Sylhet District.

Maharaja Bir Bikram Kishore Manikya appointed Guha 28 April 1947 to the Constituent Assembly of India to represent Tripura after deciding to join India. Guha signed the Instrument of Accession which led to Tripura and Manipur becoming states of India.
