= Naziruddin Ahmad =

Member - Constituent Assembly of India

Member of the Constituent Assembly of India

Personal details
- Born: 25 December 1889 Kulia, Bardhaman district, West Bengal
- Education: Surendranath Law College of the University of Calcutta
- Profession: Advocate

Naziruddin Ahmad was a member of the Constituent Assembly of India representing West Bengal. He had been critical of the Drafting Committee and draft constitution of India. He talked about inclusion of interplanetary travel in the constitution.

== Early life ==
Ahmad was born on 25 December 1889 in Kulia, Bardhaman district, West Bengal. He studied at the Burdwan Raj Collegiate School. He earned a law degree from the Surendranath Law College of the University of Calcutta.

== Career ==
Ahmad practised law at the Calcutta High Court and the Federal Court of India. In 1919, he was elected vice-chairman of Bardhaman. He was appointed the public prosecutor of Bardhaman district in 1924 and served till 1928. He worked at the Burdwan Muhammedan Association as its secretary. He founded and edited Burdwan Vani. He was also the secretary of Bengal Raiyat Association.

Ahmad served in the Bengal Legislative Council and was the whip in the government of A. K. Fazlul Huq. He was elected to the Constituent Assembly of India from the Muslim League.
