= Ranjit Singh (politician) =

Indian politician

Ranjit Singh was an Indian politician who served as Member of Constituent Assembly of India from Patiala and East Punjab States Union. He was born in November, 1897 in Sangrur district. During the British regime he was awarded the title of Sardar Bahadur.
