= Mostafa Kamal (Bir Sreshtho) =

Bangladeshi freedom fighter and recipient of Bir Sreshtho award (1947–1971)

Mustafa Kamal Bir Sreshtho
- Born: Mohammad Mustafa Kamal; 16 December 1947; Daulatkhan, East Bengal, Pakistan
- Died: 18 April 1971 (aged 23); Akhaura, Tippera District, Bangladesh
- Military career
- Allegiance: Bangladesh; Pakistan (before 1971)
- Branch: Bangladesh Army; Pakistan Army
- Service years: 1967-1971
- Rank: Sepoy
- Unit: 4th East Bengal Regiment
- Conflicts: Bangladesh Liberation War: Battle of Daruin †
- Awards: Bir Sreshtho
- Other work: Sector 2

Mohammad Mustafa Kamal (Bengali: মোহাম্মদ মোস্তফা কামাল), better known as Shaheed Sipahi Mustafa Kamal, was a sepoy in the Bangladesh Army during the Liberation War. He was born on 16 December 1947 in Hajipur village of Daulatkhan upazila under Bhola district. His father, Habibur Rahman, was a havildar. On 18 April 1971, Mostafa Kamal was killed in a defensive battle against the Pakistan Army in Daruin village of Brahmanbaria. He was posthumously awarded Bir Sreshtho.

== Biography ==
Mustafa Kamal was born in 1947 at the Poshchim Hajipur village under Daulatkhana Upazila in Bhola district. His father was a havildar in the army. Kamal had his education only up to second grade and spent most of his childhood with his father at the Comilla Cantonment. On 16 December 1967, Kamal escaped from his house and joined the East Bengal Regiment. Mostafa Kamal was a well-known boxer. During mid-March in 1971, he was transferred from Comilla Cantonment to the headquarters of the 4th East Bengal Regiment at Brahmanbaria. As the Bangladesh Liberation War started in 1971, the East Bengal Regiment had taken control of Brahmanbaria with three defence bases at Ashuganj, Ujanishwar, and Anderson Lake. But the Pakistani Army continued attacking with their heavy artillery in these places. As a result, the East Bengal Regiment retreated back to Akhaura, Shanti Nagar, and Darwin. 2nd Platoon was sent to Darwin to reinforce the troops. Mostafa Kamal was a soldier of this platoon. Major Shafayat Jamil verbally declared him as the Lance Naek and gave him the responsibility of leading a team. He died at Darwin on 18 April 1971 during a battle against the Pakistan Army. He was buried at Darwin. He was posthumously rewarded as "Bir Shrestho", the highest gallantry award in Bangladesh. A postage stamp was also published to pay respect to him.

== Battle of Daruin ==
Battle of Daruin
- Part of Bangladesh Liberation War
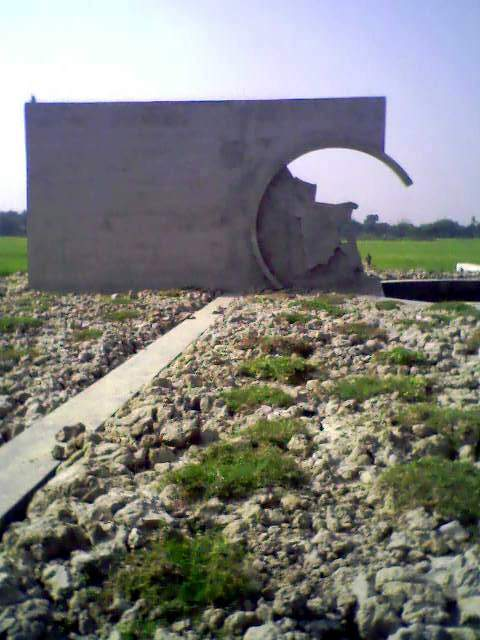
- Mausoleum of Mostafa Kamal
| Date | 16–18 April 1971 (2 days) |
| Location | Daruin, Brahmanbaria, Pakistan |
| Result | Pakistani victory: Daruin recaptured by Pakistan |

Belligerents
| Pakistan: Pakistan Army | Bangladesh: Mukti Bahini |

Commanders and leaders
| Unknown | Shafaat Jamil; Mostafa Kamal † |

Units involved
| Pakistan Armed Forces: Pakistan Army; (Pakistan) Eastern Command | 4th East Bengal Regiment: (Bangladesh) 2nd Platoon, Company "Alpha" |

Strength
| Unknown | Unknown |

Casualties and losses
| Unknown | 40 killed |

Mostafa Kamal was a sepoy of the 4th East Bengal Regiment. At the start of March, the 4th Regiment was moved from Comilla Cantonment to Brahmanbaria. After the incidents of 25 March, the 4th Regiment successfully brought Brahmanbaria under control. Under the leadership of Major Shafayat Jamil, they revolted against the Pakistani officers and formed a defense camp at Brahmanbaria. They continued fighting against the Pakistan Army and eventually arrived at Akhaura. At Akhaura, the 4th Regiment set their camp in Gangashagar and Talshahar. To avoid any unexpected attacks from the Pakistanis, the 2nd Platoon of Company Alpha was sent to Daruin village. Mostafa Kamal was one of the section commanders of the 2nd Platoon.

On 16 April, the Pakistan Army started to approach the regiment's camp. They were coming over the railway of the Comilla-Aakhaura route. The regiment also reconciled their position at Daruin. They settled on their trenches near a pond. Mostafa took the rightmost position.

On 17 April, Pakistanis opened fire. Major Shafayat Jamil strengthened his force by sending the 11th Platoon of Company Delta to Daruin. At around 12 pm, the Pakistanis attacked from the west. Another part of the Pakistan Army attacked Mukti Bahini from behind. As a result, the regiment decided to retreat from Daruin. Mostafa Kamal took the responsibility of covering for his fellow fighters. Most of the fighters retreated to a safer position as Kamal relentlessly kept firing with his light machine gun. He kept on fighting until he ran out of bullets and was surrounded. He was bayoneted to death. He, along with 20 to 40 other Mukti Bahini soldiers, was killed in this battle.

== Legacy ==
In Kamalpur, a football stadium named Bir Sherestha Shaheed Shipahi Mostafa Kamal Stadium was named after him.
