= Bhagwant Roy =

Indian politician

Member of Constituent Assembly of India
- In office 9 December 1946 – 25 January 1950
- Constituency: Patiala and East Punjab States Union

Personal details
- Born: 15 January 1917
- Died: 29 July 1978 (aged 61)

Bhagwant Roy was an Indian politician who served as Member of Constituent Assembly of India from Patiala and East Punjab States Union.

== Personal life ==
He was born on 15 January 1917 and died on 29 July 1978, at the age of 61. He has suffered imprisonment for taking part in Congress Satyagrah Movement in 1942.
