= Objectives Resolution =

Document adopted by the Constituent Assembly of Pakistan

The Objectives Resolution (Urdu: قرارداد مَقاصِد) was adopted by the Constituent Assembly of Pakistan on 12 March 1949. The resolution proclaimed that the future constitution of Pakistan would not be modeled entirely on a European pattern, but on the ideology and democratic faith of Islam. The resolution, in its entirety, has been made part of the Constitution of Pakistan under Article 2A.

Prime Minister Liaquat Ali Khan presented it in the assembly on 7 March 1949. Out of 75 members of the assembly, 21 voted for opposing it. All the amendments proposed by minority members were rejected. Consequently, all ten of them voted against it.

== Objectives Resolution ==
The Pakistani Objectives Resolution

Sovereignty over the entire Universe belongs to Allah Almighty alone and the authority which He has delegated to the state of Pakistan, through its people for being exercised within the limits prescribed by Him is a sacred trust.

1. This Constituent Assembly representing the people of Pakistan resolves to frame a constitution for the sovereign independent state of Pakistan.
2. The state shall exercise its powers and authority through the chosen representatives of the people.
3. The principles of democracy, freedom, equality, tolerance, and social justice, as enunciated by Islam, shall be fully observed.
4. The Muslims shall be enabled to order their lives in the individual and collective spheres in accordance with the teachings and requirements of Islam as set out in the Holy Quran and Sunnah.
5. Adequate provision shall be made for the minorities to freely progress and practice their religions and develop their cultures.
6. Pakistan shall be a federation and its constituent units will be autonomous.
7. Fundamental rights shall be guaranteed. They include equality of status, opportunity and before law, social, economic, and political justice, and freedom of thought, expression, belief, faith, worship, and association, subject to (the) law and public morality.
8. Adequate provisions shall be made to safeguard the legitimate interests of minorities and backward and depressed classes.
9. The independence of the judiciary shall be fully secured.
10. The integrity of the territories of the federation, its independence, and all its rights, including its sovereign rights on land, sea, and air shall be safeguarded.
11. The people of Pakistan may prosper and attain their rightful and honored place among the nations of the world and make their full contribution towards international peace and progress and the happiness of humanity.

Purportedly combining the features of both Western and Islamic democracy, it is considered one of the most important documents in the constitutional history of Pakistan. It was strongly supported by Maulana Shabbir Ahmad Usmani, Dr. Ishtiaq Hussain Qureshi, Dr. Omar Hayat Malik, Sardar Abdur Rab Nishtar, Noor Ahmad, Begum Shaista Suhrawardy Ikramullah, Muhammad Hussain and others. At the time it was passed, Liaquat Ali Khan called it "the most important occasion in the life of this country, next in importance only to the achievement of independence". However, not everyone in Pakistan had such as high praise and unbounded admiration for it.

== Criticism ==
=== Non-Muslims ===
The non-Muslim members of the constituent assembly vigorously opposed it, and all of them voted against it. Birat Chandra Mandal said that Jinnah had unequivocally said that Pakistan would be a secular state. Sris Chandra Chattopadhyaya, the Dhaka-born leader of the opposition, said in the constituent assembly on 12 March 1949:

In my conception of (the) state where people of different religions live there is no place for religion in the state. Its position must be neutral: no bias for any religion. If necessary, it should help all religions equally. No question of concession or tolerance to any religion. It smacks of an inferiority complex. The state must respect all religions: no smiling face for one and askance look to the other. The state religion is a dangerous principle. Previous instances are sufficient to warn us not to repeat the blunder. We know people were burnt alive in the name of religion. Therefore, my conception is that sovereignty must rest with the people and not with anybody else...[T]he words "equal rights as enunciated by Islam" are—I do not use any other word—a camouflage. It is only a hoax to us, non-Muslims. There cannot be equal rights as enunciated by Islam. It goes without saying that by introducing the religious question, the differences between the majority and the minority are being perpetuated, for how long, nobody knows. And, as apprehended by us, the difficulty of interpretation has already arisen. The accepted principle is that the majority, by their fair treatment, must create confidence in the minority. Whereas the Honorable mover of the resolution promises respect, in place of charity or sufferance for the minority community the deputy minister, Dr. Qureshi, advises the minority to win the goodwill of the majority through their behavior. In the House of the Legislature also we find that, while the prime minister keeps perfectly to his dictum, others cannot brook that the opposition should function in the spirit of opposition. The demand is that the opposition should remain submissive. That is Dr. Qureshi's way of thinking. The minorities must be grateful for all the benevolence they get and must never complain about the malevolence that may also be dealt out to them. That is his solution to the minority problem.

=== Muslims ===
Ayaz Amir, a prominent media commentator and a former member of Pakistan's parliament, has criticized the constituent assembly for lavishing attention on this "piece of rhetoric" which was "of no practical benefit to anyone." Even Maulana Maududi, a big supporter of the resolution, was disappointed with the fact that it did not produce any positive results. According to him, it was such a rain that was neither preceded by a gathering of clouds nor was it followed by vegetation.

According to Ms. Rubina Saigal, an eminent Pakistani intellectual, Maulana Maududi's theory of divine sovereignty was incorporated into the resolution. According to her:

Subsequent to the passage of the Objectives Resolution, all of Pakistan's constitutions contained religious provisions and the name of the country was changed from (the) Republic of Pakistan to (the) Islamic Republic of Pakistan. The national debates over the kind of nation, state, and society envisaged led to compromises being made with the liberal, secular as well as religious lobby. As a result, the Constitution of 1973, a consensus document, became riddled with internal contradictions regarding citizenship. For example, Article 25 says that all citizens are equal before the law while Article 2 says that Islam shall be the state religion. When one religion, to the exclusion of all others, is established as the state religion, how can the followers of other religions be equal citizens? And if they cannot be equal citizens, is democracy possible without citizenship equality? The denial of the right of non-Muslim citizens to become the head of state or government also violates Article 25, which requires equality before the law.

As mentioned above, the resolution is included in the Annex of the current Constitution of Pakistan by virtue of Article 2A of the Constitution.

== See also ==
- Secularism in Pakistan
