= Maulana Masoodi =

Indian politician

Maulana Muhammad Syed Masoodi (27 January 1903/1905 – 13 December 1990) was an Indian politician affiliated with the National Conference party.

He was born in Lawat, Karnah/Neelan Valley/Muzaffarabad District. He was a descendent of Khwaja Masoodi Narwari from Srinagar.

After completing his education he was appointed as a teacher. After joining the freedom struggle against the autocratic rule in J&K, he resigned and played a key role in the freedom movement and the "Quit Kashmir" struggle along with Sher I Kashmir Sheikh Mohammad Abdullah.

Masoodi also played a key role in the organisations of Plebiscite Front and the Holy Relic Movement through the action committee.

He was often referred to as Mufakir I Kashmir by his colleagues for his intellectual and political understanding of the Kashmir issue and India-Pakistan relations. He participated in key negotiations between India and Pakistan on Kashmir, and accompanied Sheikh Abdullah to Pakistan for talks on behalf of India.

He functioned as the founder general secretary of the National Conference for nearly two decades.

Masoodi also served as a member of the Maharaja Hari Singh's Praja Sabah along with Maulana Ghulam Mustafa Masoodi.

After Independence he was nominated as a member of the Constituent Assembly of India, and a member of 1st Lok Sabha.

Masoodi was elected as a member of the Constituent Assembly of Jammu and Kashmir and was nominated its interim chairman.

After the death of Sheikh Mohammad Abdullah, the J&K National Conference legislature party formally endorsed the decision of then Governor B K Nehru and elected Farooq Abdullah as chief minister of the state. Masoodi, the stalwart of the freedom movement and one-time colleague of the sheikh, was a special invitee at the legislature party meeting to endorse the decision and strengthen the leadership of Abdullah.

He was the general secretary of the Jammu and Kashmir National Conference from 1939 to 1953.

Masoodi wrote an anthem for the State of Jammu and Kashmir which was adopted in the Constituent Assembly along with the flag of J&K.

On 13 December 1990, Masoodi was assassinated by terrorists.
