= Chaudhari Hyder Husein =

Indian politician

Barrister Chaudhari Hyder Husein

Member of the Lok Sabha
- In office 1957–1952
- Preceded by: position established
- Succeeded by: Dinesh Pratap Singh
- Constituency: Gonda

Member of the Constituent Assembly of India
- In office 14 July 1947 – 24 January 1950
- Preceded by: position established
- Succeeded by: position delimited

Personal details
- Born: 24 December 1890 Garhi Bhilwal, Barabanki district, Uttar Pradesh
- Party: Indian National Congress
- Spouse: Safiah Hyder Husein (m. 1914)
- Parent: Chaudhri Ghazanfar Husein (father)
- Education: Canning College, Lucknow; St. Catherine's College, Oxford

Chaudhari Hyder Husein was an Indian politician. He was the member of Constituent Assembly of India from the United Provinces through the Indian National Congress ticket. In 1937 he was a member of the Uttar Pradesh Legislative Assembly Husein was elected as a member of the Constituent Assembly of India and. later, the Lok Sabha from 1952 to 1957, representing the Gonda Lok Sabha constituency. He was President of the Oudh Bar Association High Court Lucknow from 1966 to 1968.

== Early life and education ==
Chaudhari Hyder Husein was born at Garhi Bhilwal in Barabanki district of Uttar Pradesh on 24 December 1890. He completed his schooling from Church Mission High School, Lucknow. He studied at various colleges and universities, including M.A.O. College, Aligarh, Oxford University and Trinity College, Dublin.

== Career ==
=== Political career ===
Husein became a member of the Legislative Assembly of Uttar Pradesh in 1937. Later, he was a Member, Constituent Assembly of India and the Provisional Parliament of India.

Husein was elected to the Constituent Assembly from the United Provinces through an Indian National Congress ticket. He did not actively participate in the Assembly debates. Husein made only one speech.

=== Judicial career ===
Husein served as a senior advocate in the Supreme Court of India.

== Personal life ==
Husein married Safiah Hyder Husein on 24 November 1914; they had two sons and five daughters.

His hobby was agriculture and he was involved in many organizations and associations, including the Guardians’ Association, Madrasa-i-Qadimia; the Uttar Pradesh Branch of the National Rifle Association; Indian Council of World Affairs; and Director, British-Indian Corporation, Kanpur and Sitapur Electric Supply Company. He visited United States of America, Southern Canada, Great Britain, Ireland, France, Germany, Switzerland, Italy and Greece.
