= Nazir Ahmad Khan (cricket administrator) =

Pakistani cricket administrator and politician

Chaudhry Nazir Ahmad Khan was a Pakistani cricket administrator and politician who served as the chairman of the Board of Control for Cricket in Pakistan from March 1950 to September 1951. He was also a member of the Constituent Assembly of Pakistan and briefly served as a Central Minister of Industries.
