= Nur Ahmed (politician, born 1890) =

Bangladeshi politician

- নূর আহমদ

Member of the 1st National Assembly of Pakistan
- In office 1947–1954
- Prime Minister: Liaquat Ali Khan; Khawaja Nazimuddin; Mohammad Ali Bogra

Personal details
- Born: 25 December 1890 Chittagong, Bengal Presidency, British Raj
- Died: 22 October 1964 (aged 73) Chittagong, East Pakistan
- Party: Muslim League
- Education: Chittagong College; Chittagong Municipal Model High School
- Alma mater: University of Calcutta

Nur Ahmed (Bengali: নূর আহমদ; 25 December 1890 – 22 October 1964) was a Bengali-Pakistani lawyer and politician.

== Early life ==
Nur Ahmed was born on 25 December 1890 to a Bengali Muslim family of Qazi-Saudagars in the Alkaran mahallah of the port city of Chittagong in southeastern Bengal, British Raj. He was the son of businessman Qazi Amjad Ali Saudagar and Peyar Jan Bibi. Ahmed graduated from Chittagong Municipal Model High School and Chittagong College in 1910 and 1912 respectively. He completed his Bachelor of Arts in Arabic and Persian languages and Master of Arts in History from the University of Calcutta in 1915 and 1916 respectively. He received a law degree from the University of Calcutta in 1917. He graduated with a First Class master's degree in history in 1916 receiving the Chancellor's Gold Medal for extraordinary result. In 1917 he obtained BL degree from the same University.

== Career ==
Nur Ahmed joined the Chittagong Judges Court after his post graduation. He was elected Commissioner of Chittagong Municipality in 1918 and was elected to the Bengal Legislative Assembly from Chittagong in 1937 as a Muslim League candidate. He was also elected the Chairman of the Chittagong Municipality in 1921 and held this position till 1954, for 33 long years. As a Chairman of the Chittagong Municipality, he introduced compulsory primary education for boys in 1925 and for girls in 1928, and created the position of school inspectors to monitor and develop the primary education system. He oversaw a rise in the literacy rate of the city and increased the number of primary schools to 62. He played a pioneering role in establishing educational institutions beside providing urban facilities to the people of Chattogram. He renovated the Municipal Public Library and installed street lights in all roads of Chittagong city.

Ahmed was elected to the 1st National Assembly of Pakistan from East Pakistan as a Muslim League candidate in 1947. Though the Language Movement began in March 1948 with the visit of Mohammed Ali Jinnah to East Bengal when he declared that “Urdu shall be the only State Language of Pakistan”, the movement took a new turn with the police firing on students and demonstrating public in Dhaka on February 21, 1952, demanding Bangla be given the status of State Language of Pakistan. On April 10, 1952 the Constituent Assembly of Pakistan convened in Karachi and the day's proceedings began with a motion moved by Nur Ahmed from Chittagong. He addressed the President (Speaker, Moulvi Tamizuddin Khan) of the Assembly and said, “I move: that the Assembly is of the opinion that Bengali language shall be made the State Language of Pakistan.” (Documents of Bangladesh Liberation War, Vol-1, p. 246). He motioned the bill in the national assembly that led to the creation of the Homoeopathic Medical Board. In 1954 he retired from active politics and voluntarily abstained from running for the Chairmanship of the Municipality and devoted his time to writing. After partition in 1947 he became a member of the Constituents Assembly of Pakistan (MCA), a post he held till his retirement.

== Death ==
Ahmed died on 22 October 1964 in Chittagong, East Pakistan, Pakistan. Alkaran Nur Ahmad City Corporation High School in Chittagong was named after him.
