= Mumtaz Hasan Kizilbash =

Indian politician

Mirza Mumtaz Hasan Kizilbash was the chief-minister of Khairpur state after its accession into Pakistan, from 1947 to 1955. He was inducted as a representative of Khairpur in the Constituent Assembly of Pakistan in December 1949.
