= Harendra Kumar Sur =

Bengali politician

Harendra Kumar Sur (1893 - 3 October 1964) was an anti-colonial Bengali politician, and a representative of East Pakistan to the Constituent Assembly of Pakistan.

Sur was a lawyer by training. In the 1937 Bengal Provincial Assembly Elections, Sur filed his nomination from Noakhali from the Indian National Congress. He drubbed his opponent, an independent candidate. (Note: Sur polled 12,393 votes against 193 managed by his opponent.) He did not seek re-election to the Assembly in 1946; nonetheless, he was elected (Note: The Cabinet Mission Plan had reserved one seat in the Constitution Assembly per million people of a province. These seats were distributed among Muslims, Sikhs, and General (Hindus and others) category in proportion to their share of population in the province and were to be elected by legislators of the particular community. Bengal Province was allotted with sixty seats, of which twenty seven were reserved for General category and rest for Muslims.) by the Assembly on a Congress ticket to the Constituent Assembly of India. After partition, Noakhali went to Pakistan and Majumdar became a member of the Constituent Assembly of Pakistan. During the Noakhali riots, he opened a peace camp at Chowmuhani.

Sur died on 3 October 1964 at R. G. Kar Medical College and Hospital, Kolkata.
