= Raj Kumar Chakraverty =

Bengali politician

Raj Kumar Chakraverty was a Bengali politician from East Bengal who was the member of the 1st National Assembly of Pakistan as a representative of East Pakistan.

Chakraverty was a Member of the Constituent Assembly of Pakistan. He spoke in the assembly for a secular constitution in Pakistan.
