= Azizuddin Ahmad =

Pakistani politician (1897–1968)

- আজিজুদ্দীন আহমদ
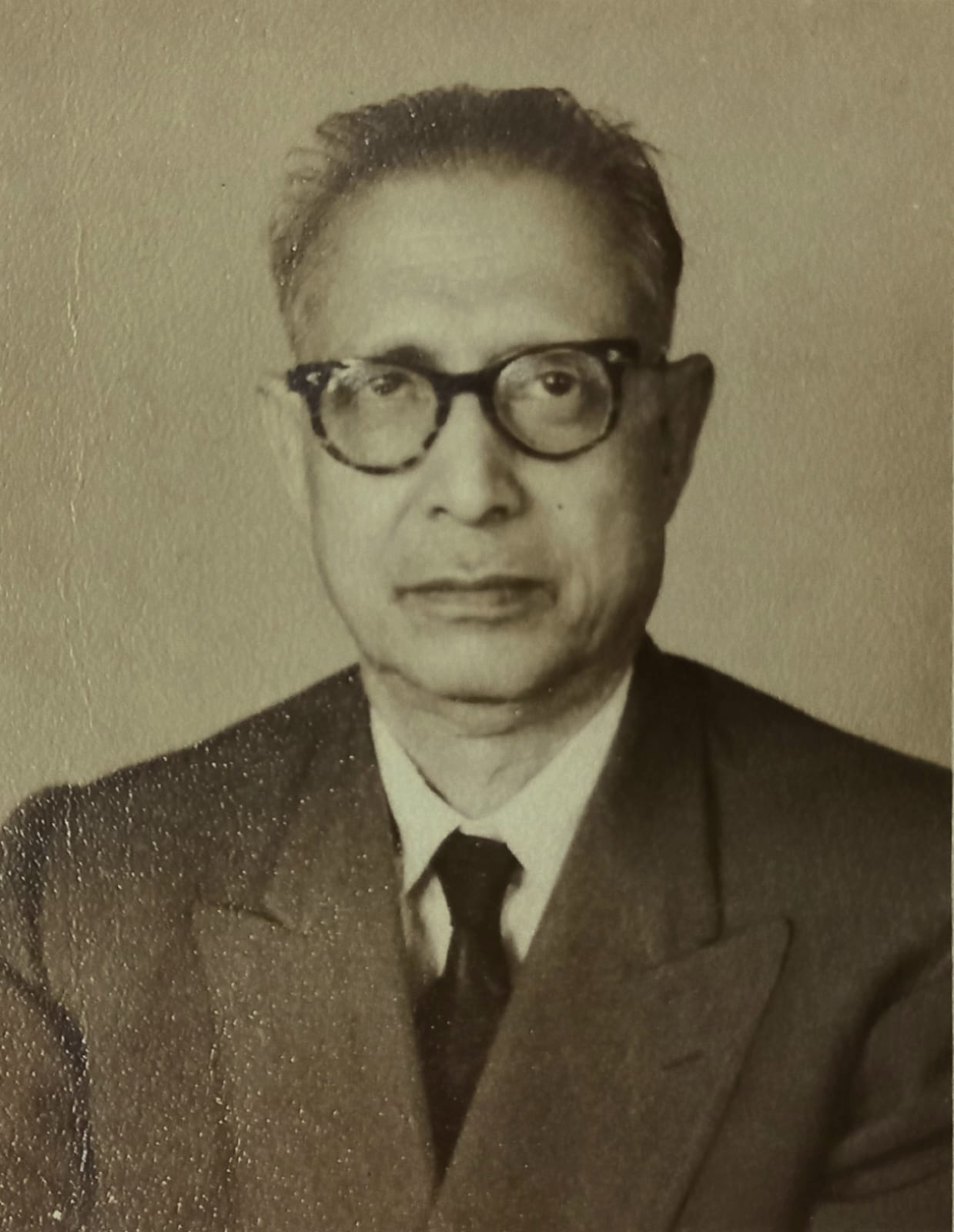

Member of the 1st National Assembly of Pakistan
- In office 1947–1954

State Minister for Minority Affairs
- In office 17 October 1951 – 17 April 1953
- Prime Minister: Khawaja Nazimuddin

Member of the 2nd National Assembly of Pakistan
- In office 1958 – 7 October 1958

Personal details
- Born: 21 February 1897 Madanpur, Bhola Island, Bakerganj District, Bengal Presidency
- Died: 10 July 1968 (aged 71)
- Party: Awami Muslim League
- Other political affiliations: Muslim League (Pakistan), All-India Muslim League
- Education: University of Dacca (BA, LLB); Aligarh Muslim University

Azizuddin Ahmad (Bengali: আজিজুদ্দীন আহমদ; 21 February 1897 – 10 July 1968) was a Pakistani politician who was a member of the first Constituent Assembly of Pakistan as a representative of East Pakistan.

== Early life and education ==
Azizuddin Ahmad was born on 21 February 1897 to a Bengali Muslim family in the village of Madanpur, Daulatkhan in Bhola Island, then a part of the Backergunge District of the Bengal Presidency. His father, Moulvi Abdul Latif, was an Islamic scholar. After receiving a first-class in his matriculation from Barisal Zilla School and was awarded the Gold Award from the University of Calcutta. He completed his Intermediate of Arts from Brojomohun College, and then enrolled at the Aligarh Muslim University in the United Provinces. He became acquainted with Mohammad Ali Jauhar during his time in Aligarh. Ahmad enrolled at the University of Dacca following its establishment in 1921 and swiftly gained influence as a student leader and public speaker. He received his Bachelor of Arts in English literature and Bachelor of Laws from the University of Dacca.

== Career ==
Ahmad began his career at the Barisal Bar in 1927 and became established within a short space of time. He was the first Muslim to be elected as the secretary of the Barisal Bar Society and the first Muslim to be elected as its president. He became the founding secretary of the Barisal District Muslim League and later served as its president. Ahmad was also a member of the Bengal Provincial Muslim League's working committee and associated with the Pakistan Movement. He was conferred the title of Khan Bahadur by the British Raj but rejected it due to being an independence activist.

Ahmad was a member of the Constituent Assembly of Pakistan and the first National Assembly of Pakistan. He was a member of the Standing Advisory Committee on Communication. In 1949, he represented Pakistan at the United Nations General Assembly and at the Commonwealth Conference. He was a member of the Central Ministry of Khawaja Nazimuddin in 1951, serving as the state minister of minority affairs until 1953.

After the Muslim League suffered a major defeat against the United Front at the 1954 East Bengal Legislative Assembly election, Ahmad boycotted the assembly session. He had left the Muslim League to join the Awami Muslim League founded by Huseyn Shaheed Suhrawardy. In 1958, he was nominated to the National Assembly of Pakistan as an Awami Muslim League candidate in a by-election. He retired from politics following the 1958 Pakistani military coup and imposition of martial law.

In 1961, he became a member of the Constitution Commission and Police Commission. Ahmad was conferred the Sitara-i-Pakistan in 1962. After serving in the Barisal Bar for over 30 years, he joined the Dacca High Court and Supreme Court in 1958.

== Personal life ==
Ahmad was married twice and had nine sons and nine daughters. His eldest son, Nuruddin al-Masud (d. 1996), was a government secretary level officer. His second son, Naziruddin Ahmed (d. 2021), was the managing director of House Building Finance Corporation and executive of various banks. His third son, Nasiruddin (d. 1990), was a district commissioner. His sixth son, Zahiruddin Ahmad was a brigadier in the Bangladesh Army who passed away in 2019.

== Death ==
Ahmad died on 10 July 1968 in East Pakistan.
