= Saudagar (surname) =

- Pronunciation: Soudagor
- Language: Bengali

Origin
- Origin: Persian
- Region of origin: Bengal

Other names
- Alternative spelling: Sawdagor, Sadagar

Saudagar (Bengali: সওদাগর), also spelt Sawdagor or Sadagar, is a Bengali surname meaning merchant. It may refer to:

- Chand Sadagar (c. 200 – c. 300), sea merchant
- Sheikh Osman Ali Sadagar (1856–1948), politician, cultivator and educationist
- Nur Ahmed Saudagar (1890–1964), politician and lawyer
- Abdul Jabbar Saudagar (fl. 1909), merchant and martial artist
- Haji Muhammad Dula Mia Saudagar (1910–2000), jeweller and Sufi
- Abdul Gani Saudagar (1926–2018), politician
- Muhammad Yunus Saudagar (born 1940), economist and civil society leader
- Muhammad Ibrahim Saudagar (born 1945), physicist and academic
- Shahid Hasan Sawdagor (born 1966), Misha Sawdagor, film actor
- Aslam Hossain Saudagar (born 1966), parliamentarian

== See also ==
- Akhand (surname)
- Biswas
- Kazi
- Khondakar
- Mridha
- Patwary
- Sikdar
