= Jnanendra Chandra Majumdar =

Pakistani politician

Jnanendra Chandra Majumdar (also Janendra Chandra Majumder) was an anti-colonial Bengali politician, and a representative of East Pakistan to the Constituent Assembly of Pakistan.

A long-time associate of Indian National Congress, Majumdar sided with Sarat Bose during the evolution of All India Forward Bloc faction. In 1940, he won a bye-election (Note: The incumbent legislator (general seat) Birendra Kishore Roy Chowdhury, a local Zamindar and musician of some repute, was promised a Congress nomination to the Legislative Assembly by the Forward Block faction and made to resign.) from East Mymensingh —a dual-member (Note: In these constituencies —surpassing a threshold percentage of Scheduled Caste (SC) voters—, all Hindu candidates were enrollable as candidates but a seat was reserved for Scheduled Caste (SC) in addition to the usual seat. Both the seats were electable through the same election under the one person, one vote system. The highest ranked SC candidate was declared winner to the "reserved" seat while whoever else polled the most (or second-most, in case the highest ranked SC candidate won the election) staked claim to the "general" seat.) rural constituency— to the Bengal Provincial Assembly, drubbing Satish Chandra Ray Chowdhuri, the official Congress candidate, with considerable organizational support from Bose. (Note: The overall episode would trigger Congress Working Committee to purge Bose.)

In 1946, Majumdar re-stood as an independent candidate, but failed (Note: Amulya Ranjan Adhikary, a Congress candidate, came first, polling 43,678 votes and won the general seat. Prafulla Ranjan Sarkar, another Congress candidate, came second (but first among SCs), polling 32,207 votes and won the reserved seat. Majumdar managed a paltry 308 votes.) to be re-elected; nonetheless, he was elected (Note: The Cabinet Mission Plan had reserved one seat in the Constitution Assembly per million people of a province. These seats were distributed among Muslims, Sikhs, and General (Hindus and others) category in proportion to their share of population in the province and were to be elected by legislators of the particular community. Bengal Province was allotted with sixty seats, of which twenty seven were reserved for General category and rest for Muslims.) by the Assembly as a Congress candidate to the Constituent Assembly of India. After partition, Mymensingh went to Pakistan and Majumdar became a member of the Constituent Assembly of Pakistan.
