= Krishna Chandra Sharma =

Indian radio broadcaster and author

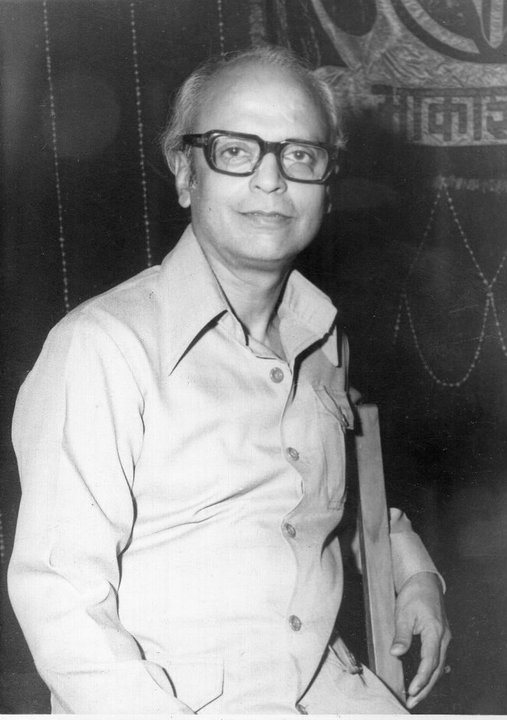
KC Sharma was DG All India Radio

Krishna Chandra Sharma, also known as Bhikkhu (12 October 1923 – 29 September 2003), was an Indian radio broadcaster and author. He was the Director General of All India Radio from 1980 to 1981. He was a noted novelist and wrote over twenty literary works in his lifetime.

== Early life ==
Sharma was born on 12 October 1923 in Kankhal, Haridwar, India. He completed his primary education there. As part of this education he studied Hindi literature in Banaras. His teachers included Ram Chandra Shukla, Nand Dulare Bajpai, Keshav Prasad Mishra, Jagannath Sharma and Hazari Prasad Dwivedi. He studied Buddhism and Pali and completed his BA, MA, and LLB at Banaras Hindu University.

Nand Dulare Bajpai encouraged him to write and patiently read all that he had written during the week.

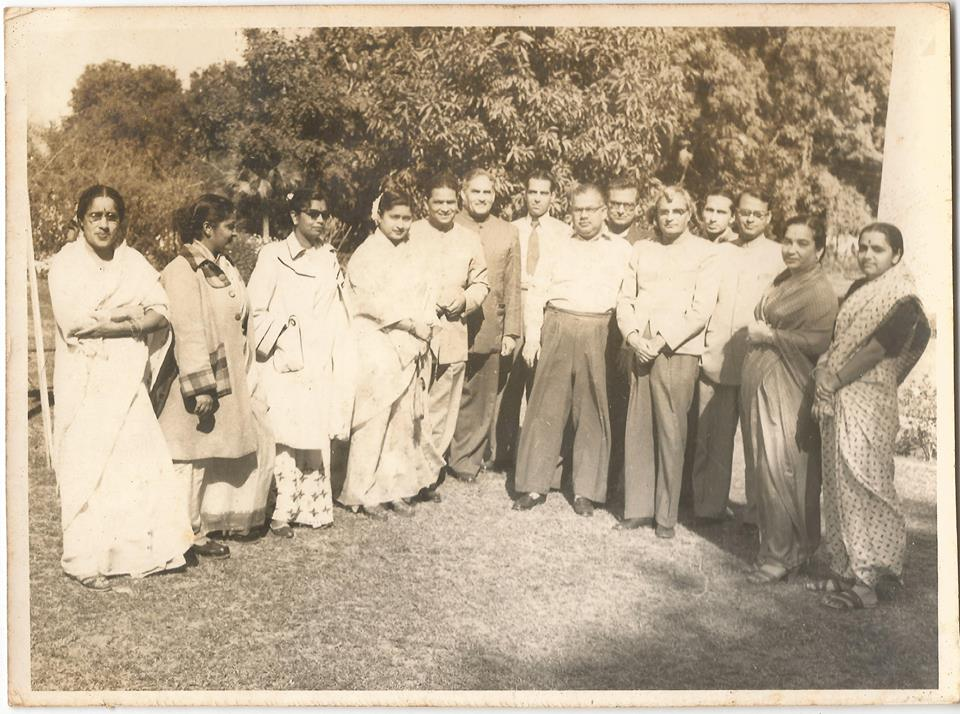
At Allahabad radio station 1955 (Left from right)

He married Shakuntala Sharma in 1953. They have one daughter Shubhra Sharma.

=== Death ===
Sharma died of brain hemorrhage on 29 September 2003.

== Career ==
He joined AIR as a program executive in the 1950s and rose to the highest post as the Director General.

== Literary works ==
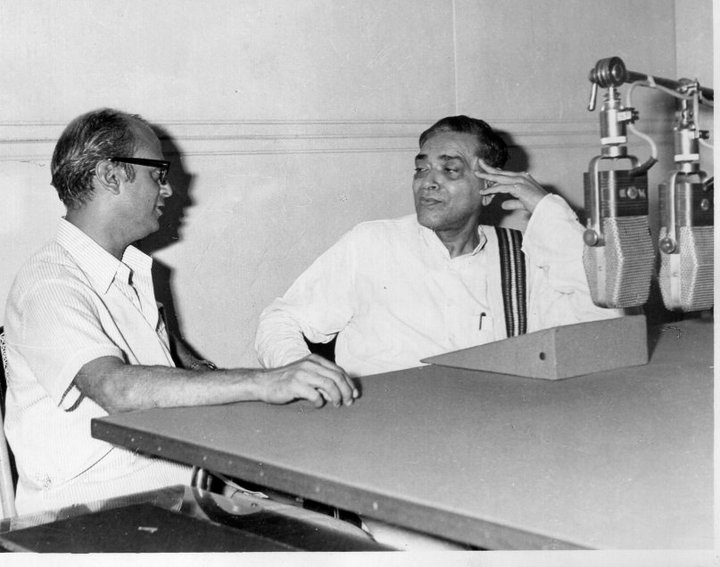
KC Sharma in conversation with notable poet Ramdhari Singh 'Dinkar'

Naag Phani, Revati and Chandanvan Ki Aag, these were the first hindi language trilogy which Sharma wrote trilogy. His novel, Maut Ki Sarai was based on the story of Marie Antoinette and the French Revolution.

- Admi Ka Bachcha
- Ghar Ka Bada
- Sankranti
- Bhanwar Jaal
- Mrityu Ki Minaar (short story collection)
- Roop Lakshmi (play)
- Sone Ka Mrig
- Naag Phani (trilogy part one)
- Som Devta Ki Ghati (durva)
- Maha Shraman Sune
- Kala Paththar (collection of short stories)
- Astangata
- Revati (trilogy part two)
- Lal Dhaang
- Maut Ki Sarai
- Yogmaya
- Chandanvan Ki Aag (trilogy part three)
- Rakt Yatra
- Ek Aur Yayati
- Bela Phule Aadhi Raat (collection of short stories)
- Kadachit
- Tathapi

== Awards ==
In 1997, Sharma was recognised by the Delhi Sahitya Akademi, India's national academy of letters. He also received the Shalaka Samman, the highest award of the Hindi Academy.
