= Abdul Basher Mahmood Hussain =

Abdul Basher Mahmood Hussain was a Bengali politician from Dacca and a member of the 1st Constituent Assembly of Pakistan. He was elected to the 1st Constituent Assembly of Pakistan in July 1949. He was a member of the Federal Public Accounts Committee in Pakistan.
