= Sris Chandra Chattopadhyaya =

Bengali civil servant and politician (1873–1967)

Srisachandra Chattopadhyay
- Born: September 11, 1873; Churain, Dhaka, Bengal Presidency, British India (now Dhaka District, Bangladesh)
- Died: ?, 1966; India
- Movement: Quit India Movement, Nationalist Movement

Sris Chandra Chattopadhyaya (1873 – 1967) was a Bengali civil servant and politician from East Bengal. He was a Member of the 1st National Assembly of Pakistan as a representative of East Pakistan. He was born in Dhaka.

== Career ==
Chattopadhyaya was a member of the Constituent Assembly of Pakistan. He had argued for a secular Pakistan in the constituent assembly. He was opposed to the passing of the Objectives Resolution of 1949.
