= Abdus Sattar Abdur Rahman =

Pakistani politician

Pirzada Abdus Sattar Abdur Rahman was the Minister for Law and Justice in Pakistan from 1951 to 1953, and one of the three representatives from Sindh to the Constituent Assembly of Pakistan. A far-right conservative, he frequently denounced liberal members of the house as enemies of the state.
