= Birat Chandra Mandal =

Politician and depressed class leader from East Bengal

Birat Chandra Mandal was a member of the 1st National Assembly of Pakistan as a representative of East Pakistan. He had argued for the constitution of Pakistan to be secular.

== Career ==
Mandal represented Bengal Depressed Classes Association at the All India Depressed Classes Association meeting at Shimla in 1930. He supported the creation of separate electorates for low caste and high caste Hindus.

Mandal argued that Mohmmad Ali Jinah had said Pakistan would be a secular state. On 9 March 1949, he was made the law and labour minister of Pakistan. He was a Member of the Constituent Assembly of Pakistan.

== Death ==
Mandal died on 5 October 1964 in Kolkata, West Bengal.
