= Kheshgi =

Sarbani Pashtun tribe found in South Asia

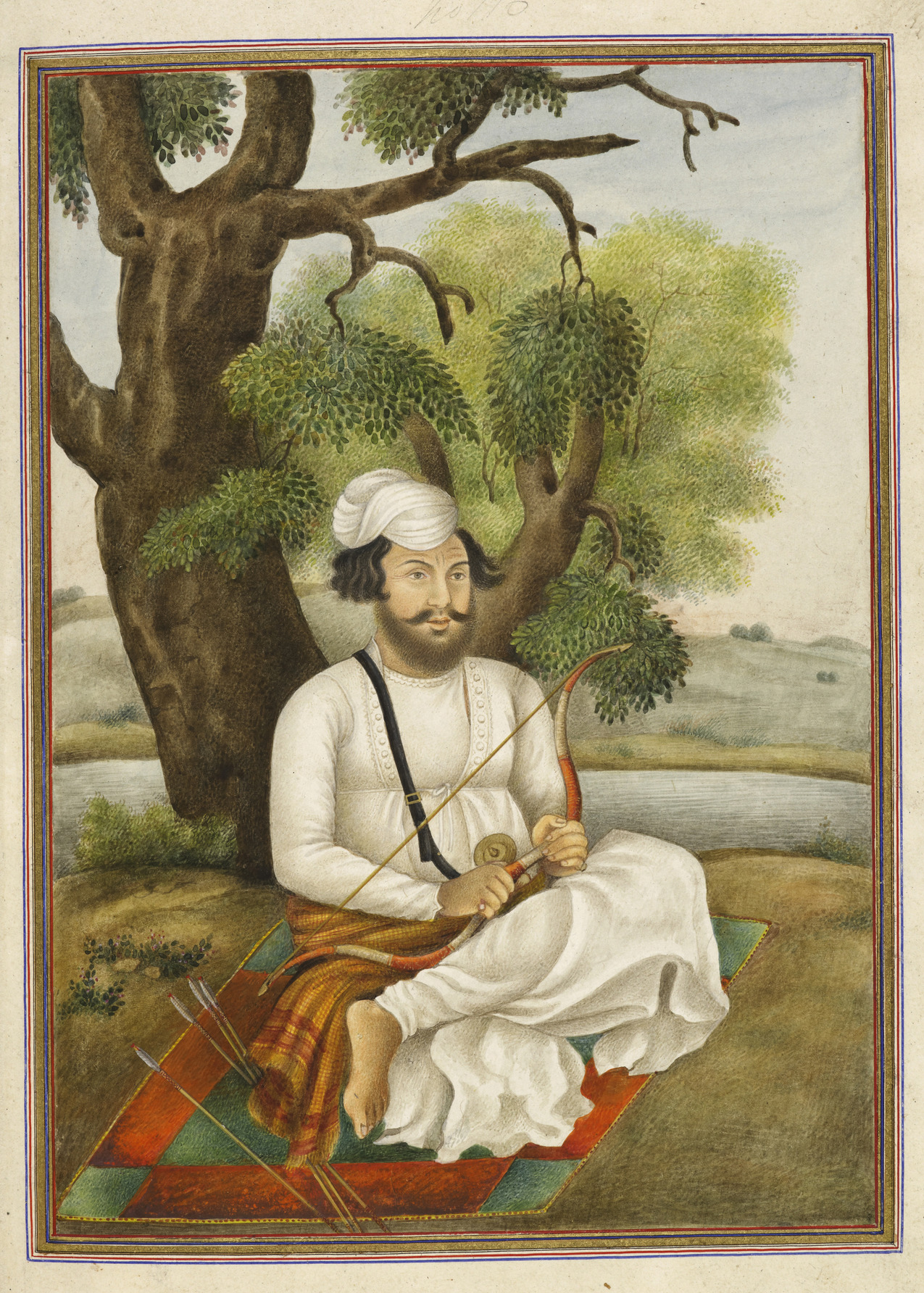
- A member of Kheshgi tribe from Kasur, painted 1825.
- Current region: South Asia (mainly Pakistan, Afghanistan and India)
- Etymology: Kheshgi is derived from their ancestors' name, Kheshig, which in Mongolian means: "favored", "blessed", "glorified"
- Origin: Keshik, Kerman Province, Mongol Empire
- Founded: Early 1400s
- Titles: Nawab of Kasur (1525); Nawab of Mamdot (1848)

The Kheshgi or Khaishgi (Pashto: خیشکی) is a Pashtun tribe in South Asia, mainly in Pakistan, Afghanistan and India.

== Origins ==
The Kheshgi are believed to be descendants of the Kheshig, the Mongol imperial guards who originated in the surrounding areas of modern Zamand and Keshik in Iran.

== Notable people ==
- Zakir Husain, third President of India
- Nawab Hussain Khan Kheshgi, founder of the city of Kasur (now in Pakistan)
- Waliullah Kheshgi, Pakistani diplomat
- Mahmood Hasan Khan, Indian member of parliament
- Ahmad Raza Khan Kasuri, lawyer, politician, founder of multinational law firm Kasuri PLLC
- Haji Bahadar Ali Abdullah Shah, Sufi saint
- Sahabzada Yaqub Ali Khan, Pakistani retired military general and diplomat
- General Rahmuddin Khan, retired four-star general of the Pakistan Army, former Chairman Joint Chiefs of Staff Committee, 7th Governor of Balochistan, 16th Governor of Sindh
- Nawab Muzaffar Khan Khaishgi, founder of Muzaffargarh, Governor of Multan
- Nawab Jamaluddin Khan Kheshgi, founder of Mamdot
- Khurshid Mahmud Kasuri, former Pakistani Foreign Minister
- Fayaz Khan Kheshgi, Pakistani musician
- Nawab Muhammad Ahmed Khan Kasuri, former Nawab of Kasur
- Senain Kheshgi, film director, writer and producer
- Mohammad Iqbal Azizi, Afghan governor
- Nawab Sir Shahnawaz Khan Mamdot, politician, Punjabi landlord
- Asma Mamdot, Pakistani politician
- Mahmud Husain, Pakistani educationist, former Minister of Education, Minister of State for States and Frontier Regions, Deputy Minister of Defense, Foreign Affairs and Finance
- Masud Husain Khan, Indian linguist
- Salman Khurshid Alam, Indian politician
- Yousuf Hussain Khan, Indian historian, scholar, educationist, critic and author
- Nawab Iftikhar Hussain Khan Mamdot, former chief minister of West Punjab and former governor of Sindh
