= Keshik =

Keshik may refer to:

- Kheshig, imperial guards of the Mongolian Empire
- Keshik, Kerman, a village in Iran

== See also ==
- Kashyyyk, planet in the Star Wars universe and home planet of Chewbacca
