= Asma Mamdot =

Pakistani politician

Member of the National Assembly of Pakistan
- In office 3 June 2013 – 31 May 2018
- Constituency: Reserved seat for women

Personal details
- Born: Lahore
- Party: Pakistan Muslim League (N)
- Other political affiliations: Pakistan Muslim League (F)
- Relatives: Shahnawaz Khan Mamdot (grandfather)

Asma Mamdot is a Pakistani politician who was a member of the National Assembly of Pakistan from June 2013 to May 2018.

== Early life and education ==
She was born in Lahore into the Nawab family of the Mamdots, who were ethnic Kheshgi Afghans. She is a medical doctor by profession and completed her MBBS from King Edward Medical University.

== Political career ==
She was elected to the Provincial Assembly of the Punjab as a candidate of Pakistan Muslim League (F) (PML-F) on a reserved seat for women in the 2008 Pakistani general election.

In February 2013, she joined Pakistan Peoples Party and only a month later joined Pakistan Muslim League (N) (PML-N).

She was elected to the National Assembly of Pakistan as a candidate of PML-N on a reserved seat for women from Punjab in the 2013 Pakistani general election.

== Family ==
She belongs from notable political family of Mamdots and Legharis. She is a granddaughter of Shahnawaz Khan Mamdot.
