= Mian Kifait Ali =

Major Mian Kifait Ali
- میاں کفایت علی
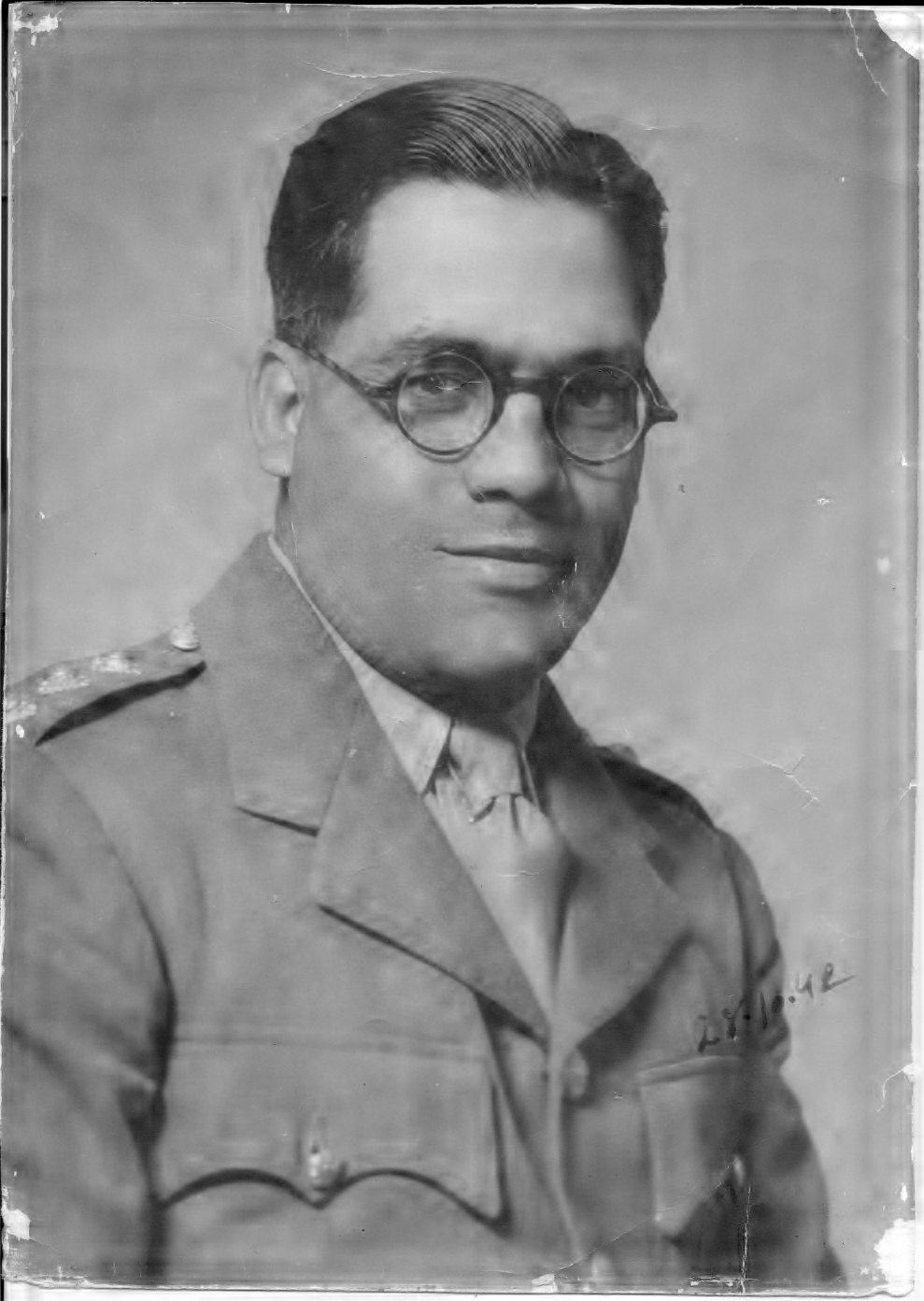
- Born: July 1902; Batala, Gurdaspur district, Punjab, British India
- Died: 1 December 1994 (aged 92); Delaware, United States
- Resting place: Lahore, Pakistan
- Occupations: Civil servant, political writer, military officer
- Notable work: "Confederacy of India" (1939)

Mian Kifait Ali (میاں کفایت علی, also romanised Kifayat or Kifayet ʿAlī; July 1902 – 1 December 1994) was a Pakistani civil servant, political writer, and military officer. Writing under the pen name A Punjabi (Urdu: اِیک پنجابی, Ik Punjābī), he authored Confederacy of India (Lahore, 1939), a detailed constitutional, geographic, and economic blueprint proposing the division of British India into five sovereign regional federations. Originally titled Pakistan until Muhammad Ali Jinnah personally directed that the title be changed before publication, the work stands as one of the most technically specific schemes to precede the Lahore Resolution of March 1940. By the late 1940s, Ali began writing under his own name, continuing to apply technical analysis to the major constitutional questions facing the new Pakistani state. While his early pseudonymous authorship was known to some contemporaries in Muslim League circles, his identity as the author remained obscure in scholarly literature for decades until the historian K.K. Aziz formally revealed "A Punjabi" as Mian Kifait Ali in his study A History of the Idea of Pakistan (1987).

== Early life and career ==
Mian Kifait Ali was born in July 1902 into a Rajput Muslim family in Batala, Gurdaspur district, in the Punjab province of British India (now in the state of Punjab, India). His father, Mian Himait Ali, held the position of tehsildar (revenue officer) in the Punjab civil service. After completing his B.A. degree at Islamia College, Lahore, he enrolled at the Law College in the same city. The death of his father in 1923 compelled him to abandon his legal studies; as the eldest son, he assumed responsibility for raising and educating his younger siblings.

He secured a position in the office of the Punjab Legislative Council, where his duties brought him into proximity with the debates and personalities of Punjab's political establishment. Through his father's first cousin, Sir Fazl-i-Hussain, the co-founder of the Punjab Unionist Party, he gained early exposure to the mechanics of provincial governance and the Muslim political question.

While working as a civil servant, Kifait Ali began contributing articles to Muslim newspapers under the pseudonym "A Punjabi" (Urdu: اِیک پنجابی, Ik Punjābī). His first sustained political work, ہندوستان اور ملیت (Hindustan aur Milliyat, "India and Nationhood"), was published in Lahore in 1936. The book, written in Urdu, developed a thesis on the nature of nationalism and examined the question of a common nationhood between Hindus and Muslims in a future independent India.

From 1936 to 1942 he wrote seven books and pamphlets and contributed a number of articles to The New Times of Malik Barkat Ali, and Lahore Weekly. Some of Ali's work was featured in Monday Morning, edited jointly by Freda Bedi and B.P.L. Bedi.

Ali was married to Suraiya Jabeen. They were introduced by her aunt Fatima Bibi, the eldest daughter of Mahboob Alam, the founder of the daily newspaper پیسہ اخبار (Paisā Akhbār).

He was influenced by the ideas of Muhammad Iqbal, the debates of Punjab Legislative Council, his close association with his colleague Harichand Akhtar and Sir Fazl-i-Hussain. Kifait Ali has described Choudhry Rahmat Ali, who had coined the word "Pakistan" in Cambridge in 1933, as an influence: "The idea was suggested to me by the late Choudhry Rahmat Ali's writings and I developed it to an extent to which no one had done earlier."

== Confederacy of India (1939) ==
=== Background and genesis ===
By the late 1930s, the All-India Muslim League under Jinnah's leadership had emerged as the principal vehicle for Muslim political aspirations, but had not yet committed to a specific constitutional scheme. The Government of India Act 1935 had created provincial autonomy without resolving the structural position of Muslim minorities at the centre of any future federal India. Following Congress victories in the 1937 provincial elections, Muslim anxieties about permanent minority status intensified, spurring a wave of constitutional proposals from individuals and bodies across the subcontinent.

Kifait Ali had been developing his scheme since at least 1935. The Allahabad Address of 1930, in which Muhammad Iqbal proposed an autonomous Muslim bloc in northwestern India, provided one starting point; Rahmat Ali's "Now or Never" pamphlet (1933), which projected a Muslim state called "Pakistan" carved from India's northwest, provided another. Kifait Ali acknowledged the recently deceased Iqbal directly, including an epigraph from Iqbal's 1927 work زبور عجم (Zabur-e-Ajam, "Persian Psalms"):

گفتند جهان ما، آیا بتو می‌سازد؟ گفتم که نمی‌سازد گفتند که برهم زن!

("They asked: 'Does our world suit you?' I said: 'It does not suit.' They said: 'Then overturn it!'")

The draft was completed in the third quarter of 1938. Seeking funds for its publication and free distribution, Kifait Ali approached two prominent Muslim League figures: Haji Sir Abdullah Haroon, the Sind Muslim League leader, and Nawab Sir Shahnawaz Khan of Mamdot, the leading Muslim League figure in Punjab and a trusted associate of Jinnah's. Both offered to bear the cost; the offer of the Nawab of Mamdot was accepted.

=== The Industan scheme ===
The Confederacy of India proposed the division of British India into five independent and sovereign federations, to be linked by a loose confederal centre in which, Kifait Ali proposed, authority could be vested in the Viceroy. The work ran to 272 pages with a preface (xiii), two internal maps, and an appendix titled "Programme" (pp. 267–272) setting out a practical action plan. It was published under the series title Pro Patria. The five proposed federations were:

1. Indusstan — comprising Punjab (minus its eastern Hindu-majority tracts, specifically Ambala Division), Sind, Baluchistan, the North-West Frontier Province, and Kashmir. The name "Indusstan" was derived from the river Indus, as Kifait Ali explicitly noted; the scheme deliberately avoided the word "Pakistan" as connoting a purely separatist agenda. His calculations placed the total area of Indusstan at approximately 398,000 square miles, with a population of some 33 million, of whom he estimated approximately 82% were Muslim, 8% Hindu, and 6% Sikh.
2. Hindu India Federation — comprising all territories not assigned to other federations, covering the Hindi-speaking heartland.
3. Rajistan Federation — comprising Rajputana and Central India.
4. Deccan States Federation — comprising the princely states of Hyderabad and Mysore.
5. Bengal Federation — comprising Bengal and Assam, excluding their Hindu-majority districts, with a projected total area of approximately 70,000 square miles and a population of some 31 million, of whom approximately 20.5 million were Muslim.

The scheme's economic argument was developed in detail. Kifait Ali contended that in northwestern India, economic life, including agricultural production, rural employment, and access to credit was structured along communal lines: "In the north-west, the Hindus are the capitalists and the Muslims wage earners. The interests of the Muslims are mainly agricultural and those of the Hindus mainly industrial and commercial."

On the geographic boundaries of Indusstan, Kifait Ali offered unusual specificity. He identified Ambala Division as requiring exclusion from the Muslim federation, proposing a boundary running through central Punjab at the sub-district level, in some areas down to the tehsil. He acknowledged the difficulty of dividing Punjab, calling it the "'Ulster' of India", and discussed several boundary options including a line along the Jumna River or along existing administrative divisions. He also engaged with the practical implications of partition for communally shared infrastructure, acknowledging the importance to Muslims of Mughal structures such as the Red Fort in Delhi and the Taj Mahal in Agra, but concluding it was preferable to leave these within Indian territory rather than incorporate the large Hindu minority populations that would accompany them.

The scheme was consciously framed as a defensive, not aggressive, proposition. As Kifait Ali wrote: "The scheme of confederacy is based on the principle of separation, yet it avoids the disintegration of India. It is a defensive measure." He insisted the plan was practical despite its novelty: "this idea of a binational, trilingual and quinquepartite confederation, may be novel and unprecedented in history but it is not impractical."

=== Publication and the Jinnah directive ===
The manuscript was originally submitted to the Ripon Printing Press in Lahore under the title Pakistan. A copy was simultaneously sent to Jinnah in Bombay for approval. Jinnah telegraphed that the book should not be published under the name "Pakistan", a term he judged politically premature and likely to antagonise non-Muslim audiences and potentially fracture the Muslim League coalition. As Kifait Ali later recounted: "Just to give it another name, I prepared an outline of a confederal constitutional scheme for the sub-continent and incorporated it in the introduction to the book. Hence the name 'Confederacy of India'." The term "Indusstan" was introduced throughout the text as a deliberate alternative to "Pakistan" — signalling, as the introduction stated, that "our destiny lies within India and not out of it." The Nawab of Mamdot's covering letter, dated 2 July 1939, is preserved among the private papers of K.K. Aziz. The book was printed with a complimentary slip from the Nawab tipped onto the title page. Four thousand copies were printed for free distribution; one thousand copies were produced on superior paper for sale. In recognition of the work, Kifait Ali was invited in February 1940 to serve on a sub-committee presided over by Haji Sir Abdullah Haroon, convened under the Foreign Sub-committee of the All-India Muslim League to examine existing constitutional schemes for India and to determine whether a consolidated scheme could be framed. The Lahore Resolution was passed the following month, on 23 March 1940.

=== Reception and contemporary engagement ===
Confederacy of India received coverage in leading newspapers and journals. Rajendra Prasad, then President of the Indian National Congress for the second time, later the First President of India, engaged directly with specific analytical attention to the scheme in his book India Divided (Bombay: Hind Kitabs, 1946), which systematically analysed and critiqued proposals for partition. His objections to the Confederacy of India were substantive and geographic: he argued that the proposed Hindu Federation "comprises fewer than six regions separated each from others by other federations intervening... several tracts are torn from their natural surroundings and tacked on to others from which they are separated from long distances."

Mushtaq Ahmed Gurmani, who served as Governor of Punjab and later as the first Governor of West Pakistan, wrote, "Mian Kifait Ali has done pioneering work in the evolution of Muslim political thought and has suffered the hardships of a pioneer.. He will find an honourable place among the pioneers and selfless workers in this great field of Muslim national reconstruction." Nawab Iftikhar Hussain Khan of Mamdot, son of the book's patron, Nawab Sir Shahnawaz Khan of Mamdot, later credit Ali by name and described Confederacy of India as "a landmark in the history of Pakistan." A substantive scholarly review appeared in ترجمان القرآن (Tarjamān-ul-Qurʾān), the journal of Maulana Abul Ala Maududi.

=== Scholarly significance ===
The historian Ayesha Jalal, in The Sole Spokesman: Jinnah, the Muslim League and the Demand for Pakistan (Cambridge, 1985), noted the Industan scheme among the constitutional alternatives circulating in Punjab in 1939. Historian R.J. Moore, in his study of Jinnah's constitutional strategy, analysed the range of constitutional schemes circulating in 1939 Punjab, locating the Confederacy of India within the set of specific proposals considered by Muslim League leadership in the run-up to the Lahore Resolution. Other historians, such as Farooq Ahmad Dar, have cited the same.

Waheed-uz-Zaman, in Towards Pakistan (Lahore: Publishers United, 1964), assessed the relationship between the scheme and the eventual Lahore Resolution: "the solution proposed in the Confederacy of India differed but little from that proposed by the Muslim League in March 1940. The veneer of a 'Confederacy', which was the main theme of his scheme, could any time be set aside and the remainder would have precisely... Pakistan."

As late as 1964, however, the author's identity remained unknown; Waheed-uz-Zaman's own bibliography for the Confederacy of India carries the notation "author not identified." The work continued to circulate in the scholarly literature under the pseudonym alone.

The definitive scholarly identification of "A Punjabi" as Mian Kifait Ali was made by Khurshid Kamal Aziz in 1987, who devoted approximately fifty pages of A History of the Idea of Pakistan (Vol. 2, pp. 488–537) to a summary and analysis of the book's arguments, praising the proposal for its "uncommon realism" and noting that it spelled out "to the smallest detail the areas demarcated for the Muslim nation."

== Later life and career ==
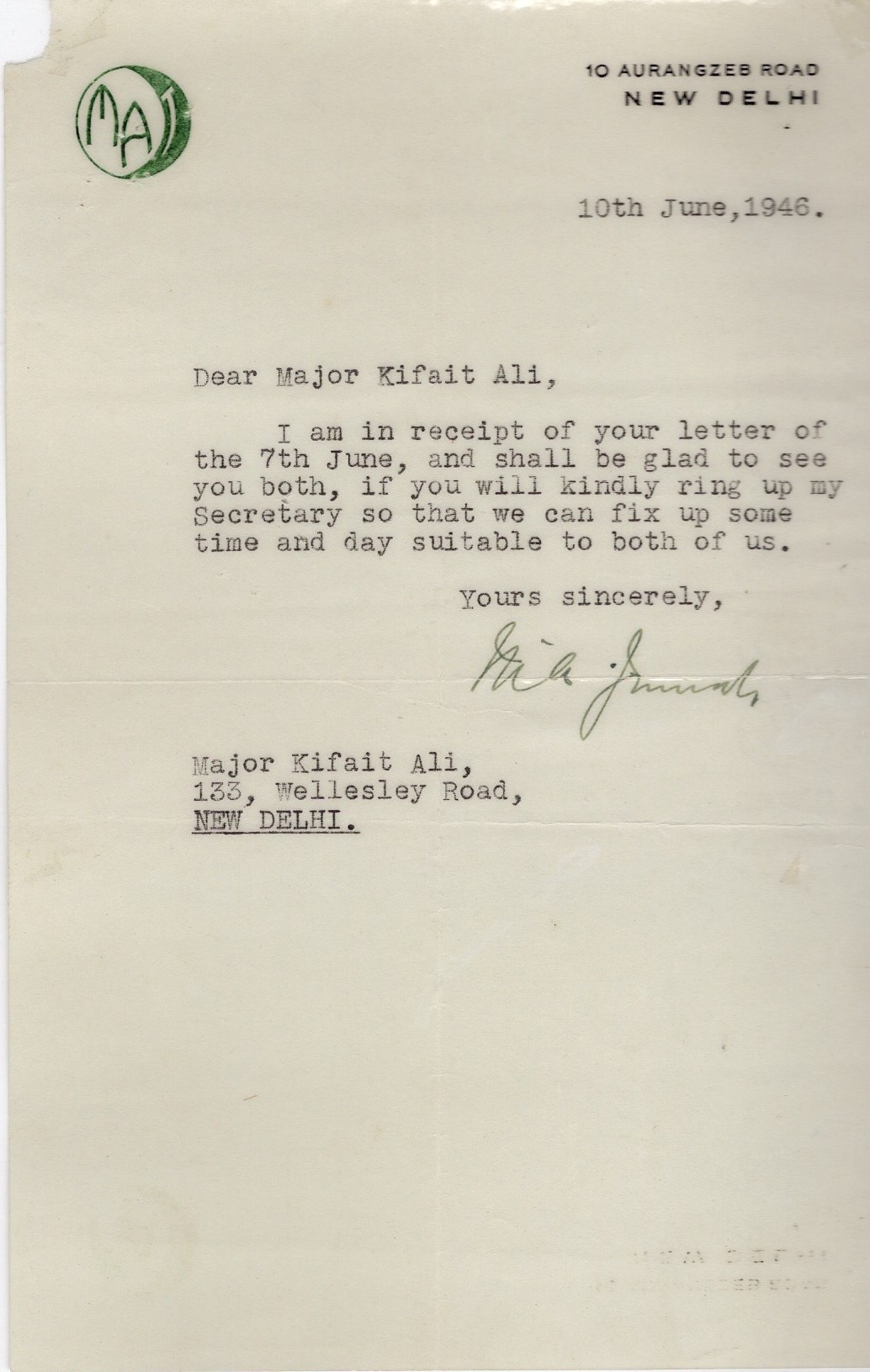
Quaid-e-Azam's letter to Mian Kifait Ali

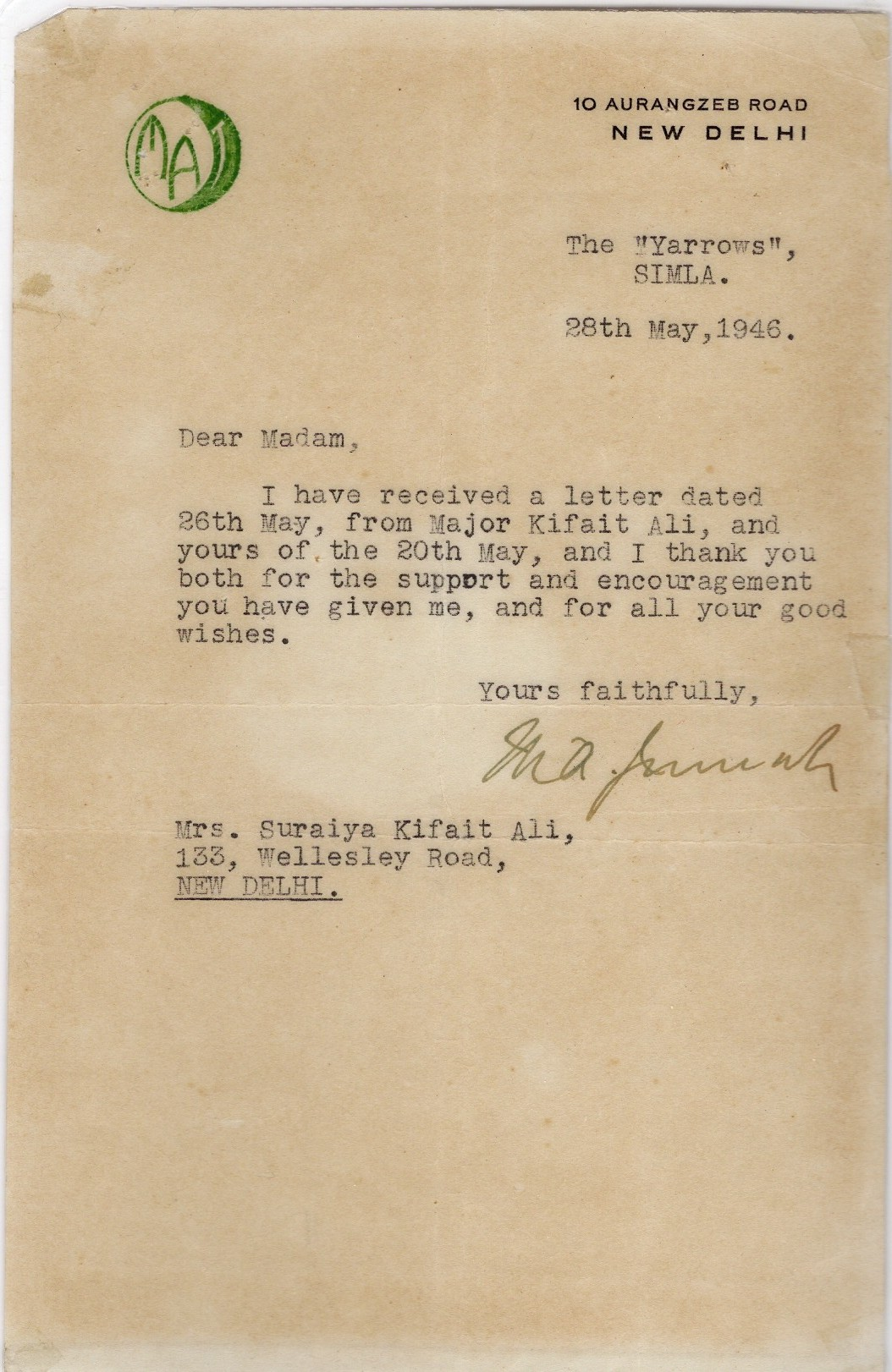
Quaid-e-Azam's letter to Mrs Ali

=== Military service ===
Following the outbreak of the Second World War, Kifait Ali received a commission as a Second Lieutenant in the British Indian Army in 1940 and was assigned to the Inter-Services Public Relations (ISPR) directorate at military headquarters in New Delhi, eventually rising to the rank of Major. He remained in touch with Muhammad Ali Jinnah in the years leading up to partition.

=== Post-partition political writing ===
==== One Unit scheme ====
After leaving the army, Kifait Ali returned to political writing, now engaging with the constitutional questions of the new Pakistani state. In 1955, the One Unit scheme, the administrative consolidation of all of West Pakistan's provinces into a single unit, moved toward enactment under Prime Minister Chaudhry Muhammad Ali, who was one of Kifait Ali's friends at Islamia College. Kifait Ali published a series of five pamphlets in English arguing in favour of the scheme: West Pakistan, One Unit Scheme, Pakistan in Retrospect and Prospect, Consolidation of West Pakistan, and Financial Advantage of One Unit. Accompanying Urdu pamphlets included مغربی پاکستان (Mughrabi Pakistan) and وحدتِ نظامِ حکومت (Wahdat-i-Nizam-i-Hukumat). He also contributed to the administrative preparation of the One Unit scheme through pamphlets on its political and administrative dimensions. His preoccupation throughout this period was the constitutional tension between the Lahore Resolution of 1940, which he had known and influenced, and the Delhi Resolution of 1946, which he believed had introduced an ambiguity into the separation process that carried long-term dangers for Pakistani unity.

==== Six Points movement ====
As early as 1953, according to the biographical record, Kifait Ali wrote a full article on the constitutional incorporation of Pakistan's two wings and the dangers of East Pakistan's political isolation, a concern that proved prescient eighteen years later. In 1967, as Sheikh Mujibur Rahman's Six Points Movement gathered momentum in East Pakistan, he published Six Point Formulae X-Rayed (also issued in Bengali translation), offering a critical analysis of the demand for East Pakistani autonomy and its implications for federal structure. His final major publication, Pakistan vs. Bangla Desh (1971), appeared as the political crisis reached its conclusion with the Bangladesh Liberation War and the creation of Bangladesh.

== Selected works ==
- ہندوستان اور دیگر افسانے (Hindustan Aur Deegar Afsanay, "Hindustan and Other Stories")
- ہندوستان اور ملیت (Hindustan aur Milliyat, "India and Nationhood") (Lahore, 1936) [Urdu; published under pen name اِیک پنجابی]
- Confederacy of India (Lahore: Nawab Sir Muhammad Shah Nawaz Khan of Mamdot / Ripon Printing Press, 1939) [English; published under pen name "A Punjabi"]
- Pakistan [Urdu pamphlet] (1939)
- Pakistan: The Critics' Case Examined [English pamphlet] (1941)
- Separation: A Reply to Its Critics [English pamphlet] (1940)
- Separation, Socialism and Islam [English pamphlet] (1942)
- Sir Sikandar's Scheme Under Searchlight [English pamphlet] (1942)
- Constitution of Hari Sari Party [Urdu and English pamphlet] (1949)
- West Pakistan — Its Political and Administrative Integration [English pamphlet] (1955)
- One Unit Scheme [English pamphlet] (1955)
- Pakistan in Retrospect and Prospect [English pamphlet] (1955)
- Consolidation of West Pakistan [English pamphlet] (1955)
- Financial Advantage of One Unit [English pamphlet] (1955)
- مغربی پاکستان (Mughrabi Pakistan) [Urdu pamphlet] (1955)
- وحدتِ نظامِ حکومت (Wahdat-i-Nizam-i-Hukumat) [Urdu pamphlet] (1955)
- Six Point Formulae X-Rayed [English pamphlet, also published in Bengali] (1967)
- Pakistan vs. Bangla Desh [English pamphlet] (1971)
- "A Review of the States Re-organization Commission (India) 1955" [English pamphlet] (1956)
- "Pakistan's Defense Potential and Security Problems" [English pamphlet] (1956)
- "Political Background of Pakistan and its Provinces" [English pamphlet] (1956)
- "Transfer of an Evacuee Property" [English pamphlet] (1964)
