= Zain ul Abadeen Gillani =

Zain ul Abadeen Gillani (1885-1960) also Syed Zain ul Abideen Gilani was a member of the Pakistan Movement. He belonged to the respectable Gillani family of Multan, where he was born and educated. After the completion of his education, he was appointed as a Revenue officer in Sujah Abad. He resigned his job to participate in the Khilafat Movement, donated all his belongings to it and was elected to its main governing body. Syed Zain Ul Abidin Shah Gillani was one of the very early members of Pakistan Muslim League Multan. He was one of the very close members of Quaid e Azam Muhammad Ali Jinnah. He played a significant role in winning seats for Muslim league in Multan. He faced contravention by his own relatives despite this he continuously struggled and founded Anjuman Tehreek e fidayaan an Islam. This organization was very operative and pragmatic and actively played a stunning role during elections. Gillani always addressed the people of Multan in Wali Muhammad Mosque. He was a leading member of Anjuman Fidayeen-e-Islam. He played important roles in the Kashmir Movement, Pakistan Movement and Tehrik e Ittehad e Milat. He participated in the historical Lahore convocation in 1940, where he was embraced by Quaid-e-Azam Muhammad Ali Jinnah when his achievements were mentioned in front him. Jinnah appointed him as a member of All-India Muslim League. He played an important role in the establishment of the Muslim League in Multan. He was elected as the President of Multan Muslim League. In 1927, he established daily "Tarjuman", in which he wrote an article against the British and was jailed for one month due to it. In 1931, he established Anjuman Fidayeen-e-Islam in Multan and continued his strive against the British. On 3 March 1947, he raised Pakistan flag on commissioner office and municipality buildings in Multan. Muhammad Ali Jinnah awarded him the title of Great man. He died on 8 October 1960. He was awarded a gold medal in 1989 for his achievements in Pakistan Movement by Punjab Government. His son Syed Shamim Mehdi Shah Gillani never stepped in politics and he died on 6 August 2000 so politics also ended in this Gillani family.
