= Minar-e-Pakistan =

Monument in Lahore, Pakistan

- مینارِ پاکستان
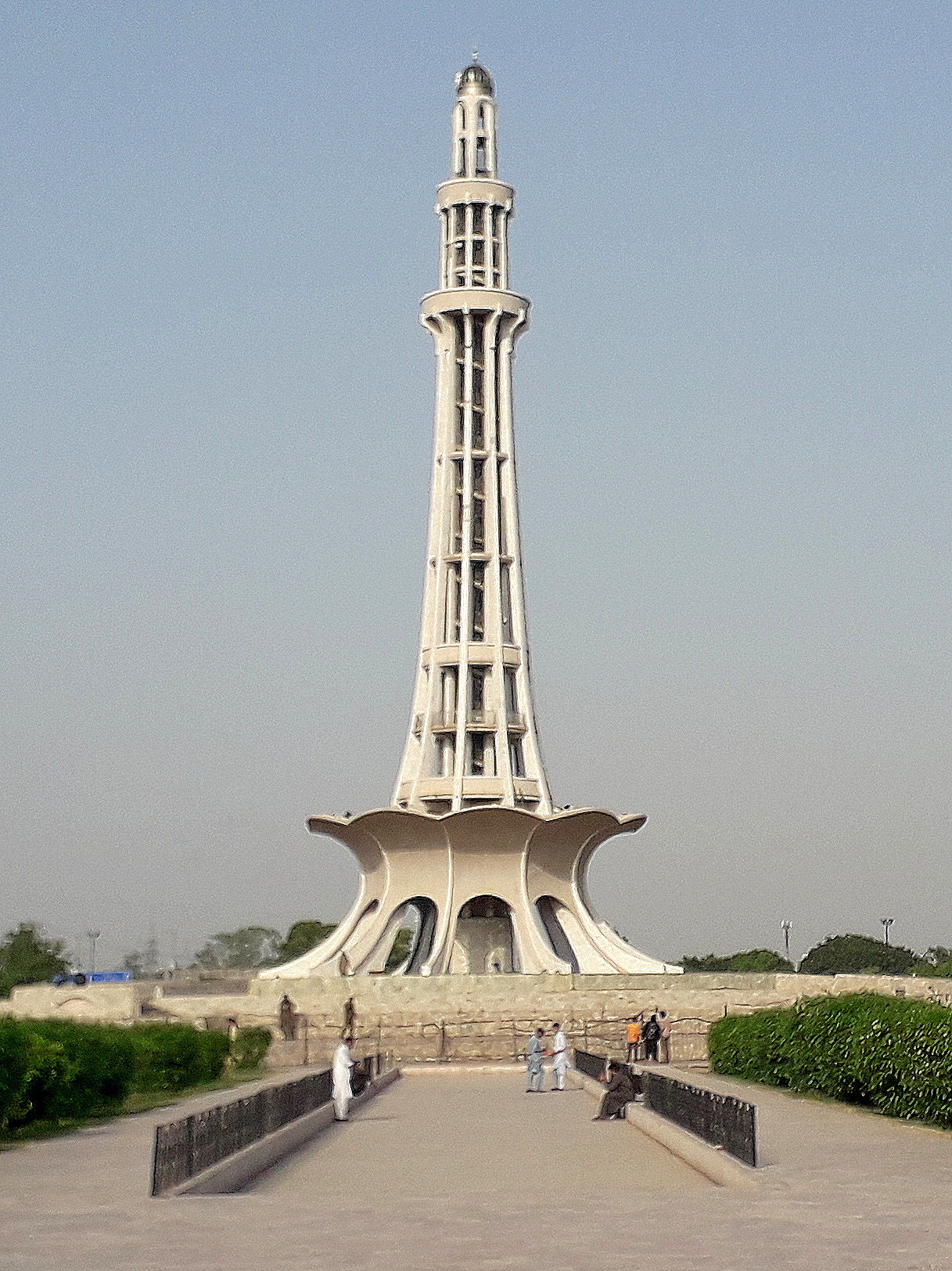
- Minar-e-Pakistan (2021)
- Interactive map of Minar-e-Pakistan
- Location: Greater Iqbal Park, Lahore, Punjab, Pakistan
- Coordinates: 31.5925°N 74.3095°E
- Designer: Nasreddin Murat-Khan
- Type: National monument
- Material: Reinforced concrete, marble, stone, steel
- Width: 97.5 m (320 ft) (diameter)
- Height: 70 m (230 ft)
- Beginning date: 23 March 1960
- Completion date: 22 March 1968
- Dedicated to: Lahore Resolution (Pakistan Resolution)
- Status: National Tower of Pakistan

The Minar-e-Pakistan (Urdu: مینارِ پاکستان, romanised: Mīnār-e-Pākistān; lit. 'Tower of Pakistan') is a public monument tower located in Lahore, Punjab, Pakistan. The tower stands in the Greater Iqbal Park, an urban park in Lahore. The tower was built during 1960–1968 on the site where on 23 March 1940, the All-India Muslim League passed the Lahore Resolution which was later called the Pakistan Resolution – the first official call for a separate and independent homeland for the Muslims of British India, as espoused by the two-nation theory. The resolution eventually helped lead to the creation of Pakistan in 1947.

== Construction ==
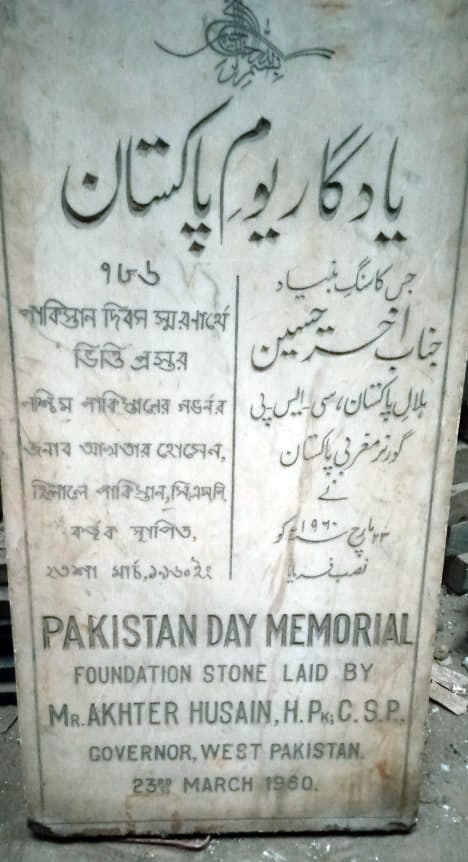
The original foundation stone of Minar-e-Pakistan

On 23 March 1960, the foundation stone of the tower was laid by Akhter Husain, the then–governor of West Pakistan. The construction of the tower took eight years and was completed on 22 March 1968 at an estimated cost of seven million Pakistani rupees. The money was collected by imposing an additional tax on cinema and horse racing tickets at the demand of the governor.

Mian Abdul Khaliq was assigned as the main contractor for the project. Mukhtar Masood, a well-known writer and the then–deputy commissioner of Lahore, was one of the members who undertook an important role for the completion of the project.

== Design ==
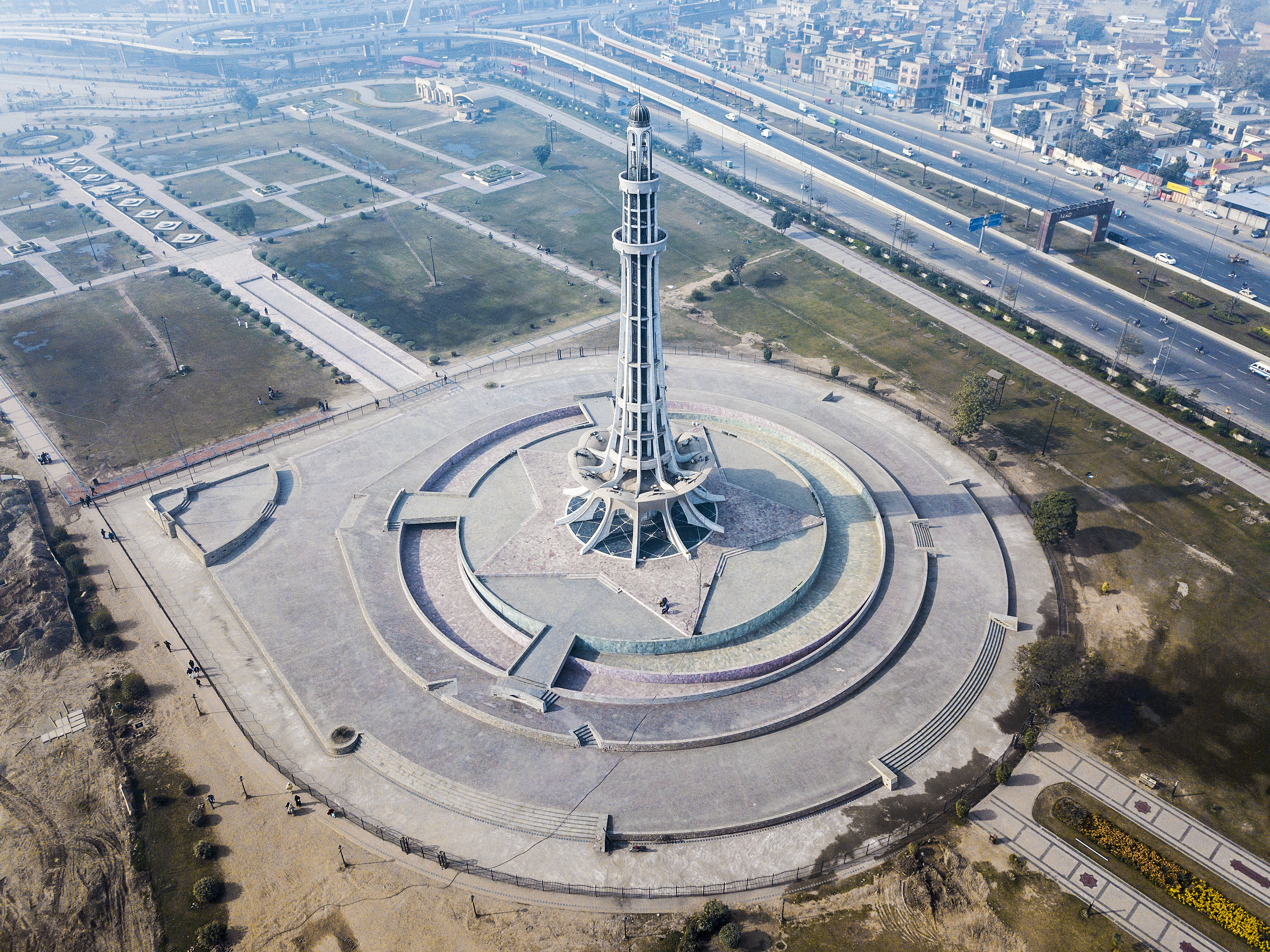
The monument sits atop a plinth.

The tower reflects a blend of Mughal, Islamic and modern architecture. The tower was designed and supervised by Nasreddin Murat-Khan, a Russian-born Pakistani architect and civil engineer.

The tower stands on a five-pointed star-shaped platform that is enclosed by two crescent-shaped pools facing each other. One crescent pool is lined with red marble, the other is lined with green marble. The lower portion of the tower itself is shaped into a flower. The area surrounding the monument is covered with flowers.

=== Structure ===
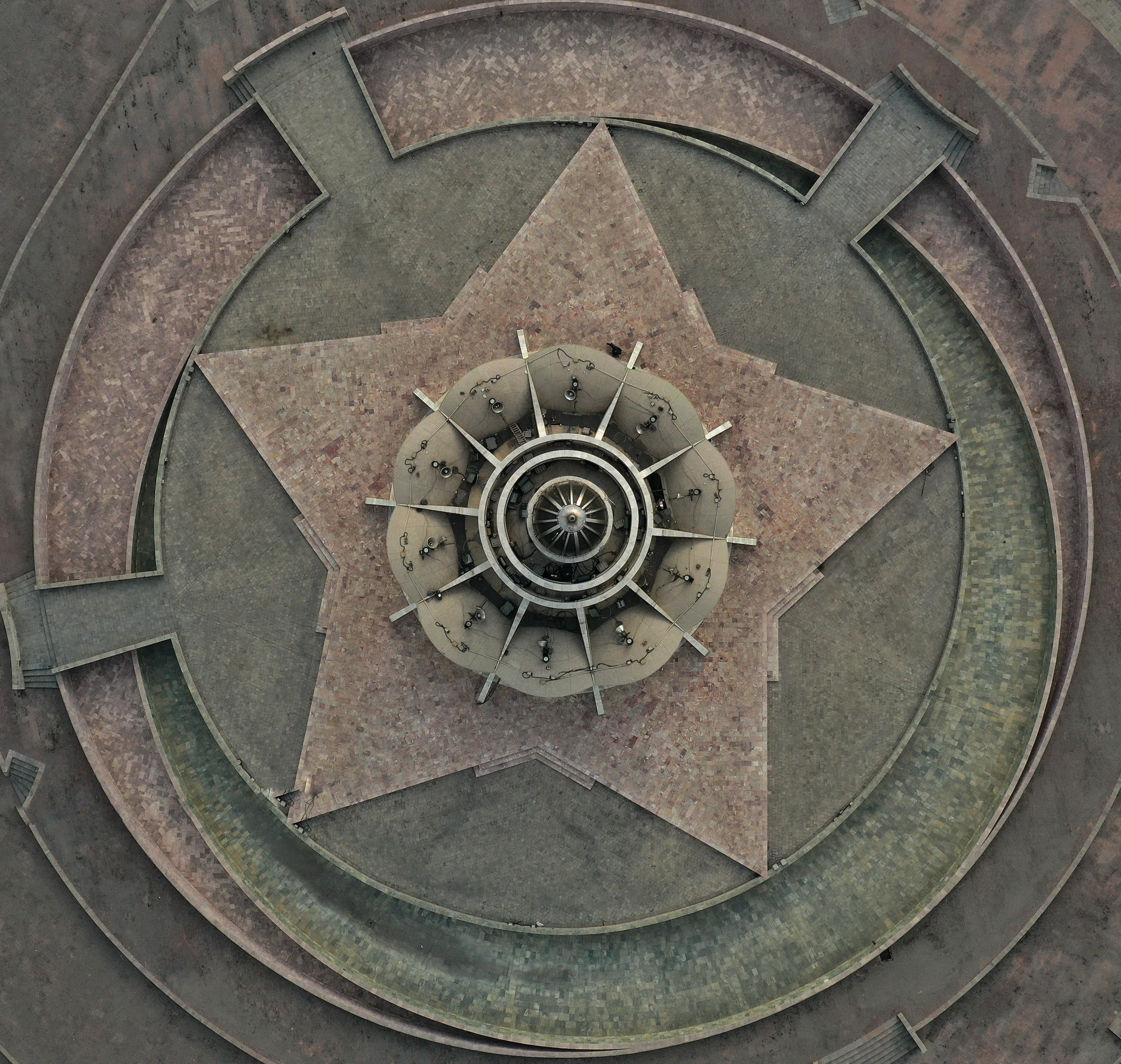
The structure as seen from above

Construction material of the tower is chiefly reinforced concrete along with work of marble and stones on the floors, walls and upstairs. The small dome on the top is made of steel with a pinnacle. The base of the tower rises 8 metres (26 ft) from the ground while the tower stands at a height of 62 metres (203 ft) on the base. This makes the total height of the tower around 70 metres (230 ft) above the ground. The ten unfolding petals of the flower-like base are 9 metres (30 ft) high. The circular diameter of the tower is about 97.5 metres (320 ft). The rostrum is built of patterned tiles, and faces the Mughal-era Badshahi Mosque. The base consists of four platforms that are made of different types of marble and stones. To symbolise the humble beginning of the struggle for freedom, the first platform is built with uncut stones from Taxila, the second platform is made of hammer-dressed stones, and the third platform is made of chiselled stones. The polished white marble used in the fourth and final platform of the base depicts the success of the Pakistan Movement. The structure uses the imagery of crescents, stars and signs that symbolise the culture of Pakistan, similarly seen in the national flag of the country.

=== Inscriptions ===
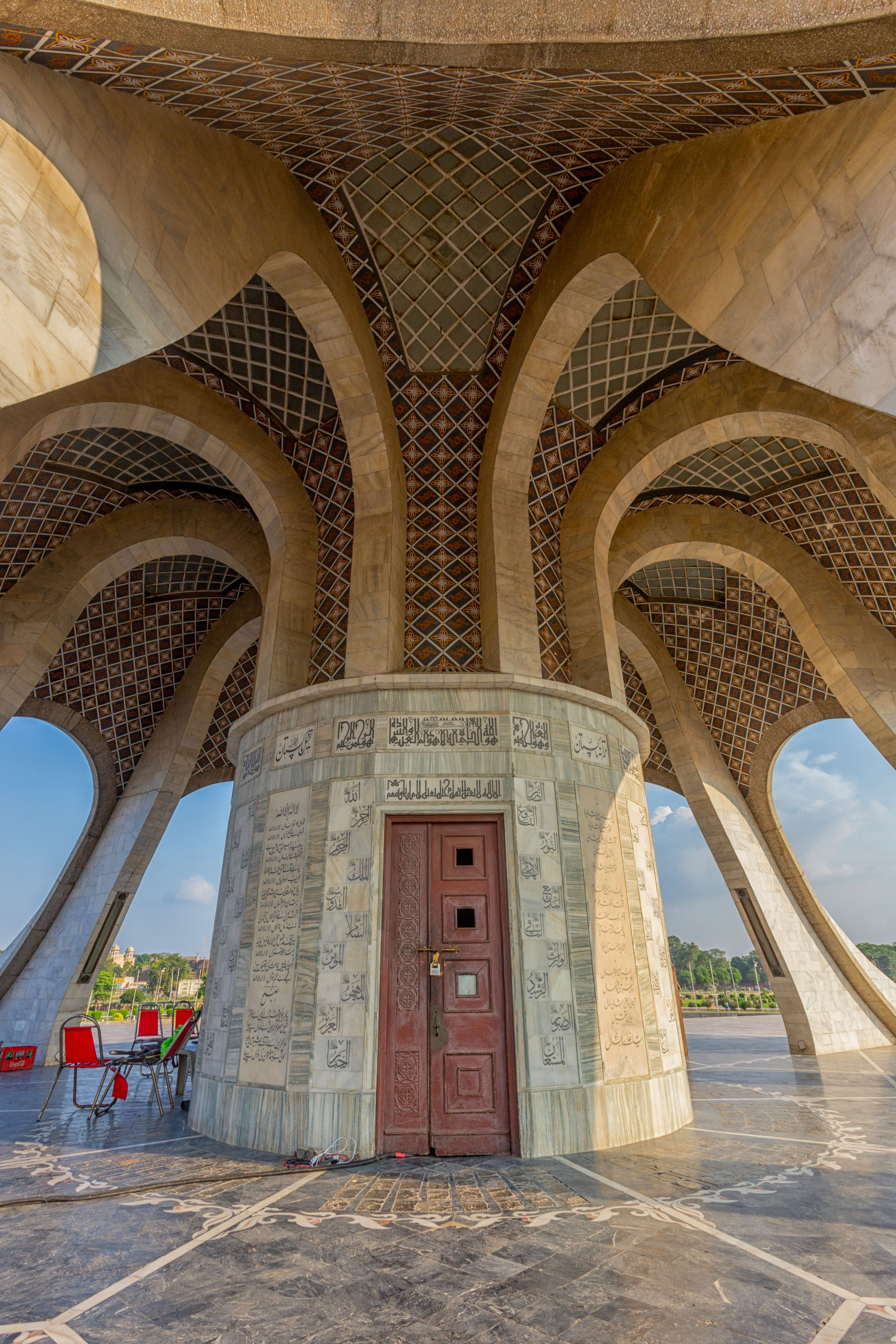
A view of base of the structure

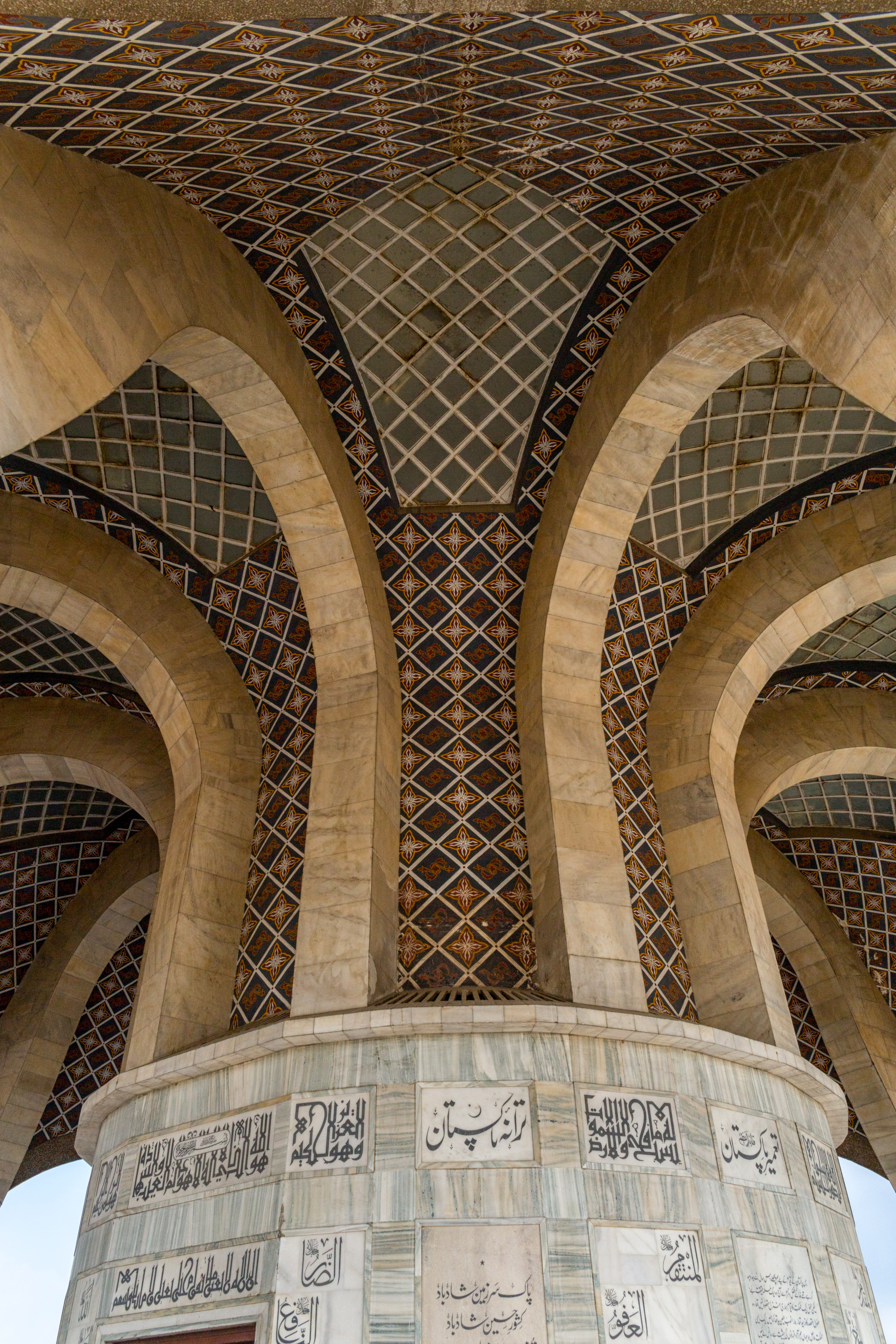
Texts over marble plaques

At the base, there are floral inscriptions on ten converging white marble commemorative plaques. The inscriptions include the text of the Lahore Resolution in Urdu, Bengali and English, as well as the Delhi Resolution's text, which was passed on 9 April 1946. On different plaques, Quranic verses and 99 names of Allah are inscribed in the Arabic calligraphy. Other important inscriptions included on the monument are the national anthem of the country in Urdu and Bengali, excerpts from the speeches of Muhammad Ali Jinnah in Urdu, Bengali and English; and a few couplets written by Muhammad Iqbal.

== Significance ==
Minar-e-Pakistan is considered the national emblem of Pakistan, and an expression of post-colonial national identity.

=== Notable visits and events ===
On 21 February 1999, the then Indian Prime Minister Atal Bihari Vajpayee became the first Indian leader to visit Minar-e-Pakistan (previous Indian state visits to Pakistan had not included a visit to Lahore). Vajpayee's visit was compared to Nixon's visit to China in terms of significance.

On 9 September 2012, the erstwhile Indian Minister for External Affairs S. M. Krishna with Indian High Commissioner Sharat Sabharwal, also made a visit to the monument. Krishna wrote his remarks in visitors album of the monument.

The location is often used for political and religious events. It is also known as the "Liberty Tower of Pakistan". The monument has served as the location for a number of rallies. The rallies have often caused damage to the surrounding flora, according to the Parks and Horticulture Authority. In 2014, the Government of Punjab considered banning any large political or non-political gatherings. In the past, the tower was used to provide a panoramic view to visitors who could access the top by climbing up the spiral stairs or using an elevator. However, this facility was later withdrawn due to a few suicide incidents.

== Gallery ==
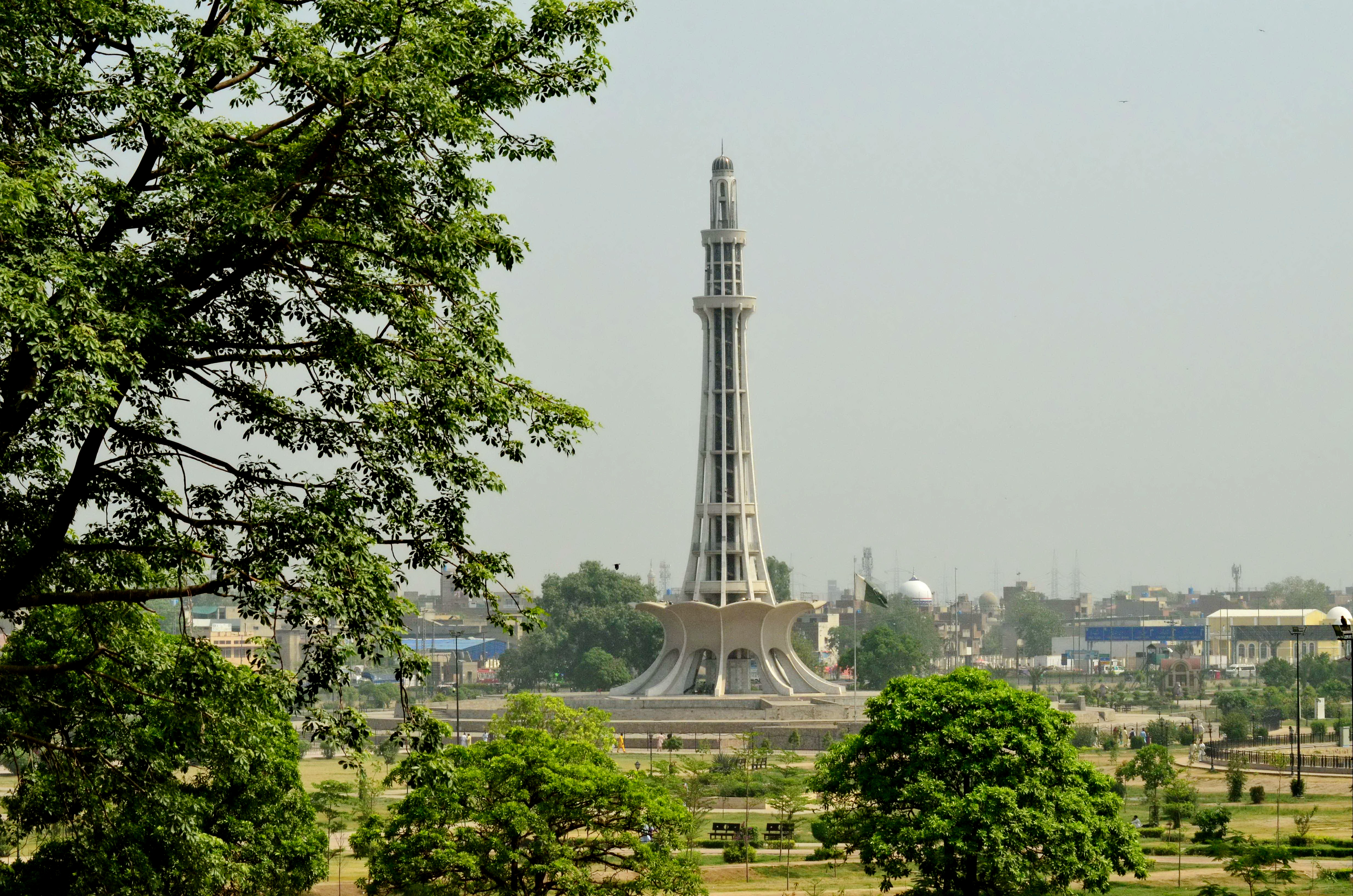
View from the Greater Iqbal Park

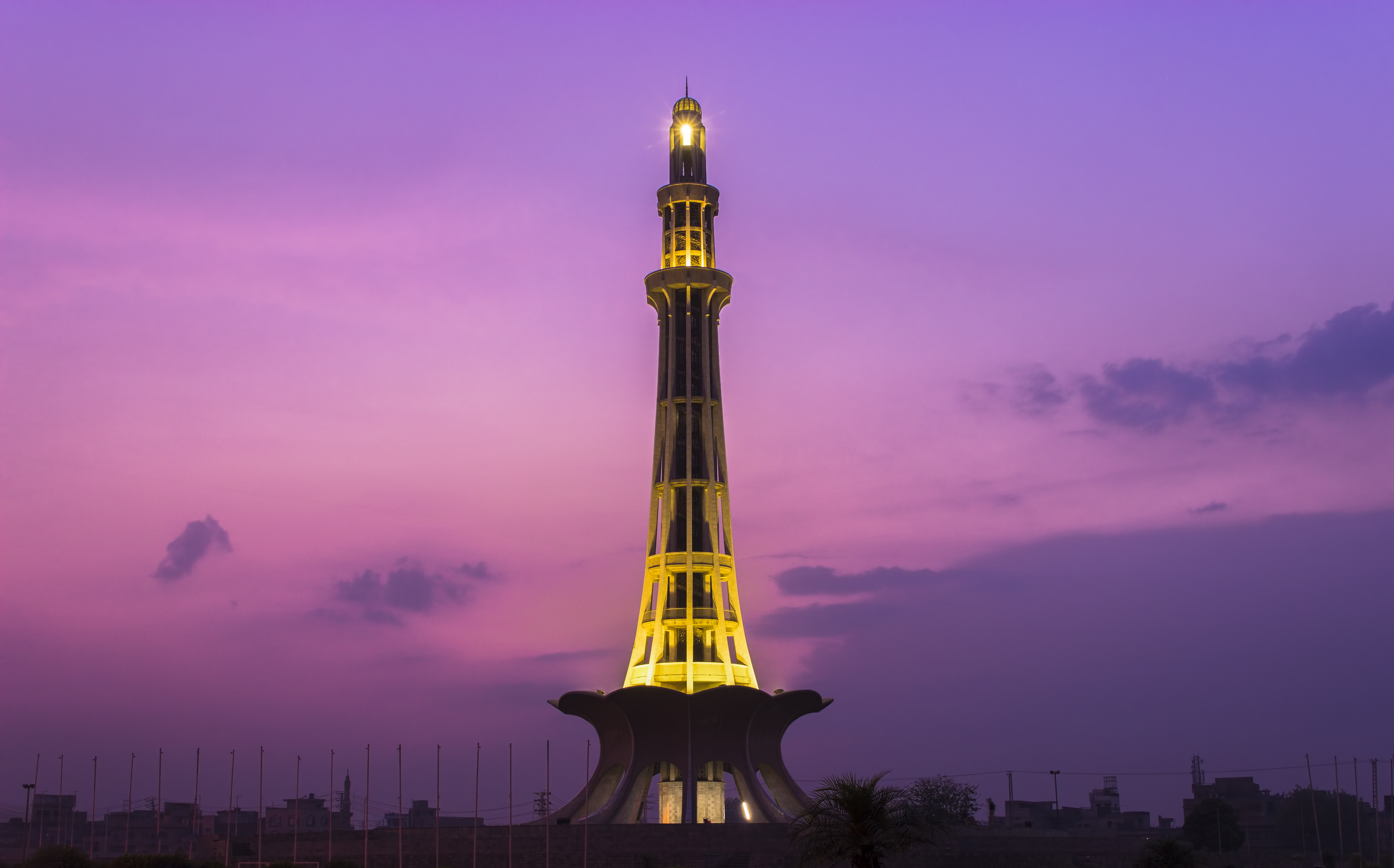
A lit view of the monument in 2014

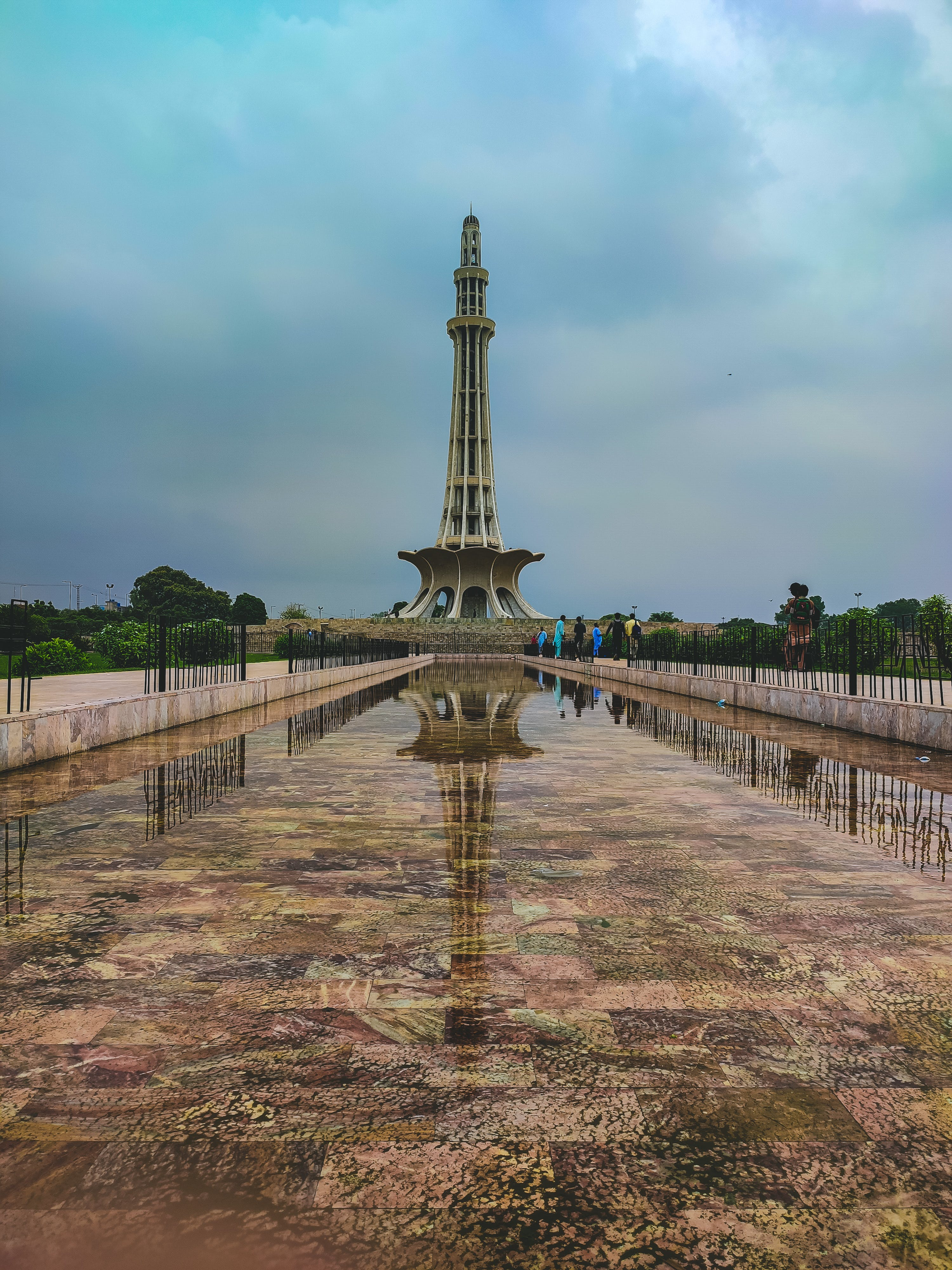
A view under cloudy sky with shadow on the marble floor

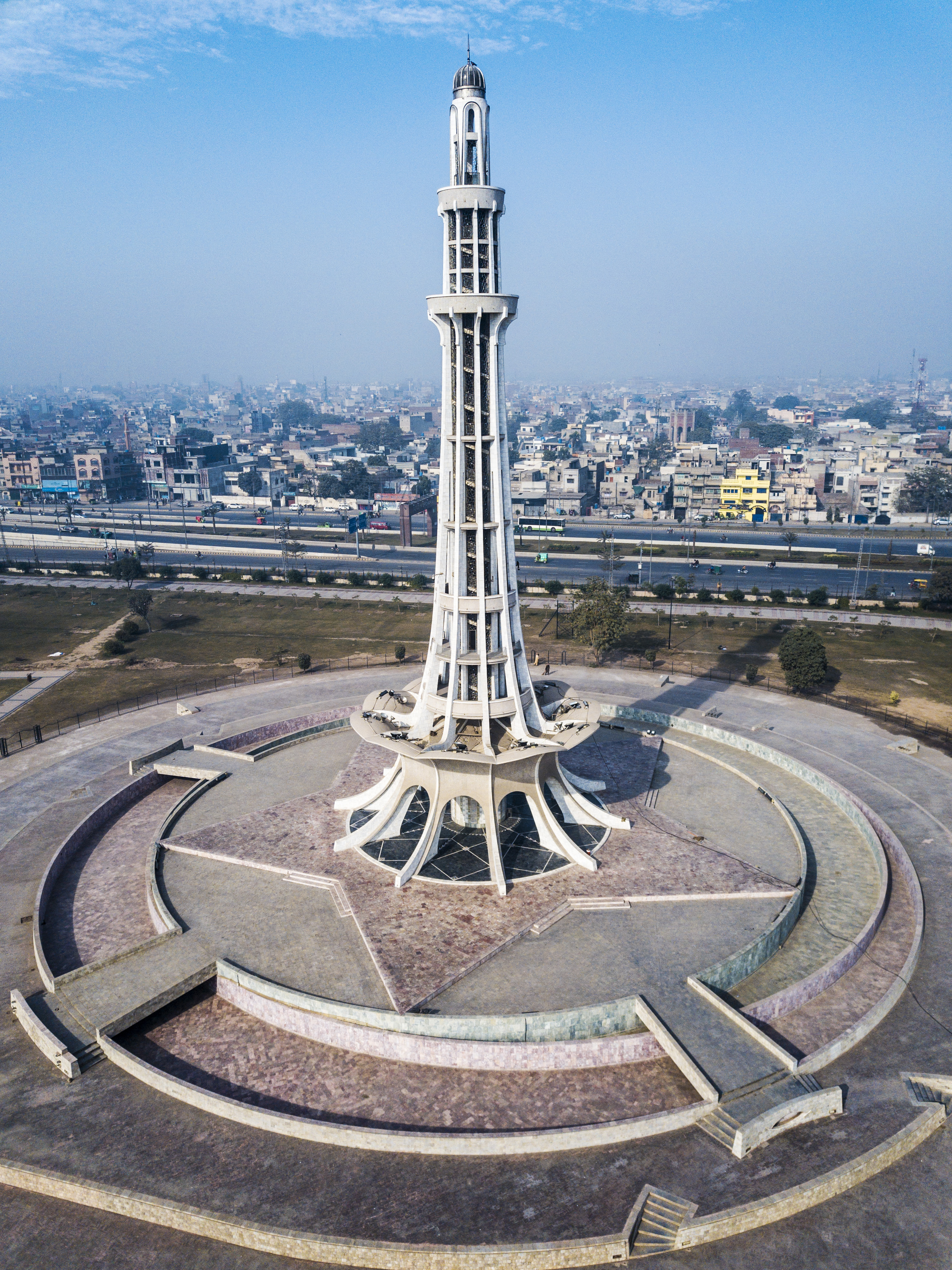
An aerial view

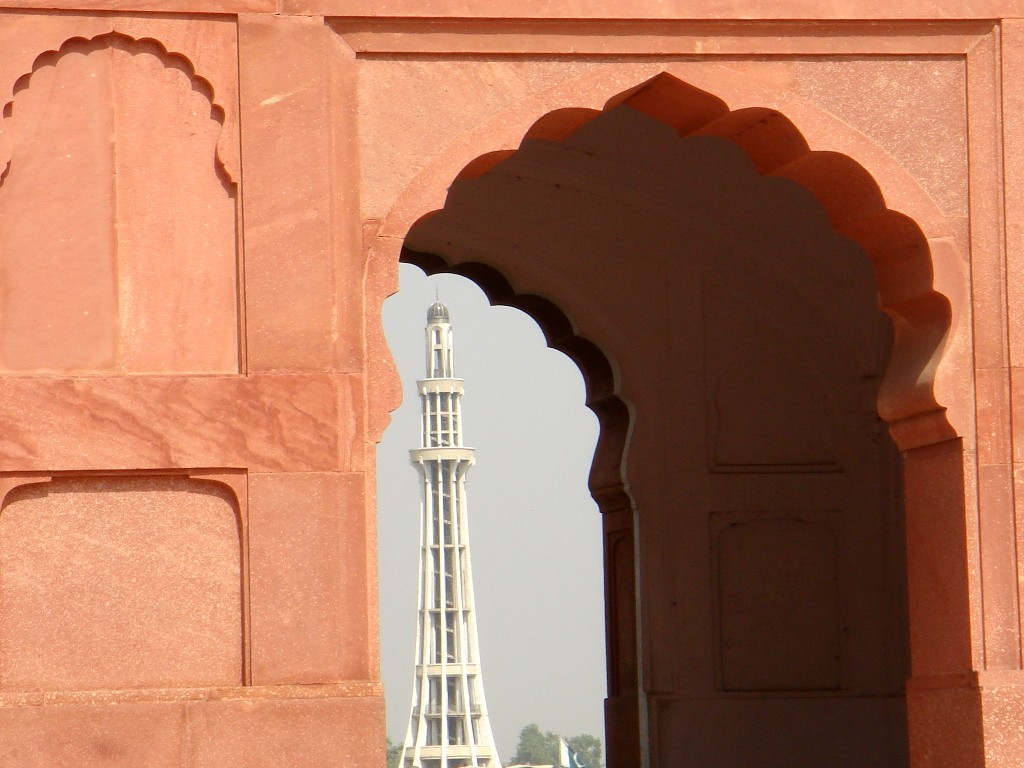
The richly framed by an aisle arch

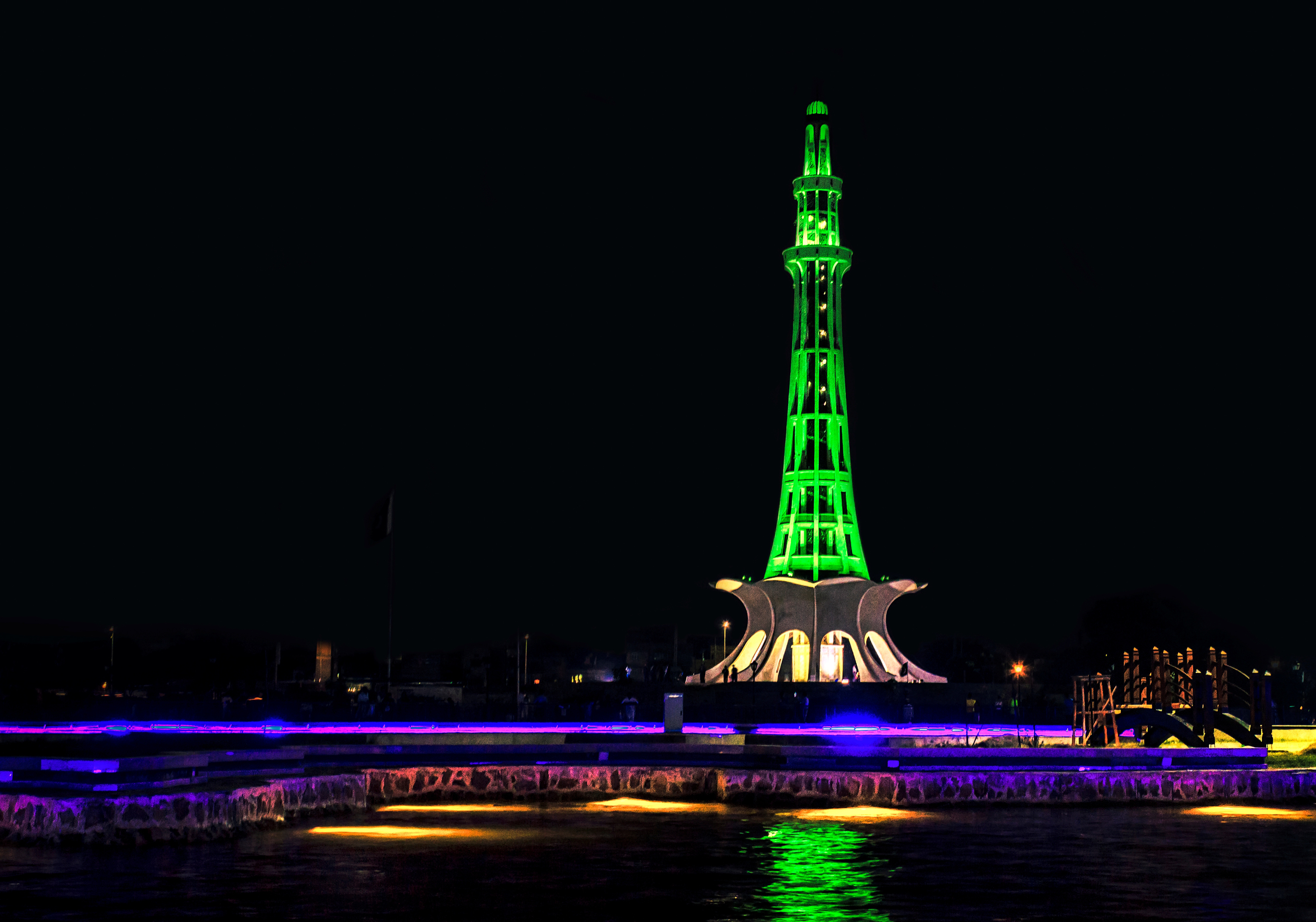
The tower lit during special events

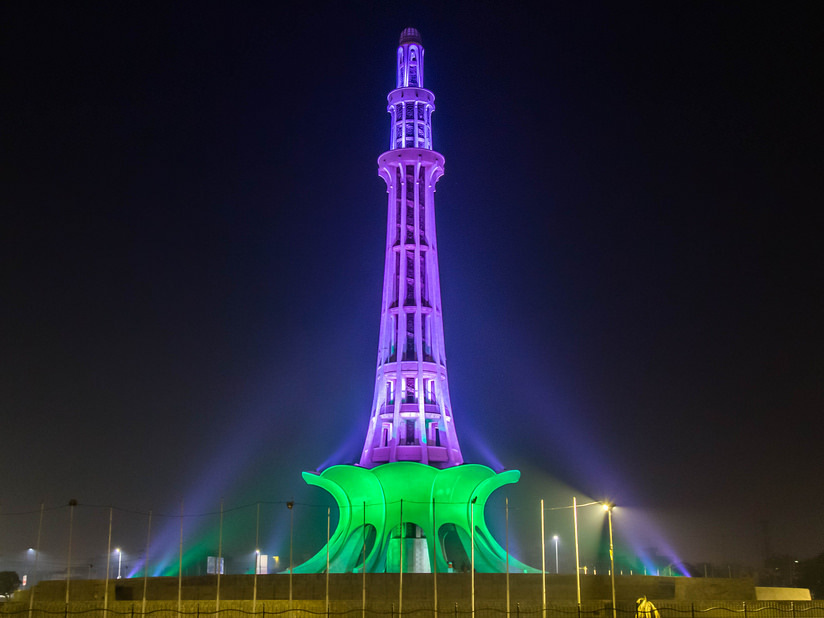
At night

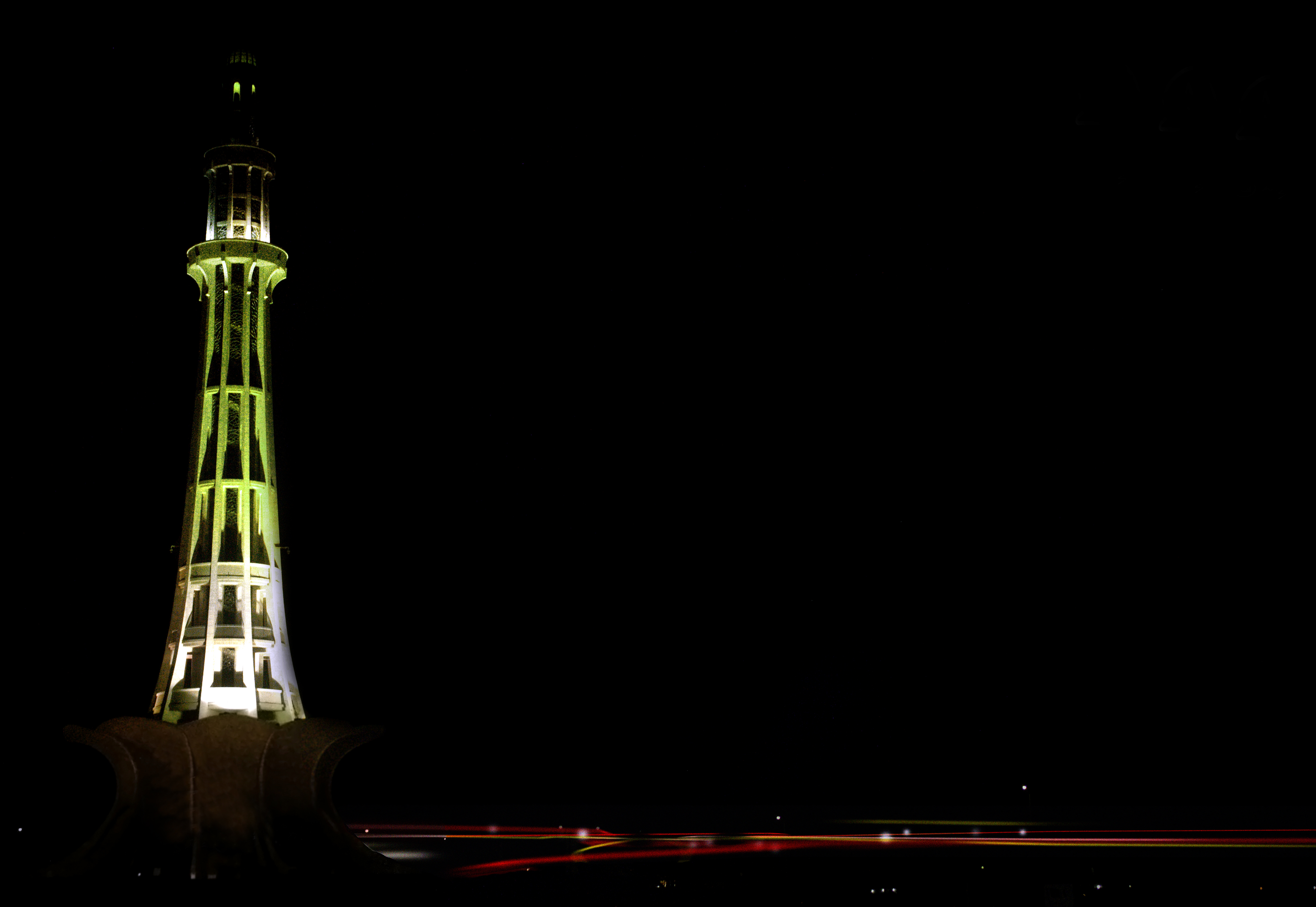
Another night view

== See also ==
- Pakistan Monument
- List of parks and gardens in Lahore
- List of parks and gardens in Pakistan

== Bibliography ==
- State of Human Rights in Pakistan. Pakistan, Human Rights Commission of Pakistan, 2004.
- Chaudhry, Nazir A. (1998). Lahore: Glimpses of a Glorious Heritage. Lahore: Sang-e-Meel Publications. ISBN 978-96-93-50944-1.
- Nadiem, Ihsan H. (1996). Lahore: a Glorious Heritage. Lahore: Sang-e-Meel Publications. ISBN 978-96-93-50718-8.
