= Shahnawaz Khan Mamdot =

Activist in the Pakistan Movement (1883–1942)

Nawab Sir Shahnawaz Khan Mamdot (17 December 1883 – 28 March 1942) was a Pashtun landowner and politician who was a key supporter of the Pakistan movement and for some time, the largest landowner in Punjab.

== Early life and career ==
He was born in Mamdot, Punjab in 1883 into the royal dynasty of Mamdot, a cadet branch of the Kheshgi family. In 1907, he left Punjab and settled in Hyderabad State where he joined the state police. In 1928, Nawab Ghulam Qutbuddin Khan Mamdot, ruler of the Mamdot at that time, died childless. The British Court of Law awarded Shahnawaz the jagirs and title of Nawab of Mamdot, thus making him one of the largest landowners in the Punjab.

He returned to his ancestral land in 1934 and joined the Unionist Party (Punjab). Following the Jinnah-Sikandar Pact in 1937, Mamdot joined the All-India Muslim League and became President of the Punjab Muslim League in 1938. Then he became head of it and started structurally re-organizinig the Punjab Muslim League. He played a key role in organizing the historic session of the All-India Muslim League in March 1940 in Lahore. He personally paid almost all its expenses. He also was the chairman of the reception committee. Jinnah usually stayed at his 'Mamdot Villa' whenever he was in Lahore.

He was knighted in the King's New Year's Honour List at the start of 1939. Later that year, he funded publication of a book by Mian Kifait Ali titled "Pakistan", which caused Mohammad Ali Jinnah to intervene and insist on a name change before publication for risk of antagonizing non-Muslims.

Mamdot was a staunch supporter of a separate Muslim nation, and held the belief that Muslims could never tolerate subjugation to a community with which they shared no common ground in religion, culture and civilisation.

At the Lahore Resolution session in 1940, he gave the welcome address as chairman of the local reception committee.

== Commemorative postage stamp ==
Pakistan Post issued a commemorative postage stamp in his honor in 1990.

== Death and legacy ==
He died of a heart attack in Lahore on 28 March 1942.

He was succeeded as the Nawab of Mamdot, and president of the Punjab Muslim League by his son Iftikhar Hussain Khan Mamdot.
