= Fayaz Khan Kheshgi =

Pakistani Pashto musician

- Born: 30 November 1966 (age 58); Kheshgi
- Origin: Kheshgi
- Genres: Pashto music
- Occupation(s): Musician, Politician, And Entrepreneur
- Years active: 2003 to 2013
- Website: https://www.youtube.com/@fayazkhankheshgiofficial
- Awards: Tamgha-i-Imtiaz (2021)

Fayaz Khan Kheshgi (Pashto: فیاض خان خیشکی) is a Pakistani Pashtun musician and politician from Kheshgi, Nowshera district in Khyber Pakhtunkhwa province. He has also served as a union council Nazim. Fayaz Khan Kheshgi previously worked as a lawyer before pursuing his career in singing and joining active politics. In March 2021, he was awarded the Tamgha-i-Imtiaz by the Government of Pakistan in recognition of his outstanding contribution to Pashto music.

== Children ==
- Azan Khan Kheshgi
- Ali Fayaz Kheshgi
- Hamza Khan kheshgi
- Raza Khan kheshgi

== Awards ==
- Tamgha-i-Imtiaz (2021)
- Fakhr-e-Nowshera (2020)
- Aghan TV Awards (2020)
- Shamshad Television Awards (2018)
