= Kheshig =

Mongol imperial guard

- ᠬᠡᠰᠢᠭᠲᠡᠨ
- Country: Mongol Empire; Qing dynasty
- Branch: Cavalry (ranged)

Kheshig (Хишигтэн; lit. 'blessing') were the imperial guard and shock troops for Mongol royalty in the Mongol Empire—particularly for Genghis Khan and his wife Börte. Their primary purpose was to act as bodyguards for emperors and other nobles. They were divided into two subgroups: the day guard (Torguud) and the night guard (Khebtuul). They were distinct from the regular army and would not go to battle with them, instead staying back on guard duty. Their supreme commander was called the Cherbi.

Because the Mongol Empire spanned most of Eurasia, its impacts on Mongol controlled-areas led to the creation of imperial guards like the Keshik. Kheshig was the term used for the palace guards of the Mughal emperors in India, and also for the matchlocks and sabres, which were changed weekly from Akbar the Great's armoury for the royal use. The royal guards in Persia who watched the King's person at night were also called Keshikchi.

== History ==
The assassination of the leaders of rival Mongol tribes was a common occurrence thanks to the ever-shifting loyalties and conflicting interests at play within Mongol tribal politics. Yesugei, the father of Genghis Khan, was unwittingly poisoned by one of his enemies. The risk was especially high at night since the ger that Mongol nomads traditionally sleep in lacked a solid wall, so a sword or spear could easily penetrate the walls and kill the subject inside. As a result, Mongol rulers typically had personal guards. Toghrul, the khan of the Keraites, had an imperial guard called the Torguud. According to oral tradition, their descendants were the Torghut. After the defeat of Ong Khan in 1203, Genghis established the kheshig. The kheshig consisted mainly of sworn personal followers.

At first, this consisted of seventy day guards (torguud or tunghaut) and eighty night guards (khevtuul). During the reign of Genghis, it seems to have been divided into four groups, commanded by the four generals Muqali, Chormaqan, Bo'orchu and Borokhula. Members of the kheshig outranked almost any other military officers in the Mongol Empire. As it was exceptionally well paid and the vocation was popular, the numbers of Kheshig skyrocketed to the extent that they were only generally on duty for three days in succession. In light of this, the word kheshig refers favor or blessing in the Mongolian language. Membership in the kheshig was regarded as a supreme honor and was an alternative to the necessity of hostage-taking for noblemen. The guard comprised 1000 men in the early days. By the middle of Genghis Khan's reign, Kheshig numbers had expanded to a tumen (10,000 men), commanded by Nayagha, an uncle of Bayan of the Baarin.

The Kheshig originally consisted only of Mongols. As the empire expanded, Genghis Khan's successors recruited Persian, Georgian, Armenian, Alan, Korean, Italian and Russian units. Since the kheshig was the personal appanage of a monarch, his successors did not inherit them. Instead, the kheshigs of deceased Emperors took care of their lords' families and assisted households. However, Güyük Khan took most of his father Ögedei's old kheshig.

For his bodyguards, Kublai Khan retained the traditional kheshig. Kublai created a new Imperial guard force, the suwei, of which half were Chinese and the other half ethnically-mixed. By the 1300s, even the kheshig was flooded with Han Chinese. The suwei were initially 6500 strong, but by the end of the dynasty, it had become 100,000 strong. They were divided into wei or guards, each recruited from a particular ethnicity. Most wei were Chinese, while a few were Mongols, Koreans, Tungusic peoples, Kipchaks and Europeans/Middle Easterners, including Alans and even one unit of Russians. As time progressed, the Keshig was converted into an administrative organisation.

== Units ==
=== Primary units ===
- Torguud (Tunghaut) are the day guard of the Mongol khans. They were always close to their rulers during their conquests or daily-life. Famous Subutai was in the kheshig in his early years.
- Khevtuul are the night guard of the Kheshig, and were tasked with protecting the emperors and rulers while they slept in their yurt. The name, "khevtuul", literally means "ones that are lying" on something like a bed or floor in the Mongolian language, implying that they have something to do with nighttime.

=== Supplementary units ===
- Khorchin were a battle guard of the Khagans. The word Khorchin refers to quiver bearers. Scholars [Who?] believe that the Mongolian clan Khorchin is related to them.
- Asud guard. They consisted of Alans from the northern Caucasus. At first, they served the Mongol monarchs as auxiliaries in battle after the Mongol invasion of Volga Bulgaria in 1236. Kublai Khan organized them into the imperial guard. Their descendants formed the modern Asud.
- Ever-faithful Russian life-guard. One of Kublai's successors, Jayaatu Khan Tugh Temür, formed a unit of Russians near Dadu in 1330.
- Kipchak and Kangly guards. Sometime after 1216, Kipchak and Kangly prisoners served the Mongols in North China as warriors and kharchins (makers of black kumis). Under Kublai Khan, the Kipchaks formed a special guards corps, and the Kangly guard was formed in 1308.

== Descent ==
Many elements in the Mughal Empire shared similar heritage to the Mongols. Such examples are Babur, who was a direct descendant of Timur and Genghis Khan through his father and mother, respectively.

The Kheshgi family, an imperial dynasty of Pashtun origin that played important roles throughout Mughal era, are believed to be descendants of the Kheshig who originated in the surrounding areas of Zamand and Keshik in Iran.

The modern Mongolian Khishigten clan are also believed to be their descendants, who now inhabit Heshigten Banner within Inner Mongolia in China.

== See also ==
- Mongol Empire
- Military of the Mongol Empire
- Society of the Mongol Empire
