= Nawab of Mamdot =

Royal title in Pakistan

The Nawab of Mamdot was the title of the hereditary rulers of Mamdot, a princely state in Punjab, Pakistan.

== Background ==
The Nawabs of Mamdot are from the Kheshgi family. They are a cadet branch of the Nawabs of Kasur.

In 1794, Nizamuddin and his younger brother Qutbuddin, established themselves as rulers of Kasur. Following the death of his elder brother, Qutbuddin began to openly challenge the authority of Maharajah Ranjit Singh and in February 1807, the Maharajah marched on Kasur and removed Qutbuddin from power. As a gesture of goodwill the Maharajh granted Qutbuddin the jagir of Mamdot, territory which he had recently acquired from the Rai of Raikot. In 1831, Qutbuddin was ousted as jagir by his nephew Fatehuddin and soon after died in Amritsar. The Maharajah in turn replaced Fatehuddin with Jamaluddin, the eldest son of Qutubudin.

In 1845, the East India Company offered to confirm Jamaluddin's status in return for support during the forthcoming Sutlej Campaign. Jamaluddin opposed the British at the battles of Mudki and Ferozeshah and in the latter his brother Fatehuddin was killed. Towards the end of the campaign, sensing a British victory, he offered them support at Ferozepur when under attack by the Khalsa Army. For this assistance, in 1848 the British allowed him to retain his possessions and awarded him the title of Nawab. However, later accusations of abuse of power and oppression led to an investigation against him, and he was stripped of his powers in 1855. The state of Mamdot subsequently became part of Firozpur district and the title went into abeyance. On the death of Jamaluddin in 1863, the succession of Mamdot was disputed among the sons of Jamaluddin and his younger brother Jalaluddin.

On 5 October 1864, the Governor-General of India under the authority of the British Crown conferred the hereditary title of Nawab of Mamdot on Jalaluddin. Although he had opposed the British during the Sutlej Campaign, he was deemed untainted by his brother's mis-governance, and rewarded for faithful service during the Second Anglo-Sikh War and the Indian Rebellion of 1857. In 1870, Jamaluddin was made an Honorary Magistrate, and he died in 1875. His titles and possessions passed to his eldest son Nizamuddin.

== Nawabs of Mamdot ==
- Nawab Jamaluddin Khan (died 1863)
- Nawab Jalaluddin Khan (died 1875)
- Nawab Nizamuddin Khan (1862–1891), eldest son of the first Nawab
- Nawab Ghulam Qutbuddin Khan (1889–1928), eldest son of the second Nawab
- Nawab Sir Shahnawaz Khan (1883–1942), great nephew of the first Nawab
- Nawab Iftikhar Hussain Khan (1906–1969) (eldest son of the fourth Nawab), Nawab Aslam Khan Mamdot (middle son of the fourth Nawab), Nawab Zulfiqar Khan Mamdot (youngest son of the fourth Nawab)
- Nawab Pervaiz Iftikhar Mamdot (eldest son of Nawab Iftikhar), Nawab Suhail Khan Mamdot (elder son of Nawab Aslam), Nawab Naveed Aslam Khan Mamdot (younger son of Nawab Aslam), Abdul Qadir Mamdot (son of Nawab Zulfiqar)
- Nawab Shahnawaz Mamdot, eldest son of the sixth Nawab

== Present day ==
The Mamdot family play a key role in Pakistani politics serving as one of the country's largest landowners and influential political families.
