= Haji Bahadar Ali Abdullah Shah =

Sufi saint (1581–1660)

Syed Abdullah shah al Hussaini) popularly known as Hazrat Hajji Bahadar Kohati, was a Sufi saint of Kohat. He was born on 31 July 1581 in Agra.His family lineage traces back to Imam Hussain.(R.a)

== Early life ==
Syed Abdullah Shah al Hussaini later known as Haji Bahadur Kohati, was born in 984 Hijri (1576 CE) in Akbarabad (Agra). He was the son of Syed Muhammad Shah Sultan and the grandson of Syed Mir Sarwar Sultan. His family had migrated from Bukhara to Ghazni and later settled in Agra. According to historical sources, Syed Mir Sarwar Sultan is noted for opposing the religious policy of Mughal Emperor Akbar, particularly the doctrine known as Din-i Ilahi.

Syed Abdullah memorised the Quran at an early age under the supervision of Khwaja Khizar Khan. His early education laid the foundation for his later involvement in Islamic scholarship and Sufism.

== Spiritual training ==
Syed Abdullah Shah entered the Naqshbandi Sufi order through the spiritual mediation of Khwaja Khizar Khan and Sheikh Ahmad Sirhindi, widely known as Mujaddid Alf-e-Sani. He also received spiritual training in the Chishti order under Shah Badruddin, also known as Shah Bulaq, in the Deccan region of India.

== Preaching and travels ==
After performing the Hajj pilgrimage via the port of Surat, Syed Abdullah Shah returned to the Indian subcontinent. On the advice of Sheikh Ahmad Sirhindi, he settled permanently in Kohat, where he became widely known by the epithet "Kohati".

Although associated with multiple Sufi traditions, he primarily propagated the Naqshbandi order. He travelled extensively across regions of present-day India and Afghanistan, engaging in religious teaching and spiritual guidance.

== Family ==
He had five sons:

- Syed Muhammad Yousaf Shah
- Syed Muhammad Qasim Shah
- Syed Muhammad Omar Shah
- Syed Muhammad Usman Shah
- Syed Muhammad Yaqoub Shah

His descendants settled in various regions, including Kohat, Nowshera, Peshawar, Khost (Afghanistan), Lahore, Karachi and Tank.

== Death ==
Haji Bahadur Kohati died in 1070 Hijri (18 March 1660 CE) while returning from Khost, Afghanistan. He died near Bada Khel, close to present-day Hangu. His body was brought to Kohat, where he was buried near a religious Mian khel associated with him.

His death anniversary is traditionally observed on the 6th of Rajab.

== Spiritual lineage ==
Haji Bahadur Kohati's primary spiritual affiliation was with the Naqshbandi order, tracing his lineage through Sheikh Ahmad Sirhindi to Abu Bakr al-Siddiq. His spiritual successors are reported to include prominent figures such as Sheikh Noor Muhammad Mudaqqiq Lahori, Sheikh Mamoon Yousafzai, Sheikh Abdur Rahim Shewaki, Rehman Baba, Shah Murad Dehlvi, and Noor Muhammad Ghaznawi.

== Works ==
Haji Bahadur Kohati is attributed with several scholarly and mystical works, including:

- Miftah al-Haqaiq
- Tibyan al-Haqaiq
- Bahr al-Firasat
- Makhzan al-Haqaiq
- Maarij al-Wilayat

Commentary on Gulistan and Bustan by Saadi.

These works reflect his engagement with Islamic jurisprudence, ethics and Sufi thought.

== Legacy ==
Haji Bahadur Kohati is regarded as an influential Sufi figure in the Kohat region. Among those traditionally associated with his spiritual influence is the Pashto poet Rehman Baba, who is described in historical accounts as having received spiritual guidance within his circle.
