= Waliullah Kheshgi =

Pakistani diplomat

Mohammad Waliullah Khan Khaishgi is a retired Pakistani diplomat.

== Early life ==
Khaishgi was born in Islamabad, Pakistan on 12th September, 1957.

== Foreign service ==
Khaishgi joined the Foreign Service of Pakistan, serving in many senior positions. He has been the Ambassador of Pakistan to Egypt, Senegal, Sri Lanka and Saudi Arabia. He has also held the position of the Additional Foreign Secretary.
