= Delhi Resolution =

Document of the All-India Muslim League

- Presented: 8 April 1946
- Ratified: April 1946; 80 years ago
- Location: Anglo-Arabic Hall, Delhi
- Author(s): Muslim League sub-committee consisting of: Nawab Mohammad Ismail Khan, Mirza Abol Hassan Ispahani, Chaudhry Khaliquzzaman, I.I. Chundrigar, and Abdul Matin Chaudhary; Resolution moved by Huseyn Shaheed Suhrawardy
- Signatories: All-India Muslim League
- Purpose: To abrogate the Lahore Resolution and confirm the Muslim League's intention of advocating a unitary Pakistan

The Delhi Resolution (Urdu:دہلی قرارداد; Bengali:দিল্লির প্রস্তাব) was a Resolution of the All-India Muslim League, written by an All-India Muslim League sub-committee and moved by Prime Minister of Bengal Huseyn Shaheed Suhrawardy, passed during the All-India Muslim League legislators' convention in Delhi in April 1946. It is noted for calling for the establishment of a united Pakistan comprising Northwest India and Northeast India.

== Historical context ==
Until the mid-1930s and 1940s, the Muslim League's approach to the Muslim question was to advocate for political and constitutional safeguards for India's Muslims within a federal India. The 1935 Government of India Act provided separate electorates and provincial devolution, paving the way for the 1937 Indian provincial elections that resulted in the formation of Congress ministries in six out of eight provinces with a Krishok Proja Party-Muslim League coalition ministry formed in Bengal and a Unionist Party ministry formed in Punjab. During the rule of Congress ministries between 1937 and 1939, the Muslim League would direct its propaganda towards highlighting atrocities against Muslims under Congress rule. The outbreak of World War II in September 1939 would lead to the resignation of Congress ministries, leading to Jinnah to call for Deliverance Day in December 1939 to celebrate this. In March 1940, the Lahore Resolution, which called for the establishment of a separate homeland for the Muslims of India, would help popularise the Muslim League and the Pakistan Movement among the Indian Muslim masses whilst sparking debates around the shape of a hypothetical Pakistan. The meaning of the Lahore Resolution is contested given its vagueness and whether it called for a unitary state or two states is highly contested, with those in Bengal particularly advocating that the Lahore Resolution called for the establishment of two states whilst others stating it called for one state. During WW2, the British made several attempts to solve the communal question and deadlock between the All-India Muslim League and Indian National Congress as exemplified by the Cripps Mission of 1942 and 1945 Simla Conference, leading to the holding of elections in 1946. The 1946 Indian provincial elections would come as a plebiscite on Pakistan in favour of Pakistan, proving that Pakistan had mass support among India's 80 million Muslims and it would be after the conclusion of these elections that a legislators convention would be held. After the elections, the Labour Government of Clement Attlee dispatched the 1946 Cabinet Mission to India led by Viceroy Wavell to solve the communal deadlock and the question of transfer of power. The Cabinet Mission called for the creation of a federal India where the Muslim majority zones in the Northwest and Northeast of India were autonomous. However, the Cabinet Mission was unsuccessful due to Jawaharlal Nehru (who was elected President of the INC in July) rejecting it in a press conference in Bombay in spite of Congress President Maulana Azads and AIML President Jinnahs ac'ceptance of the Mission.

== Delhi Legislators Convention ==
The Session was held on 7–9 April 1946 at the quadrangle of the Anglo-Arabic Hall in Delhi. The convention started with a speech by Muslim League President Muhammad Ali Jinnah. Then Liaquat Ali Khan announced the creation of the Subject Committee in each province of India. The next day on Monday 8 April, the Subject Committee approved the Delhi Resolution moved by Suhrawardy, which called for "the Zones comprising Bengal and Assam in the North East and the Punjab, the North West Frontier Province, Sindh and Baluchistan in the North West of India, namely the Pakistan Zones, where the Muslims are a dominant majority, be constituted into one sovereign independent state and that an unequivocal undertaking be given to implement the establishment of Pakistan without delay". Suhrawardy and others would then assert the need for Muslim India to rally around and fight for Pakistan and Jinnah would make a concluding address at the end affirming this.

== Full text ==
The full text of the Resolution reads as follows:

"THE DELHI RESOLUTION"

Whereas in this vast subcontinent of India a hundred million Muslims are adherents of a Faith which regulates every department of their life—education, social, economic and political—whose code is not confined merely to spiritual doctrine and tenets or rituals and ceremonies, and which stands in sharp contrast to the exclusive nature of the Hindu Dharma and Philosophy which has fostered and maintained for thousands of years a rigid caste system resulting in the degradation of sixty million human beings to the position of untouchables, creation of unnatural barriers between man and man, super-imposition of social and economic inequalities on a large body of the people of the country, and which threatens to reduce Muslims, Christians and other minorities to the status of irredeemable helots, socially and economically;

Whereas the Hindu Caste System is a direct negation of nationalism, equality, democracy and all the noble ideals that Islam stands for. Whereas different historical background, traditions, cultures, social and economic orders of the Hindus and the Muslims made impossible the evolution of a single Indian nation inspired by common aspirations and ideals and whereas after centuries they still remain two distinct major nations;

Whereas soon after the introduction by the British of the policy of setting up Political institutions in India on lines of Western Democracies based on majority rule which means that the majority of the nation or society inspite of their opposition as amply demonstrated during the two and half years' regime of Congress Governments in the Hindu majority Provinces, under the Government of India Act 1935, when the Muslims were subjected to untold harassments and oppressions as a result of which they were convinced of the futility and ineffectiveness of the so called safeguards provided in the Constitution and in the Instrument of Instructions to the Governors and were driven to the irresistible conclusion that in a United India Federation, if established, the Muslims, even in Muslim Majority Provinces, could meet with no better fate and their rights and interests could never be adequately protected against the perpetual Hindu majority at the centre;

Whereas the Muslims are convinced that, with a view to saving Muslim India from the domination of the Hindus and in order to afford them full scope to develop themselves according to their genius, it is necessary to constitute a sovereign independent state comprising Bengal and Assam in the North East Zone, and the Punjab, North West Frontier Province, Sind and Baluchistan in the North West Zone;

This Convention of The Muslim League Legislators of India. Central and Provincial, after careful consideration hereby declares that the Muslim Nation will never submit to any constitution for a United India and will never participate in any single constitution making machinery set up for the purpose, and any formula devised by the British Government for transferring power from the British to the peoples of India, which does not conform to the following just and equitable principles calculated to maintain internal peace and tranquility in the country.

I. That the Zones comprising Bengal and Assam in the North East and the Punjab, the North West Frontier Province, Sindh and Baluchistan in the North West of India, namely the Pakistan Zones, where the Muslims are a dominant majority, be constituted into one sovereign independent state and that an unequivocal undertaking be given to implement the establishment of Pakistan without delay.

II. That two separate Constitution making Bodies be set up by the peoples of Pakistan and Hindustan for the purpose of framing their respective constituencies.

III. That the minorities in Pakistan and Hindustan be provided with safeguards on the line of All-India Muslim League Resolution passed on the 23rd March 1940, at Lahore.

IV. That the acceptance of the Muslim League demand for Pakistan and its implementation without delay are the sine qua non for the Muslim League cooperation and participation in the formation of an interim Government at the Centre.

V. This Convention further emphatically declares that any attempt to impose a constitution on a United India basis or to force any interim arrangement at the Centre, contrary to the Muslim demand, will leave the Muslims no alternative but to resist such imposition by all possible means for their survival and national existence.

== Interpretation and aftermath ==
As with the Lahore Resolution, the interpretation of the Delhi Resolution is contested. Outwardly, the Delhi Resolution called for the creation of one unitary Pakistan and abrogated the Lahore Resolution. The Delhi Resolution solidified the notion and reality that Pakistan was going to be one state, not two or more states. Mirza Abol Hassan Ispahani affirms that it was in the interests of Muslim India to advocate for a unitary Pakistan. Ispahani also asserts that the use of the word 'states' in the Lahore Resolution was a typo corrected by the Delhi Resolution. Abul Hashim (then General Secretary of the Bengal Provincial Muslim League) however claims he raised a voice of protest against Jinnah and the Muslim League Subject Committee regarding the change of the word 'states' in the Lahore Resolution to 'state'. Hashim then alleges that Jinnah dismissed it as a typo whilst assuring Hashim that he wanted one constituent assembly for the Muslims of India. Hashim claims he did not attend the Delhi legislator's convention as he would have allegedly been made (like Suhrawardy) to move the Resolution by Jinnah. Nonetheless, Hashim was a lone voice of protest, and any objection to the changing of the wording of the Delhi Resolution was overruled. Chaudhry Khaliquzzaman states that the Delhi Resolution changed the Lahore Resolution's mention of States given that he (and other AIML committee members) felt that Pakistan in the public consciousness "denoted one single State, federal and confederal" and also excluded the clause "with such territorial readjustments" that was in the Lahore Resolution. Historians Shila Sen and Harun-or-Rashid make the argument that Suhrawardy was chosen to move the Resolution in order to bury controversy regarding the change of the word 'states' to 'state'. However, in 1947, Suhrawardy and Hashim along with Sarat Chandra Bose and Kiran Shankar Roy advocated for the United Bengal scheme, which called for the establishment of a sovereign Bengal with equal and proportional representation between Hindus and Muslims. However, due to opposition from the INC and AIML high command among other factors, the scheme failed, and hence the Partition of Bengal and creation of a unitary Pakistan was solidified. Thus, in August 1947, the Indian Independence Act would create the Dominion of India and the Dominion of Pakistan.

== See also ==
- Lahore Resolution
- Partition of India
- Pakistan Movement
- History of Pakistan
