= Lahore Resolution =

Political statement adopted by the All-India Muslim League in Lahore (1940)

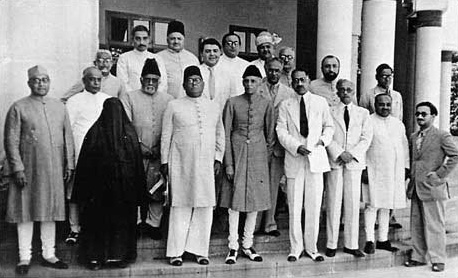
- Muslim leaders from across British India at the All-India Muslim League Working Committee session in Lahore
- Presented: 23 March 1940
- Ratified: 23 March 1940; 86 years ago
- Location: Minto Park, Lahore, Punjab, British India
- Commissioned by: Special Working Committee
- Signatories: All-India Muslim League (General Session)
- Purpose: Establishment of a separate Muslim homeland

The Lahore Resolution, (Note: Urdu: قراردادِ لاہور, romanised: Qarārdād-e-Lāhōr: Persian: قطعنامه لاهور, romanised: Qat'nāma-e-Lāhor) later called the Pakistan Resolution, was a formal political declaration, adopted by the All-India Muslim League on 23 March 1940, that served as the foundational basis for the Pakistan Movement. It was adopted during the League's three-day general session in Lahore, Punjab, from 22 to 24 March 1940, calling for "independent states" in the Muslim-majority regions of British India. The resolution was written and prepared by a nine-member subcommittee of the Muslim League; (Note: which included Muhammad Ali Jinnah, Liaquat Ali Khan, Sikandar Hayat Khan, Khawaja Nazimuddin, Abdullah Haroon, and Nawab Ismail Khan) presented by A. K. Fazlul Huq, the Prime Minister of Bengal; and approved by the General Session of the Muslim League.

The resolution mainly called for independent sovereign states:

That geographically contiguous units are demarcated regions which should be constituted, with such territorial readjustments as may be necessary that the areas in which the Muslims are numerically in a majority as in the North Western and Eastern Zones of (British) India should be grouped to constitute 'independent states' in which the constituent units should be autonomous and sovereign.

Although the name "Pakistan" had been proposed by Choudhary Rahmat Ali in his 1933 Pakistan Declaration, it was not until after the resolution that it began to be widely used.

Muhammad Ali Jinnah's address to the Lahore conference was, according to Stanley Wolpert, the moment when Jinnah, once a proponent of Hindu-Muslim unity, irrevocably committed to force the creation of an independent Pakistan.

== Historical context ==
Until the mid-1930s the Muslim leaders were trying to ensure maximum political safeguards for Muslims within the framework of federation of India in terms of seeking maximum autonomy for Muslim majority provinces. They obtained safeguards through a system of separate electorates on communal basis in the Government of India Act 1935. As a result of elections held under this Act, Indian National Congress formed government in six out of eight provinces. During Congress rule from 1937 to 1939, its "High Command" whose iron control over its own provinces clearly hinted at what lay ahead for the Muslim majority provinces once it came to dominate the centre. Much of the League's propaganda at this stage was directed against the Congress ministries and their alleged attacks on Muslim culture; the heightened activity of Hindu Mahasabha, the hoisting of Congress tricolor, the singing of Bande Mataram, the Vidya Mandir scheme in the Central Provinces and the Wardha scheme of education, all were interpreted as proof of 'Congress atrocities'. Thus, the Congress was clearly incapable of representing Muslim interests, yet it was trying to annihilate every other party."

Therefore, by 1938–39, the idea of separation was strongly gaining ground. The Sindh Provincial Muslim League Conference held its first session in Karachi in October 1938, adopted a resolution which recommended to the All-India Muslim League to devise a scheme of constitution under which Muslims may attain full independence. The League examined various schemes to this end, including that outlined in Mian Kifait Ali's Confederacy of India, as well as schemes by Sir Sikandar Hayat Khan, and Professors Syed Zafarul Hasan and Muahmmad Afzal Husain Qadri. The premier of the Bengal province, A. K. Fazal-ul-Haque, who was not in the All-India Muslim League, was quite convinced in favour of separation. The idea was more vividly expressed by M. A. Jinnah in an article in the London weekly Time & Tide on 9 March 1940. Jinnah wrote:

Democratic systems based on the concept of homogeneous nations such as England are very definitely not applicable to heterogeneous countries such as India, and this simple fact is the root cause of all of India's constitutional ills... If, therefore, it is accepted that there is in India a major and a minor nation, it follows that a parliamentary system based on the majority principle must inevitably mean the rule of major nation. Experience has proved that whatever the economic and political programme of any political Party, the Hindu, as a general rule, will vote for his caste-fellow, the Muslim for his coreligionist.

About the Congress-led provincial governments, he wrote:

An India-wide attack on the Muslims was launched. In the five Muslim provinces every attempt was made to defeat the Muslim-led-coalition Ministries. In the six Hindu provinces a "Kulturkampf" was inaugurated. Attempts were made to have Bande Mataram, the Congress song, recognised as the national anthem, and the real national language, Urdu, supplanted by Hindi. Everywhere oppression commenced and complaints poured in such force...that the Muslims, despairing of the Viceroy and Governors ever taking action to protect them, have already been forced to ask for a Royal Commission to investigate their grievances.

Furthermore, he added:

Is it the desire (of British people) that India should become a totalitarian Hindu State...? ...I feel certain that Muslim India will never submit to such a position and will be forced to resist it with every means in their power.

In his concluding remarks he wrote:

While Muslim League irrevocably opposed to any Federal objective which must necessarily result in a majority community rule under the guise of Democracy and Parliamentary system of Government... To conclude, a constitution must be evolved that recognises that there are in India two nations who both must share the governance of their common motherland.

== Lahore Conference ==
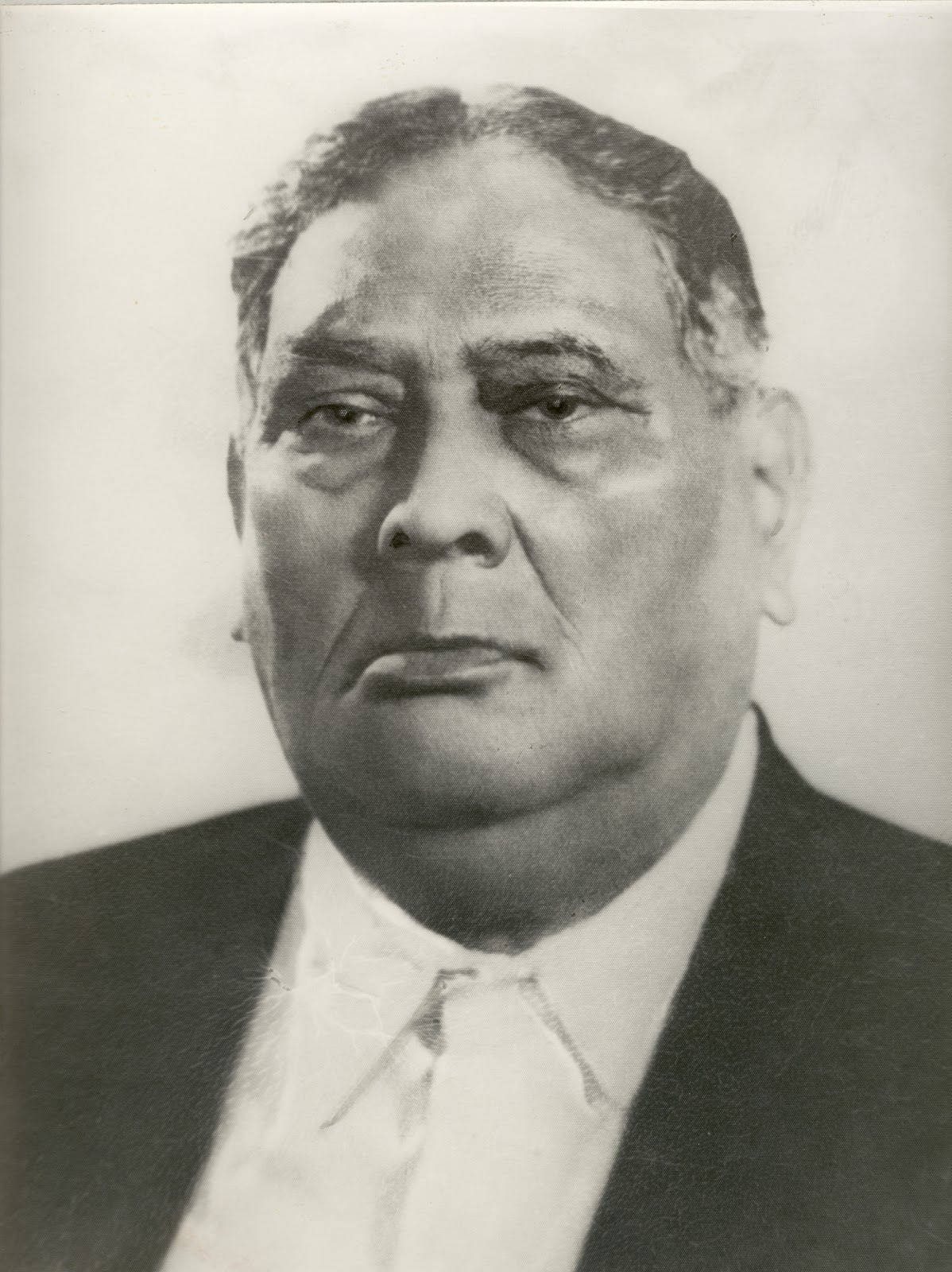
A. K. Fazlul Huq presented the historical Lahore resolution in 1940.

The session was held on 22–24 March 1940, at Iqbal Park, Lahore. The welcome address was made by Sir Shah Nawaz Khan of Mamdot, as the chairman of the local reception committee. The various draft texts for the final resolution/draft were deliberated over by the Special Working Committee of the All India Muslim League

The resolution text, unanimously approved by the Subject Committee, accepted the concept of a united homeland for Muslims and recommended the creation of independent Muslim-majority states.

The resolution was moved in the general session by A. K. Fazlul Huq, the chief minister of undivided Bengal, and was seconded by Chaudhry Khaliquzzaman from the United Provinces, Zafar Ali Khan from Punjab, Sardar Aurangzeb Khan from North-West Frontier Province, Pir Ziauddin Andrabi from Kashmir, and Sir Abdullah Haroon from Sindh. Qazi Muhammad Essa from Balochistan and other leaders announced their support.

== The resolution ==
30 March 1940: Newspapers printed news about Lahore Resolution, demanding division of India.

The resolution for the establishment of "independent states" for the Muslims of British India passed in the annual session of the All India Muslim League held in Lahore on 22–24 March 1940 is a landmark document of Pakistan's history. In 1946, it formed the basis for the decision of Muslim League to struggle for one state (later named Pakistan) for the Muslims. The statement declared:

No constitutional plan would be workable ... or acceptable to the Muslims unless ... geographically contiguous units are demarcated into regions which should be so constituted, with such territorial readjustments as may be necessary.

The Hindu press and leaders were quick to describe the resolution as the demand for the creation of Pakistan; some people began to call it the Pakistan Resolution soon after the Lahore session of the Muslim League. It is landmark document in history of Pakistan. Additionally, it stated:

That adequate, effective and mandatory safeguards shall be specifically provided in the constitution for minorities in the units and in the regions for the protection of their religious, cultural, economic, political, administrative and other rights of the minorities.

Most importantly, to convince smaller provinces such as Sindh to join, it provided a guarantee:

That geographically contiguous units are demarcated into regions which should be so constituted, with such territorial readjustments as may be necessary, that the areas in which the Muslims are numerically in a majority as in North-Western and Eastern zones of [British] India should be grouped to constitute independent states in which the constituent units shall be autonomous and sovereign.

=== Full text ===
The full text of the resolution document was as follows:

"THE LAHORE RESOLUTION"

Resolved at the Lahore Session of All-India Muslim League held on 22nd–24th March, 1940.

- (1) While approving and endorsing the action taken by the Council and the Working Committee of the All Indian Muslim League as indicated in their resolutions dated the 10th of August, 17th and 18th of September and 22nd of October, 1939, and 3rd February 1940 on the constitutional issues, this Session of the All-Indian Muslim League emphatically reiterates that the scheme of federation embodied in the Government of India Act 1935, is totally unsuited to, and unworkable in the peculiar conditions of this country and is altogether unacceptable to Muslim India.
- (2) Resolved that it is the considered view of this Session of the All India Muslim League that no constitutional plan would be workable in this country or acceptable to Muslims unless it is designed on the following basic principle, namely that geographically contiguous units are demarcated into regions which should be so constituted, with such territorial readjustments as may be necessary, that the areas in which the Muslims are numerically in a majority as in the North-Western and Eastern Zones of India, should be grouped to constitute "Independent States" in which the constituent units shall be autonomous and sovereign.
- (3) That adequate, effective and mandatory safeguards should be specifically provided in the constitution for minorities in these units and in these regions for the protection of their religious, cultural, economic, political, administrative and other rights and interests in consultation with them; and in other parts of India where the Mussalmans are in a minority, adequate, effective and mandatory safeguards shall be specially provided in the constitution for them and other minorities for the protection of their religious, cultural, economic, political, administrative and other rights and interests in consultation with them.
- (4) This Session further authorises the Working Committee to frame a scheme of constitution in accordance with these basic principles, providing for the assumption finally by the respective regions of all powers such as defense, external affairs, communications, customs and such other matters as may be necessary.

== Controversy ==
=== Number of "independent states" ===
There remains a debate on whether the resolution envisaged two sovereign states in the eastern and western parts of British India. Abul Hashim of the Bengal Provincial Muslim League interpreted the text as a demand for two separate countries. In 1946, Prime Minister H. S. Suhrawardy of Bengal, a member of the All India Muslim League, mooted the United Bengal proposal with the support of Muslim and Hindu leaders, as well as the Governor of Bengal.

=== Dissent by nationalist Muslims in colonial India ===
The All India Azad Muslim Conference gathered in Delhi in April 1940 to voice its support for an independent and united India, in response to the Lahore Resolution. Its members included several Islamic organisations in India, as well as 1400 nationalist Muslim delegates. The pro-separatist All-India Muslim League worked to try to silence those nationalist Muslims who stood against the partition of India, often using "intimidation and coercion". The murder of the Chief Minister of Sind and All India Azad Muslim Conference leader Allah Bakhsh Soomro also made it easier for the All-India Muslim League to demand the creation of a Pakistan.

== Legacy ==
The Sindh assembly was the firstly British Indian legislature to pass the resolution in favour of Pakistan. G. M. Syed, an influential Sindhi activist, revolutionary and Sufi and later one of the important leaders in the forefront of the Sindh independence movement, joined the Muslim League in 1938 and presented the Pakistan resolution in the Sindh Assembly. A key motivating factor was the promise of "autonomy and sovereignty for constituent units".

This text was buried under the Minar-e-Pakistan during its building in the Ayub regime. In this session the political situation was analysed in detail and Muslim demanded a separate homeland only to maintain their identification and to safeguard their rights. Pakistan resolution was the landmark in the history of Muslim of South-Asia. It determined for the Muslims a true goal and their homeland in north-east and north-west.

=== Commemoration ===
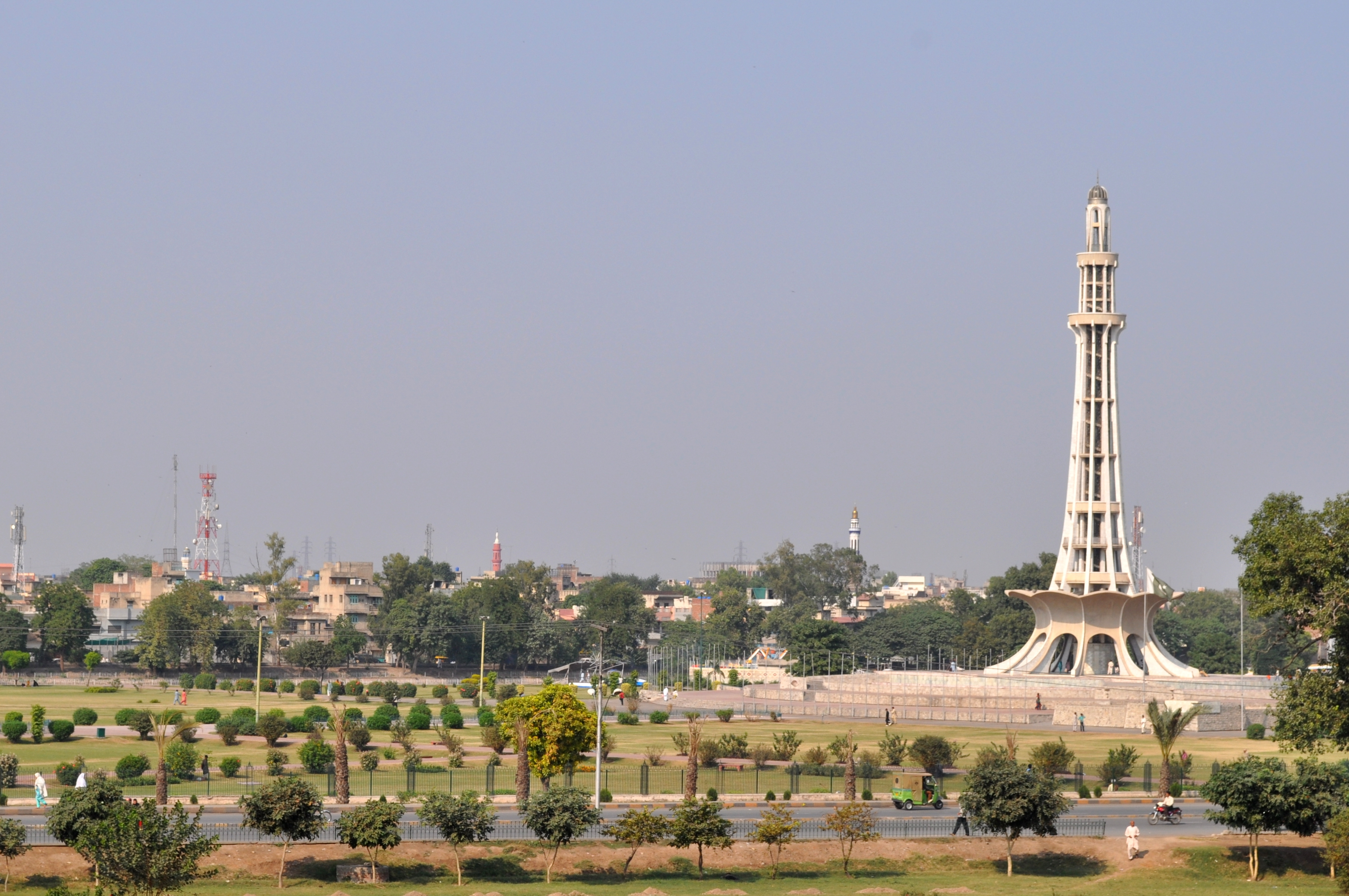
The Minar-e-Pakistan, where the Lahore Resolution was passed.

- To commemorate the event, Minar-e-Pakistan, a monument 60 m tall in the shape of a minaret, was built at the site in Iqbal Park where the resolution was passed.
- 23 March (Pakistan Day) is a national holiday in Pakistan to commemorate both Lahore Resolution (1940) and the Republic Day (1956); the country became the first Islamic Republic in the world.

== See also ==
- History of Pakistan
- History of Bangladesh
- Partition of India
- Pakistan Resolution in Sindh assembly
- Delhi Resolution
- Six Point program
- Bangladesh–Pakistan Confederation
