= Pakistani nationalism =

Nationalism as applied to Pakistanis

Flag of Pakistan

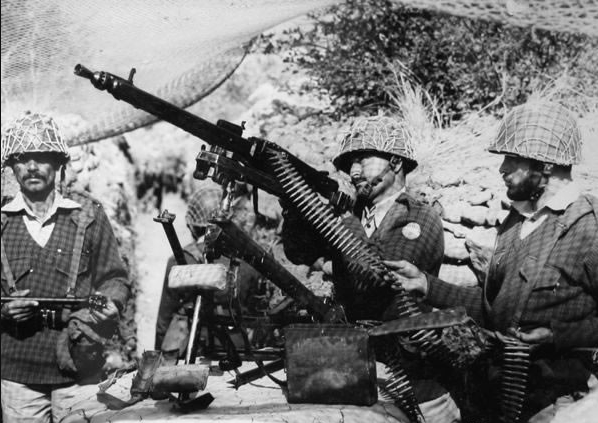
National rituals in Pakistan are replete with military symbols and aesthetics, especially based in the Indo-Pakistan Wars

Founder of Pakistan, Muhammad Ali Jinnah, known in Pakistan as "Quaid-e-Azam" (The Great Leader), was the leader of the Pakistani nationalist movement that led to the creation of Pakistan in 1947.

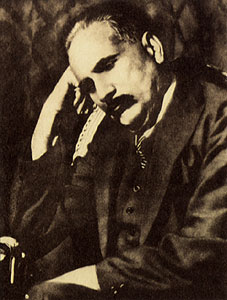
Muhammad Iqbal is the national poet of Pakistan and laid the seeds of Pakistani nationalism by envisioning a separate homeland for Muslims in South Asia.

Pakistani nationalism refers to the political, cultural, linguistic, historical, religious and geographical expression of patriotism by the people of Pakistan, of pride in the history, heritage and identity of Pakistan, and visions for its future.

Pakistani nationalism is commonly tied to state and Islamic nationalism in nature of being the nationalism of the religion, culture, traditions, languages and historical region that make up Pakistan, inhabited by mostly Muslims. The culture, languages, literature, history of the region along with influence of Islam was the basis of Pakistani nationalist narrative. It is also a militarist nationalism in that it often involves glorification of the military.

From a political point of view and in the years leading up to the independence of Pakistan, the particular political and ideological foundations for the actions of the Muslim League can be called a Pakistani nationalist ideology. It is a singular combination of religious, cultural, nationalist and philosophical elements.

== National consciousness in Pakistan ==
=== Muslim League separatist campaign in Colonial India ===
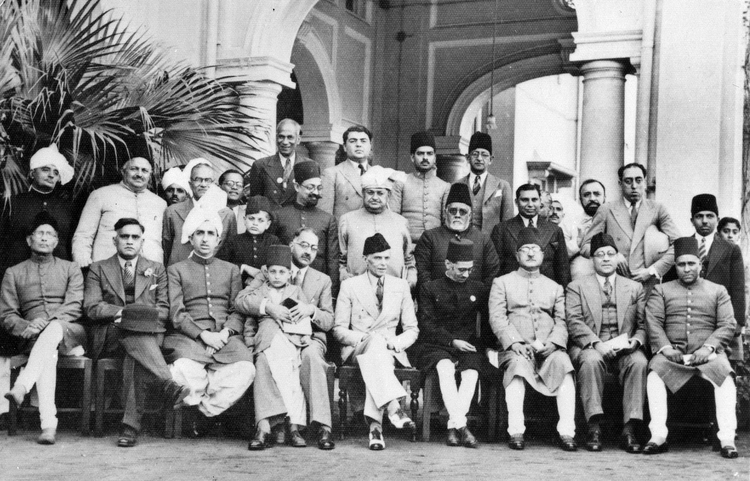
The leaders of the Muslim League, 1940. Jinnah is seated at centre.

The roots of Pakistani nationalism lie in the separatist campaign of the Muslim League in British India, which sought to create a new state for Indian Muslims called Pakistan, on the basis of Islam. This concept of a separate state for India's Muslims traces its roots to Allama Iqbal, who has retroactively been dubbed the national poet of Pakistan. Iqbal was elected president of the Muslim League in 1930 at its session in Allahabad in the United Provinces, as well as for the session in Lahore in 1932. In his presidential address on 29 December 1930 he outlined a vision of an independent state for Muslim-majority provinces in north-western India:

I would like to see the Punjab, North-West Frontier Province, Sind and Baluchistan amalgamated into a single state. Self-government within the British Empire, or without the British Empire, the formation of a consolidated Northwest Indian Muslim state appears to me to be the final destiny of the Muslims, at least of Northwest India.

For a large majority of the Muslim intelligentsia, including Iqbal, Indo-Muslim culture became a rallying ground for making the case for a separate Muslim homeland. The concept of Indo-Muslim culture was based on the development of a separate political and cultural identity during Muslim rule which built upon the merging of Persian and Indic languages, literature and arts. According to Iqbal, the uppermost purpose of establishing a separate country was the preservation of the Muslim "cultural entity", which he believed would not be safe under the rule of the Hindu majority. Syed Ahmed Khan, the grandson of the Mughal Vizier, Dabir-ud-Daulah, emphasised that Muslims and Hindus made up two different nations on the basis that Hindus were not ready to accept the contemporary Muslim culture and tradition which was exemplified by Hindu opposition to the Urdu language.

The demand for the creation of Pakistan as a homeland for Indian Muslims, according to many academics, was orchestrated mainly by the elite class of Muslims in colonial India primarily based in the United Provinces (U.P.) and Bihar who supported the All India Muslim League. In the colonial Indian province of Sind, the historian Ayesha Jalal describes the actions that Jinnah's pro-separatist Muslim League used in order to spread communal division and undermine the government of Allah Bakhsh Soomro, which stood for a united India:

Even before the 'Pakistan' demand was articulated, the dispute over the Sukkur Manzilgah had been fabricated by provincial Leaguers to unsettle Allah Bakhsh Soomro's ministry which was dependent on support from the Congress and Independent Party. Intended as a way station for Mughal troops on the move, the Manzilgah included a small mosque which had been subsequently abandoned. On a small island in the near distance was the temple of Saad Bela, sacred space for the large number of Hindus settled on the banks of the Indus at Sukkur. The symbolic convergence of the identity and sovereignty over a forgotten mosque provided ammunition for those seeking office at the provincial level. Making an issue out of a non-issue, the Sind Muslim League in early June 1939 formally reclaimed the mosque. Once its deadline of 1 October 1939 for the restoration of the mosque to Muslims had passed, the League started an agitation.

The Muslim League, seeking to spread religious strife, "monetarily subsidised" mobs that engaged in communal violence against Hindus and Sikhs in the areas of Multan, Rawalpindi, Campbellpur, Jhelum and Sargodha, as well as in the Hazara District. Jinnah and the Muslim League's communalistic Direct Action Day in Calcutta resulted in 4,000 deaths and 100,000 residents left homeless in just 72 hours, sowing the seeds for riots in other provinces and the eventual partition of the country.

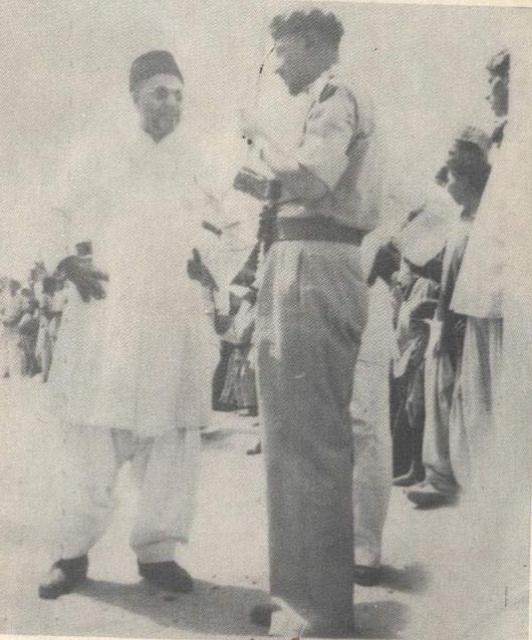
Third Caliph of the Ahmadiyya Muslim Jama'at Mirza Nasir Ahmad conversing with Furqan Force colonel Sahibzada Mubarak Ahmad

The Ahmadiyya Muslim Jama'at staunchly supported Jinnah's separatist demand for Pakistan, such as Chaudary Zafarullah Khan, an Ahmadi leader, who drafted the Lahore Resolution and was aked by Jinnah to represent the Muslim League to the Radcliffe Commission. Ahmadis argued to try to ensure that the city of Qadian, India would fall into the newly created state of Pakistan, though they were unsuccessful in doing so.

In the first decade after Pakistan gained independence after the partition of India, "Pakistan considered its history to be a part of larger India's, a common history, a joint history, and in fact Indian textbooks were in use in the syllabus in Pakistan." The government under Ayub Khan, however, wished to rewrite the history of Pakistan to exclude any reference to India and tasked the historians within Pakistan to manufacture a nationalist narrative of a "separate" history that erased the country's Indian past. Elizabeth A. Cole of the George Mason University Jimmy and Rosalynn Carter School for Peace and Conflict Resolution noted that Pakistani textbooks eliminate the country's Hindu and Buddhist past, while referring to Muslims as a monolithic entity and focusing solely on the advent of Islam in the Indian subcontinent.

During the rule of General Muhammad Zia-ul-Haq a "program of Islamisation" of the country including the textbooks was started. General Zia's 1979 education policy stated that "[the] highest priority would be given to the revision of the curricula with a view to reorganising the entire content around Islamic thought and giving education an ideological orientation so that Islamic ideology permeates the thinking of the younger generation and helps them with the necessary conviction and ability to refashion society according to Islamic tenets". Muhammad Ali Jinnah also claimed the Pakistani separatist movement to have started when the first Muslim put a foot in the Gateway of Islam, and that Muhammad Bin Qasim is actually the founder of Pakistan.

=== Pakistan as inheritor state to Islamic political powers in medieval India ===
The idea of Pakistan implied that Pakistan would be the modern extension or the successor state of Islamic empires and kingdoms that ruled medieval India for almost a combined period of one millennium, the empires and kingdoms in order are the Ghaznavid Empire, Ghorid Kingdom, Delhi Sultanate, Deccan sultanates and Mughal Empire. This history of Muslim rule in the subcontinent composes possibly the largest segment of Pakistani nationalism. Pakistani historians such as Ishtiaq Hussain Qureshi based Pakistani nationhood on the distinctiveness of medieval Indo-Muslim culture or civilisation, and that Pakistan was an heir to the Indo-Muslim traditions of the Sultanates. Indo-Muslim culture is described that by assimilating many aspects of Indian culture in customs, social manners, architecture, painting and music, the Muslims of India established a new culture or civilisation, which not only maintained its separate identity from other Muslim peoples such as the Arabs and the Persians, etc., but also simultaneously maintained the distinctiveness of this new culture from the former Hindu India by being essentially Indo-Persian in character. This is seen as a conscious decision of the Muslims of India. According to Qureshi, the distinctiveness of Muslim India could only be maintained by the political domination of the Muslims over the Hindus. Any sharing of political power with the Hindus was considered dangerous and the first step towards the political abdication of the Indian Muslims. The assumption of the Muslims of India of belonging to a separate identity, and therefore, having a right to their own country, also rested on their pre-eminent claim to political power, which flowed from the experience of Muslim dominance in India.

Such approach to history is encapsulated in the document Pakistan Nationalism, that General Ayub Khan issued as an order in 1961 to Islamise the armed forces and the public:

It would not be quite logical to say that the notion of Pakistan came into being only with the establishment of Pakistan on 14 August 1947. Its roots go very deep into our history. In fact, it was a concept which evolved and emerged in course of time, as a result of the inevitable and unalterable forces of history... . Amongst the first settlers of course were the Arabs who came with trade convoys, or with the armies of Mohammad Bin Qasim, and found a footing in Sind. The impress of the stay of these Arabs can still be recognised on the religion, culture and language of the Sindhi people.

To this end, many Pakistani nationalists claim monuments like the Taj Mahal, located in Agra, which was built by Ustad Ahmad Lahori, an ethnic Punjabi Muslim, as being Pakistani and part of Pakistan's history. The Red Fort, and the Jama Masjid, Delhi are also claimed by Pakistani nationalists as belonging to Pakistanis.

=== Syed Ahmed Khan and the Indian Rebellion of 1857 ===
See also: Syed Ahmed Khan, Indian rebellion of 1857

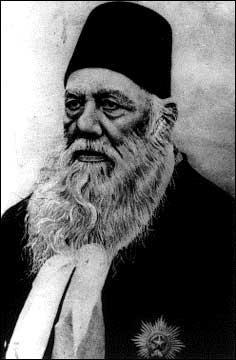
Sir Syed Ahmed Khan (1817–1898)

Syed Ahmed Khan, the grandson of the Mughal Vizier, Dabir-ud-Daula, believed that Muslims and Hindus belonged to two separate nations. He promoted Western-style education in Muslim society, seeking to uplift Muslims economically and politically in British India. He founded the Aligarh Muslim University, then called the Anglo-Oriental College.

In 1835 Lord Macaulay's minute recommending that Western rather than Oriental learning predominate in the East India Company's education policy had led to numerous changes. In place of Arabic and Persian, the Western languages, history and philosophy were taught at state-funded schools and universities whilst religious education was barred. English became not only the medium of instruction but also the official language in 1835 in place of Persian, disadvantaging those who had built their careers around the latter language. Traditional Islamic studies were no longer supported by the state, and some madrasahs lost their waqf or endowment. The Indian rebellion of 1857 is held by nationalists to have ended in disaster for the Muslims, as Bahadur Shah Zafar, the last Mughal, was deposed. Power over the subcontinent was passed from the East India Company to the British Crown. The removal of the last symbol of continuity with the Mughal period spawned a negative attitude amongst some Muslims towards everything modern and western, and a disinclination to make use of the opportunities available under the new regime. As Muslims were generally agriculturists and soldiers, while Hindus were increasingly seen as successful financiers and businessmen, the historian Spear noted that to the Muslim "an industrialised India meant a Hindu India".

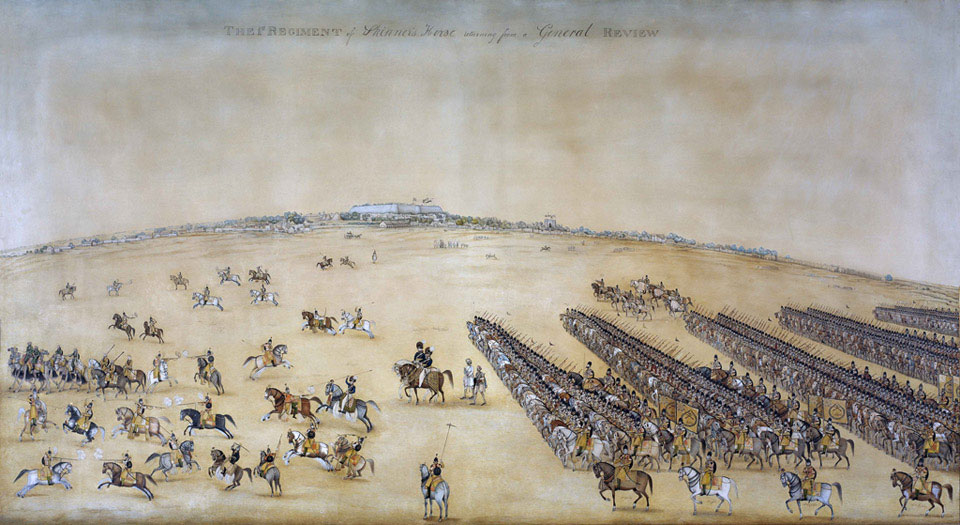
Indian Muslims of the 3rd Bengal Cavalry spearheaded the Indian Mutiny in Meerut

Seeing this atmosphere of despair and despondency, Syed launched his attempts to revive the spirit of progress within the Muslim community of India. He was convinced that the Muslims, in their attempt to regenerate themselves, had failed to realise that mankind had entered a very important phase of its existence, i.e., an era of science and learning. He knew that the realisation of that was the source of progress and prosperity for the British. Therefore, modern education became the pivot of his movement for regeneration of the Indian Muslims. He tried to transform the Muslim outlook from a mediaeval one to a modern one. Syed's first and foremost objective was to acquaint the British with the Indian mind; his next goal was to open the minds of his countrymen to European literature, science and technology. Therefore, in order to attain these goals, Syed launched the Aligarh Movement, of which Aligarh was the center. He had two immediate objectives in mind: to remove the state of misunderstanding and tension between the Muslims and the new British government, and to induce them to go after the opportunities available under the new regime without deviating in any way from the fundamentals of their faith.

Syed Ahmed Khan converted the existing cultural and religious entity among Indian Muslims into a separatist political force, throwing a Western cloak of nationalism over the Islamic concept of culture. The distinct sense of value, culture and tradition among Indian Muslims, which originated from the nature of Islamisation of the Indian populace during the Muslim conquests in the Indian subcontinent, was used for a separatist identity leading to the Pakistan Movement.

== Independence of Pakistan ==
In the Indian rebellion of 1857, both Hindu and Muslims fought the forces allied with the British Empire in different parts of British India. The war's spark arose because the British attacked the "Beastly customs of Indians" by forcing the Indian sepoys to handle Enfield P-53 gun cartridges greased with lard taken from slaughtered pigs and tallow taken from slaughtered cows. The cartridges had to bitten open to use the gunpowder, effectively meaning that sepoys would have to bite the lard and tallow. This was a manifestation of the insensitivity that the British exhibited to Muslim and Hindu religious traditions, such as the rejection of pork consumption in Islam and the rejection of slaughter of cow in Hinduism. There were also some kingdoms and peoples who supported the British. Historians such as Shashi Tharoor maintain that the British government's divide-and-rule policies in India were established after witnessing Hindus and Muslims joining forces together to fight against Company rule in India during this First War of Indian Independence.

The desire among some for a new state for the Indian Muslims, or Azadi was born with Kernal Sher Khan, who looked to Muslim history and heritage, and condemned the fact Muslims were ruled by the British Empire and not by Muslim leaders. The idea of complete independence did not catch on until after World War I, when the British government reduced civil liberties with the Rowlatt Acts of 1919. When General Reginal Dyer ordered the Jallianwala Bagh Massacre in Amritsar, Punjab which took place in the same year, the Muslim public was outraged and most of the Muslim political leaders turned against the British government. Pakistan was finally actualised through the partition of India in 1947 on the basis of Two Nation Theory. Today, Pakistan is divided into 4 provinces. The last census recorded the 1981 population at 84.3 million, nearly double the 1961 figure of 42.9 million. By 1983, the population had tripled to nearly 93 million, making Pakistan the world's 9th most populous country, although in area it ranked 34th.

== Pakistani nationalist symbols ==
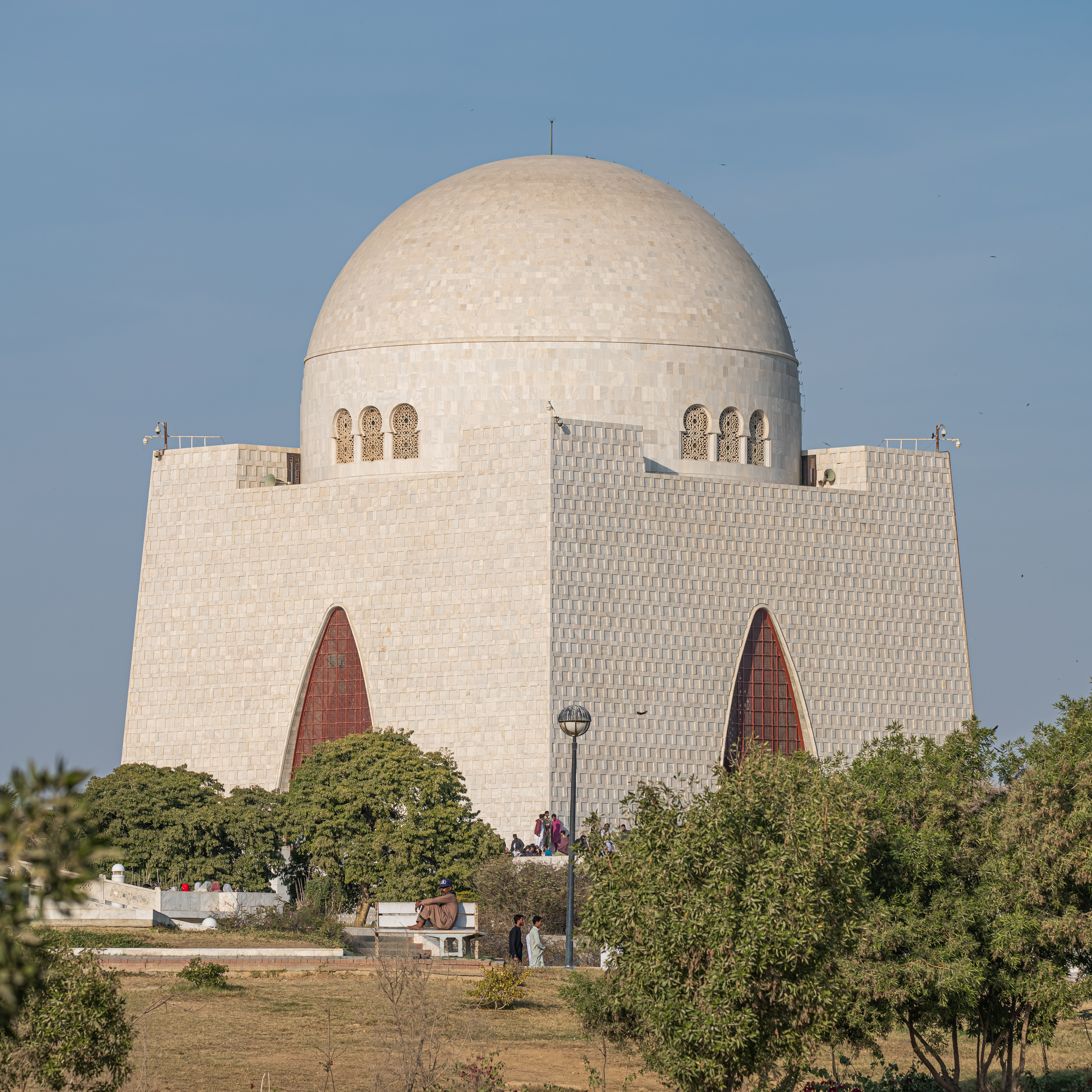
Mausoleum of M.A Jinnah is frequently visited by Pakistani nationalists, It is a national symbol of Pakistan.

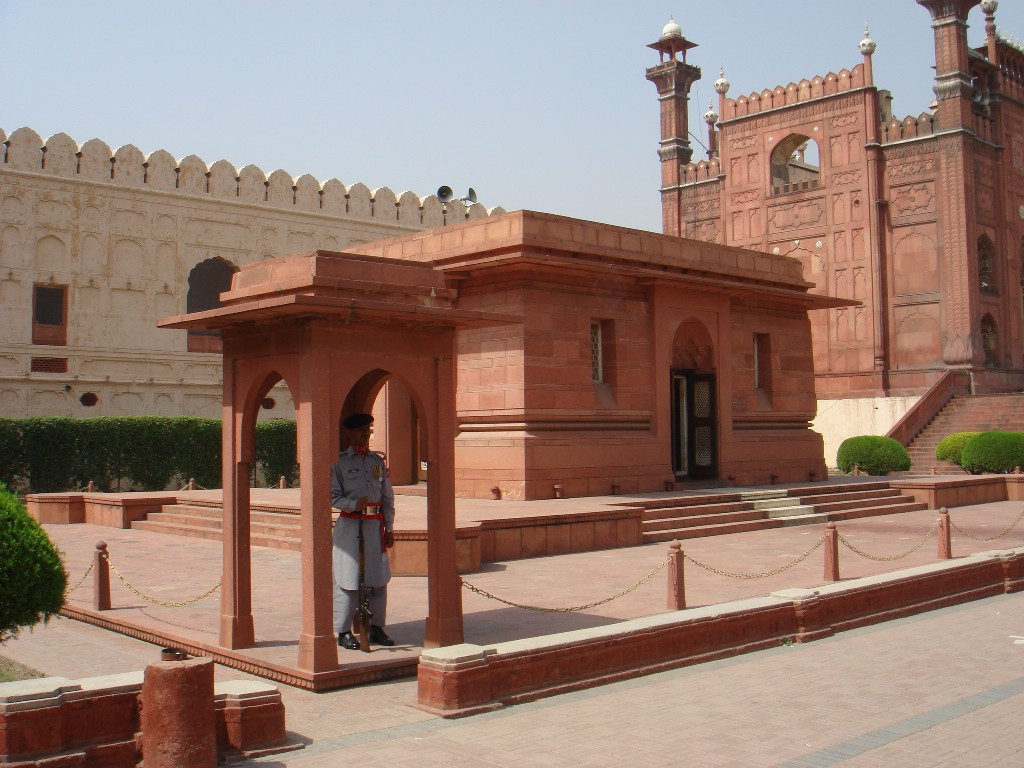
The Mausoleum of Iqbal, next to Badshahi Masjid, Lahore, Pakistan

Because of the country's identity with Islam, mosques like Badshahi Mosque and Faisal Mosque are also used as national symbols either to represent "glorious past" or modernistic future. Pakistan has many shrines, sights, sounds and symbols that have significance to Pakistani nationalists. These include the Shrines of Political leaders of pre-independence and post-independence Pakistan, Shrines of Religious leaders and Saints, The Shrines of Imperial leaders of various Islamic Empires and Dynasties, as well as national symbols of Pakistan. Some of these shrines, sights and symbols have become a places of Pilgrimage for Pakistani ultra-nationalism and militarism, as well as for obviously religious purposes.

The older ten rupee notes of the Pakistani rupee included background images of the remains of Mohenjo-daro and Harappa. In the 1960s, the imagery of Gandharan and Greco-Buddhist artefacts were unearthed in Pakistan, and some Pakistani nationalists "creatively imagined" an ancient civilisation which differentiated the provinces now lying in Pakistan from the rest of the Indian subcontinent, which is not accepted by mainstream historians; they tried to emphasise its contacts with the West and framed Gandharan Buddhism as antithetical to 'Brahmin' (Hindu) influence.

== Nationalism and politics ==
The political identity of the Pakistani Armed Forces, Pakistan's largest institution and one which controlled the government for over half the history of modern-day Pakistan and still does, is reliant on the connection to Pakistan's Imperial past. The Pakistan Muslim League's fortunes up till the 1970s were propelled by its legacy as the flagship of the Pakistan Movement, and the core platform of the party today evokes that past, considering itself to be the guardian of Pakistan's freedom, democracy and unity as well as religion. Other parties have arisen, such as Pakistan Peoples Party, once advocating a leftist program and now more centrist. In contrast, the Muttahida Majlis-e-Amal employs a more aggressively theocratic nationalistic expression. The MMA seeks to defend the culture and heritage of Pakistan and the majority of its people, the Muslim population. It ties theocratic nationalism with the aggressive defence of Pakistan's borders and interests against India, with the defence of the majority's right to be a majority.

Ethnic nationalist parties include the Awami National Party, which is closely identified with the creation of a Pashtun-majority state in North-West Frontier Province and the Federally Administered Tribal Areas includes many Pashtun leaders in its organisation. However, the Awami National Party, At the last legislative elections, 20 October 2002, won a meagre 1.0% of the popular vote and no seats in the lower house of Parliament. In Balochistan, the Balochistan National Party uses the legacy of the independent Balochistan to stir up support, However at the legislative elections, 20 October 2002, the party won only 0.2% of the popular vote and 1 out of 272 elected members.

Almost every Pakistani state has a regional party devoted solely to the culture of the native people. Unlike the Awami National party and the Balochistan national party, these mostly cannot be called nationalist, as they use regionalism as a strategy to garner votes, building on the frustration of common people with official status and the centralisation of government institutions in Pakistan. However, the recent elections as well as history have shown that such ethnic nationalist parties rarely win more than 1% of the popular vote, with the overwhelming majority of votes going to large and established political parties that pursue a national agenda as opposed to regionalism.

=== Military tradition ===
The political ethos in Pakistan, since its first military regime in 1958, reveals that the Pakistani military has incrementally acquired an institutional identity and role which is the supra-governmental and transcends all other constitutional governance arrangements in Pakistan. The Pakistani Army had declared itself, the ideological guardian of the two-nation theory which Pakistanis believe to be the basis of Pakistan's national foundation. It has become the final repository responsible for protecting and consolidating its nationhood. According to Dixit, the Pakistan Army claims to be the shadow of God responsible for exercising state sovereignty for the welfare of the Pakistani people, of which it claims to be the most competent judge. Early Muslim thinkers viewed the idea of Pakistan, with its strong military tradition, as a guardian of South Asia. In subsequent years Pakistani strategists came to see Pakistan as a balance to both the Soviet Union from Central Asia and the pro-Soviet government of India.

In a June 2023 survey titled "National Public Opinion Poll Report", Gallup Pakistan found that the military remained the institution Pakistanis trust the most, with 88% of approval, ahead of the media and the judiciary, with 56% for both, in Khyber Pakhtunkhwa the approval for the army reaching its highest at 91% followed by Punjab with 90% with a lowest of 66% in Balochistan.

== Nuclear power ==
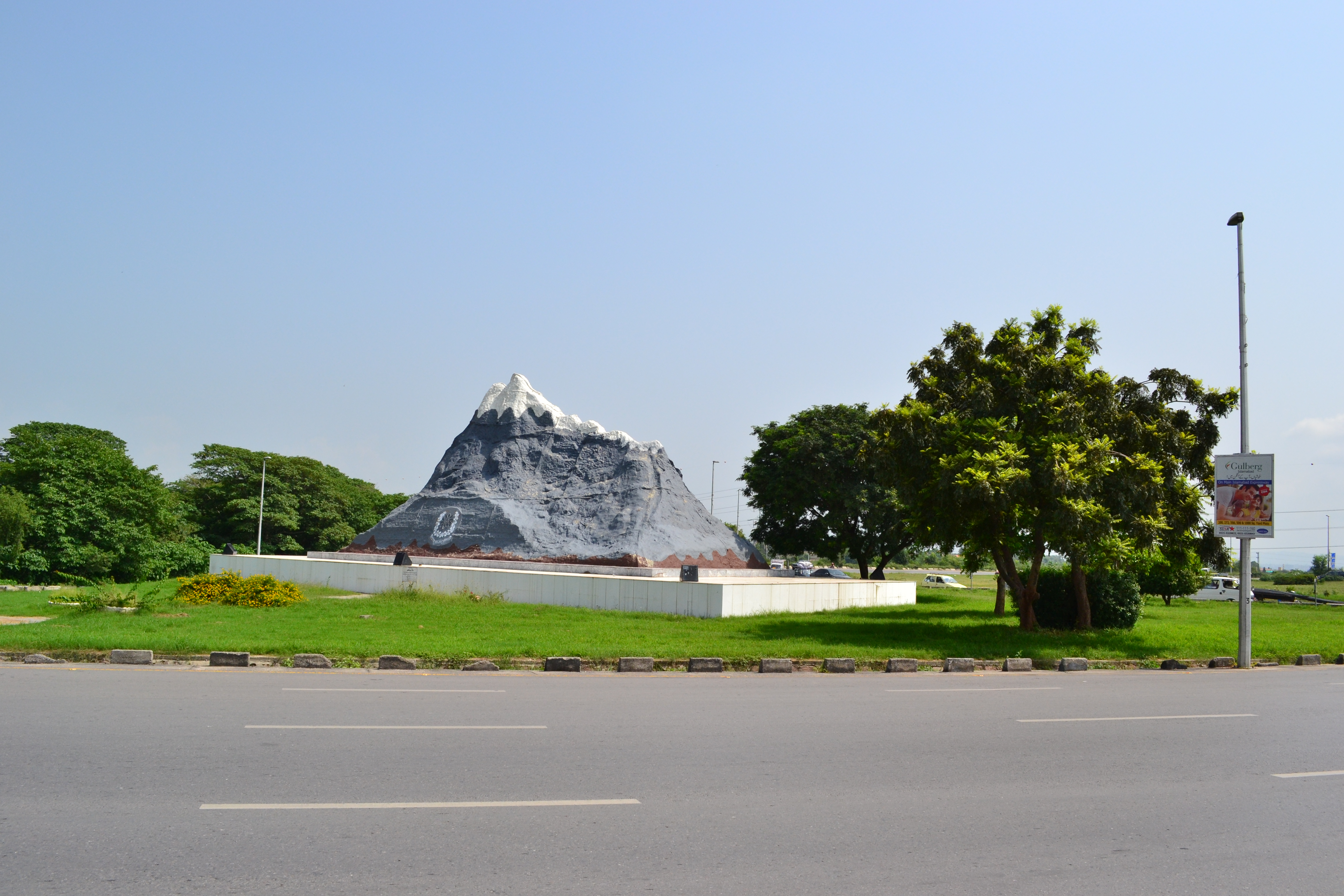
Monument of a nuclear test site placed in Islamabad.

The intense guerrilla war in far Eastern Pakistan, followed by India's successful intervention led to the secession of Eastern contingent as Bangladesh. The outcomes of the war played a crucial role in the civil society. In January 1972, a clandestine crash programme and a spin-off to literary and the scientific revolution as response to that crash programme led Pakistan becoming the nuclear power.

First public tests were experimented out in 1998 (code names:Chagai-I and Chagai-II) in a direct response to India's nuclear explosions in the same year; thus Pakistan became the 7th nation in the world to have successfully developed the programme. It is postulated that Pakistan's crash programme arose in 1970 and mass acceleration took place following the India's nuclear test in 1974. It also resulted in Pakistan pursuing similar ambitions, resulting in the May 1998 testings of five nuclear devices by India and six as a response by Pakistan, opening a new era in their rivalry. Pakistan, along with Israel and India, is three of the original states that have restrained itself from being party of the NPT and CTBT which it considers an encroachment on its right to defend itself. To date, Pakistan is the only Muslim nuclear state.

== Self-identity as Muslims first ==
Because Pakistani nationalism is based on Muslim nationalism, many Pakistanis see no conflict in identifying themselves as Muslim before identifying as Pakistanis.

For example, in 2011 a Gilani Poll conducted by Gallup Pakistan revealed that 59% of the Pakistani citizens identified as Muslim first, while 22% chose Pakistani, 10% went for their provincial identity and 7% as human beings first. On the other hand, the same year Pew Research Center found out that 94% of Pakistanis considered themselves Muslim first, 3% Pakistani first and 3% voted for both.

In 2017, the UNDP Pakistan – National Human Development Report broke it down at provincial level as such, basing themselves on the 2015 National Youth Perception Survey :

Administrative unit	Religion first	Nationality first	Other (ethnicity, ...) first
Punjab	51.4%	41.2%	7.4%
Sindh	32.6%	46.7%	20.8%
Khyber Pakhtunkhwa	50%	41.5%	8.5%
Balochistan	38.8%	40%	21.2%
FATA	5%	78.7%	16.3%
Azad Jammu and Kashmir	7.6%	86.8%	5.6%
Islamabad Capital Territory	27.6%	64.9%	7.5%
Gilgit-Baltistan	3.6%	95.7%	0.7%

== See also ==
- Muslim nationalism in South Asia
- Dil Dil Pakistan
- Pakistan Zindabad
- Politics of Pakistan
