= Two-state solution (disambiguation) =

The two-state solution is a proposed approach to resolving the Israeli–Palestinian conflict.

Two-state solution may also refer to:

- Two-state solution (Cyprus) – Proposed diplomatic solution for the Cyprus dispute, between Turkish Republic of Northern Cyprus (TRNC) and Republic of Cyprus
- Two state solution (California), a proposal to split California into two states by California State Assembly minority leader James Gallagher in 2025
- Netherlands-Indonesia Union – Confederation of the Netherlands and Indonesia (1949–56)
- Two-state solution (Yemen), proposal to divide Yemen into northern and southern states

== See also ==
- Two-nation theory – Indian political ideology, separatism in colonial British India
- Two Nations theory (disambiguation)
- Two-state (disambiguation)
- One Country on Each Side, a concept articulated in the Democratic Progressive Party government led by Chen Shui-bian.
