= Two Nations theory =

The Two Nations theory can refer to:

- Two-Nation Theory, the view that Muslims and Hindus in Colonial India were separate nations
- Two nations theory (Ireland), the view that the Northern Ireland Protestants are a distinct Irish nation
- Deux nations or Two Solitudes (Canadian society), the view that French and English Canada are separate nations
- Two-states theory, and One Country on Each Side – Concept on the political status of Taiwan

== See also ==
- Austro-Hungarian Compromise of 1867
- Biculturalism
- Binational solution, sometimes known as
- Dualism (disambiguation)
- Hyphen War
- Multinational state
- Parallel state
- Taksim (politics)
- Two Chinas
- The two Spains
- Two-state solution (disambiguation)
  - Two-state solution (Israel and Palestine)
  - Two-state solution (Cyprus)
- Two-state (disambiguation)
