= Two-state =

Two-state (or variants) may refer to:

- Two-state quantum system, in physics
- Two-state trajectory in biophysics
- 2 States: The Story of My Marriage, a novel by Chetan Bhagat
  - 2 States (2014 film), a Bollywood film based on the novel
  - 2 States (soundtrack), soundtrack by Shankar–Ehsaan–Loy for the film
- 2 States (2020 film), an Indian Malayalam-language film
- Two Chinas
- Special state-to-state relations, also called "Two-state theory", proposed by Lee Teng-hui in 1999.

== See also ==
- Two Nations theory (disambiguation)
- Two-state solution (disambiguation)
