= 2 States (soundtrack) =

Soundtrack album by Shankar–Ehsaan–Loy
- Released: 16 March 2014
- Recorded: 2013–2014
- Genre: Feature film soundtrack
- Length: 25:06
- Label: T-Series
- Producer: Shankar–Ehsaan–Loy

Shankar–Ehsaan–Loy chronology
| Darr @ the Mall (2014) | 2 States (2014) | Kill Dil (2014) |

2 States is the soundtrack to the 2014 film of the same name directed by Abhishek Varman based on Chetan Bhagat's novel 2 States: The Story of My Marriage. Starring Arjun Kapoor and Alia Bhatt, the film produced by Dharma Productions and Nadiadwala Grandson Entertainment. The film's soundtrack consisted of seven songs composed by Shankar–Ehsaan–Loy, who had recurringly composed for Dharma Productions' films, and had lyrics written by Amitabh Bhattacharya. Varman wanted the trio to score the film in the first place in order to create a romantic album that "has soul and young energy" and have a longer shelf-life.

The soundtrack was released by T-Series on 16 March 2014 to generally positive reviews from critics. Shankar–Ehsaan–Loy won Filmfare and IIFA awards for his work in the film, while the album itself received accolades in several ceremonies. The song "Mast Magan" enjoyed widespread commercial success, with other tracks being declared as chartbusters.

== Release ==
2 States' soundtrack was preceded by three singles, that were released along with the music videos accompanying. The track "Offo" was sung by Aditi Singh Sharma and Amitabh Bhattacharya, was the first to be released on 7 March 2014. The second song "Locha-E-Ulfat" was released on 13 March, and the third song "Mast Magan" was released on 15 March, while its music video was released later. In an interview with Bollywood Hungama, the leading lady of the film Alia Bhatt stated that the song is one of her personal favorites from the film. The soundtrack was released through digital platforms on 16 March 2014. Post-release, the tracks "Iski Uski" and "Chandaaniya" were released on 3 and 9 April.

== Track listing ==
Track list
| No. | Title | Singers | Length |
|---|---|---|---|
| 1. | "Offo" | Aditi Singh Sharma, Amitabh Bhattacharya | 3:34 |
| 2. | "Locha-E-Ulfat" | Benny Dayal | 4:48 |
| 3. | "Mast Magan" | Arijit Singh, Chinmayi | 4:40 |
| 4. | "Chaandaniya" | K. Mohan, Yashita Sharma | 4:07 |
| 5. | "Hullaa Re" | Shankar Mahadevan, Siddharth Mahadevan, Rasika Shekar | 3:41 |
| 6. | "Iski Uski" | Akriti Kakkar, Shahid Mallya, Shankar Mahadevan | 4:14 |
| 7. | "Isayin Alai" | Mahalaxmi Iyer | 2:35 |
| Total length: | | | 25:06 |

== Reception ==
Vipin Nair of Music Aloud gave 7.5 out of 10 stars calling it "not as brilliant as Shankar Ehsaan Loy’s last few soundtracks, but still one of the better works they have produced for Dharma Productions." In her 3-star review, Purva Khole of Bollywood Life wrote "Though this album isn’t one of the best ones by Shankar Ehsaan Loy, it is a relief to see the trio back in action". Aishwarya of Koimoi rated 3.5 out of 5 saying "If the past few releases did not stand up to your expectations in Hindi Film music, this is worth the try to bring a fanatic’s faith back on. For once, the entire album can be judged without selective prejudice."

Joginder Tuteja of Rediff.com wrote "Last year, Shankar-Ehsaan-Loy had done quite well with Bhaag Milkha Bhaag. With the score of 2 States, they make a re-entry into the Karan-Sajid camp. Amitabh Bhattacharya has written some interesting lyrics. With aggressive promotion and its inherent good quality, the music of 2 States should do well." In a mixed review, Sankhayan Ghosh of The Indian Express rated two-and-a-half out of five saying "While this (Hulla) and Locha-e-Ulfat will sit atop any favourite list this year, the remaining songs of 2 States have their moments but still fall short of the composers’ talent." Rajiv Vijayakar of Bollywood Hungama said that "Shankar-Ehsaan-Loy's score is unusual and fresh in many aspects". Bryan Durham of The Times of India rated 4 out of 5 saying "With three tracks on the Top 20 chart and quite a few songs that are sure to find place in your personal playlists, SEL’s music has found its winning groove."

== Accolades ==
| Award | Date of ceremony (Note: Date is linked to the article about the awards held that year, wherever possible.) | Category | Recipient(s) and nominee(s) | Result | Ref. |
|---|---|---|---|---|---|
| BIG Star Entertainment Awards | 18 December 2014 | Most Entertaining Music Director | Shankar–Ehsaan–Loy | Won | |
| Bollywood Hungama Surfers Choice Music Awards | 14 January 2015 | Best Soundtrack | 2 States – Shankar–Ehsaan–Loy | Nominated | |
| Bollywood Hungama Surfers Choice Music Awards | 14 January 2015 | Best Male Playback Singer | Arijit Singh – ("Mast Magan") | Nominated | |
| Bollywood Hungama Surfers Choice Music Awards | 14 January 2015 | Best Male Playback Singer | Benny Dayal – ("Locha-E-Ulfat") | Nominated | |
| Bollywood Hungama Surfers Choice Music Awards | 14 January 2015 | Best Lyricist | Amitabh Bhattacharya – ("Mast Magan") | Nominated | |
| Filmfare Awards | 31 January 2015 | Best Music Director | Shankar–Ehsaan–Loy | Won | |
| Filmfare Awards | 31 January 2015 | Best Male Playback Singer | Arijit Singh – ("Mast Magan") | Nominated | |
| Filmfare Awards | 31 January 2015 | Best Male Playback Singer | Benny Dayal – ("Locha-E-Ulfat") | Nominated | |
| Global Indian Music Academy Awards | 24 February 2015 | Best Music Director | Shankar–Ehsaan–Loy | Nominated | |
| Global Indian Music Academy Awards | 24 February 2015 | Best Background Score | Tubby–Parik | Nominated | |
| Global Indian Music Academy Awards | 24 February 2015 | Best Lyricist | Amitabh Bhattacharya – ("Mast Magan") | Nominated | |
| Global Indian Music Academy Awards | 24 February 2015 | Best Film Song | "Mast Magan" | Nominated | |
| Global Indian Music Academy Awards | 24 February 2015 | Best Film Album | 2 States – Shankar–Ehsaan–Loy | Nominated | |
| Global Indian Music Academy Awards | 24 February 2015 | Best Engineer – Film Album | Tanay Gajjar | Nominated | |
| International Indian Film Academy Awards | 7 June 2015 | Best Music Director | Shankar–Ehsaan–Loy | Won | |
| Mirchi Music Awards | 27 February 2015 | Album of The Year | 2 States – Shankar–Ehsaan–Loy | Won | |
| Mirchi Music Awards | 27 February 2015 | Music Composer of The Year | Shankar–Ehsaan–Loy – ("Mast Magan") | Won | |
| Mirchi Music Awards | 27 February 2015 | Song representing Sufi tradition | "Mast Magan" | Nominated | |
| Mirchi Music Awards | 27 February 2015 | Best Background Score | Tubby–Parik | Nominated | |
