= Pakistanism =

Division of a society along religious lines

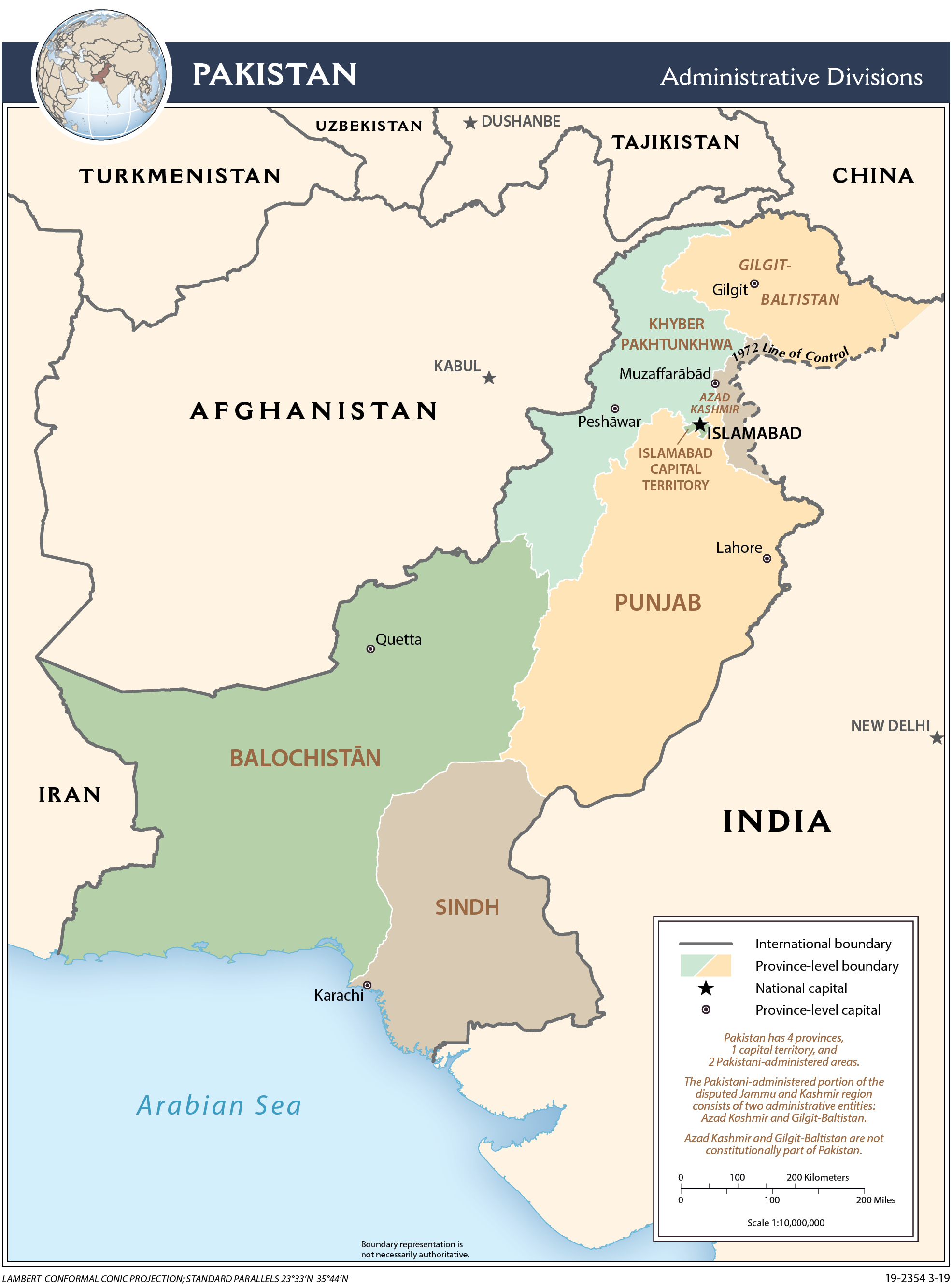
Map of Pakistan

Pakistanism or Pakistanization is a neologism that refers to the continual division of any society along religious lines, with reference to the Partition of British-ruled India in 1947.

== Similar situations in other countries ==
Some West Africans were inspired by the Indian independence movement. In 1920, educated West Africans formed the National Congress of British West Africa, which modeled its name on the Indian National Congress. According to Ali Mazrui, the facet of the Indian independence movement West Africans found most admirable was the Indian peoples' unity during the struggle. In 1936, H. O. Davies said,

"Africans should follow India – the only way is for Africans to co-operate and make sacrifices in the struggle for freedom."

According to Ali Mazrui,

"But the emergence of the Muslim League in India as a serious secessionist movement soon shattered the myth of unity in the Indian model. A new word entered the vocabulary of West African nationalism – the word was 'pakistanism'."

Ghana's Kwame Nkrumah and Nigeria's Nnamdi Azikiwe became concerned about possible Pakistanization in their respective countries and Africa as a whole. The Convention People's Party's 1954 Election Manifesto contain the following message:

"We have seen the tragedy of religious communalism in India and elsewhere. Don't let us give it a chance to take root and flourish in Ghana. Down with Pakistanism!"

In Europe, Alija Izetbegović, later the first President of the Presidency of the Republic of Bosnia and Herzegovina, cited Pakistan as a model in his Islamic Declaration, written in the late 1960s and published in 1970. Historian Vjekoslav Perica writes that the Declaration "designated Pakistan as a model country to be emulated by Muslim revolutionaries worldwide", and Faisal Devji describes Izetbegović as the only Muslim politician outside South Asia to have been inspired by Pakistan's model of Muslim nationalism. The Declaration does not mention Bosnia or Yugoslavia. Historian Noel Malcolm characterises it as a general treatise on Islam and politics addressed to the Muslim world, and describes the Serb nationalist reading of it, which presented it as a programme for an Islamic state in Bosnia, as false propaganda. The defences of Radovan Karadžić and Ratko Mladić later invoked the Declaration at the International Criminal Tribunal for the former Yugoslavia.

== Nigeria ==
Pakistanism became a concern in Nigeria's independence movement. The primary subdivisions of Nigeria consisted of the Hausa–Fulani-dominated Northern Region, the Yoruba-dominated Western Region, and the Igbo-dominated Eastern Region. In addition to these ethnic differences, the Northern Region was primarily Muslim, while the Western and Eastern regions were primarily Christian. In the 1950s, the Northern Region threatened to secede. Godfrey Mwakikagile noted that it was the Northern region that was the first region threatening to secede. At the 1950 General Conference at Ibadan, Northern Region delegates demanded 50% of the seats in Nigeria's legislature and threatened secession otherwise. In 1958, Nnamdi Azikiwe said:

"It is essential that ill-will be not created in order to encourage a Pakistan in this country."

The original goal of the countercoup against the government of Johnson Aguiyi-Ironsi on July 29, 1966, was to facilitate the Northern Region's secession from the rest of Nigeria.

== Sudan ==
In February 2011, Mazrui used the term to describe the division of the Sudan into Sudan proper, which is primarily Muslim, and South Sudan, which is primarily Christian and animistic.

== See also ==
- Balkanization
- Two-nation theory
