= Two-nation theory =

Indian political ideology

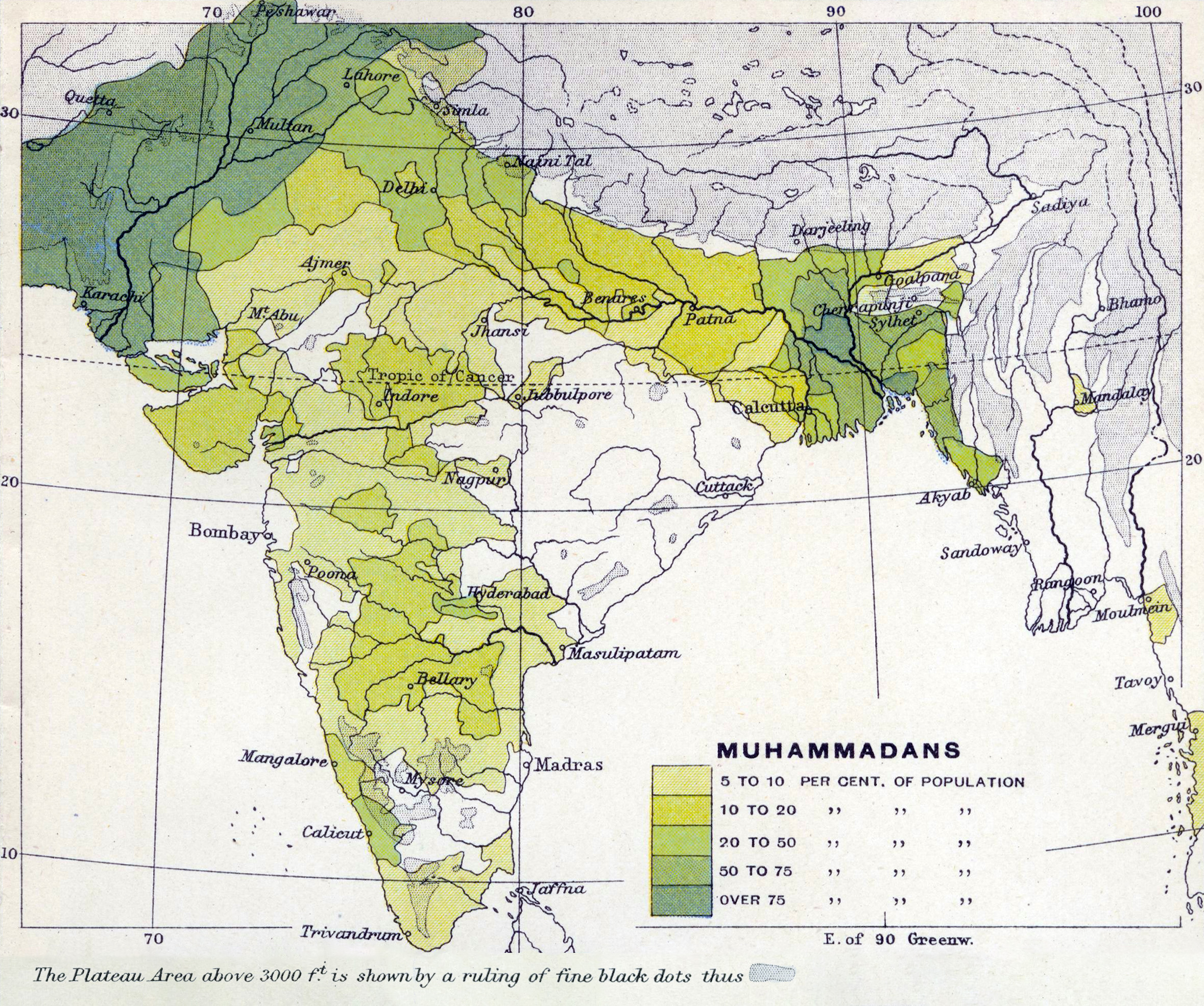
Map showing the Muslim population based on percentage in India, 1909

The two-nation theory was an ideology of religious nationalism that advocated Muslim nationhood, with a separate homeland for Indian Muslims within a decolonised British India, which ultimately led to the partition of India in 1947. Its various descriptions of religious differences were the main factor in Muslim separatist thought in the Indian subcontinent, asserting that Indian Muslims and Indian Hindus are two separate nations, each with their own customs, traditions, art, architecture, literature, interests, and ways of life.

The theory was adopted and promoted by the All-India Muslim League and Muhammad Ali Jinnah and became the basis of the Pakistan Movement. Hindu Mahasabha under the leadership of Vinayak Damodar Savarkar and Rashtriya Swayamsevak Sangh (RSS) supported the two-nation theory. According to them, Hindus and Muslim cannot live together so they favoured India to become a religious Hindu state. The two-nation theory argued for a different state for the Muslims of the British Indian Empire as Muslims would not be able to succeed politically in a Hindu-majority India; this interpretation nevertheless promised a democratic state where Muslims and non-Muslims would be treated equally. The two nation theory sought to establish a separate state for Indian Muslims from the northwestern provinces and Bengal region of colonial India. Pakistan claims to be the inheritor of the traditions of Muslim India, and the heir of the two-nation theory. Buddhist and Dalit activist, B R Ambedkar supported the theory and partition of India in the interest of safety of India. According to Ambedkar, the assumption that Hindus and Muslims could live under one state if they were distinct nations was but "an empty sermon, a mad project, to which no sane man would agree". Congress rejected the two-nation theory and opposed it even after the creation of Pakistan.

Apart from Congress, the opposition to the two-nation theory also came from a number of Hindus, and Muslims. They conceived India as a single Indian nation, of which Hindus and Muslims are two intertwined communities. The Republic of India officially rejected the two-nation theory and chose to be a secular state, enshrining the concepts of religious pluralism and composite nationalism in its constitution. Kashmir, a Muslim-majority region three-fifths of which is administered by the Republic of India, and the oldest dispute before the United Nations, is a venue for both competing ideologies of South Asian nationhood.

== Pre-Modern India ==
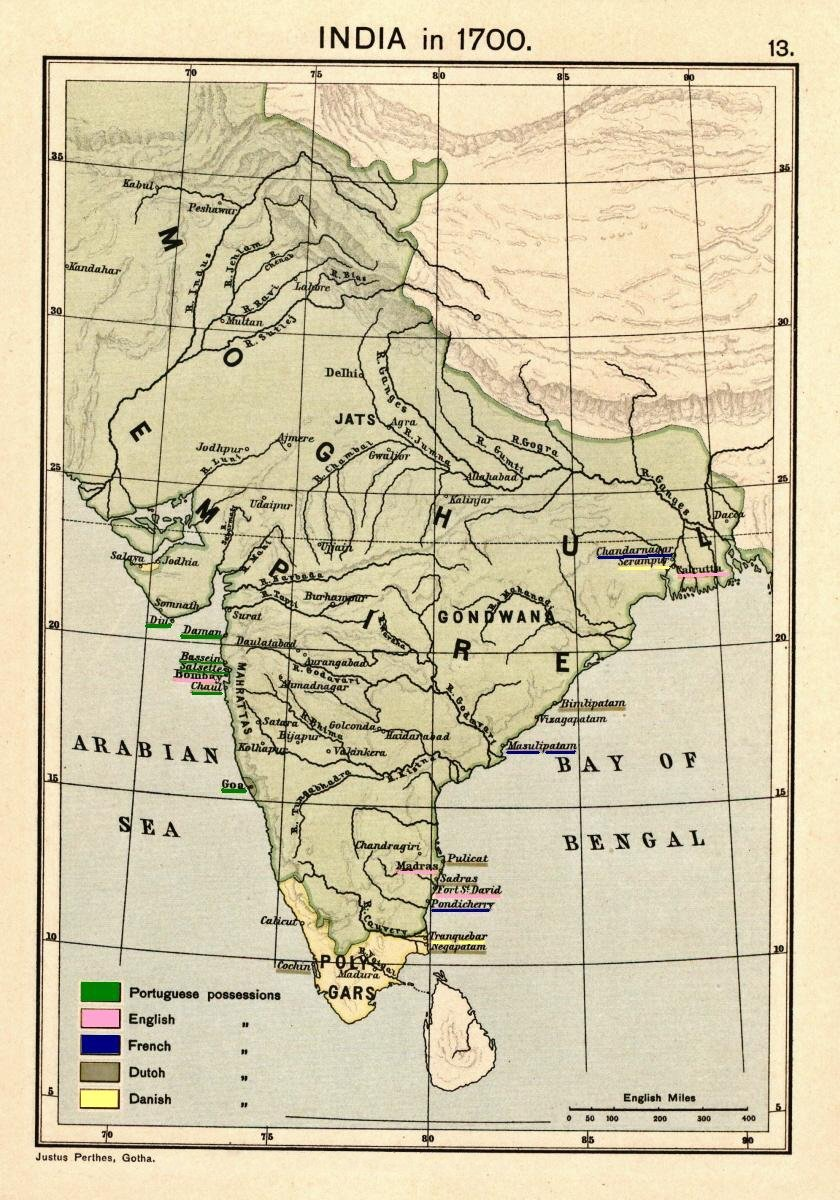
The Mughal Empire in 1700

Pakistani historians such as Ishtiaq Hussain Qureshi base the two-nation theory on the distinctiveness of medieval Indo-Muslim culture or civilization. It is described that by assimilating many aspects of Indian culture in customs, social manners, architecture, painting and music, the Muslims of India established a new distinct Indo-Muslim culture or civilization, which not only maintained its separate identity from other Muslim peoples such as the Arabs and the Persians, etc., but also simultaneously maintained the distinctiveness of this new culture from the former Hindu India by being essentially Indo-Persian in character. This is seen as a conscious decision of the Muslims of India. According to Qureshi, the distinctiveness of Muslim India could only be maintained by the political domination of the Muslims over the Hindus. Any sharing of political power with the Hindus was considered dangerous and the first step towards the political abdication of the Indian Muslims.

It is generally believed in Pakistan that the movement for Muslim self-awakening and identity was started by Ahmad Sirhindi (1564–1624), who fought against emperor Akbar's religious syncretist Din-i Ilahi movement and is thus considered "for contemporary official Pakistani historians" to be the founder of the two-nation theory, and was particularly intensified under the Muslim reformer Shah Waliullah (1703–1762) who, because he wanted to give back to Muslims their self-consciousness during the decline of the Mughal Empire and the rise of the non-Muslim powers like the Marathas, Jats and Sikhs, launched a mass-movement of the religious education which made "them conscious of their distinct nationhood which in turn culminated in the form of Two Nation Theory and ultimately the creation of Pakistan."

== Roots of Muslim separatism in Colonial India (17th century–1940s) ==
M. S. Jain and others have traced the origins of the two nation-theory to Syed Ahmed Khan and the Aligarh Movement, consisting of his followers such as Mohsin-ul-Mulk. Syed Ahmed Khan was the grandson of the Mughal Vizier of Akbar Shah II, Dabir-ud-Daula, while Mohsin-ul-Mulk belonged to a family that played an important part in shaping the fortunes of the Mughal Empire, known as the Sadaat-e-Bara, who had been de-facto sovereigns of the Mughal Empire in the 1710s.

Early Associates of Syed Ahmed Khan

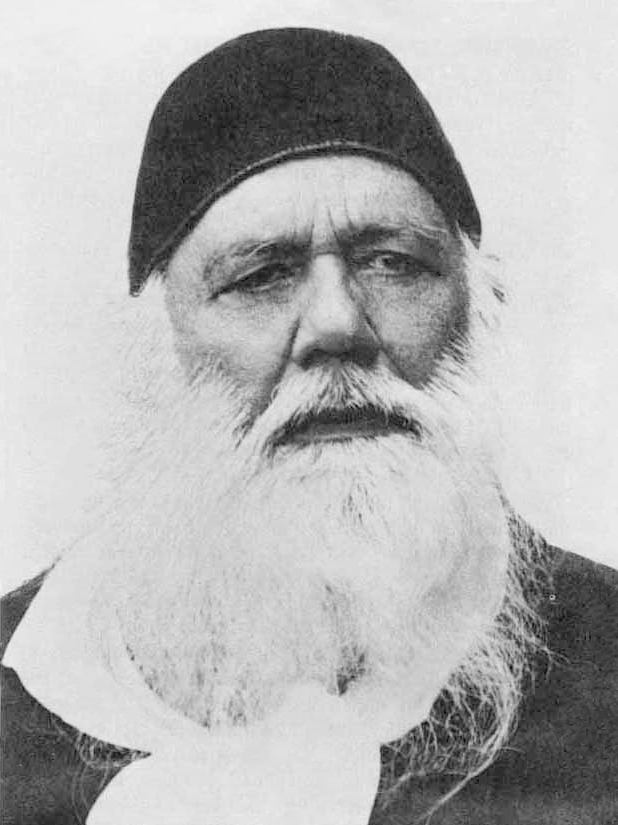
Syed Ahmed Khan

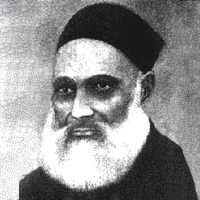
Waqar-ul-Mulk

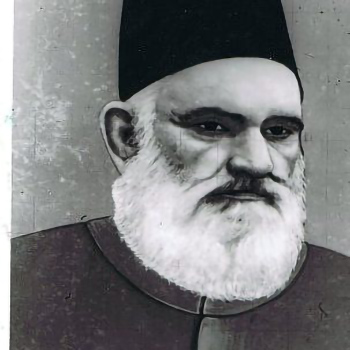
Mohsin-ul-Mulk

This feudal Indian Muslim service gentry, which performed both clerical and military service for the Mughal Empire and the British, provided cultural and literary patronage, which acted even after the fall of Muslim political power, as preservers of Indo-Persian traditions and values. They consisted of a group of feudal elites with an interest in preserving their power and position in relation to Hindus and the British. The resistance of Hindus towards the Urdu language prompted Syed Ahmed Khan and his associates to view Indian Muslims as not only having their own separate culture, but belonging to a separate nation, using the Urdu word, "Qawm". Syed Ahmed Khan provided a modern idiom in which to express the quest for Islamic identity, His concept of Indian Muslim identity placed great importance on nativity and the cultural values of Muslim India, and his writings became a dissemination of ideas about a national identity that was both Muslim and Indian.

Thus, many Pakistanis often quote modernist and reformist scholar Syed Ahmad Khan (1817–1898) as the architect of the two-nation theory. For instance, in 1876, Syed Ahmed Khan exclaimed when speaking at Benares:

“I am convinced now that Hindus and Muslims could never become one nation as their religion and way of life was quite distinct from each other. Now I am convinced that these communities will not join wholeheartedly in anything. At present there is no open hostility between the two communities but it will increase immensely in the future. He who lives, will see.”

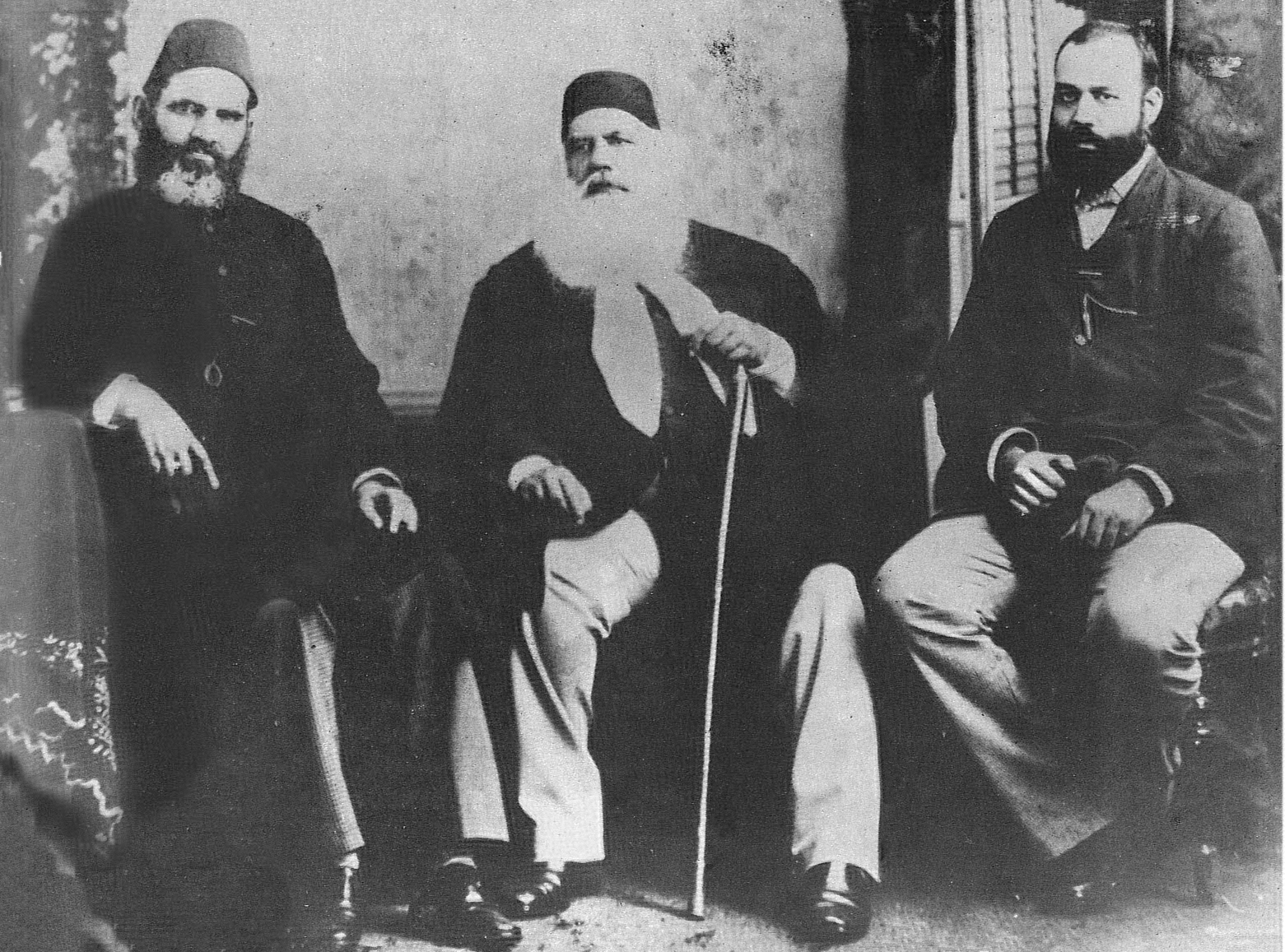
Syed Ahmed Khan, Mohsin-ul-Mulk and Syed Mahmud

In their view, Indo-Muslim culture had participants from certain sections of Hindus as well, who had been influenced a great deal by Indo-Muslim culture and had adopted some Muslim traditions during Muslim rule. However, the cultural ties with Hindus were scuttled due to Hindu revivalism after the advent of the British. The formation of the Indian National Congress was seen politically threatening and he dispensed with composite Indian nationalism. In an 1887 speech, he said:

Now suppose that all the English were to leave India—then who would be rulers of India? Is it possible that under these circumstances two nations, Mohammedan and Hindu, could sit on the same throne and remain equal in power? Most certainly not. It is necessary that one of them should conquer the other and thrust it down. To hope that both could remain equal is to desire the impossible and inconceivable.

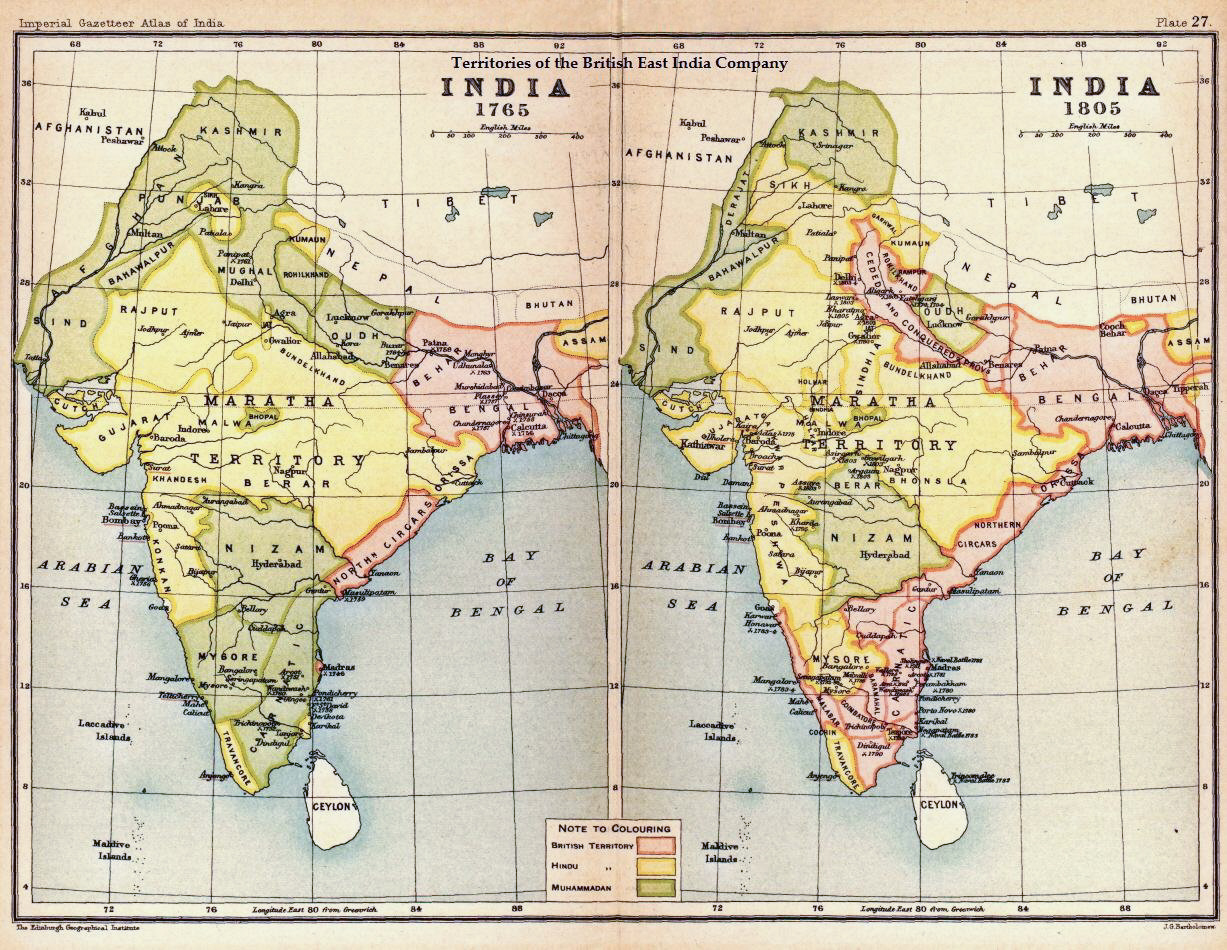
The changing Indian political scenario in the second half of the 18th century.

In 1888, in a critical assessment of the Indian National Congress, which promoted composite nationalism among all the castes and creeds of colonial India, he also considered Muslims to be a separate nationality among many others:

The aims and objects of the Indian National Congress are based upon an ignorance of history and present-day politics; they do not take into consideration that India is inhabited by different nationalities: they presuppose that the Muslims, the Marathas, the Brahmins, the Kshatriyas, the Banias, the Sudras, the Sikhs, the Bengalis, the Madrasis, and the Peshawaris can all be treated alike and all of them belong to the same nation. The Congress thinks that they profess the same religion, that they speak the same language, that their way of life and customs are the same... I consider the experiment which the Indian National Congress wants to make fraught with dangers and suffering for all the nationalities of India, especially for the Muslims.

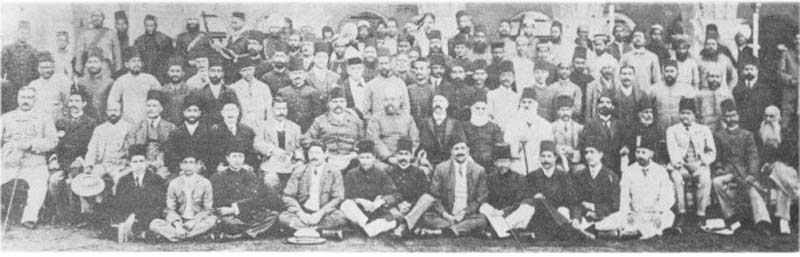
All India Muslim league conference, 1906

In 1925, during the Aligarh session of the All-India Muslim League, which he chaired, Justice Abdur Rahim (1867–1952) was one of the first to openly articulate on how Muslims and Hindu constitute two nations, and while it would become common rhetoric, later on, the historian S. M. Ikram says that it "created quite a sensation in the twenties":

The Hindus and Muslims are not two religious sects like the Protestants and Catholics of England, but form two distinct communities of peoples, and so they regard themselves. Their respective attitude towards life, distinctive culture, civilization and social habits, their traditions and history, no less than their religion, divide them so completely that the fact that they have lived in the same country for nearly 1,000 years has contributed hardly anything to their fusion into a nation... Any of us Indian Muslims travelling for instance in Afghanistan, Persia, and Central Asia, among Chinese Muslims, Arabs, and Turks, would at once be made at home and would not find anything to which we are not accustomed. On the contrary in India, we find ourselves in all social matters total aliens when we cross the street and enter that part of the town where our Hindu fellow townsmen live.

More substantially and influentially than Justice Rahim, or the historiography of British administrators, the poet-philosopher Muhammad Iqbal (1877–1938) provided the philosophical exposition and Barrister Muhammad Ali Jinnah (1871–1948) translated it into the political reality of a nation-state.

Some Hindu nationalists also tended to believe Hindus and Muslims are different peoples, as illustrated by a statement made by Vinayak Damodar Savarkar in 1937 during the 19th session of the Hindu Mahasabha in Ahmedabad regarding two nations:-

There are two antagonistic nations living side by side in India. India cannot be assumed today to be a unitarian and homogenous nation. On the contrary, there are two nations in the main: the Hindus and the Muslims, in India.

Flag of the All-India Muslim League

The All-India Muslim League, in attempting to represent Indian Muslims, felt that the Muslims of the subcontinent were a distinct and separate nation from the Hindus. At first they demanded separate electorates, but when they opined that Muslims would not be safe in a Hindu-dominated India, they began to demand a separate state. The League demanded self-determination for Muslim-majority areas in the form of a sovereign state promising minorities equal rights and safeguards in these Muslim majority areas.

Many scholars argue that the creation of Pakistan through the partition of India was orchestrated by an elite class of Muslims in colonial India, not the common man. A large number of Islamic political parties, religious schools, and organizations opposed the partition of India and advocated a composite nationalism of all the people of the country in opposition to British rule (especially the All India Azad Muslim Conference).

In 1941, a CID report states that thousands of Muslim weavers under the banner of Momin Conference and coming from Bihar and Eastern U.P. descended in Delhi demonstrating against the proposed two-nation theory. A gathering of more than fifty thousand people from an unorganized sector was not usual at that time, so its importance should be duly recognized. The non-ashraf Muslims constituting a majority of Indian Muslims were opposed to partition but sadly they were not heard. They were firm believers of Islam yet they were opposed to Pakistan.

On the other hand, Ian Copland, in his book discussing the end of the British rule in the Indian subcontinent, precises that it was not an élite-driven movement alone, who are said to have birthed separatism "as a defence against the threats posed to their social position by the introduction of representative government and competitive recruitment to the public service", but that the Muslim masses participated into it massively because of the religious polarization which had been created by Hindu revivalism towards the last quarter of the 19th century, especially with the openly anti-Islamic Arya Samaj and the whole cow protection movement, and "the fact that some of the loudest spokesmen for the Hindu cause and some of the biggest donors to the Arya Samaj and the cow protection movement came from the Hindu merchant and money lending communities, the principal agents of lower-class Muslim economic dependency, reinforced this sense of insecurity", and because of Muslim resistance, "each year brought new riots" so that "by the end of the century, Hindu-Muslim relations had become so soured by this deadly roundabout of blood-letting, grief and revenge that it would have taken a mighty concerted effort by the leaders of the two communities to repair the breach."

== Relevant opinions ==
The, "Two Nation Theory", has become the official narrative in Pakistan for the creation of the state and key to how Pakistan defines itself, based on religion; seeking a separate homeland for Muslims, Jinnah had said in a speech in Lahore leading up to the partition that Hindus and Muslims belong to two different religious philosophies, social customs and literary traditions, neither intermarrying nor eating together, belonging to two different civilisations whose ideas and conceptions are incompatible. The theory rested on the view that Muslim Indians and Hindu Indians were two separate nations due to being from different religious communities. It asserted that India was not a nation. It also asserted that Hindus and Muslims of the Indian subcontinent were each a nation, despite great variations in language, culture and ethnicity within each of those groups.

=== British officials ===
Theodore Beck, who played a major role in founding of the All-India Muslim League in 1906, was supportive of two-nation theory. Another British official includes Theodore Morison. Both Beck and Morison believed that parliamentary system of majority rule would be disadvantageous for the Muslims.

=== Arya Samaj ===
Bhai Parmanand while reading letters of Lala Lajpat Rai to him in 1909, had jotted an idea that "the territory beyond Sindh could be united with North-West Frontier Province into a great Musulman Kingdom. The Hindus of the region should come away, while at the same time the Musulmans in the rest of the country should go and settle in this territory".

=== Savarkar, Hindu Mahasabha, and the Rashtriya Swayamsevak Sangh ===
An embryonic form of the two-nation theory was seen in the Hindutva ideology since its emergence in 1923. Vinayak Damodar Savarkar in 1937, during the 19th session of the Hindu Mahasabha in Ahmedabad, publicly expressed his support for the two-nation theory. He said:

There are two antagonistic nations living side by side in India. India cannot be assumed today to be a unitarian and homogenous nation. On the contrary, there are two nations in the main: the Hindus and the Muslims, in India.

Savarkar declared on August 15, 1943, in Nagpur:

I have no quarrel with Mr Jinnah's two-nation theory. We Hindus are a nation by ourselves and it is a historical fact that Hindus and Muslims are two nations.

Savarkar saw Muslims in the Indian police and military to be "potential traitors". He advocated that India reduce the number of Muslims in the military, police and public service and ban Muslims from owning or working in munitions factories. Savarkar criticised Gandhi for being concerned about Indian Muslims.

M. S. Golwalkar, the second Sarsanghchalak of the Rashtriya Swayamsevak Sangh (RSS), a right-wing Hindutva paramilitary organisation, believed that the 'partition' actually meant "an acknowledgement that the Muslims formed a distinct and antagonistic national community ... won for itself a distinct state by vivisection of the country in which they had originally come as invaders and where they had been trying to settle down as conquerors".

=== Muhammad Ali Jinnah ===
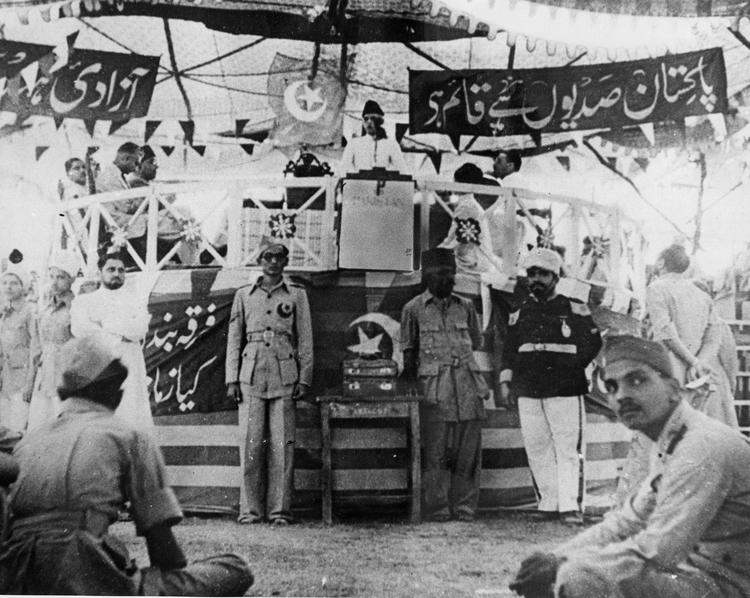
Jinnah addresses the delegates to the Moslem Political Convention held in New Delhi during 1943

In Muhammad Ali Jinnah's All India Muslim League presidential address delivered in Lahore, on March 22, 1940, he explained:

It is extremely difficult to appreciate why our Hindu friends fail to understand the real nature of Islam and Hinduism. They are not religions in the strict sense of the word, but are, in fact, different and distinct social orders, and it is a dream that the Hindus and Muslims can ever evolve a common nationality, and this misconception of one Indian nation has troubles and will lead India to destruction if we fail to revise our notions in time. The Hindus and Muslims belong to two different religious philosophies, social customs, litterateurs. They neither intermarry nor interdine together and, indeed, they belong to two different civilizations which are based mainly on conflicting ideas and conceptions. Their aspect on life and of life are different. It is quite clear that Hindus and Mussalmans derive their inspiration from different sources of history. They have different epics, different heroes, and different episodes. Very often the hero of one is a foe of the other and, likewise, their victories and defeats overlap. To yoke together two such nations under a single state, one as a numerical minority and the other as a majority, must lead to growing discontent and final destruction of any fabric that may be so built for the government of such a state.

—

In 1944, Jinnah said:

We maintain and hold that Muslims and Hindus are two major nations by any definition or test of a nation. We are a nation of hundred million and what is more, we are a nation with our own distinctive culture and civilization, language and literature, art and architecture, names and nomenclature, sense of values and proportions, legal laws and moral codes, customs and calendar, history and tradition, and aptitude and ambitions. In short, we have our own outlook on life and of life.

In an interview with British journalist Beverley Nichols, he said in 1943:

Islam is not only a religious doctrine but also a realistic code of conduct in terms of every day and everything important in life: our history, our laws and our jurisprudence. In all these things, our outlook is not only fundamentally different but also opposed to Hindus. There is nothing in life that links us together. Our names, clothes, food, festivals, and rituals, all are different. Our economic life, our educational ideas, treatment of women, attitude towards animals, and humanitarian considerations, all are very different.

In May 1947, he took an entirely different approach when he told Mountbatten, who was in charge of British India's transition to independence:

Your Excellency doesn't understand that the Punjab is a nation. Bengal is a nation. A man is a Punjabi or a Bengali first before he is a Hindu or a Muslim. If you give us those provinces you must, under no condition, partition them. You will destroy their viability and cause endless bloodshed and trouble.

Mountbatten replied:

Yes, of course. A man is not only a Punjabi or a Bengali before he is a Muslim or Hindu, but he is an Indian before all else. What you're saying is the perfect, absolute answer I've been looking for. You've presented me the arguments to keep India united.

=== Support of Ahmadis ===
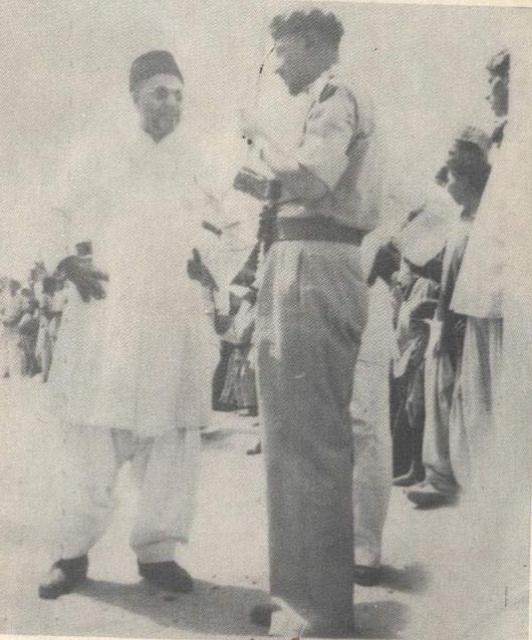
Third Caliph of the Ahmadiyya Muslim Jama'at Mirza Nasir Ahmad conversing with Furqan Force colonel Sahibzada Mubarak Ahmad,

The Ahmadiyya Muslim Jama'at staunchly supported Jinnah and his two-nation theory. Chaudary Zafarullah Khan, an Ahmadi leader, drafted the Lahore Resolution that separatist leaders interpreted as calling for the creation of Pakistan. Chaudary Zafarullah Khan was asked by Jinnah to represent the Muslim League to the Radcliffe Commission, which was charged with drawing the line between an independent India and newly created Pakistan. Ahmadis argued to try to ensure that the city of Qadian, India would fall into the newly created state of Pakistan, though they were unsuccessful in doing so Upon the creation of Pakistan, many Ahmadis held prominent posts in government positions; in the Indo-Pakistani War of 1947–1948, the Ahmadiyya Muslim Jama'at created the Furqan Force to fight Indian troops.

=== Support of Ambedkar ===
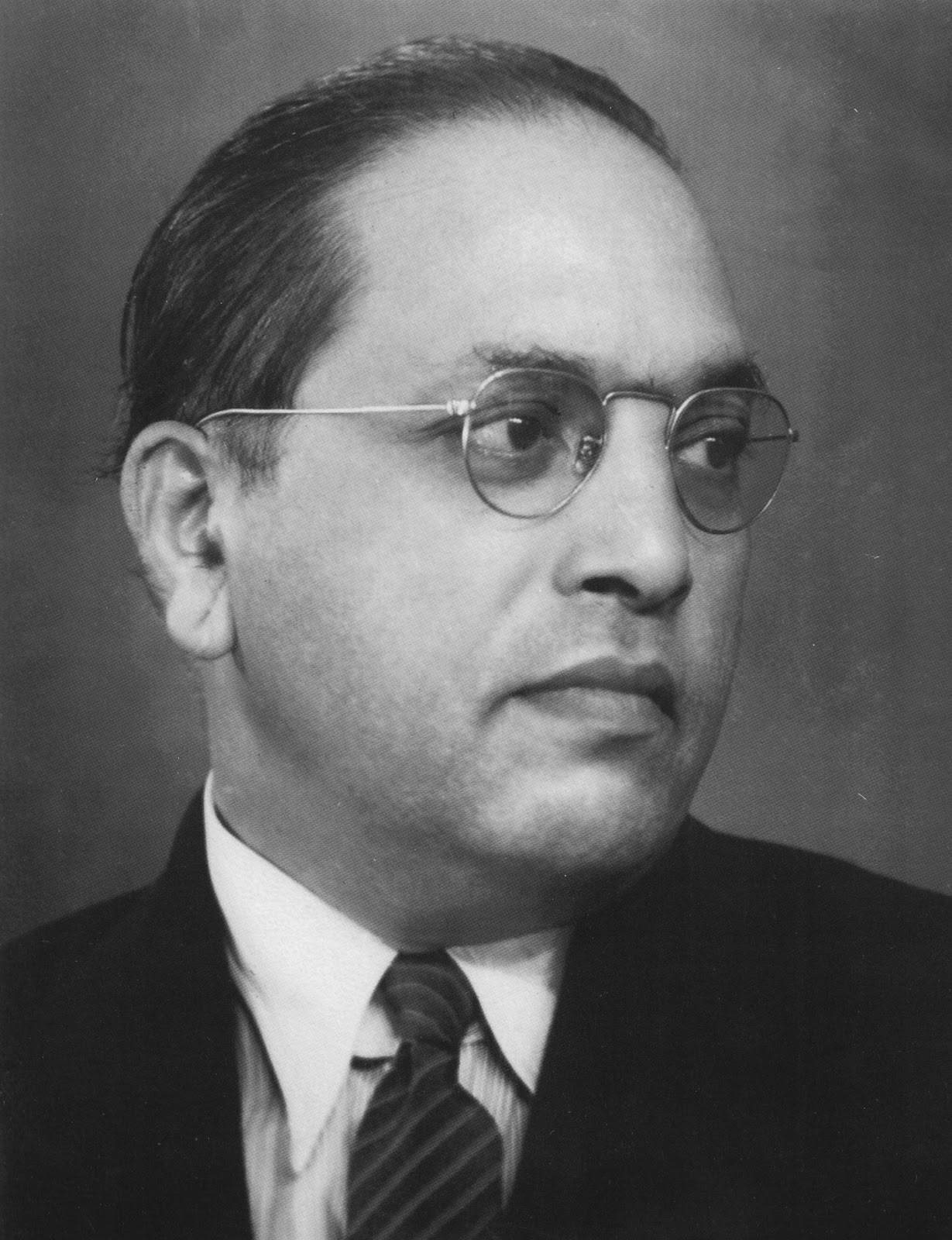
B. R. Ambedkar

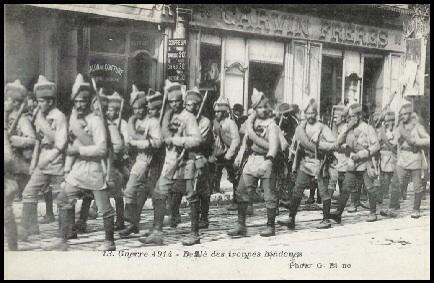
Punjabi Muslim soldiers in the British Indian Army

In his 1945 book Pakistan, Or the Partition of India, the Indian statesman, Buddhist and Dalit activist, Bhimrao Ramji Ambedkar, wrote a sub-chapter titled "If Muslims truly and deeply desire Pakistan, their choice ought to be accepted". Ambedkar's anti-Muslim rhetoric in his book was paradoxical, which in order to agree with Jinnah's two-nation theory, played on every stereotype of Muslim barbarism. It emphasized the threat that the Muslim dominance in the Indian army posed to free India, and about the frightful fate that the Hindus would face if Pakistan was not separated. He asserted that, if the Muslims were bent on the creation of Pakistan, the demand should be conceded in the interest of the safety of India. He asks whether Muslims in the army could be trusted to defend India in the event of Muslims invading India or in the case of a Muslim rebellion, as the bulk of the fighting forces available for the defence of India mostly came from areas which were to be included in Pakistan. "[W]hom would the Indian Muslims in the army side with?" he questioned. According to him, the assumption that Hindus and Muslims could live under one state if they were distinct nations was but "an empty sermon, a mad project, to which no sane man would agree". In direct relation to the two-nation theory, he notably says in the book:

The real explanation of this failure of Hindu-Muslim unity lies in the failure to realize that what stands between the Hindus and Muslims is not a mere matter of difference and that this antagonism is not to be attributed to material causes. It is formed by causes which take their origin in historical, religious, cultural and social antipathy, of which political antipathy is only a reflection. These form one deep river of discontent which, being regularly fed by these sources, keeps on mounting to a head and overflowing its ordinary channels. Any current of water flowing from another source, however pure, when it joins it, instead of altering the colour or diluting its strength becomes lost in the mainstream. The silt of this antagonism which this current has deposited has become permanent and deep. So long as this silt keeps on accumulating and so long as this antagonism lasts, it is unnatural to expect this antipathy between Hindus and Muslims to give place to unity.

According to Ambedkar, Hindu Nationalists naturally felt a resentment towards the assertion that Muslim India was a separate nation, because the Hindus felt ashamed to admit that India was not a nation, and despite attempts by the Hindus to prove to the English that India was in fact a nation, a deadlier blow arrived from the Muslim League which "cuts the whole ground from under the feet of the Hindu politicians." However, Ambedkar asserted that the separation of Muslims from India would benefit India, as the army would no longed be dominated by Muslims. Therefore, the Hindu civilian government would not be vulnerable to the army.

=== Views of the Barelvis ===
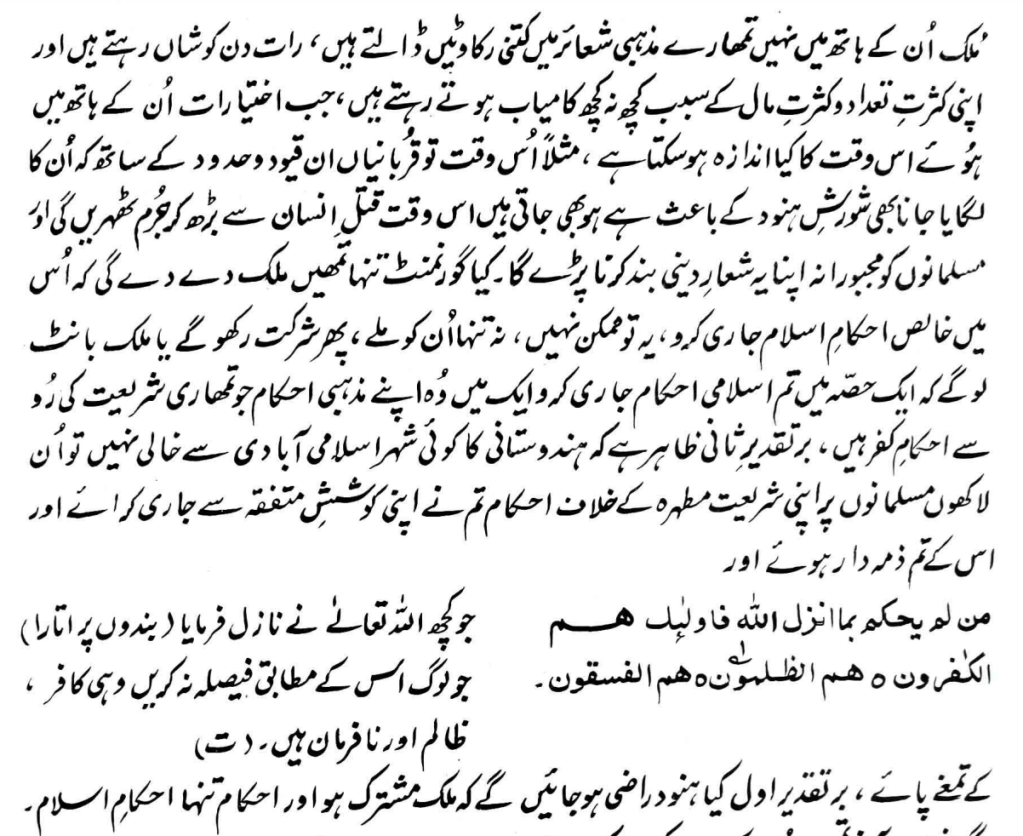
Except from the Fatwa-i-Razaviya, Volume 21

The founder of the Barelvi movement, Ahmad Raza Khan, supported the Muslim League and Pakistan's demand, arguing that befriending 'unbelievers' was forbidden in Islam. Other Barelvi scholars opposed the partition of India and the League's demand to be seen as the only representative of Indian Muslims. Ahmad Raza Khan wrote in the Fatawa-e-Radaviyyah:

"Pay heed, at this time in which the country is not in their hands [Hindus], how many obstacles they place for your religious symbols...When authority shall be in their hands, what can be guessed of that time? For example, at this time ritual slaughtering [qurbānī] occurs with restrictions and limitations...at that time they shall make it a crime worse than murder of a human.

Shall the [British] government grant you [Muslims] alone the country? This is not possible. Nor shall they [Hindus] alone be granted it, then you shall have to share, or you shall have to divide the country. In the event of the second, it is apparent that no Indian city is free from Muslim population, then upon those hundreds of thousands of Muslims you have implemented laws in opposition to your pure Sharīáh with your united effort and you shall be responsible for that...In the event of the first, shall the Hindus agree that the country be shared and that the laws be solely the laws of Islām? Certainly not! Eventually you shall have to agree with them in one law or another that is in opposition to Islām...This is all in the case that dispute does not arise, and if it does break out, and experience informs that it certainly shall, if at that time the Hindus, as per their habit, play innocent and place all the blame upon your heads, then who shall be responsible for raising mischief in the land and opposing the Divine command, “Do not throw yourselves into destruction”, placing the lives and honour of yourselves and of hundreds of thousands of innocent Muslims in danger? May Allāh grant correct understanding! Āmīn."

In 1946, the support of the Barelvi Ulama across India was formalized in support of Pakistan in order to give it religious legitimacy. Pir Jamaat Ali Shah, who claimed an extensive following in rural Northern Punjab and influential Muslims elsewhere, lent unequivocal support for the anti-Hindu stance of the Barelvi Ulama.

=== Pro-Muslim League Newspapers ===
The case for Indo-Muslim identity was based on cultural grounds, understood as an ethnic Muslim identity as well as a clearly identifiable cultural history. In 1947, Dawn made a case for cultural nationalism based on art, literature, and way of life, and crucial to this claim of a nationhood separated from the majority 'Hindu' community was the fixing of a national culture that could be specific to Indian Muslims. In this case, the writer's rather sophisticated definition of 'common culture' - 'developed manifestations of thought and feeling' - serve to reinforce this distinctiveness. Indian Muslims thought differently, felt differently, had a different and unique history and therefore had a common purpose and interest, and therefore belonged to a different nation.

== Opposition to the partition of India ==
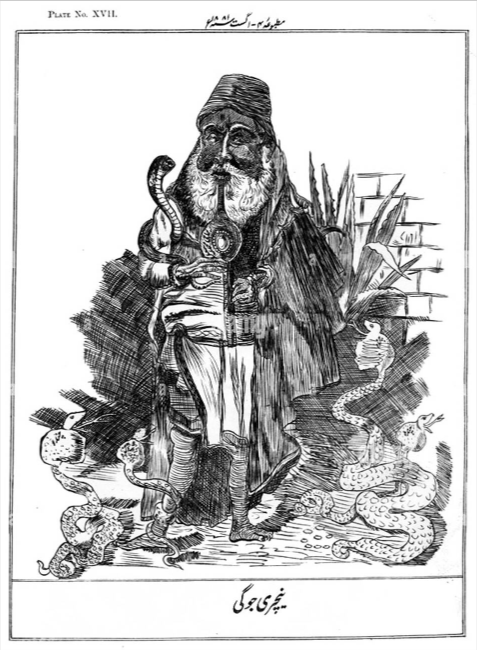
Critical caricature of Syed Ahmed Khan

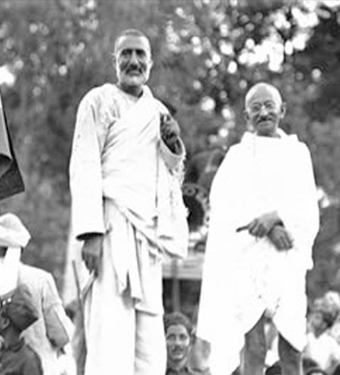
Indian National Congress leaders Abdul Ghaffar Khan and Mohandas Gandhi both championed Hindu–Muslim unity and opposed the partition of colonial India.

The newly formed Dominion of India officially rejected the two-nation theory and chose to be a secular state, enshrining the concepts of religious pluralism and composite nationalism in its constitution.

=== All India Azad Muslim Conference ===
The All India Azad Muslim Conference, which represented nationalist Muslims, gathered in Delhi in April 1940 to voice its support for an independent and united India. The British government, however, sidelined this nationalist Muslim organization and came to see Jinnah, who advocated separatism, as the sole representative of Indian Muslims.

=== Khan Abdul Ghaffar Khan and the Khudai Khidmatgar ===
Khan Abdul Ghaffar Khan, also known as the "Frontier Gandhi" or "Sarhadi Gandhi", was not convinced by the two-nation theory and wanted a single united India as a home for both Hindus and Muslims. He was from the North West Frontier Province of British India, now in present-day Pakistan. He believed that the partition would be harmful to the Muslims of the Indian subcontinent. After partition, following a majority of the NWFP voters going for Pakistan in a controversial referendum, Ghaffar Khan resigned himself to their choice and took an oath of allegiance to the new country on February 23, 1948, during a session of the Constituent Assembly, and his second son, Wali Khan, "played by the rules of the political system" as well.

=== Mahatma Gandhi's view ===
Mahatma Gandhi was against the division of India on the basis of religion. He once wrote:

I find no parallel in history for a body of converts and their descendants claiming to be a nation apart from the parent stock.

=== Maulana Sayyid Abul Kalam Azad's view ===
Maulana Sayyid Abul Kalam Azad was a member of the Indian National Congress and was known as a champion of Hindu-Muslim unity. He argued that Muslims were native to India and had made India their home. Cultural treasures of undivided India such as the Red Fort of Delhi to the Taj Mahal of Agra to the Badshahi Mosque of Lahore reflected an Indo-Islamic cultural legacy in the whole country, which would remain inaccessible to Muslims if they were divided through a partition of India. He opposed the partition of India for as long as he lived.

=== View of the Deobandi ulema ===
The two-nation theory and the partition of India were vehemently opposed by the vast majority of Deobandi Islamic religious scholars, being represented by the Jamiat Ulema-e-Hind that supported both the All India Azad Muslim Conference and Indian National Congress. The principal of Darul Uloom Deoband, Maulana Hussain Ahmad Madni, not only opposed the two-nation theory but sought to redefine the Indian Muslim nationhood. He advocated composite Indian nationalism, believing that nations in modern times were formed on the basis of land, culture, and history. He and other leading Deobandi ulama endorsed territorial nationalism, stating that Islam permitted it.

Despite opposition from the leading Deobandi scholars, Ashraf Ali Thanvi and Mufti Muhammad Shafi instead tried to justify the two-nation theory and concept of Pakistan. The most decisive Deobandi refutation of Madani's "united nationalism", was the commentary I'la al-Sunan, written by Ashraf Ali Thanvi's nephew, which stated that in a mixed nation society, the distinction and identity of Muslim life is diluted. A unified nation where non-Muslims form the numerical majority would result in the "destruction of Islam, its laws, and its rituals, and it is therefore forbidden from the viewpoint of the Shari'ah." Since the distinguishing the Muslims from unbelievers is one of the "fundamentals" of the Shari'ah, anyone who denies the importance of Islamic law in maintaining sharp boundaries between Muslim and non-Muslim - he says in a thiny veiled allusion to Madani - "is neither a competent scholar of Islamic law nor even a proper Muslim." In order to reconcile the two views, Muhammad Zakariya Kandhlawi, who travelled between India and Pakistan several times to resolve the split on the nationalist question, he declared that the split did not constitute a contradiction within Deobandi school based in theology, but merely the political attitude towards the question of sovereign power.

== Post-partition debate ==
Similar debates on national identity existed within India at the linguistic, provincial and religious levels. While some argued that Indian Muslims were one nation, others argued they were not.

Since the partition, the theory has been subjected to animated debates and different interpretations on several grounds. Mr. Niaz Murtaza, a Pakistani scholar with a doctoral degree from the Berkeley-based University of California, wrote in his Dawn column (April 11, 2017):

If the two-nation theory is eternally true, why did Muslims come to Hindu India from Arabia? Why did they live with and rule Hindus for centuries instead of giving them a separate state based on such a theory? Why did the two-nation theory emerge when Hindu rule became certain? All this can only be justified by an absurd sense of superiority claiming a divine birthright to rule others, which many Muslims do hold despite their dismal morals and progress today.

To Indian nationalists, the British government intentionally divided India in order to keep the nation weak. According to Ambedkar, the British colonial government and British commentators made "it a point of speaking of Indians as the people of India and avoid speaking of an Indian nation." This was cited as a key reason for British control of the country: since Indians were not a nation, they were theoretically not capable of national self-government. While some Indian leaders insisted that Indians were one nation, others agreed that Indians were not yet a nation but there was "no reason why in the course of time they should not grow into a nation." Scholars note that a national consciousness has always been present in "India", or more broadly the Indian subcontinent, even if it was not articulated in modern terms. Indian historians such as Shashi Tharoor have claimed that the partition of India was a result of the divide-and-rule policies of the British colonial government initiated after Hindus and Muslims united together to fight against the British East India Company in the Indian Rebellion of 1857. Some, such as Ambedkar argued that Indian Muslims were not yet a nation, but could be forged into one.

According to the Gilani, Pakistani school textbooks make a mistake as Muhammad bin Qasim is often referred to as the first Pakistani. While Prakash K. Singh attributes the arrival of Muhammad bin Qasim as the first step towards the creation of Pakistan. Muhammad Ali Jinnah considered the Pakistan movement to have started when the first Muslim put a foot in the Gateway of Islam.

Many common Muslims criticized the two-nation theory as favoring only the elite class of Muslims, causing the deaths of over one million innocent people.

In his memoirs entitled Pathway to Pakistan (1961), Chaudhry Khaliquzzaman, a prominent leader of the Pakistan movement and the first president of the Pakistan Muslim League, has written: "The two-nation theory, which we had used in the fight for Pakistan, had created not only bad blood against the Muslims of the minority provinces but also an ideological wedge, between them and the Hindus of India.". He further wrote: "He (Huseyn Shaheed Suhrawardy) doubted the utility of the two-nation theory, which to my mind also had never paid any dividends to us, but after the partition, it proved positively injurious to the Muslims of India, and on a long-view basis for Muslims everywhere."

According to Khaliquzzaman, on August 1, 1947, Jinnah invited the Muslim League members of India's constituent assembly to a farewell meeting at his Delhi house.

Mr. Rizwanullah put some awkward questions concerning the position of Muslims, who would be left over in India, their status and their future. I had never before found Mr. Jinnah so disconcerted as on that occasion, probably because he was realizing then quite vividly what was immediately in store for the Muslims. Finding the situation awkward, I asked my friends and colleagues to end the discussion. I believe as a result of our farewell meeting, Mr. Jinnah took the earliest opportunity to bid goodbye to his two-nation theory in his speech on 11 August 1947 as the governor general-designate and President of the constituent assembly of Pakistan.

In his August 11, 1947 speech, Jinnah had spoken of composite Pakistani nationalism, effectively negating the faith-based nationalism that he had advocated in his speech of March 22, 1940. In his August 11 speech, he said that non-Muslims would be equal citizens of Pakistan and that there would be no discrimination against them. "You may belong to any religion or caste or creed that has nothing to do with the business of the state." On the other hand, far from being an ideological point (transition from faith-based to composite nationalism), it was mainly tactical: Dilip Hiro says that "extracts of this speech were widely disseminated" in order to abort the communal violence in Punjab and the NWFP, where Muslims and Sikhs-Hindus were butchering each other and which greatly disturbed Jinnah on a personal level, but "the tactic had little if any, impact on the horrendous barbarity that was being perpetrated on the plains of Punjab." Another Indian scholar, Venkat Dhulipala, who in his book Creating a New Medina precisely shows that Pakistan was meant to be a new Medina, an Islamic state, and not only a state for Muslims, so it was meant to be ideological from the beginning with no space for composite nationalism, in an interview also says that the speech "was made primarily keeping in mind the tremendous violence that was going on", that it was "directed at protecting Muslims from even greater violence in areas where they were vulnerable", "it was pragmatism", and to vindicate this, the historian goes on to say that "after all, a few months later, when asked to open the doors of the Muslim League to all Pakistanis irrespective of their religion or creed, the same Jinnah refused, saying that Pakistan was not ready for it."

The theory has faced skepticism because Muslims did not entirely separate from Hindus and about one-third of all Muslims continued to live in post-partition India as Indian citizens alongside a much larger Hindu majority.

People or religious organizations among others, who moved from India to Pakistan after the partition and instigated the anti-Ahmadi movement, compelled Pakistan into giving up its inclination to secularism in favor of a theocratic state.

=== Impact of Bangladesh's creation ===
The subsequent partition of Pakistan itself into the present-day nations of Pakistan and Bangladesh was cited as proof both that Muslims did not constitute one nation and that religion alone was not a defining factor for nationhood. Some historians have claimed that the theory was a creation of a few Muslim intellectuals. Altaf Hussain, founder of the Muttahida Qaumi Movement believes that history has proved the two-nation theory wrong. He contended, "The idea of Pakistan was dead at its inception when the majority of Muslims (in Muslim-minority areas of India) chose to stay back after partition, a truism reiterated in the creation of Bangladesh in 1971". The Pakistani scholar Tarek Fatah termed the two-nation theory "absurd".

In his Dawn column Irfan Husain, a well-known political commentator, observed that it has now become an "impossible and exceedingly boring task of defending a defunct theory". However some Pakistanis, including a retired Pakistani brigadier, Shaukat Qadir, believe that the theory could only be disproved with the reunification of independent Bangladesh, and Republic of India.

According to Professor Sharif al Mujahid, one of the most preeminent experts on Jinnah and the Pakistan movement, the two-nation theory was relevant only in the pre-1947 subcontinental context. He is of the opinion that the creation of Pakistan rendered it obsolete because the two nations had transformed themselves into Indian and Pakistani nations. Muqtada Mansoor, a columnist for Express newspaper, has quoted Farooq Sattar, a prominent leader of the MQM, as saying that his party did not accept the two-nation theory. "Even if there was such a theory, it has sunk in the Bay of Bengal."

In 1973, there was a movement against the recognition of Bangladesh in Pakistan. Its main argument was that Bangladesh's recognition would negate the two-nation theory. However, Salman Sayyid says that 1971 is not so much the failure of the two-nation theory and the advent of a united Islamic polity despite ethnic and cultural difference, but more so the defeat of "a Westphalian-style nation-state, which insists that linguistic, cultural and ethnic homogeneity is necessary for high 'sociopolitical cohesion'. The break-up of united Pakistan should be seen as another failure of this Westphalian-inspired Kemalist model of nation-building, rather than an illustration of the inability of Muslim political identity to sustain a unified state structure."

Some Bangladesh academics have rejected the notion that 1971 erased the legitimacy of the two-nation theory as well, like Akhand Akhtar Hossain, who thus notes that, after independence, "Bengali ethnicity soon lost influence as a marker of identity for the country's majority population, their Muslim identity regaining prominence and differentiating them from the Hindus of West Bengal", or Taj ul-Islam Hashmi, who says that Islam came back to Bangladeshi politics in August 1975, as the death of Sheikh Mujibur Rahman "brought Islam-oriented state ideology by shunning secularism and socialism." He has quoted Basant Chatterjee, an Indian Bengali journalist, as rebuking the idea of the failure of two-nation theory, arguing that, had it happened, Muslim-majority Bangladesh would have joined Hindu-majority West Bengal in India.

J. N. Dixit, a former ambassador of India to Pakistan, thought the same, stating that Bangladeshis "wanted to emerge not only as an independent Bengali country but as an independent Bengali Muslim country. In this, they proved the British Viceroy Lord George Curzon (1899-1905) correct. His partition of Bengal in 1905 creating two provinces, one with a Muslim majority and the other with a Hindu majority, seems to have been confirmed by Bangladesh's emergence as a Muslim state. So one should not be carried away by the claim of the two-nation theory having been disproved." Dixit has narrated an anecdote. During Prime Minister Zulfikar Ali Bhutto's visit to Dhaka in July 1974, after Sheikh Mujibur Rahman went to Lahore to attend the Islamic summit in February 1974: "As the motorcade moved out, Mujib's car was decorated with garlands of chappals and anti-Awami League slogans were shouted together with slogans such as: "Bhutto Zindabad", and "Bangladesh-Pakistan Friendship Zindabad"." He opines that Bhutto's aim was "to revive the Islamic consciousness in Bangladesh" and "India might have created Bangladesh, but he would see that India would have to deal with not one, but two Pakistans, one in the west and another in the east."

=== Ethnic and provincial groups in Pakistan ===
Several ethnic and provincial leaders in Pakistan also began to use the term "nation" to describe their provinces and argued that their very existence was threatened by the concept of amalgamation into a Pakistani nation on the basis that Muslims were one nation. It has also been alleged that the idea that Islam is the basis of nationhood embroils Pakistan too deeply in the affairs of other predominantly Muslim states and regions, prevents the emergence of a unique sense of Pakistani nationhood that is independent of reference to India, and encourages the growth of a fundamentalist culture in the country.

Also, because partition divided Indian Muslims into three groups (of roughly 190 million people each in India, Pakistan, and Bangladesh) instead of forming a single community inside a united India that would have numbered about 570 million people and potentially exercised great influence over the entire subcontinent. So, the two-nation theory is sometimes alleged to have ultimately weakened the position of Muslims on the subcontinent and resulted in large-scale territorial shrinkage or skewing for cultural aspects that became associated with Muslims (e.g., the decline of Urdu language in India).

This criticism has received a mixed response in Pakistan. A poll conducted by Gallup Pakistan in 2011 shows that an overwhelming majority (92%) of Pakistanis held the view that separation from India was justified in 1947. Pakistani commentators have contended that two nations did not necessarily imply two states, and the fact that Bangladesh did not merge into India after separating from Pakistan supports the two-nation theory.

Counters to this question was the argument that despite the still-extant Muslim minority in India, and asserted variously that Indian Muslims have been "Hinduized" (i.e., lost much of their Muslim identity due to assimilation into Hindu culture), or that they are treated as an excluded or alien group by an allegedly Hindu-dominated India. Factors such as lower literacy and education levels among Indian Muslims as compared to Indian Hindus, longstanding cultural differences, and outbreaks of religious violence such as those occurring during the 2002 Gujarat riots in India are cited.

=== Pan-Islamic identity ===
The emergence of a sense of identity that is pan-Islamic rather than Pakistani has been defended as consistent with the founding ideology of Pakistan and the concept that "Islam itself is a nationality," despite the commonly held notion of "nationality, to Muslims, is like idol worship." While some have emphasized that promoting the primacy of a pan-Islamic identity (over all other identities) is essential to maintaining a distinctiveness from India and preventing national "collapse", others have argued that the two-nation theory has served its purpose in "midwifing" Pakistan into existence and should now be discarded to allow Pakistan to emerge as a normal nation-state.

=== Post-partition perspectives in India ===
The Republic of India officially rejected the two-nation theory and chose to be a secular state, enshrining the concepts of religious pluralism and composite nationalism in its constitution. Constitutionally, India rejects the two-nation theory and regards Indian Muslims as equal citizens.

Nevertheless, in post-independence India, the two-nation theory helped advance the cause of Hindu nationalist groups seeking to identify a "Hindu national culture" as the core identity of an Indian. This allows the acknowledgment of the common ethnicity of Indian Hindus and Muslims while requiring that all adopt a Hindu identity to be truly Indian. From the Hindu nationalist perspective, this concedes the ethnic reality that Indian Muslims are "flesh of our flesh and blood of our blood" but still presses for an officially recognized equation of national and religious identity, i.e., that "an Indian is a Hindu."

The theory and the very existence of Pakistan has caused Indian far-right extremist groups to allege that Indian Muslims "cannot be loyal citizens of India" or any other non-Muslim nation, and are "always capable and ready to perform traitorous acts".

=== Opinions in Pakistan and Bangladesh ===
With the rise of the Bharatiya Janata Party and the attendant marginalisation of Muslims in India, some in Pakistan and Bangladesh have argued that Jinnah's views had been vindicated. People including General Qamar Javed Bajwa believed that the separation of the Muslim-majority areas into Pakistan has saved many Muslims from domination by the Hindu nationalists. General Asim Munir also agrees with this doctrine. He said that "our religions are different, our cultures are different, our traditions are different, our thoughts are different, our ambitions are different".

== See also ==
- Pakistanism
- Composite nationalism
- Secularism in Pakistan
- Ziaism
- Madani–Iqbal debate

== Bibliography ==
- Mukherjee, Bratindra Nath (2001), Nationhood and Statehood in India: A historical survey, Regency Publications, ISBN 978-81-87498-26-1
- Khaliquzzaman, Choudhry (1993), Pathway to Pakistan, Lahore: Brothers' Publisher
