= Mast Magan =

2014 Hindi song

- Cover featuring actors Arjun Kapoor and Alia Bhatt

Song by Arijit Singh and Chinmayi

from the album 2 States
- Language: Hindi
- Released: 15 March 2014
- Genre: Filmi, Sufi/Qawwali
- Length: 4:40
- Label: T-Series
- Songwriter: Amitabh Bhattacharya

Music video
- "Mast Magan" on YouTube

Mast Magan (transl. Captivated heart) is a romantic Hindi song from the 2014 Hindi film, 2 States. Composed by Shankar–Ehsaan–Loy, the song is sung by Arijit Singh and Chinmayi, with lyrics penned by Amitabh Bhattacharya. The music video of the track features actors Arjun Kapoor and Alia Bhatt.

== Background ==
The song is composed by Shankar–Ehsaan–Loy. Director of the film, Abhishek Varman wanted Shankar–Ehsaan–Loy to compose the music for the album, in order to create a romantic album that has soul and 'young energy' in it. Producer of the film, Sajid Nadiadwala selected the song as his most favorite track from the album. In an interview with Bollywood Hungama, the leading lady of the film Alia Bhatt stated that the song is one of her personal favorites from the film.

The song is sung by Arijit Singh and Chinmayi. Nadiawala and Karan Johar felt that Singh's voice has a 'haunting quality' and makes the song stay with the listener. The song's lyrics were penned by Amitabh Bhattacharya. Johar stated that Bhattacharya is a strong talent in music and his words tend to have a 'colloquial nature', but they also have a 'tremendous amount of soul'.

== Music video ==
The song is picturised on Arjun Kapoor and Alia Bhatt. The video of the song shows how the bond between their respective characters, Punjabi Krish Malhotra and Tamilian Ananya Swaminathan strengthens. It has been filmed at locations in Tamil Nadu including Adikesava Perumal temple at Mylapore and a pier at Ennore beach. The video of the song was filmed much before the recording of the actual song.

== Release ==
The song was released on 15 March 2014, along with other tracks in the album. The music video of the song was officially released on 26 March 2014, through the YouTube channel of T-Series. The music video of the song, was the third song released from the album, after two the two singles, "Offo" and "Locha-E-Ulfat" The music video has over 91 Millions views as of March 2025.

The song was ranked at the third position in the "Bollywood music report January–September 2014" published by The Times of India.

== Critical reception ==
The song received positive reviews from critics.

Bollywood Hungama's Rajiv Vijayakar credited, 'imagery-laden' lyrics by Amitabh Bhattacharya, the 'haunting rhythmic guitar riff' and the 'placidity of the composition' along with Arijit Singh's vocals, for making the song, the finest number from the soundtrack.

Joginder Tuteja from Rediff.com praised the rendition of the song by the vocalists, and stated the song has a slight "Sufi touch though it is inherently a Bollywood number". Devesh Sharma reviewing from Filmfare mentioned the 'soulful rendition' by the singers and felt, they did 'magic' in the song as well. Bodrul Chaudhury reviewing from Bolly Spice, praised the lyrics of the song and stated that immense singing by Singh gave 'the standout performance' in the song.

Sankhayan Ghosh from The Indian Express found the chorus of the song 'wonderful' though criticized for having an 'uncanny resemblance with Ishq Sufiyana' from The Dirty Picture (2011). Aishwarya from Koimoi stated the song "does not bore you or even sound repetitive" and felt, Singh's vocals resembles of Shafqat Amanat Ali in the song.

== Accolades ==
Award 2015	Category	Nominee	Result	Ref
60th Britannia Filmfare Awards	Best Male Playback Singer	Arijit Singh	Nominated	
Global Indian Music Academy Awards	Best Film Song	Shankar–Ehsaan–Loy	Nominated	
Global Indian Music Academy Awards	Best Lyricist	Amitabh Bhattacharya	Nominated	
7th Mirchi Music Awards	Music Composer of the Year	Shankar–Ehsaan–Loy	Won	
7th Mirchi Music Awards	Song Representing Sufi Tradition	Shankar–Ehsaan–Loy	Nominated	
