= Furqan Force =

Paramilitary force in the Dominion of Pakistan

- The Liwa-e-Ahmadiyya, the flag of the Ahmadiyya Muslim Community and accordingly the battle flag of the Furqan Force
- Formation: 1948
- Founder: Mirza Basheer-ud-Din Mahmood Ahmad
- Defunct: 1950; 76 years ago
- Legal status: Defunct
- Region served: Dominion of Pakistan

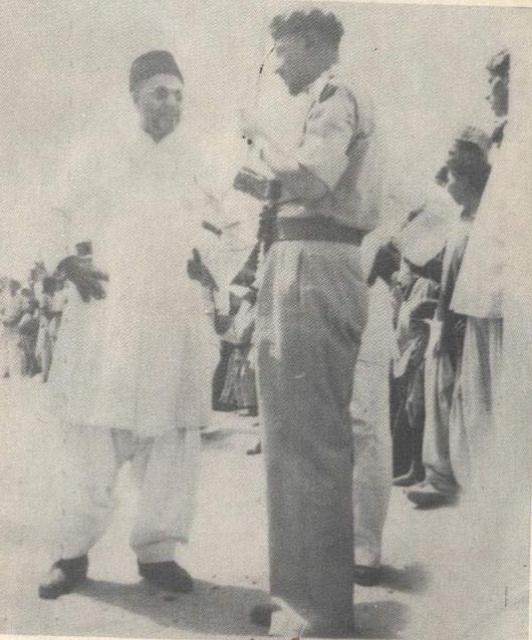
Mirza Nasir Ahmad (left) chatting with Furqan Force colonel Sahibzada Mubarak Ahmad

The Furqan Force or Furqan Battalion was a uniformed battalion force of volunteers of the minority Ahmadiyya Muslim Community in the Dominion of Pakistan. Formed in June 1948 at the direction of Head of the Worldwide Ahmadiyya Muslim Community, Mirza Basheer-ud-Din Mahmood Ahmad, the unit fought for Pakistan against India in the First Kashmir War. In addition to its troops being drawn from the Ahmadiyya population, the expenses of maintaining the unit were also paid by that community. It was said that the battalion performed its task very well.

The unit was disbanded on 7 June 1950. Following the anti-Ahmadiyya Lahore riots of 1953, a Pakistani court of inquiry cited the Furqan Battalion in discussions of the Ahmadiyya role in Pakistani society.
