= Gallup Pakistan =

Pakistani research organisation

- Established: 1980; 46 years ago
- Type: Research and survey organization
- Legal status: Commercial Organization
- Key people: Ijaz Shafi Gilani (Chairman)
- Affiliations: Gallup International Association
- Website: gallup.com.pk

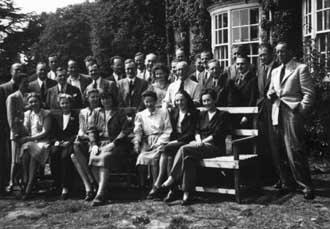
Founding Meeting of Gallup

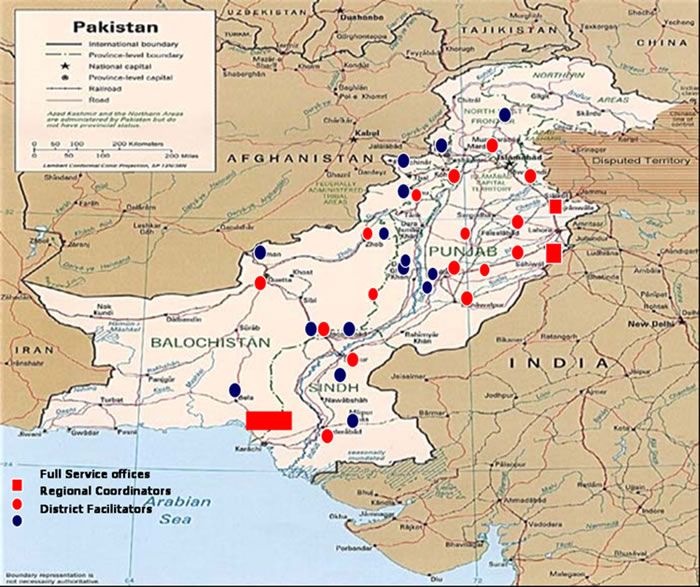
Map of Pakistan with Gallup Pakistan's office locations pointed out

Gallup Pakistan, affiliated to Gallup International Association, is a research organization located in Pakistan.

It is not related to The Gallup Organization. Each year Gallup Pakistan conducts several high-profile studies for the Government of Pakistan and international agencies. It has worked for a number of UN agencies in Pakistan, and has occasionally provided research support for projects conducted by academic institutions, World Bank, WHO, UNICEF, ILO, UNIDO etc.

== Field network ==
They have three service offices at Karachi, Lahore and Islamabad and a large network of Field Staff, operating from 17 field Offices located in all the four provinces of the country. It has local teams in 34 districts.

Currently, their field offices are located in many locations, from where they cover rural and urban areas in the surrounding districts.

== Gallup Pakistan's poll for 2018 elections ==
According to November 2017 polls and survey by Gallup Pakistan, nationwide results show that a majority of the people in Punjab prefer Pakistan Muslim League (N), Khyber Pakhtunkhwa stands with Pakistan Tehreek-e-Insaf, while the province of Sindh prefers Pakistan Peoples Party. A large majority of Pakistani people wanted elections on time.

In 2013, Gallup Pakistan's poll about 2013 Pakistani general election turned out to be largely correct because it predicted, in April 2013, a comfortable lead for Nawaz Sharif's party, Pakistan Muslim League (N) ahead of the 11 May 2013 elections.

== Gallup Pakistan's poll for 2024 elections ==
In January 2024, Gallup Pakistan released on its website a report titled Political Weather Report One Month Before the General Election 2024.

The report made the following key assertions which were proven correct on February 8, 2024.

Punjab: The PTI and PML-N were in a tough competition in Punjab, 34 per cent and 32 per cent of the sample survey respondents saying they would vote for the two parties respectively. The General Election 2024 results show that the predicted outcome was razor-thin close to the actual outcome. PTI-backed independents got more votes than the score was 35 per cent for the PTI and 34 per cent for the PML-N.

The survey indicated that, despite significant efforts, the PPP was unable to increase its vote bank, with the study estimating a 6.0 per cent vote share for the party, which was later confirmed. Lastly, the report said: “Survey results show that Punjab vote bank reflects return to 2018 General Election political landscape”. This has proven to be correct as well as the share of votes that the top three parties has received is almost the same as what they got in Punjab in the 2018 general election. In 2018, the PTI was 1.0 per cent ahead of the PML-N in Punjab.

Khyber Pakhtunkhwa: The report suggested that KP has an overwhelming support for the PTI (45 per cent of the survey respondents said they would vote for it), and trailing much behind would be JUI-F at 15 per cent, PML-N (9.0 per cent), PPP (7.0 per cent) and ANP (7.0 per cent). The election results match almost completely within this prediction. The PTI has received 44 per cent votes, JUI-F 15 per cent votes, PPP received 6.0 per cent votes and ANP got 7.0 per cent. The prediction and the election result is within a 1-2 per cent margin.

Sindh: The report suggested the PPP would be the single largest party in Sindh with 44 per cent votes. The current election data shows 44 per cent of the voters in Sindh have voted for the PPP.

In other words, the electoral outcome predicted by Gallup Pakistan matched the actual outcome.

== Gallup Pakistan media report ==
Gallup Pakistan Media Reports & Media Surveys have been providing figures for over 30 years. It also provides the country's television ratings, subscribed by all of the top ten advertising agencies, and it also carries out extensive research on newspaper and radio audiences. Gallup launched people meters in Pakistan. According to Gallup Pakistan, Geo News is the most watched channel of Pakistan in 2018.

== Cyberletters ==
Gallup Pakistan releases monthly and quarterly cyberletter across various niches, like financial inclusion, health, newspaper and talk show analysis.

=== FinDev cyberletter ===
The principal purpose of the monthly FinDev Cyberletter is to inform its readers of the latest developments in the financial industry across the globe, particularly in the realms of Financial Inclusion and Digital Financial Services (DFS), where efforts are being undertaken by both private and government sectors. Each issue of the FinDev Cyberletter will focuses on a particular theme within the broader area of financial inclusion and related topics.

=== Newspaper content analysis ===
The newspaper content analysis is a monthly series that analyses opinion pieces from 12 English and Urdu newspapers published in Pakistan into 18 distinct themes, namely politics, social, climate and environment, governance, crime and terrorism, economy, education, energy crisis, health, human rights, international, law and order, media, religious, science and technology, security, sports, and miscellaneous. Over 2000 articles are analyzed per month to create the comprehensive report.

=== Health cyberletter ===
The monthly health cyberletter contains comprehensive analysis of different health-related themes every month. It explored topics like Stress, Nutrition, Environment, Public and Private Facilities, in conjunction with health in Pakistan. It is a part of Gallup Pakistan's Public Health Program.

== Press releases ==
Gallup Pakistan releases one press release every working day on a public interest issue based on Nationally Representative Surveys.

== Gallup International ==
Gallup Pakistan is the sole representative of Gallup International in Pakistan.
