= Bibliography of Pakistan =

This is a list of notable books and works in the English language written about Pakistan.

== History ==
- B. R. Ambedkar (1946). Pakistan or the Partition of India. Bombay: Thackers Publishers.
- K K Aziz, The Murder of History in Pakistan: A critique of history textbooks used in Pakistan, Vanguard Books Pvt Ltd, Lahore, 1993.
- Seshadri, H. V. (2013). The tragic story of partition. Bangalore : Sahitya Sindhu Prakashana, 2013.
- Rosser, Yvette. Islamization of Pakistani Social Studies Textbooks, RUPA, New Delhi, 2003.
- Masood Ashraf Raja. Constructing Pakistan: Foundational Texts and the Rise of Muslim National Identity, 1857–1947, Oxford 2010, ISBN 978-0-19-547811-2
- Nayyar, A. H. & Salim, Ahmad. (2003) The Subtle Subversion: The State of Curricula and Text-books in Pakistan - Urdu, English, Social Studies and Civics. Sustainable Development Policy Institute. The Subtle Subversion
- Mubarak Ali. In the Shadow of history, Nigarshat, Lahore; History on Trial, Fiction House, Lahore, 1999; Tareekh Aur Nisabi Kutub, Fiction House, Lahore, 2003.
- Purifying the Land of the Pure: Pakistan's Religious Minorities by Farahnaz Ispahani, Publisher: HarperCollins India
- Dastidar, S. G. (2008). Empire's last casualty: Indian subcontinent's vanishing Hindu and other minorities. Kolkata: Firma KLM.
- Kamra, A. J. (2000). The prolonged partition and its pogroms: Testimonies on violence against Hindus in East Bengal 1946-64.
- Spear, Percival (2007), India, Pakistan and the West. Read books publishers, ISBN 1-4067-1215-9
- Wolpert, Stanley. Jinnah of Pakistan. Oxford University Press, USA. May 1984. ISBN 0-19-503412-0
- Yasmeen Niaz Mohiuddin, Pakistan: a global studies handbook. ABC-CLIO publishers, 2006, ISBN 1-85109-801-1

== Politics, foreign relations and military ==
- Ayres, Robert (1998), Turning Point: The End of the Growth Paradigm. James & James publishers, ISBN 1-85383-439-4
- Fair, C. Christine, The Militant Challenge in Pakistan (Asia Policy, January 2011)
- Ian, Talbot (1999). The Armed Forces of Pakistan. Macmillan publishers, ISBN 0-312-21606-8
- Rubinstein, W. D. (2004). Genocide: a history. Pearson Longman Publishers, ISBN 0-582-50601-8
- Pervez Hoodbhoy and A. H. Nayyar. "Rewriting the history of Pakistan", in Islam, Politics and the state: The Pakistan Experience, Ed. Mohammad Asghar Khan, Zed Books, London, 1985
- Ḥaqqānī, H. (2016). Pakistan: Between mosque and military. Gurgaon, Haryana : Viking, 2016
- Haqqani, H. (2015). Magnificent delusions: Pakistan, the United States, and an epic history of misunderstanding. New York : PublicAffairs
- Ḥaqqānī, H. (2016). India vs Pakistan: Why can't we just be friends?. New Delhi, India : Juggernaut, 2016.
- Lieven, A. (2012). Pakistan: A hard country. London: Penguin
- Tariq Rahman, Denizens of Alien Worlds: A Study of Education, Inequality and Polarization in Pakistan Karachi, Oxford University Press, 2004. Reprint. 2006
- Tariq Rahman, Language, Ideology and Power: Language learning among the Muslims of Pakistan and North India Karachi, Oxford UP, 2002
- Tariq Rahman, Language and Politics in Pakistan Karachi: Oxford UP, 1996. Rept. several times. see 2006 edition.

== Religion, culture and arts ==
- Zaman, Muhammad Qasim, Islam in Pakistan: A History (Princeton UP, 2018) online review
- Wink, Andre, Al-Hind: The Making of the Indo-Islamic World, Brill Academic Publishers, 1 January 1996, ISBN 90-04-09249-8
- Masood Ashraf Raja. Constructing Pakistan: Foundational Texts and the Rise of Muslim National Identity, 1857–1947, Oxford 2010, ISBN 978-0-19-547811-2
- Seyyed Vali Reza Nasr, The Vanguard of the Islamic Revolution: The Jama`at-i Islami of Pakistan (University of California Press, 1994)

== Society and people ==
- For Hire (2010), Experiences by a taxi driver, Ferozsons Publishers
- Fabry Ph., (1995) Wandering with the Indus, Yusuf Shahid (text) Lahore, Ferozsons, 152 p., ISBN 969-0-10224-9
- Naipaul, V. S. (2011). Among the Believers: An Islamic Journey
- Seth, P. N. (2009). Lahore to Delhi: Rising from the ashes : autobiography of a refugee from Pakistan Bangalore: Punya Pub. (ISBN 9788189534110)

== See also ==
- Muhammad Iqbal bibliography
- List of books about K2
- Pakistan Economy
