= Operation Enduring Freedom =

Official name for the US's war on terror

- Part of the war on terror and War in Afghanistan
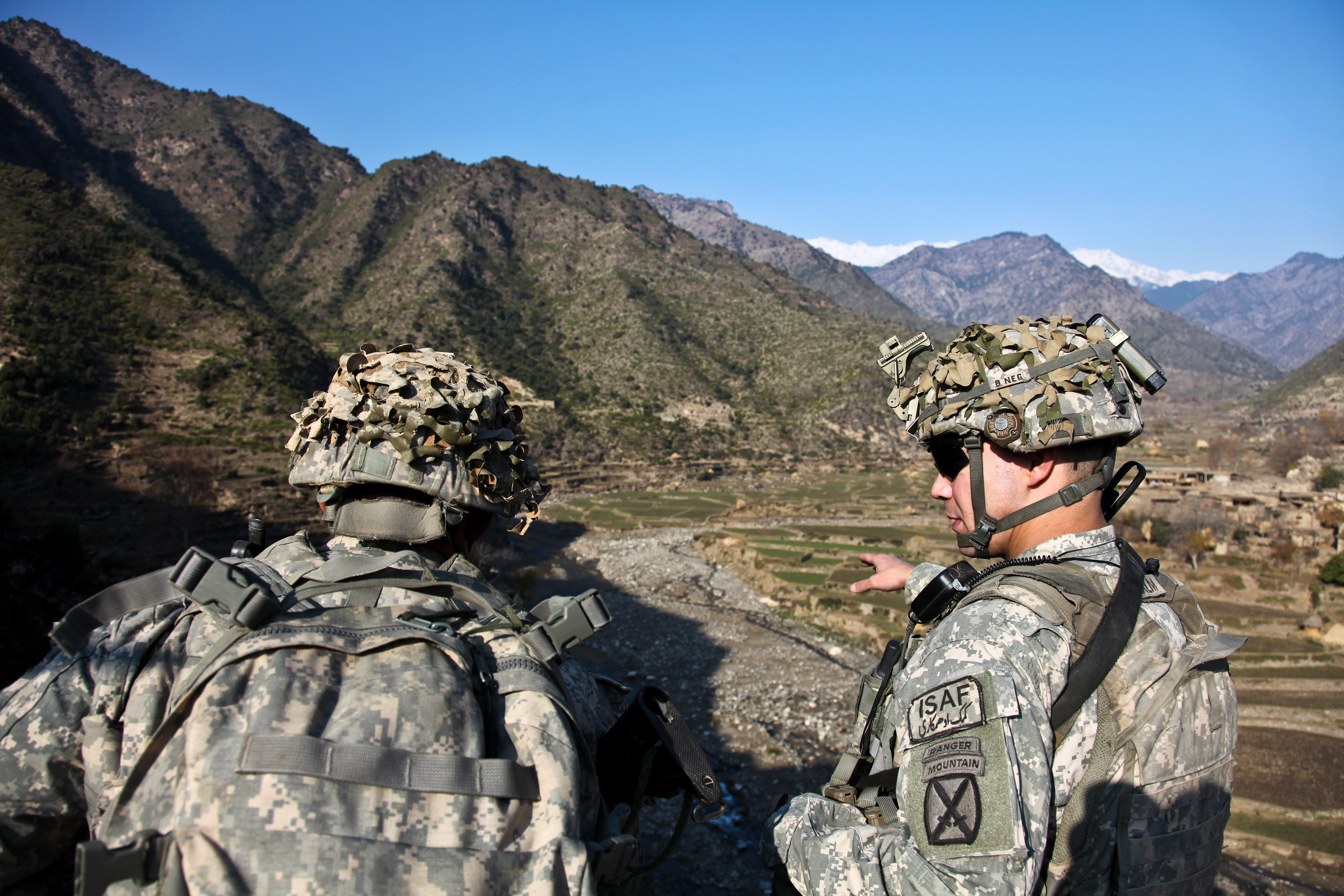
- U.S. soldiers of the Army's 10th Mountain Division deployed during Operation Enduring Freedom, 2009
| Date | 7 October 2001 – 28 December 2014 (in Afghanistan) (13 years, 2 months and 3 weeks) |
| Location | Afghanistan, Philippines, Somalia, Georgia, Kyrgyzstan, Sahara Desert |
| Result | Beginning of Operation Freedom's Sentinel |

Belligerents
| In Afghanistan: (completed): NATO; ISAF; Albania; Finland; Denmark; United States; United Kingdom; France; Australia; Canada; Germany; Belgium; Norway; Italy; Georgia; Spain; Portugal; Poland; Armenia; Azerbaijan; Sweden; Czech Republic; New Zealand; Netherlands; Romania; Ukraine; Turkey; Thailand; Uzbekistan; United Arab Emirates; Former: (Afghanistan) Northern Alliance; In the Philippines: (completed): Philippines; United States; Australia; Indonesia; In Somalia/Horn of Africa: Ongoing: NATO; European Union; SADC; Australia; Azerbaijan; Belarus; Canada; Djibouti; Ethiopia; France; Georgia; Germany; Greece; India; Indonesia; Italy; Japan; Kazakhstan; Kenya; South Korea; Kyrgyzstan; Malaysia; New Zealand; Norway; Pakistan; Russia; Seychelles; Singapore; South Africa; Somalia; Spain; Tajikistan; Thailand; Turkey; Turkmenistan; Uganda; Ukraine; Uzbekistan; United Kingdom; United States; In Georgia: (completed): Georgia; United States; In Kyrgyzstan: (completed): South Korea; Kyrgyzstan; Russia; United States; Other nations | In Afghanistan: Taliban; al-Qaeda; In the Philippines: Abu Sayyaf (from 2001); Jemaah Islamiyah (until 2024); Moro Islamic Liberation Front (until 2012) (Note: Misuari faction.); In Somalia: Al-Shabaab (from 2006); Hizbul Islam (until 2014); In Sahara: Al-Qaeda Organization in the Islamic Maghreb; Jama'at Nasr al-Islam wal-Muslimin |

Commanders and leaders
| (United States) CIC George W Bush (2001–2009) (United States) CIC Barack Obama (2009–2014) (United States) GEN Tommy Franks (2001–2003) (United States) GEN John Abizaid (2003–2007) (United States) ADM William J. Fallon (2007–2008) (United States) GEN Martin Dempsey (2008–2015) (United Kingdom) MRAF Sir Graham Stirrup (2003–2011) (United States) GEN David Petraeus (2008–2010) | (Afghanistan) Mohammad Omar # Osama bin Laden †; Ayman al-Zawahiri †; Khadaffy Janjalani †; Riduan Isamuddin (POW) |

Casualties and losses
| 66,000+ killed 12,000+ killed (United States) 2,380 killed by January 2016 (United Kingdom) 456 killed (France) 301 killed (Canada) 158 killed (Germany) 54 killed (Italy) 53 killed (Denmark) 43 killed (Australia) 41 killed (Poland) 40 killed (Spain) 34 killed (Georgia (country)) 32 killed Others 200+ killed | In Afghanistan: 72,000+ killed; In the Philippines: 328+; In Somalia: 260 to 365 killed |

Operation Enduring Freedom (OEF) was the official name used by the U.S. government for both the first stage (2001–2014) of the war in Afghanistan (2001–2021) and related military operations during the broader-scale global war on terrorism. On 7 October 2001, in response to the September 11 attacks, President George W. Bush announced that airstrikes against al-Qaeda and the Taliban had begun in Afghanistan. Beyond the military activities in Afghanistan, a number of U.S military command structures operating under the Operation Enduring Freedom banner were also affiliated with several counterterrorism missions in other countries, such as OEF-Philippines and OEF-Trans Sahara.

After 13 years, on 28 December 2014, President Barack Obama announced the end of Operation Enduring Freedom in Afghanistan. Subsequent operations in Afghanistan by the United States' military forces, both non-combat and combat, occurred under the name Operation Freedom's Sentinel.

== Subordinate operations ==
Operation Enduring Freedom referred to the American-led combat mission in Afghanistan. The codename was also used for counter-terrorism operations in other countries targeting Al Qaeda and remnants of the Taliban, such as OEF-Philippines, OEF-Trans Sahara, and possibly in Georgia's Pankisi Gorge, primarily through government funding vehicles.

- Operation Enduring Freedom (OEF), 7 October 2001–31 December 2014. Succeeded by Operation Freedom's Sentinel.
- Operation Enduring Freedom – Philippines (OEF-P, formerly Operation Freedom Eagle), 15 January 2002 – 24 February 2015
- Operation Enduring Freedom – Horn of Africa (OEF-HOA)
- Operation Juniper Shield, formerly known as Operation Enduring Freedom – Trans Sahara (OEF-TS; see also Insurgency in the Maghreb)
- Operation Enduring Freedom – Caribbean and Central America (OEF-CCA)
- Operation Enduring Freedom – Kyrgyzstan, 18 December 2001 – 3 June 2014

== Etymology ==
The U.S. government used the term "Operation Enduring Freedom" to officially describe the War in Afghanistan, from the period between 7 October 2001 and 31 December 2014. Subsequent operations in Afghanistan by the United States' military forces, both non-combat and combat, occurred under the name Operation Freedom's Sentinel.

The operation was originally called "Operation Infinite Justice", but as similar phrases have been used by adherents of several religions as an exclusive description of God, it is believed to have been changed to avoid offense to Muslims who are the majority religion in Afghanistan. In September 2001, U.S. President George W. Bush's remark that "this crusade, this war on terrorism, is going to take a while," which prompted widespread criticism from the Islamic world, may also have contributed to the renaming of the operation.

The term "OEF" typically refers to the phase of the War in Afghanistan from 2001 to 2014. Other operations, such as the Georgia Train and Equip Program, are only loosely or nominally connected, such as through government funding vehicles. All the operations, however, have a focus on counterterrorism activities.

Operation Enduring Freedom, which was a joint U.S., U.K., and Afghan operation, was separate from the International Security Assistance Force (ISAF), which was an operation of North Atlantic Treaty Organization nations including the U.S. and the U.K. The two operations ran in parallel, although it had been suggested that they merge.

== Overview ==
On September 11th, 2001, Al Qaeda carried out terrorist attacks in New York City and Washington D.C. Shortly after, President George W. Bush declared a war on terror. In response to the September 11 attacks, the early combat operations that took place on 7 October 2001 to include a mix of strikes from land-based B-1 Lancer, B-2 Spirit and B-52 Stratofortress bombers, carrier-based F-14 Tomcat and F/A-18 Hornet fighters, and Tomahawk cruise missiles launched from both U.S. and British ships and submarines signaled the start of Operation Enduring Freedom.

The initial military objectives of OEF, as articulated by President George W. Bush in his 20 September address to a Joint Session of Congress and his 7 October address to the country, included the destruction of terrorist training camps and infrastructure within Afghanistan, the capture of al-Qaeda leaders, and the cessation of terrorist activities in Afghanistan.

In January 2002, over 1,200 soldiers from the United States Special Operations Command Pacific (SOCPAC) deployed to the Philippines to support the Armed Forces of the Philippines (AFP) in their push to uproot terrorist forces on the island of Basilan. Of those groups included are Abu Sayyaf Group (ASG), al-Qaeda and Jemaah Islamiyah. The operation consisted of training the AFP in counter-terrorist operations as well as supporting the local people with humanitarian aid in Operation Smiles.

In October 2002, the Combined Task Force 150 and United States military Special Forces established themselves in Djibouti at Camp Lemonnier. The stated goals of the operation were to provide humanitarian aid and patrol the Horn of Africa to reduce the abilities of terrorist organizations in the region. Similar to OEF-P, the goal of humanitarian aid was emphasized, ostensibly to prevent militant organizations from being able to take hold amongst the population as well as reemerge after being removed.

The military aspect involves coalition forces searching and boarding ships entering the region for illegal cargo as well as providing training and equipment to the armed forces in the region. The humanitarian aspect involves building schools, clinics and water wells to enforce the confidence of the local people.

Since 2001, the cumulative expenditure by the U.S. government on Operation Enduring Freedom has exceeded $150 billion.

== Operation Enduring Freedom (OEF) in Afghanistan ==
=== Taliban ===
Seizing upon a power vacuum after the Soviets withdrew from Afghanistan after their invasion, the Taliban governed Afghanistan from 1996 to 2001. Their extreme interpretation of Islamic law prompted them to ban music, television, sports, and dancing, and enforce harsh judicial penalties (See Human rights in Afghanistan). Amputation was an accepted form of punishment for stealing, and public executions could often be seen at the Kabul football stadium. Women's rights groups around the world were frequently critical as the Taliban banned women from appearing in public or holding many jobs outside the home. They drew further criticism when they destroyed the Buddhas of Bamyan, historical statues nearly 1,500 years old, because the Buddhas were considered idols.

In 1996, Saudi dissident Osama bin Laden moved to Afghanistan. When the Taliban came to power, bin Laden was able to forge an alliance between the Taliban and his al-Qaeda organization. It is understood that al-Qaeda-trained fighters known as the 055 Brigade were integrated with the Taliban army between 1997 and 2001. It has been suggested that the Taliban and bin Laden had very close connections.

=== U.S.-led coalition action ===
On 20 September 2001, the U.S. stated that Osama bin Laden was behind the 11 September attacks in 2001. The U.S. made a five-point ultimatum to the Taliban:

- Deliver to the U.S. all of the leaders of al-Qaeda
- Release all imprisoned foreign nationals
- Close immediately every terrorist training camp
- Hand over every terrorist and their supporters to appropriate authorities
- Give the United States full access to terrorist training camps for inspection

On 21 September 2001, the Taliban rejected this ultimatum, stating there was no evidence in their possession linking bin Laden to the 11 September attacks.

On 22 September 2001, the United Arab Emirates and later Saudi Arabia withdrew their recognition of the Taliban as the legal government of Afghanistan, leaving neighboring Pakistan as the only remaining country with diplomatic ties.

On 4 October 2001, it was reported that the Taliban covertly offered to turn bin Laden over to Pakistan for trial in an international tribunal that operated according to Islamic shar'ia law. On 7 October 2001, the Taliban proposed to try bin Laden in Afghanistan in an Islamic court. This proposition was immediately rejected by the US.

On 14 October 2001, the Taliban proposed to hand bin Laden over to a third country for trial, but only if they were given evidence of bin Laden's involvement in the events of 11 September 2001.

The UN Security Council, on 16 January 2002, unanimously established an arms embargo and the freezing of identifiable assets belonging to bin Laden, al-Qaeda, and the remaining Taliban.

=== Combat operations start ===
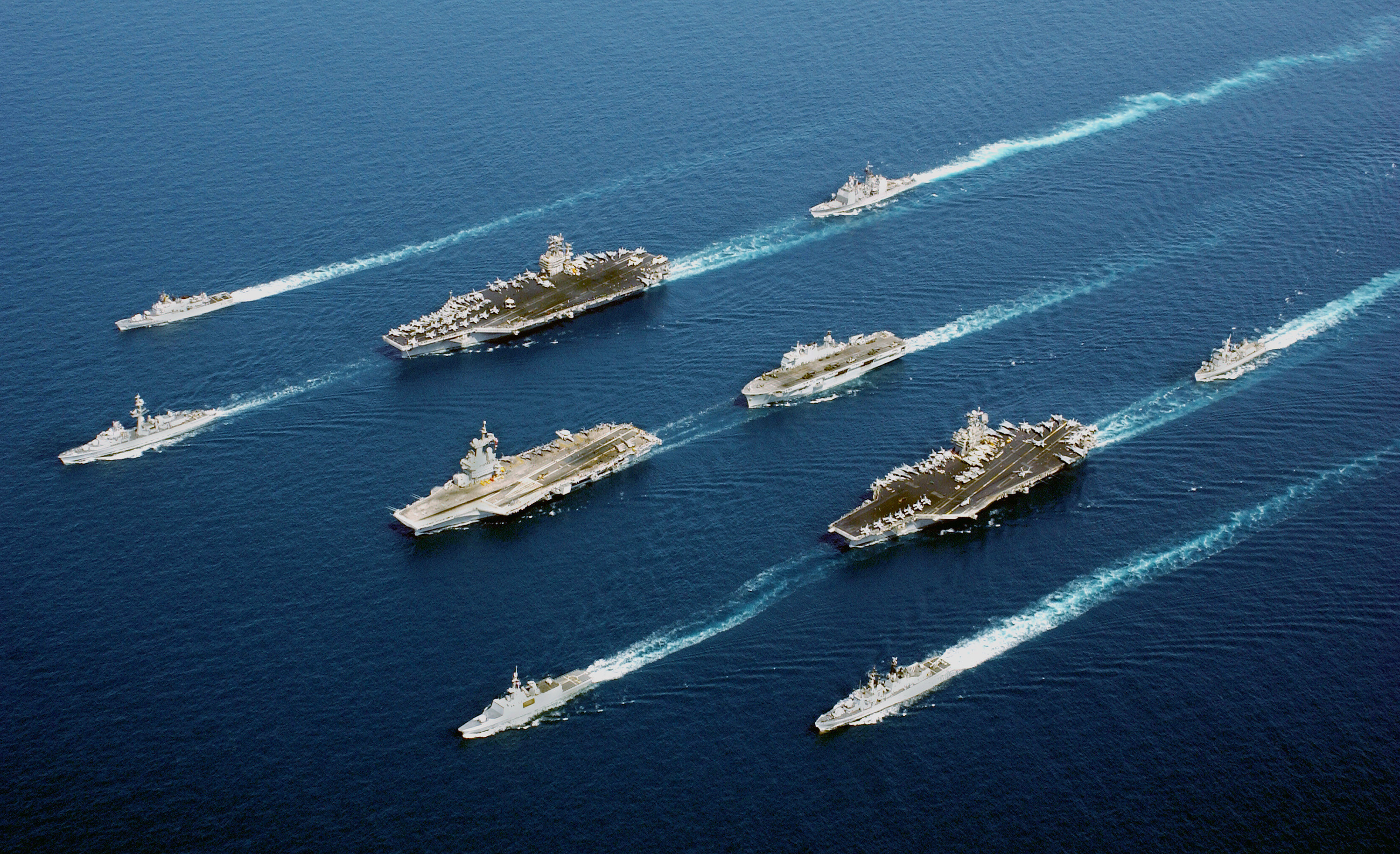
5-country multinational fleet, during Operation Enduring Freedom in the Oman Sea. In four descending columns, from left to right: Maestrale, De Grasse; USS John C. Stennis, Charles de Gaulle, Surcouf; USS Port Royal, HMS Ocean, USS John F. Kennedy, HNLMS Van Amstel; and Luigi Durand de la Penne

On Sunday 7 October 2001, American and British warplanes began fighting Taliban forces and al-Qaeda. Cruise missiles were fired from warships.

The Northern Alliance, aided by Joint Special Operations teams consisting of Green Berets from the 5th Special Forces Group, aircrew members from the 160th Special Operations Aviation Regiment (SOAR), and Air Force Combat Controllers, fought against the Taliban. Aided by U.S. bombing and massive defections, they captured Mazar-i-Sharif on 9 November. They then rapidly gained control of most of northern Afghanistan, and took control of Kabul on 13 November after the Taliban unexpectedly fled the city. The Taliban were restricted to a smaller and smaller region, with Kunduz, the last Taliban-held city in the north, captured on 26 November. Most of the Taliban fled to Pakistan.

The war continued in the south of the country, where the Taliban retreated to Kandahar. Whilst in Kandahar the Taliban agreed to surrender but the deal was rejected by Secretary of Defense Donald Rumsfeld as it would have provided amnesty to Taliban leader Mullah Mohammed Omar. After Kandahar fell in December, remnants of the Taliban and al-Qaeda continued to mount resistance. Meanwhile, in November 2001 the U.S. military and its allied forces established their first ground base in Afghanistan to the south west of Kandahar, known as FOB Rhino.

The Battle of Tora Bora, involving U.S., German, British and Northern Alliance forces took place in December 2001 to further destroy the Taliban and suspected al-Qaeda in Afghanistan. In early March 2002 the United States military, along with allied Afghan military forces, conducted a large operation to destroy al-Qaeda in an operation code-named Operation Anaconda.

The operation was carried out by elements of the United States 10th Mountain Division, 101st Airborne Division, the U.S. special forces groups TF 11, TF Bowie, TF Dagger, TF K-Bar, British Royal Marines, the Norwegian Forsvarets Spesialkommando, Hærens Jegerkommando and Marinejegerkommandoen, Canada's 3rd Battalion Princess Patricia's Canadian Light Infantry, Canada's Joint Task Force 2, the German KSK, and elements of the Australian Special Air Service Regiment and of the New Zealand Special Air Service and the Afghan National Army.

After managing to evade U.S. forces throughout the summer of 2002, the remnants of the Taliban gradually began to regain their confidence. A U.S. and Canadian led operation (supported by British and Dutch forces), Operation Mountain Thrust was launched in May 2006 to counter renewed Taliban insurgency.

Since January 2006, the NATO International Security Assistance Force undertook combat duties from Operation Enduring Freedom in southern Afghanistan, the NATO force chiefly made up of British, Canadian and Dutch forces (and some smaller contributions from Denmark, Romania and Estonia and air support from Norway as well as air and artillery support from the U.S.) (see the article Coalition combat operations in Afghanistan in 2006). The United States military also conducts military operations separate from NATO as part of Operation Enduring Freedom in other parts of Afghanistan, in areas such as Kandahar, Bagram, and Kabul (including Camp Eggers and Camp Phoenix.)

=== International support ===
The United States was supported by several nations during Operation Enduring Freedom (OEF) in Afghanistan in 2001–2003 and in subsequent coalition operations directly or indirectly in support of OEF. See the article Afghanistan War order of battle for the disposition of coalition forces in Afghanistan as of 2012.

=== Result ===
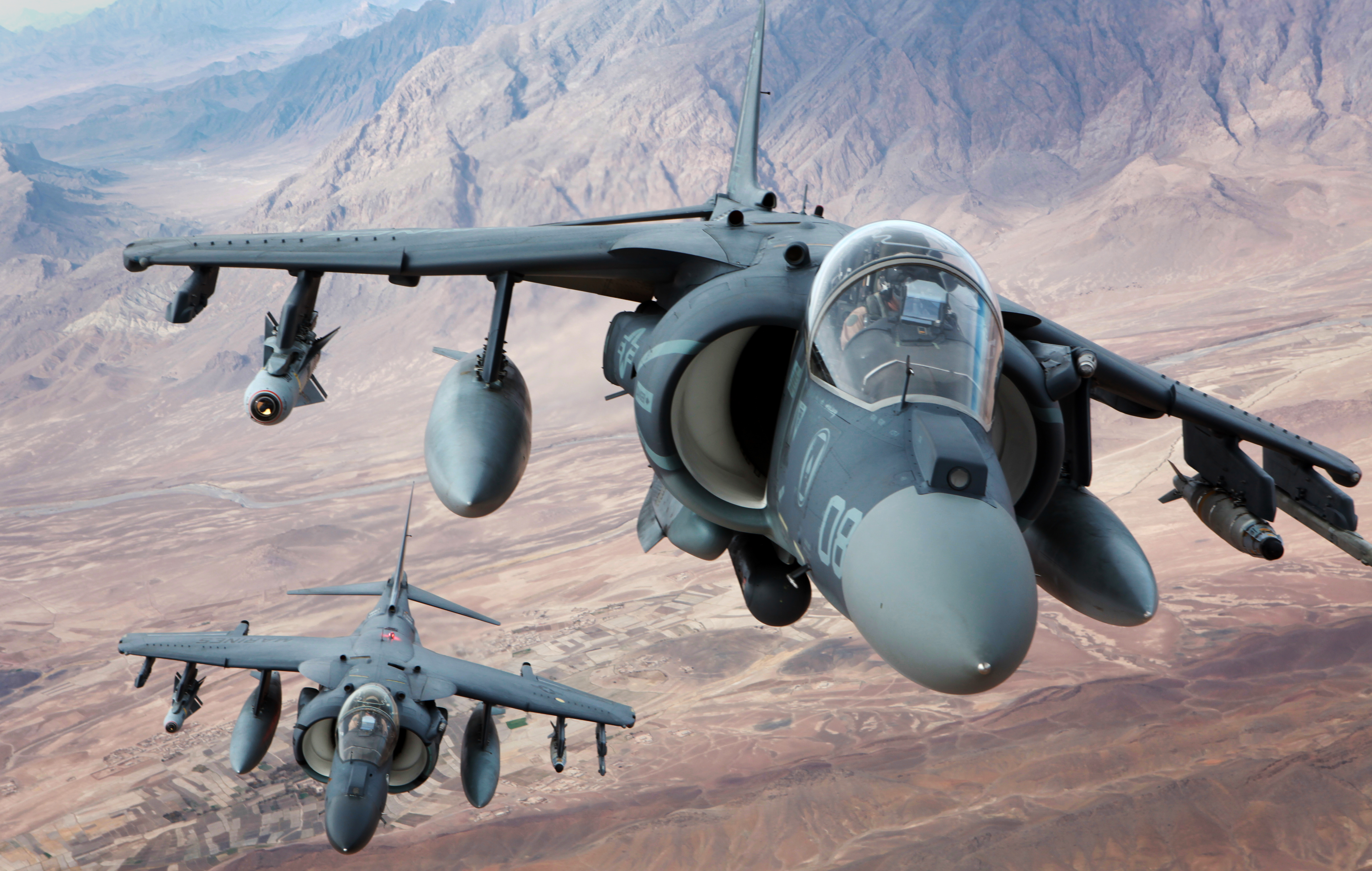
AV-8B Harrier IIs from the United States Marine Corps' VMA-231 provide close air support over Helmand Province in December 2012.

The U.S.-led coalition initially removed the Taliban from power and seriously crippled al-Qaeda and associated militants in Afghanistan. However, success in quelling the Taliban insurgency since the 2001 invasion has faltered. As the war dragged on, the Taliban demonstrated they could not be defeated also thanks to sanctuary in neighboring Pakistan.

On 9 October 2004, Afghanistan elected Hamid Karzai president in its first direct elections. The following year, Afghans conducted the 2005 Afghan parliamentary election on 18 September. Since the invasion, hundreds of schools and mosques have been constructed, millions of dollars in aid have been distributed, and the occurrence of violence has been reduced.

While military forces interdicted insurgents and assured some form of security, Provincial reconstruction teams were tasked with infrastructure building, such as constructing roads and bridges, assisting during floods, and providing food and water to refugees. Many warlords have participated in an allegiance program, formally recognizing the legitimacy of the government of Afghanistan, and formally surrendering their soldiers and weapons. Subsequent actions have led to questions about their true loyalties.

The Afghan National Army, Afghan National Police, and Afghan Border Police were being trained to assume the task of securing their nation.

On 31 December 2014, Operation Enduring Freedom concluded, and was succeeded by Operation Freedom's Sentinel on 1 January 2015.

In 2020, the US left Afghanistan to the Taliban under an agreement ensuring a safe passage for American forces out of the country by mid 2021. On 15 August 2021, all of Afghanistan, besides Kabul, was back in the hands of Taliban. By August 31, all US and allied forces departed the Hamid Karzai International Airport, thus ending any official operations within Afghanistan.

=== Criticism ===
Hardliner newspapers in Iran and religious scholars in Lebanon suggested "Infinite Imperialism", "Infinite Arrogance", or "Infinite Injustice" might have been more appropriate name for the operation.

AFP, reporting on a news story in the Sunday, 3 April 2004, issue of The New Yorker, wrote that retired Army Colonel Hy Rothstein, "who served in the Army Special Forces for more than 20 years [and was] commissioned by the Pentagon to examine the war in Afghanistan, concluded the conflict created conditions that have given 'warlordism, banditry and opium production a new lease on life.' "

The conduct of U.S. forces was criticised in a report entitled Enduring Freedom – Abuses by U.S. Forces in Afghanistan by U.S.-based human rights group Human Rights Watch in 2004. Some Pakistani scholars, such as Masood Ashraf Raja, editor of Pakistaniaat, have also provided a more specific form of criticism that relates to the consequences of the Global War on Terrorism on the region.

== Operation Enduring Freedom – Philippines (OEF-P) ==
=== Abu Sayyaf Group ===
The Abu Sayyaf Group (ASG) Al Harakat Al Islamiyya, is deemed a "foreign terrorist organization" by the United States government. Specifically, it is an Islamist separatist group based in and around the southern islands of the Republic of the Philippines, primarily Jolo, Basilan, and Mindanao.

Since inception in the early 1990s, the group has carried out bombings, assassinations, kidnappings, and extortion in their fight for an independent Islamic state in western Mindanao and the Sulu Archipelago. Its claimed overarching goal is to create a Pan-Islamic superstate across the Malay portions of Southeast Asia, spanning, from east to west, the large island of Mindanao, the Sulu Archipelago (Basilan and Jolo islands), the large island of Borneo (Malaysia and Indonesia), the South China Sea, and the Malay Peninsula (Peninsular Malaysia, Thailand and Myanmar).

=== Jemaah Islamiyah ===
Jemaah Islamiyah is a militant Islamic terrorist organization dedicated to the establishment of a fundamentalist Islamic theocracy in Southeast Asia, in particular Indonesia, Singapore, Brunei, Malaysia, the south of Thailand and the Philippines. Jemaah Islamiyah originally used peaceful means to achieve its goals, but later resorted to terrorism because of its connections with al-Qaeda.

Financial links between Jemaah Islamiyah and other terrorist groups, such as Abu Sayyaf and al-Qaeda, have been found to exist. Jemaah Islamiyah means "Islamic Group" or "Islamic Community" and is often abbreviated JI.

Jemaah Islamiyah is thought to have killed hundreds of civilians. Also, it is suspected of carrying out the Bali car bombing on 12 October 2002, in which suicide bombers attacked a nightclub killing 202 people and wounding many more. Most of the casualties were Australian tourists. After this attack, the U.S. State Department designated Jemaah Islamiyah as a Foreign Terrorist Organization. Jemaah Islamiyah is also suspected of carrying out the Zamboanga bombings, the Metro Manila bombings, the 2004 Australian embassy bombing and the 2005 Bali terrorist bombing.

=== U.S. actions ===
In January 2002, 1,200 Members of United States Special Operations Command, Pacific (SOCPAC) were deployed to the Philippines to assist the Armed Forces of the Philippines (AFP) in uprooting al-Qaeda, Jemaah Islamiyah and Abu Sayyaf. The members of SOCPAC were assigned to assist in military operations against the terrorist forces as well as humanitarian operations for the island of Basilan, where most of the conflict was expected to take place.

The United States Special Forces (SF) Unit trained and equipped special forces and scout rangers of the AFP, creating the Light Reaction Company (LRC). The LRC and elements of SOCPAC deployed to Basilan on completion of their training. The stated goals of the deployment were denying the ASG sanctuary, surveiling, controlling, and denying ASG routes, surveiling supporting villages and key personnel, conducting local training to overcome AFP weaknesses and sustain AFP strengths, supporting operations by the AFP "strike force" (LRC) in the area of responsibility (AOR), conducting and supporting civil affairs operations in the AOR.

=== Result ===
The desired result was for the AFP to gain sufficient capability to locate and destroy the ASG, to recover hostages and to enhance the legitimacy of the Philippine government. Much of the operation was a success: the ASG was driven from Basilan and one U.S. hostage was recovered. The Abu Sayyaf Group's ranks, which once counted more than 800 members, was reduced to less than 100. The humanitarian portion of the operation, Operation Smiles, created 14 schools, 7 clinics, 3 hospitals and provided medical care to over 18,000 residents of Basilan. Humanitarian groups were able to continue their work without fear of further kidnappings and terrorists attacks by the Abu Sayyaf Group.

== Operation Enduring Freedom – Horn of Africa (OEF-HOA) ==
Unlike other operations contained in Operation Enduring Freedom, OEF-HOA does not have a specific terrorist organization as a target. OEF-HOA instead focuses its efforts to disrupt and detect terrorist activities in the region and to work with host nations to deny the reemergence of terrorist cells and activities. Operations began in mid-2002 at Camp Lemonnier by a Combined Joint Special Operations Task Force (CJSOTF) augmented by support forces from Fort Stewart, Fort Hood, and Fort Story. In October 2002, the Combined Joint Task Force, Horn of Africa (CJTF-HOA) was established at Djibouti at Camp Lemonnier, taking over responsibilities from the CJSOTF. CJTF-HOA comprised approximately 2,000 personnel including U.S. military and Special Operations Forces (SOF), and coalition force members, Combined Task Force 150 (CTF-150). The coalition force consists of ships from Australia, Canada, France, Germany, Netherlands, India, Italy, Pakistan, New Zealand, Spain, Turkey and the United Kingdom. The primary goal of the coalition forces is to monitor, inspect, board and stop suspected shipments from entering the Horn of Africa region. Since 2003, the U.S. Military also conducts operations targeting Al-Qaeda-linked fighters in Somalia, these operations had reportedly killed between 113 and 136 militants by early 2016. On 7 March 2016, a further 150 were killed in U.S. airstrikes on an al Shabaab training camp north of Mogadishu.

CJTF-HOA has devoted the majority of its efforts to train selected armed forces units of the countries of Djibouti, Kenya and Ethiopia in counterterrorism and counterinsurgency tactics. Humanitarian efforts conducted by CJTF-HOA include the rebuilding of schools and medical clinics, as well as providing medical services to those countries whose forces are being trained. The program expands as part of the Trans-Saharan Counter Terrorism Initiative as CJTF personnel also assist in training the forces of Chad, Niger, Mauritania and Mali.

=== U.S. action ===
"Operation Enduring Freedom"

International Security Assistance Force (ISAF) patch

- 7 October 2001 – 28 December 2014
- Casualties U.S. Coalition: 3,486 Dead
- Taliban/Al-Qaeda:25,500–40,500 Dead

Anti-piracy operations were undertaken by the coalition throughout 2006 with a battle fought in March when US vessels were attacked by pirates. In January 2007, during the war in Somalia, an AC-130 airstrike was conducted against al-Qaeda members embedded with forces of the Islamic Courts Union (ICU) operating in southern Somalia near Ras Kamboni. US naval forces, including the aircraft carrier USS Dwight D. Eisenhower, were positioned off the coast of Somalia to provide support and to prevent any al-Qaeda forces escaping by sea. Actions against pirates also occurred in June and October 2007 with varying amounts of success.

"Operation Resolute Support/Freedom's Sentinel"

- 1 January 2015 – Present
- Casualties U.S. Coalition: 1 January 2015 – Present | 70 Dead* – Subject to change
- Taliban/Al-Qaeda:

Effective 1 January 2015, Secretary of Defense Hagel announced that the new U.S. mission in Afghanistan will focus on training, advising, and assisting Afghan security forces and designated as Operation Freedom's Sentinel. 19 About 13,500 U.S. troops are expected in Afghanistan through 2015 and will be assisted by troops from NATO allies.

== Military decorations ==
Since 2002, the United States military has created military awards and decorations related to Operation Enduring Freedom

- Afghanistan Campaign Medal

NATO also created a military decoration related to Operation Enduring Freedom:

- Non-Article 5 ISAF NATO Medal

== See also ==
- Operation Herrick
- Coalition casualties in Afghanistan
