= Pakistani textbooks controversies =

Claimed inaccuracies and historical denialism

There have been various controversies and criticisms of Pakistani textbooks for schools and universities. Many concern claimed inaccuracies & historical denialism. These inaccuracies & or myths are said to promote religious intolerance, Indophobia & have led to calls for curriculum reform. According to the Sustainable Development Policy Institute, Pakistan's textbooks among the nations school system have systematically inculcated as being anti-Indian discriminatory through historical omissions & deliberately been a bit of misinformation since as far back as the 1970s.

The revisionism can be traced as far back as the rule of General Muhammad Zia-ul-Haq, who instituted a program of Islamization of the country. His 1979 policy stated that the highest priority be given to the revision of the curriculum with a view to reorganize the entire content revolving around Islamic thought & giving education an ideological orientation so that Islamic ideology permeates the thinking of a younger generation in an effort to assist them with what he deemed the necessary convictions & an ability to transform society all according to Islamic tenets. In March 2016, Senate Chairman Raza Rabbani, from the upper house of the Pakistani Parliament addressed that since then, these same Pakistani textbooks have taught young minds more of the benefits of the performance of a dictatorship rather than that of an actual democracy.

== Context ==
During the first decade, following the Pakistan gained independence, also followed the partition of India, Pakistan considered its known history to be a considerably a larger part of India, a common and joint history, that in fact Indian textbooks were in use in the syllabus in Pakistan. The government, under Ayub Khan, however, persisted that a rewrite about the history of Pakistan exclude any references to India & tasked historians, within Pakistan, with the manufacturing a nationalist narrative of an all together separate history that erased any Indian past. According to Hussain Haqqani, only officially published textbooks have been used in Pakistani schools & colleges since the era of Ayub Khan. These textbooks are used by the Pakistani government to create an altered, but standard narrative of Pakistan's history. Elizabeth A. Cole, of the George Mason University School for Conflict Analysis and Resolution, noted that these Pakistani textbooks eliminate any of the country's Hindu and/or Buddhist past, referring only to the nation's Muslim past as the monolithic entity, with focus being solely on the advent of Islam within the Indian subcontinent. During the rule of General Muhammad Zia-ul-Haq, is when this program of Islamization of the country began, including that among the education systems textbooks. General Zia's, 1979 education policy, stated that the highest priority be given to the revision of any curriculum with a view into reorganizing the entire content to be solely around the Islamization thought; therefore producing education as an ideological orientation so that Islamic ideology in an effort to permeate the thinking of the younger generations & helps with necessary conviction, as well as an ability to refashion society according to Islamic tenets". Since the 21st century, the contributions of Nehru, Mahatma Gandhi, Ambedkar, Patel and Bose to the Indian independence movement have been significantly reduced from and within the Pakistani textbooks.

According to the Sustainable Development Policy Institute, as far back as the 1970s, the Pakistan textbooks within the public education system have systematically inculcated prejudice towards India, as well as Hindus through historical revisionism. These textbooks incite strong emotional accounts among students and have even fostered extremism and fanaticism within the impressionable minds of the Pakistani youth.

=== The undermining of democratic values and of constitutionalism ===
In March 2016, Senate Chairman Raza Rabbani, from the upper house of the Pakistani Parliament has acknowledged that the curriculum created under Zia's ruling, within the Pakistani textbooks was continuing to teach children about the twelve (12) benefits of a dictatorship compared to that of just eight (8) of a democracy.

== Textbooks of religious education ==
In Pakistan, since the 1980s Islamiyat (Islam) is a compulsory subject at every educational level. Since 2018 the Punjab province of Pakistan provided for Nazrah Quran (recitation of the Arabic text) to be an active part of the curriculum in classes I to V as well as the reading translation of the Quran in classes VI-XII to be made mandatory, as per the Punjab Compulsory Teaching of the Holy Quran Act 2018.

In Punjab, a board representing the Islamic clergy, known as the Muttahida Ulema Board held the right to censor any educational content. This curriculum and textbook board proposed and passed an (Amendment) bill, unanimously in 2020 providing them with additional rights to adhere to the pre-screening of any Islamic-related content within all Pakistani textbooks, to include those of: Islamiyat, Pakistan studies, history and Urdu literature. In June 2020, another Governor's decree passed of Quranic examination be mandatory before receiving any acquired completion of a university degree. According to Baela Raza Jamil, in June 2020 the legislative changes in the Punjab province of Pakistan, would compromise any education if based on freedom of inquiry and critical thinking in the nation, Pakistan. Huma Yusuf expressed surprise over the obvious misplaced priorities among the Pakistani education, wherein right-wing-washing of the educational content was being prioritized over an overall accurate education in the sciences, technology, engineering, mathematics and critical thinking.

A voluntary body of educators, known as Working Group on Inclusive Education (WGIE), expressed their serious reservations about the legislative measures there in the Punjab Pakistan province to be compromising diversity & any religious freedoms as well.

According to a study by Muhammad Azeem Ashraf, conducted at the Hunan University in Changsha, most of the teaching faculty members of those in Pakistan were to believe, Pakistan to be Islamic country and Islam to be associated with nationalism. As such, Islam can only be introduced through religious education, including for the most part as only Sunni Islam which leads to the exclusion of any minority religious thoughts and/or beliefs from education, Pakistani citizenship and their human rights.

The discoveries highlight the pervasive influence of the radical Islam procurement within the Pakistan nation and is a shedding light on a number of reasons behind the tendency to support, tolerate and/or possibly condone terrorism. The educational materials utilized there in the Pakistani schools and in the education curriculum have contributing role to the promotion of any prejudice & intolerance towards Hindus, as well as other religious minorities in the nation. Moreover, a significant number of educators tend to perceive non-Muslims as "enemies of Islam." Pakistani textbooks clearly depict the non-Muslim citizens of Pakistan in a negatively biased manner, often characterizing religious beliefs such as Pakistani Christians to be representatives of Western and/or British colonial powers while Pakistani Hindus are the minorities within the Muslim-majority population with affiliations to India. This portrayal fosters tendencies such as hostility & even animosity. These history books are contaminating, not to mention indoctrinating to the minds of the youth done so with a deliberate propagation of false narratives and rigid ideologies.

== Textbooks of Journalism in Pakistan ==
According to Dr Naazir Mahmood, textbooks on journalism in Pakistan fail to cover critical thinking, knowledge development, freedom of speech, gender studies, minority rights, human rights, democracy, and constitutionalism, as well as health education and other developmental studies. Mahmood says that, as a result, Pakistani journalists promote rather than question jingoistic, insular, narrow minded narratives, condoning and even promoting hate speech and sectarianism against religious minorities in Pakistan. Many senior journalists, and observers of the media in Pakistan often complain about new or younger media professionals who have become self-styled promoters of chauvinism, jingoism and sectarian tendencies in the country.

== Reception and analysis ==
In a 1995, a segment published within the International Journal of Middle East Studies, focused on a newly invented subject of 'Pakistan studies, historian Ayesha Jalal noted a large extent of creative imagination in the creation of the state historiography, to carve out a national past based on hegemonic values. She remarked on Pakistan's history textbooks as being an example of the relationship that correlates between power & that of bigotry, in regards to the rigid state-controlled education system alongside the curriculum promoting a revisionist set of detailed history written to satisfy its national ideology.

These authors vastly vary in establishing the history of the Pakistani nation-state. Jalal goes on to deem this an example of basic narrative confusion that resulted from tensions between the ideology of Muslim nationalism & the geographical limitations of the Pakistani nation-state. While some pan-Islamic ideologists locate the time-frame to correspond with the birth of Islam on the Arabian Peninsula & intentionally choose to ignore the spatial while temporal distance between the two non-concerted happenings, others have opted for a sub-continental approach. An Introduction to Pakistan Studies, (a popular text-book which is compulsory reading for first and second year college students studying for an Fine Arts (FA) degree in history), claims that Pakistan is an Islamic State, governed by Allah & is not a mere geographical entity but more of an ideology reflecting a unique civilization and or culture that was born of an effort to resist the imposition of Hindu Nationalism on any Muslim masses to ward the unethical practices of Hinduism. Another textbook – A Text Book of Pakistan Studies goes on to claim that Pakistan "came to be established for the first time when the Arabs, under Muhammad bin Qasim, occupied Sindh and Multan & thereafter equates to the Indian subcontinent with Pakistan, their greatest ruler being subsequently deemed as Aurangzeb. Anti-Indian sentiments, coupled with anti-Hindu prejudices compound these issues. K. Ali's two volume history designed for Bachelor of Arts (BA) students, even whilst tracing the pre-history of the Indo-Pakistan subcontinent to the Paleolithic discussion of the Dravidian peoples as well as the Aryans, consistently refers to the post 1947 era of frontiers of the Pakistan nation. By the end, he supports the existence of the nation-state, reliant upon religious ideology, in light of the need to immunize themselves from, said to be, Hindu hostility that is displayed to the Muslims during an independence movement & the fact that the subcontinent was ruled by Muslims in previous centuries.

There are scholars, such as Jameel Jalibi, that question any validity of the notated national history with mentions of Pakistan's pre-Islamic past. Jalal noted on Ali's assertions to establish a type of reactive religious bigotry as to be a basis of Pakistan's statehood. Secularism (Communism et al.) are assumptively depicted as that of evil threats to the state & Jalal notes a textbook wherein Zulfikar Ali Bhutto was even described to be characterized as labels such as: a drunkard, to be characterless & an un-Islamic-minded man due to his socio political leanings towards communism; however Zia ul Hak & his dictatorial marital regime are extensively praised for its abidance by Islamic ideologies. In light of the Balochs (Sindhis et al.) being increasingly vocal about their regional culture, one (1) textbook identifies regionalism as being a "very dangerous episode", going on to mention that efforts to advance regional dialects and lores was an attack on the very foundations of the state and that Punjabism shall never be allowed to replace the Islamic culture, because its patron figures had waged wars against Islamic rulers. Textbooks frequently denote Urdu as being superior to regional dialects; a flag-bearer of collective Islamic identity if you will.

All these narratives, though offering arguments of varying dimensions & scope, ultimately still support the national policy for the Islamization of the state as well as the principle of the two-nation theory, wherein any trifecta of the Muslims, Islam and Pakistan cannot effectively be appropriately challenged. Jalal accused them of discarding Jinnah's calls for secularism, with it being the opposition of a number of the Muslims partition & subjugation of regional communities & per their very own convenience. She went on to note there being a broader purpose being served by educating the future generations to reject discrepancies among their regional cultures & it fails to qualify as Islamic & moreover a strive for a spiritual or cultural hegemony, all in the name of Islam. Anti-Indian sentiments, coupled with anti-Hindu prejudices compound these issues.

According to Tufts University, professor Seyyed Vali Reza Nasr, Indophobia among the Pakistan nation increased with the ascendancy of the militant Islamist Jamaat-e-Islami while under the regime of Sayyid Abul Ala Maududi. Indophobia, together with Anti-Hinduism as well as the racist ideologies (such as the martial race theory), were driving factors that became the appropriate curriculum among the school textbooks within the Pakistan education system; that being in both the secular schools, as well as the Islamic Madrassas in what appeared to be an effort in promoting a biased, revisionist historiography of the Indian subcontinent that promulgated Indophobic & anti-Hindu prejudices. These narratives, being combined with Islamist propaganda, in the extensive revising of Pakistan's history. In propagating concepts, such as, but not limited to jihad, that being the inferiority of any non-Muslims & India's perceived ingrained enmity with Pakistan, among many, that the textbook board publications utilized within all government education to promote an obscurantist mindset.

According to one historian, Professor Mubarak Ali, a textbook reform in Pakistan began with the introduction of Pakistan & Islamic studies, inhabited by Zulfiqar Ali Bhutto in 1971, by placing it into the national curriculum via, compulsory subject. Former military dictator, Muhammad Zia-ul-Haq, under a general drive towards Islamization, initially began this process, of historical revisionism, in earnest & did exploit the initiative, according to an opinion piece from The Guardian, written by Afnan Khan

The Pakistani establishment instilled at a young & impressionable age that this state was built on the basis of religion, hence being the reason for the extremely low tolerance for any other religions & any want, need & or desire to attempt to end all of them. According to a Pakistani physicist, Pervez Hoodbhoy, the Islamist revisionism of Pakistan's education system initially began in 1976, when an act of parliament required all government, along with private schools (except those teaching the British O levels from grade 9) were mandated to follow a curriculum that includes learning outcomes for the federally approved grade 5 social studies class such as: acknowledge & identify forces that may be working against Pakistan, make speeches on Jihad, collect pictures of policemen, soldiers, national guards, as well as India's evil designs against Pakistan. Likewise, Yvette Rosser criticized Pakistani textbooks for propagating jingoist & irredentist beliefs about Pakistan's history as well as its culture & even being negationist in its depiction of political Islam & as to the treatment of minorities in Pakistan, such as Hindus and Christians. Irredentism is manifested through claims of eternal Pakistan (despite the country being created from British India, only in 1947), narrow & sectarian interpretation of Islam, to be downplaying the tolerant aspects of the religion by focusing on Islamic Fundamentalist interpretations (for example, all banking being considered un-Islamic), as well as making unsubstantiated accusations of dual loyalty on minority Hindus and Christians among those in Pakistan.

According to a Pakistani professor, Tariq Rahman, the Pakistani textbooks cannot mention Hindus without calling them cunning, scheming, deceptive and/or something equally insulting. The textbooks clearly ignore any pre-Islamic history of Pakistan, except to attempt a negative perception of the Hindu predecessors in any negative aspect.

Another Pakistani historian Khursheed Kamal Aziz, similarly criticised these Pakistani history textbooks, stating that they were full of a number of historical errors and made a suggestion of a mandatory study amounted to teaching such prescribed myths. After examining sixty six (66) different textbooks that were being utilized at various levels of study Aziz argued that these textbooks were in support of a military rule in Pakistan, promoting hatred for Hindus, glorified wars and distorted any prior Pakistan history before 1947.

A study by Lftikhar Ahmad, a Long Island University professor, published an article titled, Current Issues in Comparative Education in 2004 that lead to some conclusions that were derivative of content analysis among the social studies textbooks in Pakistan. The first being that the selection of material and the thematic sequence in the textbooks present Islam to not just simply as a belief system, but more of an actual political ideology and a grand, unifying, worldview required be accepted by all Pakistan citizens. The next being to sanctify this Islamic ideology as an article of faith considering that the textbooks distort actual historical facts about the nation's cultural as well as its political heritage. The third being that the main objective of the social studies textbooks on Pakistan studies, civics and the global studies, is to indoctrinate children for a clearly romanticised Islamic state, as conceptualized by Islamic theocrats. The fourth was stated as being that despite the vocabulary in the textbooks, it underscores Islamic virtues, such as: piety, obedience & submission. Very little is mentioned of subjects such as: critical thinking, civic participation & or democratic values like freedom of speech, equality & or dual respect for & of any cultural diversity.

In 2003, a study by Nayyar & Salim of the Sustainable Development Policy Institute concluded there is an increasing trend with children being taught during among Pakistan Studies, to be a replacement for the teaching of subjects such as history & geography to be full-fledged disciplines. Previously, they were lead to believe that the very early pre-Islamic history of South Asia, its contribution to be that of the rich culturally diverse of modern-day Pakistan. This long, historical perspective of Pakistan is an absent lesson among the Pakistan education system textbooks. Instead, children are now being taught that the history of their nation initially behan from that of the time when the first of the Muslim people first entered India. The study reported that the textbooks also contained a many gender-biased segments & other perspectives that encouraging prejudice, bigotry & discrimination towards their fellow Pakistanis & other nations, with a targeted acknowledgment against most religious minorities. There was also reported omissions of concepts, such as ones that could encourage critical self-awareness among the students".

Rubina Saigol, a known Pakistani scholar & feminist, stated "I have been arguing for the longest time that, in fact, our state system is the biggest Madrassah. We keep blaming Madrassah for everything & of course they are doing a lot of things I would disagree with, but the state ideologies of hate & a violent, negative nationalism are getting out there where Madrassah cannot hope to reach."

Referring to the National Council of Education Research & Training (NCERT) with their extensive review of textbooks in India in 2004, Verghese, considered the erosion of plural & of democratic values in the textbooks within India's education systems & the distortion of history in Pakistan which was to imply a necessity for coordination among the Bangladeshi, Indian & Pakistani historians in an effort to accurately produce a composite history of the subcontinent, as a common South Asian reader.

However, international scholars also warn that any attempt at education reform, under international pressure or market demands should not overlook any specified expectation of its people on local levels.

=== Bangladesh & Balochistan Narratives ===
According to Ali Riaz, South Asian nations curtail academic freedom of expression to secure their respective national identities. Pakistani school curriculum conceals any history of the Bangladesh separation with conspiracy theories, as well as concealing the history of the genocide committed by Pakistan's armed forces in Bangladesh. He stated that the curriculum about Kashmir & Balochistan only provide a single-sided version of events.

== Examples ==
The following excerpts showcase the discriminatory and agitated nature of Pakistani school textbooks:

- The Class III (ages 7–8) book (Punjab Textbook Board) on Urdu teaches in accordance with Islam being superior to other religions.
- The Class VII (ages 11–12) book (Sindh Textbook Board) on Islamic Studies reads: "Most other religions of the world claim equality, but they never act on it."
- The Class VIII (ages 12–13) book (Punjab Textbook Board) on Islamic Studies reads: "Honesty for non-Muslims is merely a business strategy, while for Muslims it is a matter of faith."
- The Class V (ages 9–10) book (Punjab Textbook Board) on Social Studies says: "Religion plays a very important role in promoting national harmony. If the entire population believes in one religion, then it encourages nationalism and promotes national harmony."
- The Class VI book (Punjab Textbook Board) on Islamic Studies says: "Though being a student, you cannot practically participate in jihad, but you may provide financial support for jihad."
- The Class IV (ages 8–9) book (Punjab Textbook Board) on Urdu says: "The better a Muslim we become, the better a citizen we prove to be."

== Controversies about Sectarianism ==
=== Sindh ===
In spite of a double expert review, one (1) grade VII book of Social Studies, in Sindh, came under criticism from Muttahida Qaumi Movement (MQM), since Pro-Pakistan emigrants who came from Bangladesh were being termed as being escapees rather than Pakistanis, in the textbook. The Sindh provincial government agreed to remove the controversial content in its following future editions.

=== Punjab ===
In a matter on Sociology textbooks, grade 12th within the education system in the Punjab province that was describing the Baloch people as being "uncivilized people engaged in murder & looting" was criticised within the Pakistani Parliament's upper house in 2016.

== Closure of Iranian schools in Balochistan ==
In June 2021, the Pakistani government closed down eight (8) Iranian schools in Quetta, despite a thirty (30) year old Memorandum of Understanding, for (alleged) teachings of an unauthorized foreign curriculum in the Persian language.

== Textbook Board Administrative Controversies ==
In 2018, one (1) of the Textbook Board's of Sindh's chairmen found himself under judicial scrutiny due to financial mismanagement & to be contempt of court.

== Pluralistic reform efforts ==
In 2011, Fazalur Rahim Marwat, the chairman of the textbook board of Khyber Pakhtunkhwa, stated that a reform of textbooks was to be undertaken within the state. Also stating that previously, textbooks had played a key role in spreading hatred against non-Muslims, particularly against Hindus & distorted history. Such material had now been removed from the textbooks used in the state. Professor Marwat previously blamed General Zia for what he stated as "sowing seeds of discord in society on religious & ethnic lines by stuffing school curriculum with material that promoted hatred now manifested in the shape of extremism, intolerance, militancy, sectarianism, dogmatism & fanaticism". In addition, he also stated, "after the Indo-Pakistani War of 1965, countless lessons & chapters were introduced that spread hatred among the students & portrayed India as the biggest enemy of the Muslims. That stuff should be done away with." The Sindh province has also made efforts to reform its curriculum.

== Single National Curriculum Controversy ==
In August 2018, Prime Minister, Imran Khan's Pakistan Tehreek-e-Insaf (PTI) dispensation came into power in Pakistan. With this regime, some state assemblies, came with a revivalist promise of making a new Pakistan like 'State of Medina' (Riyasat-e-Medina), which is modeled on governance adopted by Muhammad, which also promised a Single National Curriculum (SNC Urdu: Yuksaan Taleemi Nizam) which was to eliminate Pakistan's old education system. The idea consisted of remolding the education system in Pakistan to ensure that private schools, public schools & madrasas were to follow a single unitary curriculum. The senate of Pakistan approved a law mandating compulsory teaching of the Arabic language in federally mandated & controlled schools.

According to Huma Yusuf, the Single National Curriculum (SNC) has caused controversy & a number of issues that are due to the narrowly defined religious & nationalist identity in which poorly understands the values of ethnolinguistic diversity & inclusion. Huma goes on to say that the narrowly defined religious, nationalist focus of the Single National Curriculum (SNC), includes but that is not limited to, the conflation of secular & religious subjects. An example of such being health-related life skills, such as hygiene, explained as a religious point of view, rather than in a stand-alone scientific type of manner, the constitutionality of federal fiat on provincial subjects, the treatment of language of instruction & Science, Technology, Engineering & Mathematics (STEM) topics, depiction of women, lack of essential life skills constitute & a number of other significant issues.

The focus on religious studies among the Pakistan education system initially began with the creation of Pakistan in 1947. Islamization of the Pakistan education system gained momentum in the 1970s while under General Zia-ul-Haq's military regime. He conferred with religious clerics as to every segment of the education sector & patronized them in efforts to effectively legitimize his political career. Zainab Akhter says that under Khan's term, the educational policy is taking steps which even General Zia did not take. Akhter also says that the new SNC policy fails to take into account the possibility of further radicalization of Pakistani private & or public schools, because of a curriculum that is heavily influenced by retrogressive ideological biases & distortions.

As per the Pakistan constitution, education is primarily a state (provincial) subject, so Sindh & Balochistan have not yet adopted a Single National Curriculum (SNC). The province of Khyber Pakhtunkhwa & its clergy have serious misgivings with the teaching of sciences through SNC. The government of Punjab began implementing SNC with a three (3) tier review mechanism. The first to be conducted by a five (5) member External Review Committee (ERC). The second to be performed by the clergy of the Muttahida Ulema Board (MUB). The third & final review was to be conducted by the Punjab Curriculum and Textbook Board & their own Internal Review Committee for a fee of R's & 15,000 per NOC. The cost of the two (2) reviews was left unspecified by regulations, but as per the Textbook Publishers Association's (TPA) President, Fawaz Niaz, it comes to R's of 45,000 for the Muttahida Ulema Board (MUB) and R's of 80,000 for the External Review Committees, making the total cost going to the tune of R's around 140,000 per textbook, causing an increase of up to three hundred (300) percent in futuring textbook prices. Niaz went on to say that this increased overhead & cost, introduced under SNC, was far from eradicating the class-based education system & are further leading to strengthening the class-based education system. Niaz further went on to claim that even science & mathematic books were to be subjected to evaluation by the Muttahida Ulema Board (MUB) & their clergy directed publishers were to remove words such as: interest & markup from the textbooks of mathematics. They also directed publishers to not depict diagrams & or sketches biology textbooks that displayed human figures, "sans clothes".

Meanwhile, the Federal Education Ministry (FEM) clarified that these media claims & criticism were merely speculative of religious inspection & corrections of science books, since the subject of Biology is taught from grade 9 onwards & the SNC is still to be implemented at a senior education level, however a reporter for Zenger News & Furqan Mahmood, manager of the Lahore-based publisher Urdu Bazar Depot, concurred with the claims made by Fawaz Niaz. This intel in mind also coincides with the information provided by a provincial spokesperson announcing the Muttahida Ulema Board (MUB) would review the National Single Curriculum (NSC) books under the provincial PCTB act & warned publishers of actions to be taken against those who would not get a No Objections Certificate (NOC) from the PCTB, also claiming the MUB would review only religious material included in any textbook. A PCTB spokesperson asked publishers to pay the book review fee & claimed the book review fee would not have any considerable effect on the textbook prices.

The Federal Education Ministry, while admitting that Islamic religious studies would remain mandatory to foster their religious learning across Pakistan, denied any speculations that their ministry required schools to recruit any religious graduates from Madarsa, but did say that schools were free to choose & appoint religious educators for the religious syllabus, as per their own voluntary choice. An earlier one (1) man minority commission by the name of Dr. Shoaib Suddle had recommended that the omission of Islamic teachings & history write-ups from non-religious topic textbooks, but Tahir Ashrafi, Special Representative to the Prime Minister on Interfaith Harmony, demanded action against the minority commission for forwarding such suggestions. Ashrafi went on to say that the educational curriculum approved by the Muttahida Ulema Board (MUB) just provides a message of peace, tolerance & Islamic Shariah. Dr. AH Nayyar, known scholar & educator, said that the new textbooks developed, under the Single National Curriculum (SNC) were failing in the development of critical thinking & any understanding of the importance of inclusive education among students & the implementers of the policy are adamant in enforcing religious instruction in textbooks with religiously neutral subjects, despite the apex court's clear directions.

Dr. Ayesha Razzaque stated that the publishers also criticized the Single National Curriculum (SNC) in Punjab for not allowing (public/private) schools to deliver above & beyond the Single National Curriculum (SNC). Pakistan's, Punjab province has explicitly disallowed the teaching of subjects such as: computer studies, art, music, handwriting, drama, among others, with the reasoning of it should not overburden children & that the Single National Curriculum (SNC) was prepared by the government & already well-balanced being enough for children on the primary level. Razzaque went on to say that the new Single National Curriculum (SNC) also restricts the freedom of private schools to teach science to students beginning at an early age. Pervez Hoodbhoy stated that the new Single National Curriculum (SNC) surpasses previous censorship involving human evolution from academic studies & in Pakistan, the nation which consumes high levels of pornography and instances of Madrasah teachers engaging in child sexual abuse; scientific teaching of human biology through requisite educational images is being shunned with extended enforcement of religious modesty on the school curriculum. Hoodbhoy went on to say that the extended claims of religious modesty are hampering medical facilitation to women, since Islamist clergy falsely claim that men can derive pleasure even from an Electrocardiogram (ECG) or an ultrasound of female bodies. Discussions on breasts, ovarian cancer, cervical cancer & child education against sexual abuse has become difficult & over time the Pakistan Tehreek e Insaf (PTI) Single National Curriculum (SNC) school curriculum, supervised by the clergy, will magnify body-related taboos. Hoodbhoy followed up with saying that unsated curiosity & sexual repression is a result administered by the Pakistani clergy as to pose issues, including, but not limited to a significantly higher consumption of pornography among the Pakistani youth. Simultaneously, the government health departments are unable to discuss simple population control mechanisms. Previously mentioned scholar, Yasmin Ashraf stated that having 20 years of experience within the primary education among the Pakistan nation, she was concerned about the newly formed Single National Curriculum (SNC) curriculum within the primary schools. Yasmin went onto say that their Islamic curriculum was massive & far larger than ever before. The syllabus being extended from a few siparas, into the entire Quran & accompanied by the rote memorisation of several surahs, ahadith & numerous duas. All that & in addition to Islamiat books as well. The new Islamiat curriculum is likely to put much more strain on primary students than ever before. Yasmin followed up with saying that the inclusion of religious matter in every subject, including general knowledge, Urdu & English, is a significant cause for concern. It is as though rather than increasing knowledge of respective subject matters, the newly implemented curriculum & education policy treats other subjects as a supplementary of Islamist religious education & places excessive focus on religious content that can inadvertently inculcate a biased sense of self-righteousness among the students amounting to be ultra vires of the spirit of Article 22-1 of the Constitution of Pakistan. Yasmin also stated that all the content chapters in the Urdu textbooks, of every single educational year, are written by a single author, in one (1) style with one (1) agenda. All in a tedious & boring manner that wipes out diversity & brings in monotony of the content. None of which is likely to catch any of the students interest, nor enrich them into becoming their best. The general knowledge textbooks of grade one (1) to grades three (3) are repetitive in nature. They lack creativity & logic, failing to fulfill the curiosity of young children, failing to encourage critical thinking & ignore the mandatory principle of textual hierarchy, which expects that the introductory topic ought to serve as the foundation for the next, more complex topic. Missing links or the in between pieces of relative information will lead to confusion & is akin to climbing a ladder with missing rungs in order to reach the top of a tall building, hence making it difficult to serve as the foundation course for Science in grade 4.

As per Dr. Ayesha Razzaque, among the committee, along with passed laws & departmental guidelines, have effectively surrendered space to far right religious clergy, all in the name of the Muttahida Ulema Board (MUB), in case of all the curriculum, the space which will be far more difficult to reverse & reclaim. Correcting inaccuracies has been left to those most vulnerable within communities & civil society activists. The legal fights to correct them, in times to come, will be dangerous to life & are politically costly.

Any textbook or curriculum on religion with contents or matter related to Islam, including Islamiyat, history, Pakistan studies, Urdu, literature & or any other subject material related to religion, shall not be published before taking prior approval from the Muttahida Ulema Board, Punjab and the Punjab Curriculum and Textbook Board shall be bound to take such approval from Muttahida Ulema Board, Punjab.

— Punjab Assembly, Pakistan., Punjab Curriculum and TextBook Board (Amendment) Bill 2020, thenews.com.pk

In an anecdote claimed to be truthful, by Dr. Ayesha Razzaque, within a science textbook picture, scientist Isaac Newton was shown wearing a long garment, likely having long hair & or wearing a wig, next to a tree depicting, the well known scientific legend in relation to the moment an apple fell. This moment said to have inspired him in the discovery of the law of gravity. One of the comments from the Punjab Curriculum and Textbook Board (Pakistan) PCTB review of the book, was that the lady in the picture be edited to add a hijab upon her head, as to observe the appropriate purdah traditions.

As per, Pervez Hoodbhoy, the Government of Pakistan settled on a compromise in accordance with the standard of education & in an effort to hybridize private schools, public schools & Madrasah education. This being done in the name of the Single National Curriculum (SNC) & introducing the rote learning of the Arabic language that in actuality provides no technical job skills.

Hoodbhoy proceeds on to say that the objectives of private schools, public schools & Madrasah education are supposed to be entirely different. Private & public education is to prepare students for an earthly life whereas Madrasah education focuses on an afterlife involving rote learning lacking scope for any critical inquiry, hence both cannot be put together. Hoodbhoy went on to say that a lack of curiosity leaves Pakistanis & Muslims devoid of an actual scientific mindset; while the traditional mindset considers knowledge to be a corpus of eternal verities to be acquired, stockpiled, disseminated, understood & applied but not modified or transformed. Whereas the scientific mindset, on the other hand, includes ideas of forming, testing & if necessary of abandoning hypotheses, if they do not work. Comprehension, reasoning, problem-solving, analytical reasoning & creativity are important & are not simple memorisation. That while Pakistan needs to invest in educational infrastructure, it is wasting money on the defense machinery. While Arab countries have money & a modern educational setup, including that of hiring the best of western brains to teach there, they are still ending up as just being the consumers of science & technology failing to show progress, considering Arab culture has become self-absorbed & centred on such self-gratification. Muslims are convinced they possess the only true religion & that Arabic is the only perfect language with claims of an eternal monopoly over actual truth & that amounts to simply narcissism, but on a civilisational scale. While simply in a new form of escapism, Pakistan is busy creating new narcissistic illusions that seek solace through this hero-worshipping of the fictionalised Ertugrul drama series & making up a Turkic-Islamic past for itself. Evidence for a further closing of the Pakistani mind is very much visible. In the Pakistani school curriculum, the study of world history, philosophy, epistemology & or comparative religions is altogether absent. PTI's, Single National Curriculum (SNC), has massively increased religious content & rote learning. The new Single National Curriculum (SNC) policy is programming the brains of Pakistani children for a world other than the one they live in. The practical implementation of a Single National Curriculum (SNC) has been publicized & made a part of the new syllabus of the Punjab School Education Department for grades one (1) through five (5). The government has commenced Single National Curriculum (SNC) training for all primary school teachers to enhance teaching skills according to this new syllabus. The Punjab government has issued a mandate to the Quaid-e-Azam Academy for Educational Development (QAED) for organizing & managing the training of public & private teachers.

Lack of Training in Essential Life Skills

According to Huma, Pakistan's young population deserves empowerment as to keep themselves healthy as well as safe as through learning the essential life skills in which the new Single National Curriculum (SNC) is detrimentally lacking. The new curriculum committee requires necessary improvements, which shall include but shall not be limited to topics such as: modules on human rights, equality, proper hygiene & other practical issues; for example sexual health & consent from secondary level education onward.

== Punjab Curriculum and Textbook Board Controversies ==
In 2020, the Punjab Curriculum and Textbook Board (PCTB) banned a known one hundred (100) textbooks, either in consideration of being deemed unethical, illegal or for being against what is known as the two-nation theory. Some other books were also said to be banned as being blasphemous & against religion.

=== Malala Yousafzai ===
On July 12, 2021, the All Pakistan Private Schools Federation (APPSF), an apex body, allegedly representing over two hundred thousand schools, across Pakistan, celebrated "I am not Malala Day", due to her views against the institution of marriage. On the same day, according to Imran Gabol, PCTB confiscated social studies textbooks of standard seven, published by Oxford University Press, allegedly for printing the picture of Malala Yousufzai on a list of important personalities. The Human Rights Commission of Pakistan (HECP) took exception to the PCTB action whereas the Federal Minister for Information and Broadcasting Chaudhry Fawad Hussain distanced his political party from the PCTB decision. The PCTB itself explained away the controversy saying the published books did not obtain their no objection certificate.

== See also ==
- Bias in curricula
- Education in Pakistan
- NCERT textbook controversies
- Pakistan Studies curriculum
- Japanese textbook controversy
- Sectarian violence in Pakistan

== Bibliography ==
- MADRASA EDUCATION IN THE PAKISTANI CONTEXT: CHALLENGES, REFORMS AND FUTURE DIRECTIONS ~ Zahid Shahab Ahmed
- Nadia Agha, Ghazal Shaikh. Teachers' Perceptions of Gender Representation in Textbooks: Insights From Sindh, Pakistan. Journal of Education, Sage Journals. May 9, 2022. https://doi.org/10.1177/00220574221097596
