= Pakistan studies =

Academic discipline

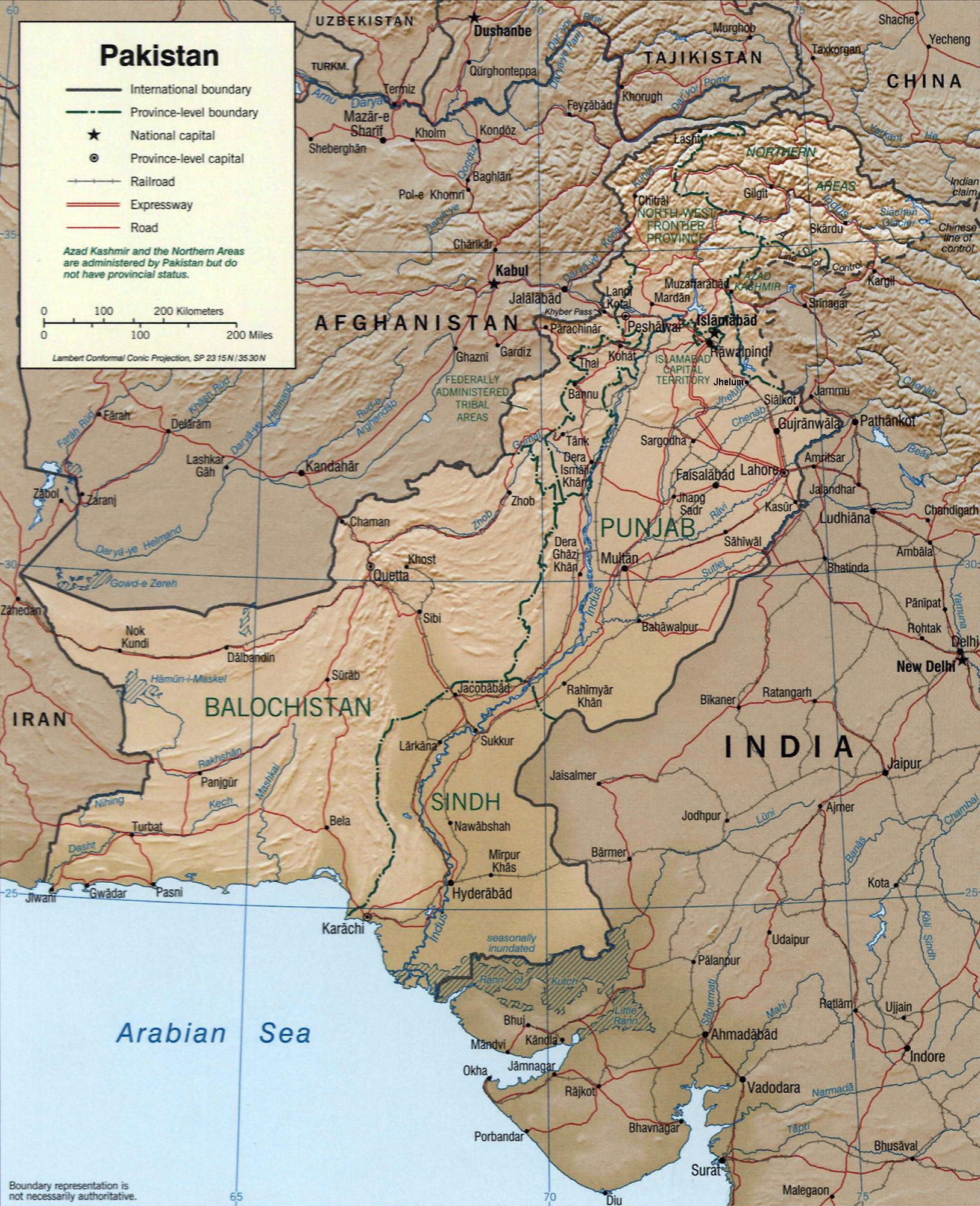
The map of Pakistan

Pakistan studies curriculum (Urdu: مطالعہ پاکستان Muṭāla-e-Pākistān) is the name of a curriculum of academic research and study that encompasses the culture, demographics, geography, history, International Relations and politics of Pakistan. The subject is widely researched in and outside the country, though outside Pakistan it is typically part of a broader Indology or some other wider field. Several universities in Pakistan have departments and research centers dedicated to the subject, whereas many independent research institutes carry out multidisciplinary research on Pakistan Studies. There are also a number of international organizations that are engaged in collaborative teaching, research, and exchange activities on the subject.

== International organizations ==
As the second largest South Asian country, and one of the major actors in the politics of the Muslim world, Pakistan is a focus of multidisciplinary studies. Various universities in the United States and the United Kingdom have research groups busy in academic and research related activities on Pakistan Studies. One such example is the American Institute of Pakistan Studies (AIPS) at the University of Wisconsin–Madison, established since 1973. An affiliate of the Association for Asian Studies, the institute regularly holds events such as seminars, public lectures, and conferences on various topics related to the Pakistan Studies. It also offers annual international fellowships for the research on materials relating to the history and culture of Pakistan.

In April 2004, AIPS organized an international workshop on the Salt Range Culture Zone of Pakistan at the University of Pennsylvania and the University of Wisconsin–Madison. The event provided the international audience with an opportunity to understand the archaeological and architectural heritage of the country.

Another academic initiative is the British Association for Pakistan Studies that was established in 1989. The forum has wider views on the topic than the common historiographical contexts, and encourages research and dialogue that involves both the academics and practitioners. The forum acknowledges that the topic has not received the sort of individual attention that the country and its society deserve, and therefore strives to increase international awareness on the subject.

There are also larger multinational and multicultural organizations that provide pluralist platforms for the discussions and debates on Pakistan Studies within the wider contexts of Asia. The Asia Foundation, for example, has launched specific projects for a diverse understanding of the subject through actions on local governance, civil society, human rights, and healthcare as well as political, economic, judicial, and foreign relations.

=== Curriculum ===
Pakistan Studies is one of the few heritage subjects for O-level and IGCSE qualifications governed by Cambridge International Examinations. The syllabus covers Pakistan's history, languages, national identity, geography, economy, and environment, as well as the challenges and opportunities faced by the country. It is also one of the compulsory subjects at O level to obtain equivalency from the Inter Board Coordination Commission. and hence all Pakistani O levels and IGCSE students (except those with foreign citizenship) have to study it.

== In Pakistan ==
In Pakistan, the subject is one of the four compulsory courses (along with the Urdu, English courses and Islamyat) at the Secondary School and Higher Secondary school levels of education. It is also taught as a degree course at most of the Social Science departments in many universities. There are also university departments dedicated to the education and research in Pakistan Studies.

Many of these departments provide degree programmes for in-depth studies, as well as research facilities for MPhil and PhD scholars. Courses broadly range from the history, politics and linguistics to the country's geography and economics, and from foreign affairs and religion studies to the social relations and literature. The focused attention on the subject at higher education levels means a wider scope for the research, thus making the subject an increasingly interdisciplinary one.

=== Curriculum issues ===
The variable political history of Pakistan shows the country being ruled alternately by the civilian and military leaderships. This lack of political succession has had its effects on the way the history was depicted in the curricula of Pakistan Studies until 2006, which increasingly portrayed what Rubina Saigol termed as 'glorification of military'. However, the occasional attempts to alter the historical texts did not escape criticisms from the academics and scholars in Pakistan and abroad. Historian Ayesha Jalal in her 1995 article also raised concerns over the trends of official historiography in Pakistan's history textbooks.

Yvette Rosser, in an article based on her PhD thesis, regards such curriculum as a composite of patriotic discourses. She identifies significant defects, inherent contradictions and inaccurate information within educational syllabus in general and the Pakistan Studies textbooks in particular. In 2003, Sustainable Development Policy Institute in Pakistan published a report that had emerged from a survey of text books of Urdu, English, Social Studies and Civics subjects being taught at the secondary and higher secondary school levels. The survey identified inaccuracies of fact and omissions that appeared to distort the significance of actual events in the country's history. Some of the prominent issues included the lack of understanding towards the civil society, religious diversity, and gender relations. The report recommended for major structural reforms and establishment of a National Education Advisory Board to centralise the curriculum development and carry out regular revisions.

About the international perception of the subject, Burzine Waghmar of the School of Oriental and African Studies argues that Pakistan Studies is increasingly perceived with sonorous sessions on weapons control, civil unrest, bonded labour, gender inequality and the like. These issues are considered among major hurdles to the wider international interest in the subject. Waghmar concludes that Pakistan and India, among other oriental societies, are plagued by visceral nationalism and post-imperial neurosis where state-sanctioned dogmas suppress eclectic historical readings.

According to the Sustainable Development Policy Institute report 'Associated with the insistence on the Ideology of Pakistan has been an essential component of hate against India and the Hindus. For the upholders of the Ideology of Pakistan, the existence of Pakistan is defined only in relation to Hindus, and hence the Hindus have to be painted as negatively as possible. A 2005 report by the National Commission for Justice and Peace a non profit organization in Pakistan, found that Pakistan Studies textbooks in Pakistan have been used to articulate the hatred that Pakistani policy-makers have attempted to inculcate towards the Hindus. 'Vituperative animosities legitimise military and autocratic rule, nurturing a siege mentality. Pakistan Studies textbooks are an active site to represent India as a hostile neighbour' the report stated. 'The story of Pakistan's past is intentionally written to be distinct from, and often in direct contrast with, interpretations of history found in India. From the government-issued textbooks, students are taught that Hindus are backward and superstitious.' Further the report stated 'Textbooks reflect intentional obfuscation. Today's students, citizens of Pakistan and its future leaders are the victims of these partial truths'.

An editorial in Pakistan's oldest newspaper Dawn, commenting on a report in The Guardian on Pakistani Textbooks, noted 'By propagating concepts such as jihad, the inferiority of non-Muslims, India's ingrained enmity with Pakistan, etc., the textbook board publications used by all government schools promote a mindset that is bigoted and obscurantist. Since there are more children studying in these schools than in madrassahs the damage done is greater. '

According to the historian Professor Mubarak Ali, textbook reform in Pakistan began with the introduction of Pakistan Studies and Islamic studies by Zulfiqar Ali Bhutto in 1971 into the national curriculum as compulsory subject. Former military dictator Gen Zia-ul-Haq under a general drive towards Islamization, started the process of historical revisionism in earnest and exploited this initiative. 'The Pakistani establishment taught their children right from the beginning that this state was built on the basis of religion – that's why they don't have tolerance for other religions and want to wipe-out all of them.'

According to Pervez Hoodbhoy, a physics professor at Quaid-i-Azam University in Islamabad, the Islamizing of Pakistan's schools began in 1976 when an act of parliament required all government and private schools (except those teaching the British O-levels from Grade 9) to follow a curriculum that includes learning outcomes for the federally approved Grade 5 social studies class such as: 'Acknowledge and identify forces that may be working against Pakistan,' 'Make speeches on Jihad,' 'Collect pictures of policemen, soldiers, and national guards,' and 'India's evil designs against Pakistan'. However, according to Rasul Baksh Rais, a political scientist, he has yet to see proof of anti-India or anti-Hindu bias.

Referring to NCERT's extensive review of textbooks in India in 2004, Verghese considered the erosion of plural and democratic values in textbooks in India, and the distortion of history in Pakistan to imply the need for coordination between Bangladeshi, Indian, and Pakistani historians to produce a composite history of the South Asia as a common reader.

However, international scholars also warn that any attempt for educational reforms under international pressure or market demands should not overlook the specific expectations of the people at local levels.

=== Curriculum reforms ===
Following the extensive media debate and academic reiteration on the need to update the curriculum at all levels of education, the Government of Pakistan carried out measures in 2006 to improve the national curriculum for Pakistan Studies. These actions were based on the earlier studies and recommendations by the former University Grants Commission in 2001 and then later by the Higher Education Commission of Pakistan (HEC) in 2003.

The new curriculum, for secondary and higher school certificates, was implemented from 2007 to include the political history from pre-independence to the modern times, international relations, evolution of the country's economy and demographics, diversity of regional cultures and languages, and the status of religious groups with specific reference to Muhammad Ali Jinnah's views that he expressed at his speech of 11 August 1947. It also eliminates prejudice against non-Muslims, efforts have been made to exclude all such material that promotes prejudice against the non-Muslims of pre-independence India.

Subsequently, the need was also realised to standardise the subject framework across the university degrees. As a result, in 2007, the Curriculum Division at the HEC revised the syllabus for the degrees of Bachelor of Science and Master of Science in Pakistan Studies. This revision enlarged the topics and incorporated the ideological underpinnings of Pakistan, the formulation of the Pakistani constitution, the society and culture, and contemporary issues. In 2013, another revision took place, and this time, more focus was given to constitutional history, governance, regional diversity, Pakistan's economy, and the position of the country in the international community. The new curriculum also sought to promote higher education institutions to think and learn creatively and based on research.The new higher education course outline goes beyond the literature, politics, history and culture, and addresses the contemporary challenges of urbanisation, foreign policy and environment. The recommendations also imply the needs for training the teachers to improve their communication skills in accordance with the new structures.

== See also ==
- List of books about Pakistan
- Sindhology
- Pakistani textbooks controversy
