= The Murder of History =

1985 book by Khursheed Kamal Aziz

The Murder of History: A Critique of History Textbooks Used in Pakistan
- Author: Khursheed Kamal Aziz
- Genre: Non-fiction
- Publication date: 1985
- Pages: 263

The Murder of History: A Critique of History Textbooks Used in Pakistan is a 1985 (263 page) book by Khursheed Kamal Aziz. It explains the various errors, misquotations, misinterpretations and misleading statements found in various curriculum textbooks taught in Pakistan. The first edition was published in 1985 under the banners of Vanguard books and the second edition came out in 1993.

== About the author ==
Khursheed Kamal Aziz, popularly known as KK Aziz, was a historian in Pakistan. He received his early education from the MB High School in Batala, now in Indian Punjab, and then went to Forman Christian College and finally to Government College Lahore for graduation where one of his professors was the famed Patras Bokhari. Later he completed his studies at Victoria University in Manchester, UK.

Aziz taught at various institutions such as the University of Cambridge and University of Oxford, UK, and at universities in Heidelberg, Germany as well as in Khartoum, Sudan and the Punjab University in Lahore, Pakistan. He also delivered occasional lectures at universities in Pakistan: Karachi, Peshawar, Islamabad; Bangladesh: Dacca; United Kingdom: Hull, New Castle upon Tyne and Oxford; Switzerland: Geneva and Bergen.

He worked briefly, in the early 1970s, as an advisor to Zulfikar Ali Bhutto and was the chairman of the 'National Commission on Historical and Cultural Research'. But he later fell out with the Bhutto government and left that position. Some years later, he returned his "Sitara-i-Imtiaz" medal awarded by the President of Pakistan, protesting his treatment by the martial law authorities after General Zia-ul-Haq seized power in 1977, and was forced to leave the country. He lived many years abroad as an exile and taught at many universities abroad. He began to collect his research material for his many famous books while he was teaching in Germany. His research material was enriched by the experiences he had while living in different countries.

== Events ==
In 1985, when the first edition of the book was published, it did not do well partially because of the regime of General Zia-ul-haq, of which he was a staunch critic. He was still staying with his brother-in-law in Lahore's Model Town neighborhood when in 1993 the second edition of The Murder of History was published. This time the book did relatively well. This started an intellectual trend in Pakistan and after that similar kinds of works started publishing because of the restoration of the normal political process in the country.

== Contents ==
The contents of the book are listed here:

- The Prescribed Myths
- The Calamity of Errors
- The Road to Ruin
- The Burden of Responsibility

== Description ==
First of all the author has quoted a long list of blunders that are printed in textbooks that are enforced as part of the national curriculum by the government of Pakistan. According to the writer, the textbooks are full of factual errors. In fact, they are just a collection of misquotations, misinterpretations, self-serving and self-supporting statements, one-sided viewpoints, slanted opinions, half-truths and blatant lies.

For example, the textbooks claim that the famous Lahore Resolution or Pakistan Resolution was passed on March 23, 1940 and on the basis of this, March 23 is called the Pakistan Day and is celebrated as a national holiday. The author proves that the resolution that was passed on March 24. Similarly, he says that Pakistan came into being on August 15, 1947, not on August 14, 1947. Furthermore, the author corrects the misinterpreted Allahabad Address of Iqbal. Various textbooks claim that in his address Iqbal demanded a 'separate independent Muslim state', on basis of this argument Iqbal is portrayed as the first person to demand a separate Muslim state in the Indian Subcontinent. The author proves that Iqbal didn't demanded an 'independent state' but merely demanded to unite the Muslim-majority areas of the Subcontinent. The author also argues against the textbooks' claim that the Mutiny of 1857 was a War Of Independence headed by Muslims. He states that the events of 1857 cannot be regarded as a war of independence, or a collective effort by Indian people against the Imperialism of Britain. Nor it was headed by Muslims.

He also claimed that he was real author of Ishtiaq Hussain Qureshi's book The Struggle for Pakistan. Mr. Qureshi indirectly accepted this fact in his preface to the book, he once said in the 1990s. "However, if were to write this book today, I would write differently."

== Aftermath ==
The third edition of Murder of History came out in 2010, and is now widely quoted by noted Pakistani and Western historians. Also, ever since his death, a series of books authored by Aziz have appeared. The history sections of book stores across Pakistan now carry a number of works authored by Aziz, something that was almost inconceivable even till the mid-1990s.
