= Fawzia Afzal-Khan =

English scholar

- Born: 1958 (age 67–68); Lahore, Pakistan
- Education: Kinnaird College for Women (B.A.); Tufts University (M.A., Ph.D.)
- Occupation: Professor
- Employer: Montclair State University
- Known for: Lahore with Love (memoir)
- Website: fawziaafzalkhan.webs.com

Fawzia Afzal-Khan (Urdu: فوزیہ افضل خان; born 1958 in Lahore, Pakistan) is a professor of English and director of the Women and Gender Studies Program at Montclair State University in New Jersey, United States. Afzal-Khan received her BA from Kinnaird College for Women, Lahore, Pakistan, and her MA and PhD in English Literature from Tufts University. A University Distinguished Professor, Afzal-Khan was awarded the "Excellence in Public Life Award" by the American Muslim Alliance in 2008. Afzal-Khan also serves on the editorial board of Pakistaniaat: A Journal of Pakistan Studies.

== Scholarly work ==
Author of three monographs and two edited volumes, Afzal-Khan has published extensively in academic journals as well as in newspapers and on public blogs on issues related to postcolonial studies, feminism, and political Islam.

== Memoir: Lahore with Love ==
Afzal-Khan's memoir, Lahore with Love: Growing up with Girlfriends Pakistani Style, was published in 2010 by Syracuse University Press. The memoir was immediately received as a fine contribution to the women's rights issues in Pakistan. The first edition contained commending blurbs from prominent authors and scholars: Nawal El Saadawi called it a "beautiful memoir which challenges stereotypes, universal fanatic fundamentalism and religious, political, and sexual taboos" and Henry Louis Gates Jr. found it to be a memoir that "weaves together memory and desire to create a tale that is marvelously compelling and endlessly entertaining, at once poignantly personal and richly political."

However, despite its positive reception, the book was soon dropped by Syracuse University Press due to the fear of a lawsuit from a prominent Pakistani woman who claimed that a character depicted in the book was based on her. The cancellation of the book by an academic press for fear of a lawsuit became an important issue in academic circles. Since the cancellation of the book, various academics, writers, and editors have supported Afzal-Khan in her right to free speech. In an editorial, Richard Schechner and Katherine Lieder of The Drama Review castigated the Syracuse University Press for not standing up for the rights of free speech of one of their own authors.

Afzal-Khan later published the memoir independently through the Amazon publishing platform. In 2011, Pakistaniaat: A Journal of Pakistan Studies published a special cluster of articles about the book, along with an interview with Afzal-Khan about the controversy. Pakistaniaat had previously published an interview with Fawzia in 2009, which was conducted by Nilanshu Kumar Agarwal.

== Bibliography ==
- Cultural Imperialism and the Indo-English Novel Genre and Ideology in R. K. Narayan, Anita Desai, Kamala Markandaya, and Salman Rushdie. University Park, Pennsylvania: Penn State University Press. 1993. ISBN 9780271009124.
- Afzal-Khan, Fawzia; Seshadri-Crooks, Kalpana (2000). The Pre-occupation of Postcolonial Studies. London, Durham: Duke University Press. ISBN 0822324865.
- Shattering the stereotypes : Muslim women speak out. Northampton, Massachusetts: Olive Branch Press. 2005. ISBN 1566565693.
- A critical stage: the role of secular alternative theatre in Pakistan. Calcutta: Seagull Books. 2005. ISBN 8170462754.
- Lahore with love: growing up with girlfriends, Pakistani-style. La Vergne, Tennessee: Insanity Ink Publications. 2010. ISBN 9781456462192.
- Pakistani creative writing in English. Johnstown, Pennsylvania: South Asian Literary Association. 2011.
- Siren Song: Understanding pakistan through its women singers. Pakistan: Oxford University Press. 2020. ISBN 978-0190700546.
