= Robin Truth Goodman =

American author (born 1966)

- Born: 1966 (age 59–60)
- Education: New York University (Ph.D)
- Occupation: Professor of English
- Employer: Florida State University

Robin Truth Goodman is a professor of Literature at Florida State University. Trained as a comparatist and as a scholar in postcolonial studies, Goodman specializes in the issues of critical pedagogy, feminism, and postcolonial theory. A cult following has been developing around her second book, Strange Love: Or How We Learn to Stop Worrying and Love the Market, which was one of the earliest titles on the cultures of neoliberalism. One of her books, World, Class, Women (Routledge, 2003) was considered a "pathbreaking book" that "examines how theory and literature can be used to reclaim feminism, schooling, and economic justice as part of a broader effort in imagining a global democratic public sphere" by Henry A. Giroux, a leading scholar of education. Her recent work also includes a book on Post-September 11 US policies and another acclaimed book, Feminist Theory in Pursuit of the Public, on the need for feminist theory to reclaim the public sphere. She is also the author of Gender Work: Feminism After Neoliberalism.

== Publications and scholarly activities ==
Author of six books, Goodman has also published extensively in academic journals and anthologies and also frequently shares her expertise through presentations at academic conferences and through public talks. Goodman is a member of the MLA Radical Caucus and is also on the editorial board of Pakistaniaat: A Journal of Pakistan Studies.
