= Siren Song (book) =

Siren Song: Understanding Pakistan Through its Women Singers
- Author: Fawzia Afzal-Khan
- Language: English
- Genre: Music history, social history, feminist history
- Publisher: Oxford University Press
- Publication date: August 25, 2020
- Publication place: England

Siren Song: Understanding Pakistan Through its Women Singers is a book by English scholar Fawzia Afzal-Khan. It explores the history of female singers in Pakistan through a lens of feminist theory. It was published by Oxford University Press on August 25, 2020.

== Overview ==
The book follows the history of Pakistan, beginning with the Partition of India in 1947. It is in the context of this history that the book explores the political and social significance of music and women's roles in Pakistani society.
