= Ballamabad =

Pakistani village

Coordinates: 31°43′18″N 73°09′14″E

Ballamabad, also known as Chak Seventeen, is a village in the Chiniot District of Punjab, Pakistan. It is located at 31°43'18N 73°9'14E with an altitude of 252 metres. The village is the birthplace of historian Khursheed Kamal Aziz.
