= Sustainable Development Policy Institute =

Institute in Pakistan

- Abbreviation: SDPI
- Formation: August 24, 1992
- Founded at: Islamabad, Pakistan
- Type: Policy research institution
- Location: 10-D West, Fazal-e-Haq Road, Blue Area, Islamabad, Pakistan
- Region served: South Asia
- Official language: English
- Affiliations: Government of Pakistan Commonwealth of Nations
- Website: https://sdpi.org/

The Sustainable Development Policy Institute (SDPI) is a non-profit research organization based in Islamabad, Pakistan. It was founded with the goal of promoting sustainable development in Pakistan and the wider South Asian region through research, policy analysis, and advocacy.

The institute conducts research on a wide range of issues related to sustainable development, including climate change, energy, water resources, agriculture, health, education, and poverty alleviation. It also provides technical assistance and advisory services to governments, NGOs, and other organizations working in these areas.

== History ==
Sustainable Development Policy Institute was founded in August 1992 on the recommendation of the Pakistan National Conservation Strategy (NCS), also known as Pakistan’s Agenda 21. The NCS placed Pakistan’s socio-economic development within the framework of a national environmental plan. This highly acclaimed document, approved by the Federal Cabinet in March 1992, outlined the necessity for an independent non-profit organization to serve as a source of expertise for policy analysis and development, policy intervention, and advisory services for policies and programs. SDPI is registered under the Societies Registration Act, XXI of 1860.
