= Masood Ashraf Raja =

Pakistani-American writer (born 1965)

- مسعود اشرف راجہ
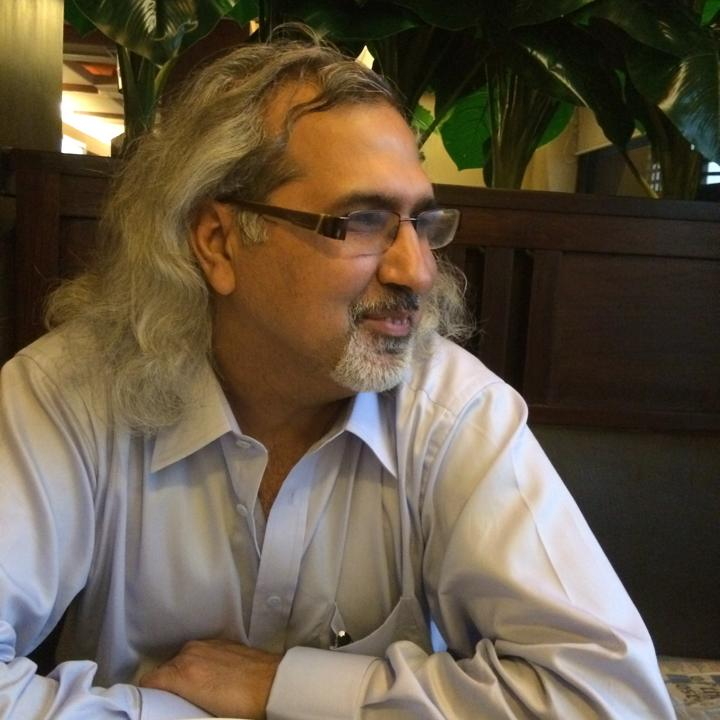
- Born: 1965 (age 60–61); Rawalpindi, Punjab, Pakistan
- Citizenship: Pakistani (1965-96); American (1996-present)
- Education: Master of Arts (Literature) and Doctor of Philosophy (Postcolonial Studies)
- Alma mater: Belmont University; Florida State University
- Occupation: Educator
- Employer: Linsly School
- Notable work: Democratic Criticism: Poetics of Incitement and the Muslim Sacred. (Lever Press, 2023)
- Spouse: Jenny Caneen-Raja
- Website: masoodraja.com

Masood Ashraf Raja (Urdu: مسعود اشرف راجہ) is a Pakistani-born American writer. Previously, he was an associate professor of postcolonial literature and theory at the University of North Texas. He is also the editor of Pakistaniaat: A Journal of Pakistan Studies, an open-access journal that he founded in 2009.

== Early life and education ==
Raja moved to the United States in 1996, after ten years of service in the Pakistan Army as an infantry officer.

He graduated with a master's in literature from Belmont University in 2002, where he was awarded the Graduate Writing Award, and at Florida State, where he received the Davis Award for Best Graduate Student and Davis Award for best dissertation in 2005 and 2006, respectively.

In 2006, Raja earned his PhD in postcolonial studies from Florida State University, where he studied with Robin Truth Goodman.

== Career ==
Besides teaching and writing about issues of postcoloniality, globalisation, and political Islam, Raja also actively participates in the public debates through his public writing on his two blogs as well as other popular and scholarly websites.

Raja's monograph, Constructing Pakistan (Oxford University Press, 2010), is an interesting explanation of the rise of Muslim national political identity during the British Raj and offers an innovative explanation of the genesis of the idea of Pakistan. Raja has published extensively in his area of study and on general academic topics in various academic journals and anthologies. Raja is a member of the Advisory Committee (2009–12) of PMLA, the premier journal of literature and languages and was elected to a five-year term on the Executive Committee of the South Asian Studies Group, Modern Language Association. Besides his academic and popular writings, Raja has actively presented his views at academic conferences as well as through public talks.

Raja has contributed his views on various issues related to the Islamic world and Pakistan to newspapers such as the Fort Worth Star-Telegram on a story on Osama bin Laden and to Aljazeera English on a story about the blasphemy law in Pakistan.

Having won a million dollar grant from the US State Department, Raja is the Director of a partnership program between the University of North Texas and the National University of Modern Languages in Islamabad.

Raja continues to contribute his thoughts on issues of social justice, political Islam, and issues of human rights.

He currently teaches at the Linsly School in Wheeling, West Virginia.

== Publications ==
Raja has published extensively on issues related to postcolonial studies, political Islam, and about Pakistan and the region. Besides his academic work, he also writes poetry and fiction.

Year	Title	Co-editors	Publisher
2010	Constructing Pakistan: Foundational Texts and the Rise of Muslim National Identity 1857-1947	-	Oxford University Press
2011	The Postnational Fantasy: Nationalism, Cosmopolitics and Science Fiction	Jason W. Ellis Swaralipi Nandi	McFarland & Company
2013	Critical Pedagogy and Global Literature: Worldly Teaching	Hillary Stringer Zach VandeZande	Palgrave Macmillan
2016	The Religious Right and the Talibanization of America	-	Palgrave Macmillan
2019	ISIS: Ideology, Symbolics, and Counter Narratives	-	Routledge
2023	Democratic Criticism: Poetics of Incitement and the Muslim Sacred	-	Lever Press
2023	The Routledge Companion to Literature and Social Justice	Nick T. C. Lu	Routledge
