= Inter Board Coordination Commission =

Pakistani governmental education body

Inter Board Coordination Commission (IBCC)
- Type: Federal Government Organization
- Legal status: Active
- Purpose: Accreditation, Equivalence, and Recognition of Examinations
- Region served: Pakistan
- Website: ibcc.edu.pk

Inter Board Coordination Commission (IBCC) is a federal government education body in Pakistan. It is responsible for the recognition of O and A Levels and the IB Diploma Programme in Pakistan and is authorized to recognize examinations and results of online home learning programs completed at the matriculation level as well as providing equivalence for further education.

== History ==
The Inter-Boards Committee of Chairman (IBCC) was reconstituted and reconstituted as the Inter-Boards Coordination Commission by an Act of Parliament. The legislation strengthened the IBCC to regulate foreign boards, certify and equate foreign and local qualifications for grades 9–12, and provide a platform for the exchange of ideas.

== Changes in examination system ==
For the year 2024, the Federal Board of Intermediate and Secondary Education has announced major changes in matriculation and inter-practical examinations. A nationwide committee of chairmen of education boards decided to replace the existing grading system at the Matric (Grade X) and Inter (Grade XII) levels with a 10-point system across the country.

Grade	Description	Percentage Range
A++	Exceptional	95-100%
A+	Outstanding	90-95%
A	Remarkable	85-90%
B++	Excellent	80-85%
B+	Very Good	75-80%
B	Good	70-75%
C	Fair	60-70%
D	Satisfactory	50-60%
E	Sufficient	40-50%

== Online attestation and equivalence certification ==
In 2023, IBCC, as part of its comprehensive reform agenda, moved its entire system of authentication and equivalency certification online using QR code-based technology. This online system allows students to pursue their education through online schooling programs up to Secondary School Certificate (SSC) or Matriculation.

== See also ==
- List of boards of intermediate and secondary education in Pakistan
