= Mubarak Ali =

Pakistani historian

- مُبارَک علی
- Born: 21 April 1941 (age 85); Tonk, Tonk State, British India
- Occupations: Historian, activist and scholar
- Known for: Wrote over 60 books on history of Pakistan; Writes his history books from a common man's perspective and not the ruling class

Mubarak Ali (Urdu: مُبارَک علی; born 21 April 1941) is a Pakistani historian, activist and scholar. His main theme, in most of his books, has been that some history books written in Pakistan had been 'dictated' by the ruling class (the so-called 'Establishment in Pakistan') and, in his view, those history books represent 'perversion of facts'. A Marxist, Mubarak Ali maintains that history books should be written from the perspective of masses, not of rulers.

== Early life and career ==
Mubarak Ali was born in Tonk, in the erstwhile princely state of Tonk, British India (present-day Rajasthan, India) on 21 April 1941. Mubarak Ali and his family migrated to Pakistan in 1952 and settled in Hyderabad, Sindh. Mubarak Ali received a M.A. degree in history with first class first position from Sindh University, Jamshoro in 1962. He was appointed as a lecturer in the Department of History at Sindh University Jamshoro in 1963. In 1972, he went to London, then Germany to pursue higher studies and in 1976, he attained a PhD degree (on the Mughal Period of India) at Ruhr University, Bochum, Germany. He later became head of the History Department at the University of Sindh. He was the Director of the Goethe Institute in Lahore until 1996. In 2005, he was the editor of the quarterly journal Taarikh (History) and has been widely interviewed by electronic and print media in India, Pakistan and the Middle East.

In 1999, while speaking at a seminar in Mumbai organised by the NGO Khoj, Mubarak Ali referred to fundamentalism's effects on historical scholarship in his country. He described how after the Indo-Pakistani War of 1965, ancient history was de-emphasized in Pakistan by some historians. The official government rule stated that anything outside of the syllabus "is not part of our history". He further stated that the official historiography in Pakistan is committed to the two-nation theory in the Indian subcontinent. In other words, Hindus and Muslims in pre-1947 era British India essentially were 2 different and distinct nations and, therefore, the British needed to divide old India into 2 different countries, based on this fact, before they ended their colonial rule in British India. This was called the Pakistan Movement and it succeeded in its effort with the support of the majority of the Indian Muslims under the leadership of Muhammad Ali Jinnah and an independent Pakistan was created in 1947. Although later, after the independence of Pakistan in 1947, many history book writers ignored the Pakistan public's need for the truth and keeping a balanced view of history when writing their history books. Instead, some historians went to the other extreme and started to confuse the Pakistani public about whether Pakistan's known history begins from the 5000 years old Indus Valley civilization or from the Arab Muslims (Muhammad bin Qasim (31 Dec 695 – 18 July 715)) and his attack on Sindh in 712 A.D. or from the Independence of Pakistan in 1947.

Speaking at the "National Seminar on Rani Kot", a historic location and fort in Sindh, he called for the reading and writing of history from a different angle, in which invaders of old and ancient India should not always be acclaimed as "great". He said that archaeological sites do have their own significance, referring to the discovery of Mohenjo-daro which reflected a great civilization of the region. This discovery played a dominant role in the independence movement of the subcontinent, because until its discovery, people of this part of the world were not considered literate or civilised.

He has written a number of books and articles on Ind-Pakistani history, and has been widely acclaimed as an anti-establishment and anti-government thinker and historian. He stated in an interview that "No authentic history has yet been written about Pakistan and its independence. There is a lot of confusion among the so-called pro-Establishment historians and educationists. Whatever has been written so far is distortion of history and entirely unbalanced."

Mubarak Ali has called for the rewriting of the subcontinent's history and correction of what he called "historical aberrations", so that the hatred and misunderstanding prevailing between the people of India and Pakistan could come to an end. He said textbooks in the two countries had been systematically distorted and that the time has come to reverse the trend.

Mubarak Ali has said that "any system based on oppression, coercion and authoritarianism [is] the first problem in the way of writing history". Pakistan's history has been dictated, he said, by politics and the personal ideologies of autocratic rulers and military dictators. He also reiterated his call for "history to be analyzed and rewritten from the perspective of the masses instead of the viewpoint of rulers."

In 2005, Mubarak Ali claimed that the police was harassing him and investigating him to "verify his learning", and that he was considering leaving Pakistan forever. Four police First Information Reports (FIRs) were lodged against him in Lahore.

In 2007, Mubarak Ali published three books: Qadeem Hindustan ("Ancient India"), Ahd-e-Wusta Ka Hindustan ("India of the Middle Ages") and Bartanvi Hindustan ("British India"), published jointly by the NGO ActionAid and the Fiction House. These books were targeted towards younger readers. Speaking at the launch, Ali stated that some of the Pakistani curricula did not contain any citation about Ashoka the Great, whose reign witnessed peace and religious harmony. According to Ali, "it was the British who destroyed the harmony and sowed the seeds of hatred among Hindus and Muslims as the Mughals' policy of religious harmony continued to be applied during their ruling period (1526-1857) despite all sorts of hiccups".

According to Mubarak Ali, the textbook reform in Pakistan began with the introduction of Pakistan Studies and Islamic studies by Zulfiqar Ali Bhutto in 1971, which became a compulsory subject in the national curriculum. In the 1980s, former military dictator Muhammad Zia-ul-Haq, as part of a general drive towards Islamization, started the process of historical revisionism and exploited this initiative. "The Pakistani establishment taught their children right from the beginning that this state was built on the basis of religion – that's why they do not have tolerance for other religions and want to wipe out all of them."

Speaking at the Human Rights Commission of Pakistan office in May 2009, Mubarak Ali said, "democracy in Pakistan had an imprint of martial laws and what we were witnessing today could at best be described as 'feudal democracy'. It is the third generation of feudals who are ruling Pakistan". Although Muttahida Majlis-e-Amal (MMA) lost the elections, Ali argued that religiosity had grown in Pakistan to such an extent that "every political party in the National Assembly is an MMA and it is the assembly that approved Nizam-e-Adl regulation."

His 2009 comprehensive book in Urdu, Taareekh Ki Daryafat, is considered to be his most concise work. The first part of the book deals with heroism and society, historiography in the 20th century, how we should write history and his autobiography, while the second part covers a large number of topics. These interpretations highlight national controversies, for example about Mughal Muslims in India, the relationship between the Ottomans and the Mughals, religion and its political use, Islamic scholars and modernism, French revolution, Indus Civilization, imperialism and fundamentalism, history of coil and coffee, honor killings in Pakistan, forgetful men and the latest trends in historiography.

== Reputation as a historian ==
In May 2007, at an event launching three books of Mubarak Ali in Karachi, Pakistan, Jaffer Ahmed, Director of the Pakistan Studies Centre of the University of Karachi reportedly said about Mubarak Ali, "He diverted the focus of history from the kings to the people, culture, traditions, chores, customs, education and health facilities and made people realise how vast the scope of history can be." This event was organized by Pakistan Academy of Letters.

== Works ==
According to a major newspaper of Pakistan, "Mubarak Ali writes of and for ordinary people and not for the kings." Mubarak Ali "tries to take truth out of all the evidence, available archives and archaeological facts."

- Taareekh ki Daryafat, Dost Publications-wordmate, Islamabad, 2009
- Qadeem Hindustan (Ancient India), 2007
- Ahd-i-Wusta ka Hindustan (India of the Middle Ages), 2007
- Bartanvi Hindustan (British India), 2007
- Mulhid Ka Overcoat, Fiction House, Lahore, 3rd Ed. 2013
- In the Shadow of History, Nigarshat, Lahore
- History on Trial, Fiction House, Lahore, 1999
- Tareekh Aur Nisabi Kutub, Fiction House, Lahore, 2013
- Shaahi Mahal (Royal Palace), Fiction House, Lahore, 1992
- Taarikh kee Roshnee (Light of History), Fiction House, Lahore, 4th Edition 2012
- Aakhri Ehad Mugliah kaa Hindostaan (India in Last Mughal Rule), Fiction House, Lahore, 7th Edition 2012
- Gumshudah Taareekh (Lost History) Fiction House, Lahore, 2012
- Taareekh aur Daanishver (History and Intlectual), Fiction House, Lahore, 2012
- Taareekh aur Siyaasat (History and Politics), Fiction House, Lahore, 5th Edition 2012
- Taareekh aur Aaj Kee Duniyaa (History and Today's world, Fiction House, Lahore, 2012
- Dar Dar Thokar Khaaey, Autobiography, Fiction House, 18-Muzang, Lahore, 6th Edition 2012
- Taareekh, Thug aur Daacu (History, Thug and Bandit), Fiction House, Lahore, 2013
- Bartaanvi Raaj (British Era), Fiction House, Lahore, 3rd Edition 2012
- Gulaami aur Nasel Parasti (Slavery and Racism), Fiction House, Lahore, 2013
- Taarikh aur Falsfa-e-Taarikh (History and Philosophy of History, Fiction House, Lahore, 4th Edition 2005
- Mughal Darbaaar (Mughal Court), Fiction House, Lahore, 2004
- Achoot Logoun Kaa Adab (Literature of Untouchables) Co-written by Razi Abdi, Fiction House, Lahore, 1994
- Bar-e Sagheer Mein Mulsmaan Muashrey kaa Almeya, Fiction House, Lahore, 7th Edition 2012
- Niji Zindgi Ki Tarrekh (History of Private Life), Fiction House, Lahore 2012
- Traikh Shinaasi, Fiction House, Lahore 2012
- Tarikh Kay Badaltey Nazriaat, Fiction House, Lahore 2012
- Tarikh aur Mazhabi Tehreekein, Fiction House, Lahore 2013
- Akbar kaa Hindostan, translated by Dr. Mubarak Ali 2012
- Europe kaa Arooj (Rise of Europe), Fiction House, Lahore 2012
- Jadeed Taarikh (Modern History), Fiction House, Lahore
- Taarikh aur Tehqeeq (History and Research), Fiction House, Lahore
- Pather kaa Zamaanah (Stone Age), Fiction House, Lahore
- Kaansi Kaa Zammanah (Bronze Age), Fiction House, Lahore
- Lohey Kaa Zamanah (Iron Age), Fiction House, Lahore
- Tarikh or Aurat, Fiction House
- Pakistani Moashra, Fiction House
- Badalti Hui Tarikh, Fiction House
- Tarikh or Tehqeeq, Fiction House
- Sindh ki Tarikh Kia Hey, Fiction House
- Tarikh Shanasi, Fiction House
- Ulma or Siasat, Fiction House
- Quaid e Azam Kia Thay Kia Nahi Thay, Fiction house
- Sindh Ki Awaz, Fiction House
- Sindh Khamoshi Ki Awaz, Fiction house
- Sindh ki Samaji or Saqafti Tareekh, Fiction house
- Interviews or Tasuraat, Fiction House
- Lutfullah ki aab-biti, Fiction House
- Tarikh— 'Khana or Khaney Key Aadaab' , Fiction House
- Pakistan mein Marshal Law Ki Tareekh, Fiction House Ed.2014
- Tahzeeb ki Kahani, Fiction House
- Hindustaan ki Tareekh, Fiction House
- Tareekh Ki Wapsi, Fiction House Ed.2014
- Nationalism kya Hey??, Fiction House Ed.2014
- Tareekh or Awam, Fiction House Ed.2014
- Tareekh ki gawahi Edition 2015
- Tareekh Fehmi, Edition 2015
- Tareekh ki Talash, Fiction House 2003

(All books are available at Fiction House, Urdu Bazar, Karachi and Lahore, Pakistan)

== Awards and recognition ==
- Faiz Ahmed Faiz Award – 1989
- Hassam-ud-Din Rashidi Gold Medal Award by Sindh Graduate Association – 2002
- Khwaja Ahmad Abbas International Award by Pakistan Academy of Letters – 2018

== See also ==
- Nabi Bakhsh Khan Baloch (N. A. Baloch)
- Ayesha Jalal
- Ishtiaq Hussain Qureshi
- Khursheed Kamal Aziz (K. K. Aziz)
