= Pakistaniaat =

- Discipline: Area studies
- Language: English
- Edited by: Masood Ashraf Raja

Publication details
- History: 2009-present
- Publisher: University of North Texas (United States)
- Frequency: Triannually
- Open access: Yes
- License: Creative Commons: Attribution-NC-Share Alike

Standard abbreviations
- ISO 4: Pakistaniaat

Indexing
- ISSN: 1948-6529 (print); 1946-5343 (web)

Links
- Journal homepage; Online archive

Pakistaniaat: A Journal of Pakistan Studies (Urdu: پاکستانیات) is a peer-reviewed open access academic journal established in 2009, which covers research on Pakistan studies. It is published triannually by the English Department of the University of North Texas and is also sponsored by the American Institute of Pakistan Studies. Pakistaniaat occasionally publishes special issues, for example on the Indo-Pakistani War of 1971.

== Abstracting and indexing ==
A member of The Council of Editors of Learned Journals, Pakistaniaat is indexed in LivRe!, the MLA International Bibliography, and Ulrich's Periodicals Directory.
