= Khursheed Kamal Aziz =

Pakistani historian (1927-2009)

K. K. Aziz
- کے کے عزِیز
- Born: Khursheed Kamal Aziz; 11 December 1927; Ballamabad, Chiniot District, Punjab, British India
- Died: 15 July 2009 (aged 81); Lahore, Pakistan
- Occupations: Historian, professor
- Spouse(s): Zarina Aziz (22 June, 1933 - 6 July, 2012) Lahore

Khursheed Kamal Aziz Urdu pronunciation: [xʊɾˈʃiːd̪ kəmaːl ˈəziːz] (Urdu: خُورشِید کمال عزِیز; 1927–2009) better known as K. K. Aziz, was a Pakistani historian, admired for his books written in the English language. However, he also wrote Urdu prose and was a staunch believer in the importance of the Persian language to enhance one's knowledge about the world.

== Early life and career ==
Khursheed Kamal Aziz was born on 11 December 1927 to Abdul Aziz, a barrister and historian. He belonged to the Kakazai tribe. He was born in a town called Ballamabad, Chiniot District, Punjab, British India. He received his early education from M.B. High School in Batala, Punjab and then went to first Forman Christian College and finally to Government College Lahore for further studies where one of his professors was the famed Patras Bokhari. Later he completed his studies at Victoria University in Manchester, UK.

Aziz taught at various reputed institutions such as the University of Cambridge and University of Oxford, UK, and at universities in Heidelberg, Germany as well as in Khartoum, Sudan and the Punjab University in Lahore, Pakistan. He also delivered occasional lectures at universities in Pakistan: Karachi, Peshawar, Islamabad; Bangladesh: Dacca; United Kingdom: Hull, New Castle upon Tyne and Oxford; Switzerland: Geneva and Bergen.

He worked briefly, in the early 1970s, as an advisor to Zulfikar Ali Bhutto and was the chairman of the 'National Commission on Historical and Cultural Research' but he later fell out with Zulfiqar Ali Bhutto and his regime and left that position. Some years later, he returned his "Sitara-i-Imtiaz" Award awarded by the President of Pakistan in protest of his treatment by the Martial Law authorities after General Zia-ul-Haq took over power in 1977 and was forced to leave the country. He lived many years abroad as an exile and taught at many universities abroad. He began to collect his research material for his many famous books while he was teaching in Germany. His research material was enriched by the experiences he had while living in many different countries abroad.

== Death and legacy ==
He died in Lahore, Pakistan at the age of 81, on 15 July 2009. K. K. Aziz had returned from abroad to Lahore, Pakistan only in 2008, a year before his death. His wife, Zarina Aziz, said in an interview to a Pakistani newspaper, after his death, that he had been somewhat sick for about last 5 years but had continued to work for 10 hours daily to write and finish his books. He had written over 50 history books in his lifetime and used to say to her that his books were his children and would keep his name alive. In 2014, per a major Pakistani newspaper columnist, some young Pakistanis are starting to give K. K. Aziz credit for helping them have a balanced view of Pakistan's history. Now, at least, they got a chance to look at the history of Pakistan from a point of view other than the 'only slanted view laced with extreme ideological narratives' in the text books they studied at school and college. Pakistani people themselves and also the world at large, have the ability to sort out the truth, on individual basis, after reading many and different points of view on the history of Pakistan. Since the mid 1990s, some historians and intellectuals in Pakistan have slowly and surely tried to develop a more rational and balanced view of Pakistani history.

== Literary works ==
Aziz had a profound love for words and writing. He authored 44 valuable books on the modern history of the Muslims of the Indian subcontinent. He had a unique style of writing that stimulated readers' thought process. He wrote on many significant issues related to Pakistan and also came up with volumes of significant details on important dignitaries who helped in shaping the history of the Indian subcontinent.

== Bibliography ==
Some of his books include:

- History of the Partition of India
- The Meaning of Islamic Art
- Public Life in Muslim India
- The Murder of History : A Critique of History Textbooks used in Pakistan (one of his famous works)- first edition in 1985, second edition in 1993
- The Making of Pakistan: A Study in Nationalism
- Studies in History and Politics
- Party Politics in Pakistan (1947–1958)
- Britain and Pakistan
- Muslims Under Congress Rule (1937–1939) - A documentary record
- British Imperialism in India
- Woh Hawadis Ashna
- The Partition of India and Emergence of Pakistan
- The Pakistani Historian (his autobiography)
- Rahmat Ali: A Biography
- British Imperialism in India
- Punjab: A Historical Miscellany
- The All India Muslim Conference (1928–1935): A Documentary Record
- Religion, Land and Politics in Pakistan: A Study of Piri-Muridi.
- Public Life in Muslim India (1850–1947) A Compendium of Basic Information on Political, Social, Religious, and Educational Organizations Active in Pre-Partition India.
- World Powers and the 1971 Breakup of Pakistan
- The Coffee House of Lahore: A Memoir (1942 – 57)
- A Journey into the Past: Portrait of a Punjabi Family (1800 - 1970)
- The Indian Khilafat Movement

== Works on K. K. Aziz ==
"Evaluation of Historical Works of K. K. Aziz with Special Focus on Muslim Nationalism in the Subcontinent" is the Ph.D. thesis work on K. K. Aziz by Jamil Ahmad Khan, Islamia University Bahawalpur, 2022. HEC (PCD) # 31874

"K.K. Aziz's Historiography: A Review on "The Making of Pakistan" in Perspective of Nationalist Muslims and Muslim Nationalism" is a published article in the journal Pakistan Social Sciences Review (PSSR) [https://doi.org/10.35484/pssr.2020(4-I)74]

See also the work by Jamil Ahmad Khan

"Mir Jaffar Khan Jamali: A Political Biography (1930-1967)" is the M.Phil. thesis work on Mir Jaffar Khan Jamali in Islamia University Bahawalpur, Session 2012-2015 by Jamil Ahmad Khan. [https://docslib.org/doc/6631943/mir-jaffar-khan-jamali-a-political-biography-1930-196]

== See also ==
Some other major historians of Pakistan:

- Nabi Bakhsh Khan Baloch
- Mubarak Ali
- Ishtiaq Hussain Qureshi
- Hasan Askari Rizvi
- Rasul Baksh Rais
- Ayesha Siddiqa
- Sulaiman Nadvi
- Mahmud Hussain
- Ayesha Jalal
- Tariq Rahman
