= Dinia =

Dinia may refer to:

- Dinia (moth), a genus of moth
- Dinia, a name created by Pakistani nationalist Choudhary Rahmat Ali as an alternative to India
- Dinia, a Roman town, now Digne-les-Bains, France
