= Pakistan Movement =

Muslim nationalist movement in South Asia (1940–1947)

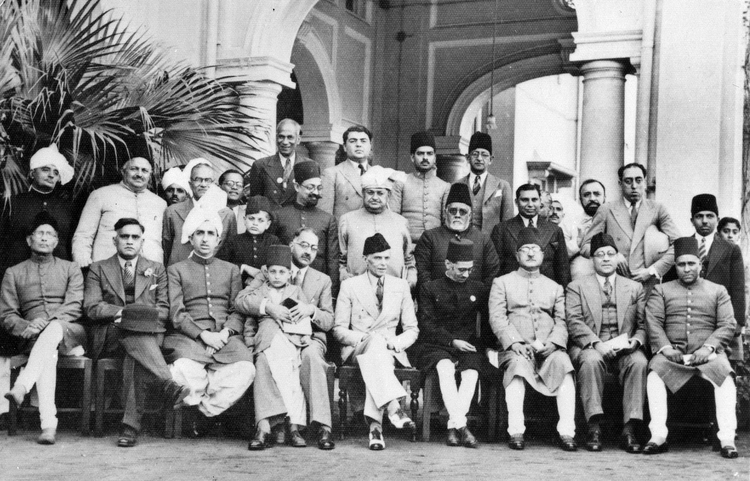
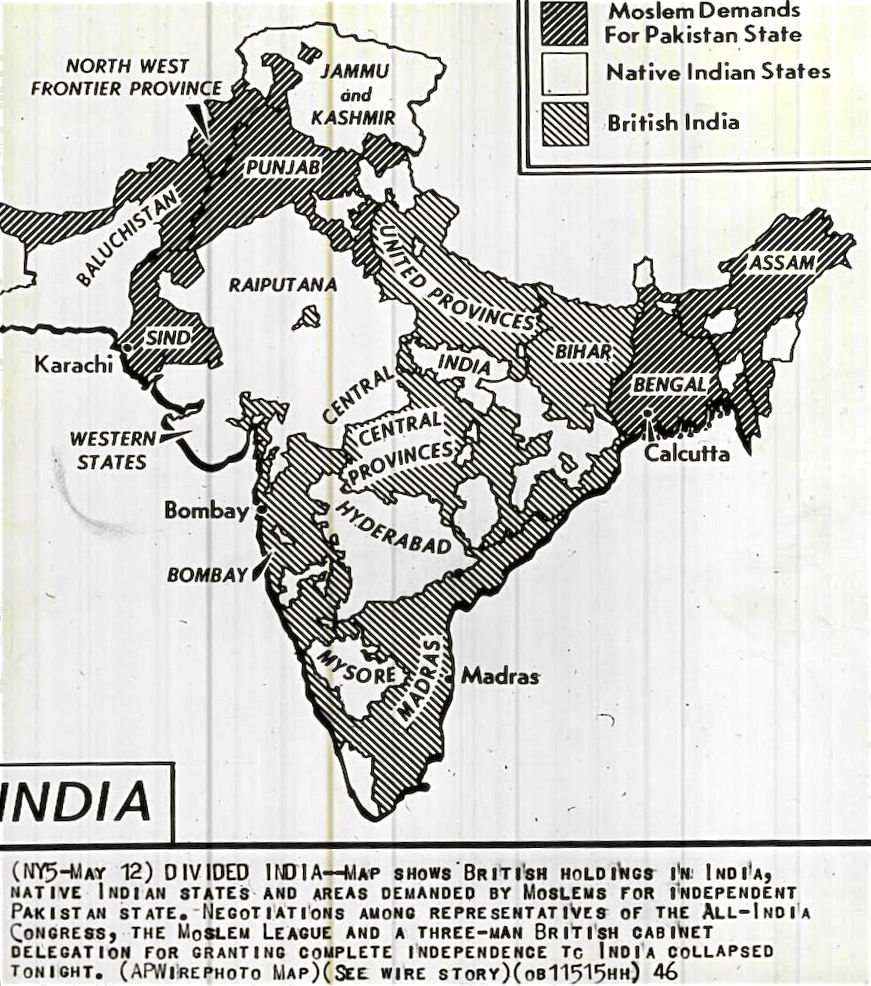
- Top to bottom: Muslim League leaders at a dinner party in 1940 during its three-day general session in which the Lahore Resolution, the formal political statement which advocated for the creation of Pakistan, was passed. Muhammad Ali Jinnah, the widely recognised father of Pakistan, is seen seated in the fifth seat from the left. 1946 map by Columbia University depicting British India and the dark-shaded provinces of Punjab, Sind, Baluchistan, the Northwest Frontier Province, Bengal, and Assam, which were demanded by the Muslim League to be a part of a sovereign Pakistan.
- Date: 23 March 1940 – 14 August 1947
- Location: British Raj
- Caused by: Anti-colonialism; socioeconomic inequality
- Methods: Nonviolence; nonviolent resistance; civil disobedience
- Result: Partition of India; Creation of Pakistan in 1947

The Pakistan Movement (Note: Urdu: تحریک پاکستان, romanized: Tehrīk-e-Pākistān Punjabi: پاکستان تحریک, romanized: Pākastān tæhrīk Pashto: د پاکستان تحریک, romanized: Dà Pākistān tahrīk Sindhi: پاڪستان تحريڪ, romanized: Pākastān tahrīk Balochi: پاکستان تحریک, romanized: Pákastán tahrīk) was a Muslim nationalist political and social movement, emerging in the early 20th century, that advocated the formation of Pakistan as a separate Muslim homeland in the Muslim-majority parts of what was then the British Indian Empire. It was rooted in the two-nation theory, which asserted that Muslims were fundamentally and irreconcilably distinct from Hindus (who formed the demographic majority) and would therefore require separate self-determination upon decolonisation. The idea was largely realised when the All-India Muslim League ratified the Lahore Resolution on 23 March 1940, calling for the Muslim-majority regions of the South Asia to be "grouped to constitute independent states" that would be "autonomous and sovereign" with the aim of securing Muslim socio-political interests vis-à-vis the Hindu majority. It was in the aftermath of the Lahore Resolution under the aegis of Muhammad Ali Jinnah, that the cause of "Pakistan" (though the name was not used in the text itself) became widely popular among the Muslims of South Asia.

Instrumental in establishing a base for the Pakistan Movement was the Aligarh Movement, which consisted of several reforms by Sir Syed Ahmed Khan that ultimately promoted a system of Western-style scientific education among Indian Muslims, seeking to enrich and vitalise their society, culture, and religious thought as well as protect it. Khan's efforts fostered Indian Muslim nationalism and went on to provide both the Pakistan Movement and later the country that it would yield with its leadership.

Several prominent Urdu poets, such as Muhammad Iqbal, used speech, literature, and poetry as a powerful tool for Muslim political awareness; Iqbal is often called the spiritual father of Muslim nationalist thought in his era. The role of British India's ulama, however, was divided into two groups: the first group, denoted by the ideals of Hussain Ahmad Madani, was convinced by the concept of composite nationalism, which argued against religious nationalism on the basis of India's historic identity as a nation of ethnic, cultural, linguistic, and religious diversity; while the second group, denoted by the ideals of Ashraf Ali Thanwi, was a proponent of the perceived uniqueness of the Muslim way of life and accordingly played a significant role in the Pakistan Movement. Likewise, a number of Muslim political parties were split over their support, or lack thereof, for an independent Muslim state. Among the most prominent of these parties was Jamiat Ulema-e-Hind, which was Opposition to the partition of India, and from which a pro-separatist group of Islamic scholars, led by Shabbir Ahmad Usmani, founded the breakaway Jamiat Ulema-e-Islam to support the Pakistan Movement.

The ultimate objective of the Pakistan Movement, led by the All-India Muslim League, was achieved with the partition of British India on 14 August 1947, when the Radcliffe Line officially demarcated the Dominion of Pakistan over two non-contiguous swaths of territory, which would later be organised as East Pakistan and West Pakistan, with the former comprising East Bengal and the latter comprising Baluchistan, the North-West Frontier, Sind, West Punjab, and various princely states (Note: Azad Kashmir and Northern Areas (now called Gilgit-Baltistan) were not integrated into the province of West Pakistan, and were ruled separately by the federal government) and inheriting British India's borders with Afghanistan and Iran. In 1971, however, the Bangladesh Liberation War resulted in the dissolution of East Pakistan, which seceded from West Pakistan to become present-day Bangladesh.

== History of the movement ==
=== Background ===
During the early 19th century, Lord Macaulay's radical and influential educational reforms led to numerous changes to the introduction and teaching of Western languages (e.g. English and Latin), history, and philosophy. Religious studies and the Arabic, Turkish, and Persian languages were completely barred from the state universities. In a short span of time, the English language had become not only the medium of instruction but also the official language in 1835 in place of Persian, disadvantaging those who had built their careers around the latter language. Traditional Hindu and Islamic studies were no longer supported by the British Crown, and nearly all of the madrasahs lost their waqf (lit. 'financial endowment').

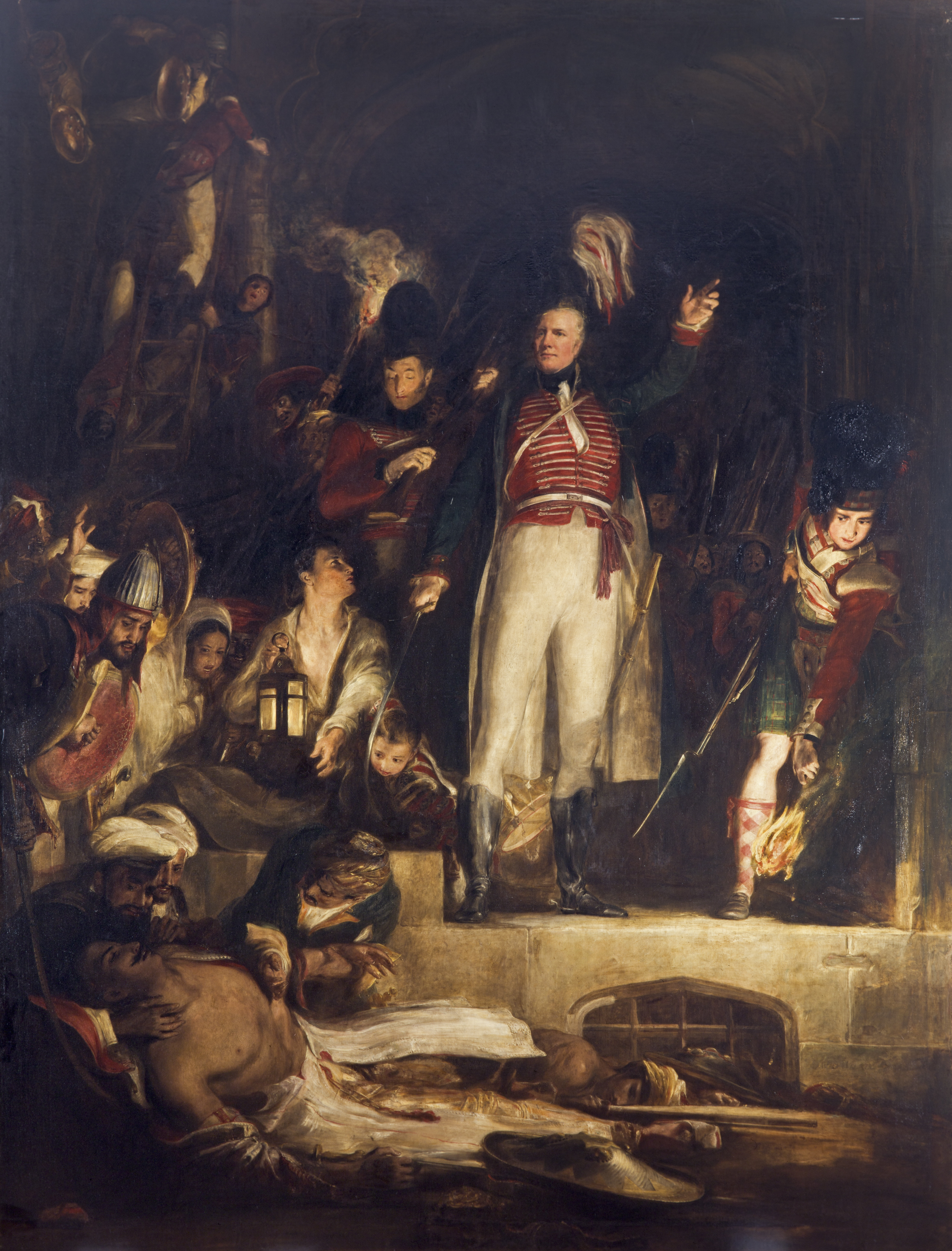
Sir David Baird discovering the body of Tipu Sultan

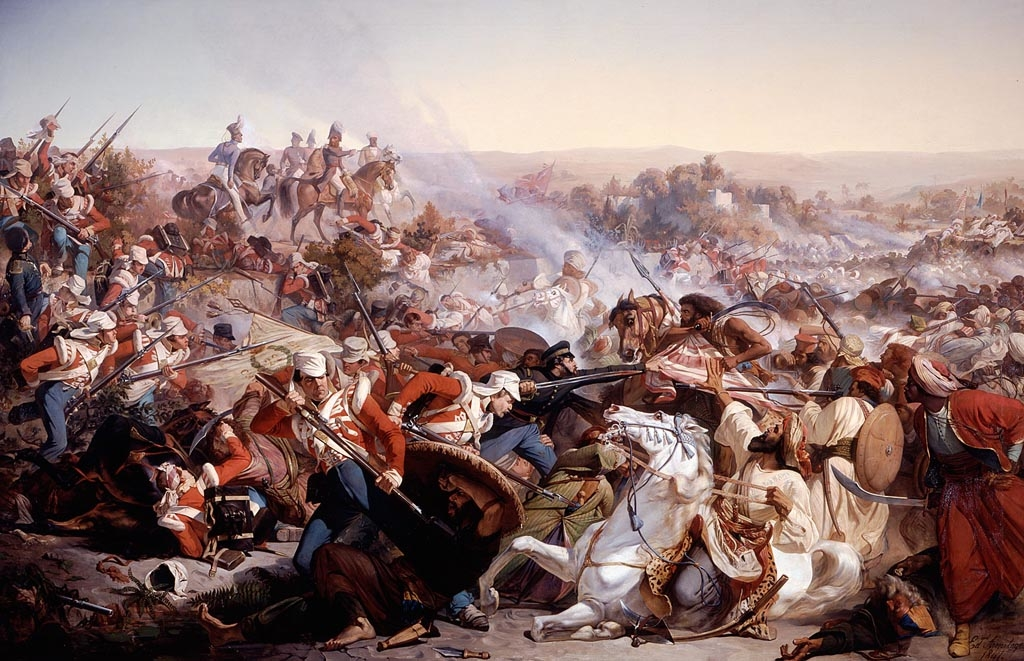
The Battle of Miani during the conquest of Sindh

=== Renaissance vision ===
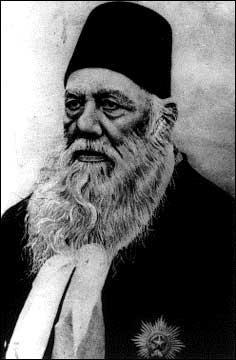
Sir Syed Ahmad Khan became an inspiration for the Pakistan Movement.

Very few Muslim families had their children sent to English universities. On the other hand, the effects of the Bengali Renaissance made the Hindu population more educated and enabled them to gain lucrative positions at the Indian Civil Service; many ascended to the influential posts in the British government. In 1930, Muhammad Iqbal delivered his famous speech in the Allahabad annual session which is commonly regarded as sowing the seeds for the creation of a separate state, later known as Pakistan.

Class conflict was coloured in a religious shade, as the Muslims were generally agriculturists and soldiers, while Hindus were increasingly seen as successful financiers and businessmen. Therefore, according to the historian Spear, "an industrialised India meant a Hindu India" to the Muslims. Syed Ahmed Khan converted the existing cultural and religious entity among Indian Muslims into a separatist political force, throwing a Western cloak of nationalism over the Islamic concept of culture. The distinct sense of value, culture and tradition among Indian Muslims originated from the nature of Islamisation of the Indian populace during the Muslim conquests in the Indian subcontinent.

=== Rise of organised movement ===
The success of the All India Muhammadan Educational Conference as a part of the Aligarh Movement, the All-India Muslim League, was established with the support provided by Syed Ahmad Khan in 1906. It was founded in Dhaka in a response to the reintegration of Bengal after a mass Hindu protest took place in the subcontinent. Earlier in 1905, viceroy Lord Curzon partitioned Bengal, which was favoured by the Muslims, since it gave them a Muslim majority in the eastern half.

In 1909 Lord Minto promulgated the Council Act and met with a Muslim delegation led by Aga Khan III, a deal to which Minto agreed. The delegation consisted of 35 members, who each represented their respective region proportionately, mentioned hereunder.

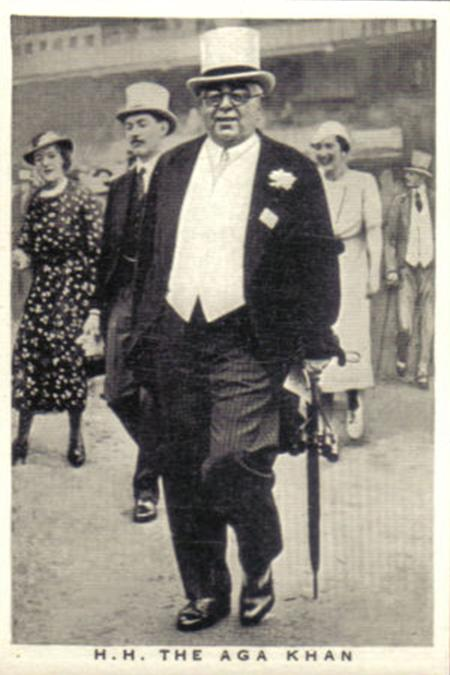
Aga Khan III in 1936.

Nawab Mohsin ul Mulk, (left) who organised the Simla deputation, with Sir Syed Ahmed Khan (centre), Sir Syed's son Justice Syed Mahmood (right). Syed Mahmood was the first Muslim to serve as a High Court judge in the British Raj.

1. Sir Aga Khan III (Head of the delegation); (Bombay).
2. Nawab Mohsin-ul-Mulk (Aligarh).
3. Nawab Waqar-ul-Mulk (Muradabad).
4. Maulvi Hafiz Hakim Ajmal Khan (Delhi).
5. Maulvi Syed Karamat Husain (Allahabad).
6. Maulvi Sharifuddin (Patna).
7. Nawab Syed Sardar Ali Khan (Bombay).
8. Syed Abdul Rauf (Allahabad).
9. Maulvi Habiburrehman Khan (Aligarh).
10. Sahibzada Aftab Ahmed Khan (Aligarh).
11. Abdul Salam Khan (Rampur).
12. Raees Muhammed Ahtasham Ali (Lucknow)
13. Khan Bahadur Muhammad Muzammilullah Khan. (Aligarh).
14. Haji Muhammed Ismail Khan (Aligarh).
15. Shehzada Bakhtiar Shah (Calcutta).
16. Malik Umar Hayat Khan Tiwana (Shahpur).
17. Khan Bahadur Muhammed Shah Deen (Lahore).
18. Nawab Hazeem Qureshi (Lahore)
19. Khan Bahadur Syed Nawab Ali Chaudhary (Mymansingh).
20. Nawab Bahadur Mirza Shuja'at Ali Baig (Murshidabad).
21. Nawab Nasir Hussain Khan Bahadur (Patna).
22. Khan Bahadur Syed Ameer Hassan Khan (Calcutta).
23. Syed Muhammed Imam (Patna).
24. Nawab Sarfaraz Hussain Khan Bahadur (Patna).
25. Maulvi Rafeeuddin Ahmed (Bombay).
26. Khan Bahadur Ahmed Muhaeeuddin (Madras).
27. Ibraheem Bhai Adamjee Pirbhai (Bombay).
28. Maulvi Abdul Raheem (Calcutta).
29. Syed Allahdad Shah (Khairpur).
30. Maulana H. M. Malik (Nagpur).
31. Khan Bahadur Col. Abdul Majeed Khan (Patiala).
32. Khan Bahadur Khawaja Yousuf Shah (Amritsar).
33. Khan Bahadur Mian Muhammad Shafi. (Lahore).
34. Khan Bahadur Shaikh Ghulam Sadiq. (Amritsar).
35. Syed Nabiullah. (Allahabad).
36. Khalifa Syed Muhammed Khan Bahadur. (Patna).

Until 1937 the Muslim League had remained an organisation of elite Indian Muslims. The Muslim League leadership then began mass mobilisation and the League then became a popular party with the Muslim masses in the 1940s, especially after the Lahore Resolution. Under Jinnah's leadership its membership grew to over two million and became more religious and even separatist in its outlook. The Muslim League's earliest base was the United Provinces. From 1937 onwards, the Muslim League and Jinnah attracted large crowds throughout India in its processions and strikes.

=== Lahore Resolution ===
The Lahore Resolution marked the beginning of the Pakistan movement. At the 27th annual Muslim League session in 1940 at Lahore's Iqbal Park where about 100,000 people gathered to hear Jinnah speak:

Hindus and Muslims belong to two different religions, philosophies, social customs, and literature... It is quite clear that Hindus and Muslims derive their inspiration from different sources of history. They have different epics, different heroes, and different episodes... To yoke together two such nations under a single state, one as a numerical minority and the other as a majority must lead to growing discontent and final destruction of any fabric that may be so built up for the government of such a state.

At Lahore the Muslim League formally committed itself to create an independent Muslim state, including Sindh, Punjab, Baluchistan, the North West Frontier Province and Bengal, that would be "wholly autonomous and sovereign". The resolution guaranteed protection for non-Muslims. The Lahore Resolution, moved by the sitting Chief Minister of Bengal A. K. Fazlul Huq, was adopted on 23 March 1940, and its principles formed the foundation for Pakistan's first constitution.

In opposition to the Lahore Resolution, the All India Azad Muslim Conference gathered in Delhi in April 1940 to voice its support for a united India. Its members included several Islamic organisations in India, as well as 1400 nationalist Muslim delegates.

=== C. R. formula and Cabinet Mission ===
Talks were held between Muhammad Ali Jinnah and Mahatma Gandhi in 1944. Jinnah negotiated as the representative of the Muslims. Gandhi rejected and insisted that the Indian National Congress alone represented all of India, including Muslims. Gandhi proposed the C.R Formula, which sought to first achieve independence from the British and then settle the issue of Pakistan through a plebiscite in Muslim majority districts in which the non-Muslims would also vote. Jinnah rejected both postponing decision on partition of British India and the formula in favour of the immediate creation of Pakistan.

In 1945 and 1946 general and provincial elections were held in India respectively. The Muslim League of Jinnah secured most of the Muslim vote in both elections. Jinnah interpreted the results as the entire Muslim nation's demand for partition and a separate state of Pakistan. Congress was forced to recognise the Muslim League as the sole representative of the Muslims.

The same year the British sent a delegation to India to determine its constitutional status and to address the Hindu-Muslim differences. The delegation proposed a plan that three groups in India be formed. One would consist of the Muslim majority Northwest zone, another would consist of the Hindu majority centre and the third the Eastern zone of India. The proposal further contemplated the independence of Muslim majority provinces after ten years of Indian Independence. An interim government was to be set up until independence.

The Congress Party rejected the separation of the provinces but agreed to the formation of an interim government. The plan stated that whichever party will agree to the whole of the plan will be allowed to form the interim government which would be established after the General elections in 1946.

Jinnah decided to agree to the plan. The British still invited the Congress to form a government with the Muslim League and the Viceroy of India assigned the Office of Prime minister to Nehru of the Indian National Congress.

=== World War II ===
On 3 September 1939, British Prime Minister Neville Chamberlain declared the commencement of war with Germany. Shortly thereafter, Viceroy Lord Linlithgow followed suit and announced that India too was at war with Germany.

In 1939, the Congress leaders resigned from all British India government positions to which they had elected. The Muslim League celebrated the end of the Congress-led British Indian government, with Jinnah famously declaring it "a day of deliverance and thanksgiving". In a secret memorandum to the British Prime Minister, the Muslim League agreed to support the United Kingdom's war efforts—provided that the British recognise it as the only organisation that spoke for Indian Muslims.

Following the Congress's effective protest against the United Kingdom unilaterally involving India in the war without consulting with them, the Muslim League went on to support the British war efforts, which allowed them to actively go against the Congress with the argument of "Islam in Danger".

The Indian Congress and Muslim League responded differently over the World War II issue. The Indian Congress refused to support the British unless the whole Indian subcontinent was granted independence. The Muslim League, on the other hand, supported Britain both politically and via human contributions. The Muslim League leaders' British education, training, and philosophical ideas helped bring the British government and the Muslim League closer to each other. Jinnah himself supported the British in World War II when the Congress failed to collaborate. The British government made a pledge to the Muslims in 1940 that it would not transfer power to an Independent India unless its constitution was first approved by the Indian Muslims, a promise it did not subsequently keep.

=== The end of the war ===
In 1942, Gandhi called for the Quit India Movement against the United Kingdom. On the other hand, the Muslim League advised Prime Minister Winston Churchill that Great Britain should "divide and then Quit". Negotiations between Gandhi and Viceroy Wavell failed, as did talks between Jinnah and Gandhi in 1944. When World War II ended, the Muslim League's push for the Pakistan Movement and Gandhi's efforts for Indian independence intensified the pressure on Prime Minister Churchill. Given the rise of American and Russian dominance in world politics and the general unrest in India, Wavell called for general elections to be held in 1945.

In the 1940s, Jinnah emerged as a leader of the Indian Muslims and was popularly known as Quaid-e-Azam ('Great Leader'). The general elections held in 1945 for the Constituent Assembly of British Indian Empire, the Muslim League secured and won 434 out of 496 seats reserved for Muslims (and about 87.5% of Muslim votes) on a policy of creating an independent state of Pakistan, and with an implied threat of secession if this was not granted. The Congress which was led by Gandhi and Nehru remained adamantly opposed to dividing India. The partition seems to have been inevitable after all, one of the examples being Lord Mountbatten's statement on Jinnah: "There was no argument that could move him from his consuming determination to realise the impossible dream of Pakistan."

American historian Stephen P. Cohen writes in The Idea of Pakistan with regards to the influence of South Asian Muslim nationalism on the Pakistan movement:

[The ethnolinguistic-nationalist narrative] begins with a glorious precolonial state-empire when the Muslims of South Asia were politically united and culturally, civilizationally, and strategically dominant. In that era, ethnolinguistic differences were subsumed under a common vision of an Islamic-inspired social and political order. However, the divisions among Muslims that did exist were exploited by the British, who practiced 'divide-and-rule' politics, displacing the Mughals and circumscribing other Islamic rulers. Moreover, the Hindus were the allies of the British, who used them to strike a balance with the Muslims; many Hindus, a fundamentally insecure people, hated Muslims and would have oppressed them in a one-man, one-vote democratic India. The Pakistan freedom movement united these disparate pieces of the national puzzle, and Pakistan was the expression of the national will of India's liberated Muslims.

— Stephen Cohen, The Idea of Pakistan (2004)

=== 1946 elections ===
The 1946 elections resulted in the Muslim League winning the majority of Muslim votes and reserved Muslim seats in the Central and provincial assemblies, performing exceptionally well in Muslim minority provinces such as UP and Bihar, relative to the Muslim majority provinces of Punjab and NWFP. The Muslim league captured 429 of the total 492 seats reserved for Muslims. Thus, the 1946 election was effectively a plebiscite where the Indian Muslims were to vote on the creation of Pakistan; a plebiscite which the Muslim League won.

This victory was assisted by the support given to the Muslim League by the rural agriculturalists of Bengal as well as the support of the landowners of Sindh and Punjab. The Congress, which initially denied the Muslim League's claim of being the sole representative of Indian Muslims, was now forced to recognise that the Muslim League represented Indian Muslims. The British had no alternative except to take Jinnah's views into account as he had emerged as the sole spokesperson for India's Muslims. However, the British did not desire India to be partitioned and in one last effort to avoid it they arranged the Cabinet Mission plan. In 1946, the Cabinet Mission Plan recommended a decentralised but united India, this was accepted by the Muslim League but rejected by the Congress, thus, leading the way for the Partition of India.

== Political campaigns and support ==
=== Punjab ===
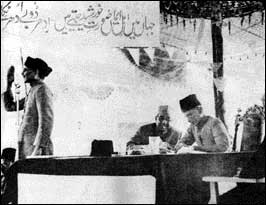
Chaudhry Khaliquszaman seconding the Resolution with Jinnah and Liaquat presiding the session.

In the British Indian province of Punjab, Muslims placed more emphasis on the Punjabi identity they shared with Hindus and Sikhs, rather than on their religion. The Unionist Party, which prevailed in the 1923 Indian general election, 1934 Indian general election and the 1937 Indian provincial elections, had the mass support of the Hindus, Muslims and Sikhs of the Punjab; its leaders included Muslim Punjabis, such as Fazl-i-Hussain and Hindu Punjabis, such as Chhotu Ram. The Punjab had a slight Muslim majority, and local politics had been dominated by the secular Unionist Party and its longtime leader Sir Sikandar Hayat Khan. The Unionists had built a formidable power base in the Punjabi countryside through policies of patronage allowing them to retain the loyalty of landlords and pirs who exerted significant local influence.

For the Muslim League to claim to represent the Muslim vote, they would need to win over the majority of the seats held by the Unionists. Following the death of Sir Sikander in 1942, and bidding to overcome their dismal showing in the elections of 1937, the Muslim League intensified campaigning throughout rural and urban Punjab. A major thrust of the Muslim's League's campaign was the promotion of communalism and spreading fear of a supposed "Hindu threat" in a future united India. Muslim League activists were advised to join in communal prayers when visiting villages, and gain permission to hold meetings after the Friday prayers. The Quran became a symbol of the Muslim League at rallies, and pledges to vote were made on it. Students, a key component of the Muslim League's activists, were trained to appeal to the electorate on communal lines, and at the peak of student activity during the Christmas holidays of 1945, 250 students from Aligarh were invited to campaign in the province along with 1550 members of the Punjab Muslim Student's Federation. A key achievement of these efforts came in enticing Muslim Jats and Gujjars from their intercommunal tribal loyalties. In response, the Unionists attempted to counter the growing religious appeal of the Muslim League by introducing religious symbolism into their own campaign, but with no student activists to rely upon and dwindling support among the landlords, their attempts met with little success.

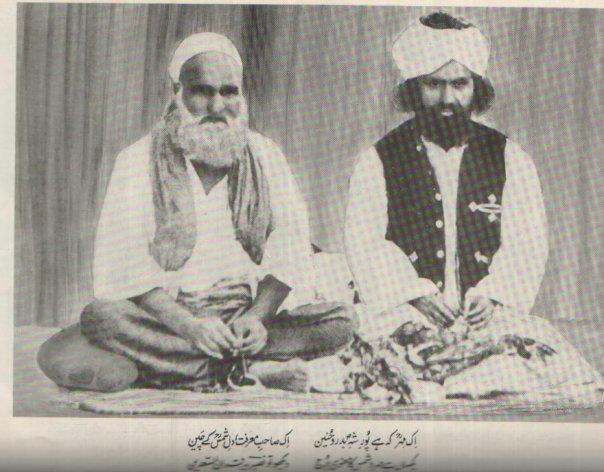
Pir Meher Ali Shah

To further their religious appeal, the Muslim League also launched efforts to entice Pirs towards their cause. Pirs dominated the religious landscape, and were individuals who claimed to inherit religious authority from Sufi Saints who had proselytised in the region since the eleventh century. By the twentieth century, most Punjabi Muslims offered allegiance to a Pir as their religious guide, thus providing them considerable political influence. The Unionists had successfully cultivated the support of Pirs to achieve success in the 1937 elections, and the Muslim League now attempted to replicate their method of doing so. To do so, the Muslim League created the Masheikh Committee, used Urs ceremonies and shrines for meetings and rallies and encouraged fatwas urging support for the Muslim League.

Reasons for the pirs switching allegiance varied. For the Gilani Pirs of Multan the overriding factor was local longstanding factional rivalries, while for many others a shrine's size and relationship with the government dictated its allegiance.

Despite the Muslim League's aim to foster a united Muslim loyalty, it also recognised the need to better exploit the biradari network and appeal to primordial tribal loyalties. In 1946 it held a special Gujjar conference intending to appeal to all Muslim Gujjars, and reversed its expulsion of Jahanara Shahnawaz with the hope of appealing to Arain constituencies. Appealing to biradari ties enabled the Muslim League to accelerate support among landlords, and in turn use the landlords's client-patron economic relationship with their tenants to guarantee votes for the forthcoming election.

A separate strategy of the Muslim League was to exploit the economic slump suffered in the Punjab as a result of the Second World War. The Punjab had supplied 27 per cent of the Indian Army recruits during the war, constituting 800,000 men, and representing a significant part of the electorate. By 1946, less than 20 per cent of those servicemen returning home had found employment. This in part was exacerbated by the speedy end to the war in Asia, which caught the Unionists by surprise, and meant their plans to deploy servicemen to work in canal colonies were not yet ready. The Muslim League took advantage of this weakness and followed Congress's example of providing work to servicemen within its organisation. The Muslim League's ability to offer an alternative to the Unionist government, namely the promise of Pakistan as an answer to the economic dislocation suffered by Punjabi villagers, was identified as a key issue for the election.

On the eve of the elections, the political landscape in the Punjab was finely poised, and the Muslim League offered a credible alternative to the Unionist Party. The transformation itself had been rapid, as most landlords and pirs had not switched allegiance until after 1944. The breakdown of talks between the Punjab Premier, Malik Khizar Hayat Tiwana, and Jinnah in late 1944 had meant many Muslims were now forced to choose between the two parties at the forthcoming election. A further blow for the Unionists came with death of its leading statesman Sir Chhotu Ram in early 1945.

The Western Punjab was home to a minority population of Punjabi Sikhs and Hindus up to 1947 apart from the Muslim majority. In 1947, the Punjab Assembly cast its vote in favour of Pakistan with supermajority rule, which made many minority Hindus and Sikhs migrate to India while Muslim refugees from India settled in the Western Punjab and across Pakistan.

=== Sindh ===
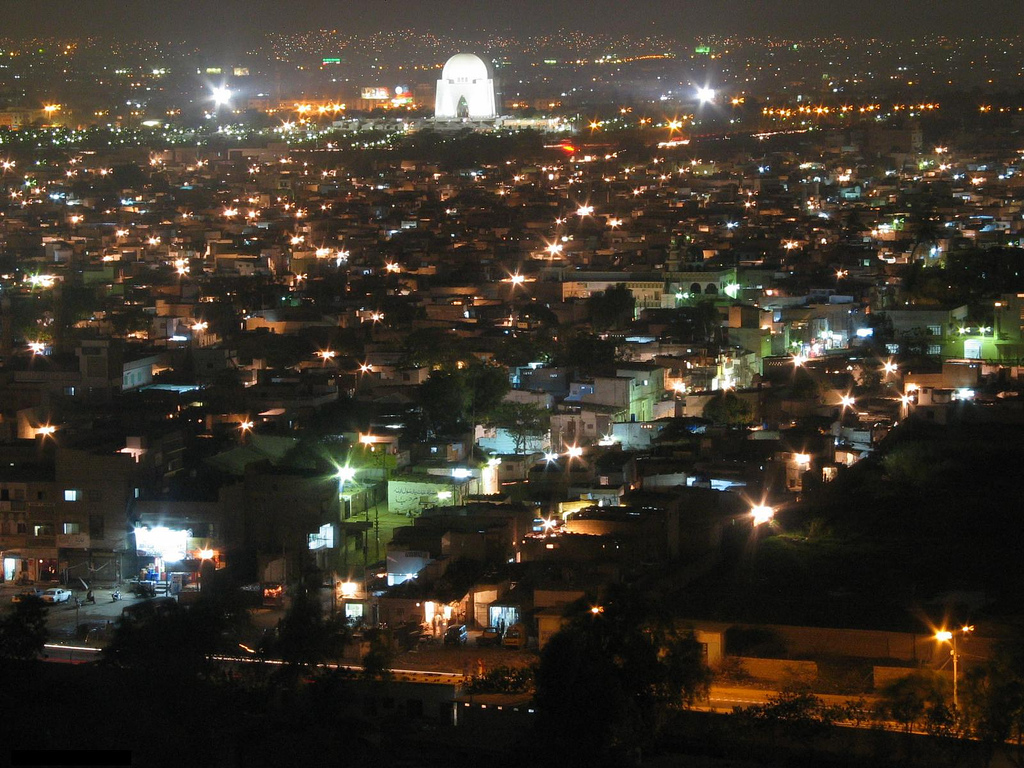
Sindh is the birthplace and burial place of Jinnah, the Founder of Pakistan.

In the Sind province of British India, the Sind United Party promoted communal harmony between Hindus and Muslims, winning 22 out of 33 seats in the 1937 Indian provincial elections.

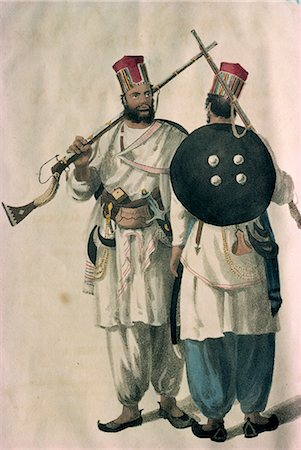
Sindhi foot soldiers, 1816

Both the Muslim landed elite, waderas, and the Hindu commercial elements, banias, collaborated in exploiting the predominantly Muslim peasantry of the British Indian province of Sind. In Sind's first provincial election after its separation from Bombay in 1936, economic interests were an essential factor of politics, informed by religious and cultural issues. Due to British policies, much land in Sind was transferred from Muslim to Hindu hands over the decades. In Sind, "the dispute over the Sukkur Manzilgah had been fabricated by provincial Leaguers to unsettle Allah Bakhsh Soomro's ministry which was dependent on support from the Congress and the Hindu Independent Party." The Sind Muslim League exploited the issue and agitated for what they said was an abandoned mosque to be given to the Muslim League. Consequentially, a thousand members of the Muslim League were imprisoned. Eventually, due to panic the government restored the mosque to Muslims.

The separation of Sind from the Bombay Presidency triggered Sindhi Muslim nationalists to support the Pakistan Movement. Even while the Punjab and North-West Frontier Province were ruled by parties hostile to the Muslim League, Sindh remained loyal to Jinnah. Although the prominent Sindhi Muslim nationalist G.M. Syed (who admired both Hindu and Muslim rulers of Sindh) left the All India Muslim League in the mid-1940s, the overwhelming majority of Sindhi Muslims supported the creation of Pakistan, seeing in it their deliverance. Sindhi support for the Pakistan Movement arose from the desire of the Sindhi Muslim business class to drive out their Hindu competitors.

The Muslim League's rise to becoming the party with the strongest support in Sind was in large part linked to its winning over of the religious pir families. Although the Muslim League had previously fared poorly in the 1937 elections in Sind, when local Sindhi Muslim parties won more seats, the Muslim League's cultivation of support from the pirs and saiyids of Sind in 1946 helped it gain a foothold in the province.

=== North-West Frontier Province ===
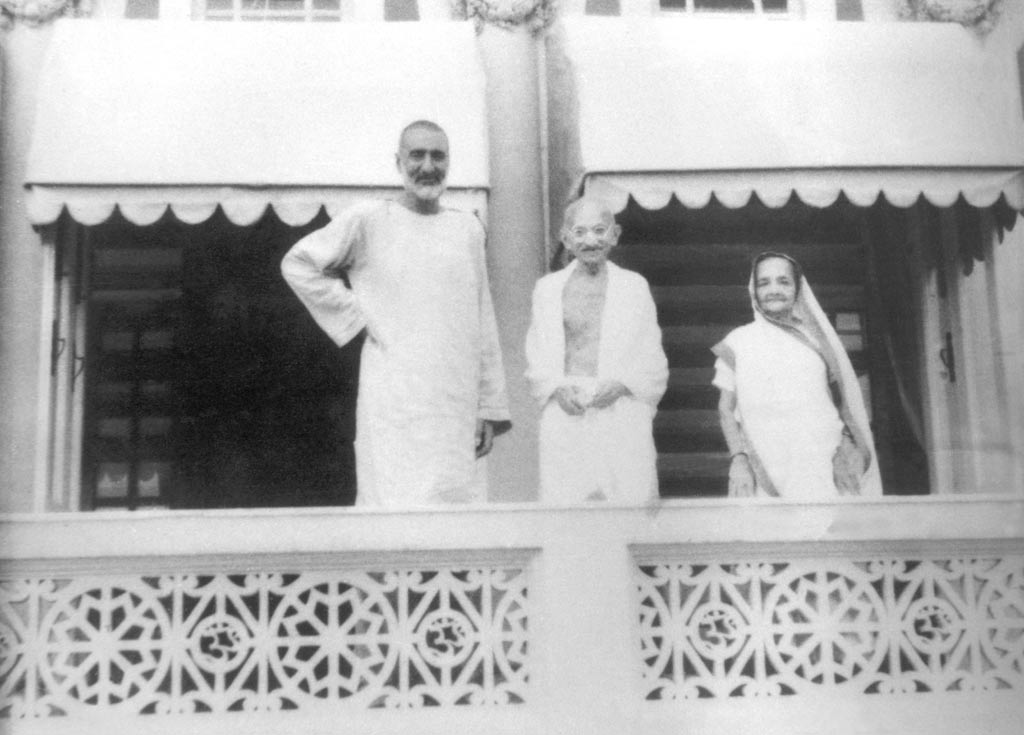
Bacha Khan with Gandhi in 1946.

The Muslim League had little support in North-West Frontier Province. Here the Congress and Pashtun nationalist leader Abdul Ghaffar Khan had considerable support for the cause of a united India.

During the Independence period there was a Congress-led ministry in the province, which was led by secular Pashtun leaders, including Abdul Ghaffar Khan, who preferred joining India instead of Pakistan. The secular Pashtun leadership was also of the view that if joining India was not an option then they should espouse the cause of an independent ethnic Pashtun state rather than Pakistan. The secular stance of Abdul Ghaffar Khan had driven a wedge between the Jamiyatul Ulama Sarhad (JUS) and the otherwise pro-Congress (and pro-Indian unity) Jamiat Ulema Hind, as well as Abdul Ghaffar Khan's Khudai Khidmatgars, who also espoused Hindu-Muslim unity. Unlike the centre JUH, the directives of the JUS in the province began to take on communal tones. The JUS ulama saw the Hindus in the province as a 'threat' to Muslims. Accusations of molesting Muslim women were levelled at Hindu shopkeepers in Nowshera, a town where anti-Hindu sermons were delivered by mullas. Tensions also rose in 1936 over the abduction of a Hindu girl in Bannu. Such controversies stirred up anti-Hindu sentiments among the province's Muslim population. By 1947 the majority of the JUS ulama in the province began supporting the Muslim League's idea of Pakistan.

Immediately prior to Pakistani independence from Britain in 1947, the British held a referendum in the NWFP to allow voters to choose between joining Pakistan or India. The referendum was held on 2 July 1947 while polling began on 6 July 1947 and the referendum results were made public on 20 July 1947. According to the official results, there were 572,798 registered voters out of which 289,244 (99.02%) votes were cast in favour of Pakistan while only 2874 (0.98%) were cast in favour of India. According to an estimate the total turnout for the referendum was only 15% less than the total turnout in the 1946 elections. At the same time a large number of Khudai Khidmatgar supporters boycotted the referendum and intimidation against Hindu and Sikh voters by supporters of the Pakistan Movement was also reported.

=== Baluchistan ===
Jinnah meeting with Baluchistan's leaders.

During British rule in India, Baluchistan was under the rule of a Chief Commissioner and did not have the same status as other provinces of British India. The Muslim League in the period 1927-1947 strived under Jinnah to introduce reforms in Baluchistan to bring it on par with other provinces of British India. Apart from the pro-partition Muslim League that was led by Qazi Muhammad Isa, "three pro-Congress parties were still active in Balochistan's politics", such as the Anjuman-i-Watan Baluchistan, which favoured a united India.

In British-ruled Colonial India, Baluchistan contained a Chief Commissioner's province and princely states (including Makran, Las Bela and Kharan) that became a part of Pakistan. The instrument of referendum was applied in Chaghi to Zhob (in northern Balochistan), to determine the will of the people which resulted in a victory for the Muslim League. The province's Shahi Jirga and the non-official members of the Quetta Municipality, agreed to join Pakistan unanimously on 29 June 1947; however, the Shahi Jirga was stripped of its members from the Kalat State prior to the vote. According to Rafi Sheikh, the then president of the Baluchistan Muslim League, Qazi Muhammad Isa, informed Jinnah that "Shahi Jirga in no way represents the popular wishes of the masses" and that members of the Kalat State were "excluded from voting; only representatives from the British part of the province voted and the British part included the leased areas of Quetta, Nasirabad Tehsil, Nushki and Bolan Agency." Following the referendum, the Khan of Kalat, on 22 June 1947, received a letter from members of the Shahi Jirga, as well as sardars from the leased areas of Baluchistan, stating that they, "as a part of the Baloch nation, were a part of the Kalat state too" and that if the question of Baluchistan's accession to Pakistan arise, "they should be deemed part of the Kalat state rather than (British) Balochistan". This has brought into question whether a vote took place in the princely Kalat state, the consensus of which remains disputed.

The pro-India Congress, which drew support from Hindus and some Muslims, sensing that geographic and demographic compulsions would not allow the province's inclusion into the newly Independent India, began to encourage separatist elements in Balochistan, and other Muslim majority provinces such as NWFP.

Kalat finally acceded to Pakistan on 27 March 1948 after the help of All India Radio and a period of negotiations and bureaucracy. The signing of the Instrument of Accession by Ahmad Yar Khan, led his brother, Prince Abdul Karim, to revolt against his brother's decision in July 1948. Princes Agha Abdul Karim Baloch and Muhammad Rahim refused to lay down arms, leading the Dosht-e Jhalawan in unconventional attacks on the army until 1950. Though the Princes fought a lone battle without support from the rest of Baluchistan.

=== Bengal ===
Dhaka was the birthplace of the All India Muslim League in 1906. The Pakistan Movement was highly popular in the Muslim population of Bengal. Many of the Muslim League's notable statesmen and activists hailed from East Bengal, including Khabeeruddin Ahmed, Sir Abdul Halim Ghuznavi, Anwar-ul Azim, Huseyn Shaheed Suhrawardy, Jogendra Nath Mandal, Khawaja Nazimuddin, and Nurul Amin, many among whom later became Prime ministers of Pakistan. Following the partition of Bengal, violence erupted in the region, which was mainly contained to Kolkata and Noakhali.

It is documented by Pakistani historians that Suhrawardy wanted Bengal to be an independent state that would neither join Pakistan or India but would remain unpartitioned. Despite the heavy criticism from the Muslim League, Jinnah realised the validity of Suhrawardy's argument and gave his tacit support to the idea of an Independent Bengal. Nevertheless, the Indian National Congress decided for partition of Bengal in 1947, which was additionally ratified in the subsequent years.

=== Rohingya Muslims ===
During the Pakistan Movement in the 1940s, Rohingya Muslims in western Burma had an ambition to annex and merge their region into East-Pakistan. Before the independence of Burma in January 1948, Muslim leaders from Arakan addressed themselves to Jinnah, the founder of Pakistan, and asked his assistance in annexing of the Mayu region to Pakistan which was about to be formed. Two months later, the North Arakan Muslim League was founded in Akyab (modern: Sittwe, capital of Arakan State), it, too demanding annexation to Pakistan. However, it is noted that the proposal never materialised after it was reportedly turned down by Jinnah.

=== Role of Ulama ===
The Ulama support for the Pakistan Movement came in the form of the New Medina construct, which was formulated by the Barelvis and a section of the Deobandi clergy. In its election campaign in 1946 the Muslim League drew upon the support of Islamic scholars and Sufis with the rallying cry of 'Islam in danger'. The majority of Barelvis supported the creation of Pakistan and Barelvi ulama issued fatwas in support of the Muslim League. In contrast, most Deobandi ulama (led by Hussain Ahmad Madani) opposed the creation of Pakistan and the two-nation theory. Husain Ahmad Madani and the Deobandis advocated composite nationalism, according to which Muslims and Hindus were one nation (cf. Composite Nationalism and Islam). Madani differentiated between qaum -which meant a multi-religious nation - and millat - which was exclusively the social unity of Muslims.

However, a few highly influential Deobandi clerics did support the creation of Pakistan. Such Deobandi ulama included Ashraf Ali Thanwi, Muhammad Shafi, Shabbir Ahmad Usmani, and Zafar Ahmad Usmani. Thanwi was one of the chief proponent of this Movement. He also sent groups of Muslim scholars to give religious advice and reminders to Jinnah, he dismissed the criticism that most Muslim League members were not practising Muslims. Thanwi was of the view that the Muslim League should be supported and also be advised at the same time to become religiously observant. Thanwi's disciples Shabbir Ahmad Usmani and Zafar Ahmad Usmani were key players in religious support for the creation of Pakistan.

Acknowledging the services of these ulema, Shabbir Ahmad Usmani was honoured to raise the flag of Pakistan in Karachi and Zafar Ahamd Usmani in Dhaka. Once, the Quaid-i-Azam Muhammad Ali Jinnah was asked whether there was any Islamic cleric who authenticated the division of India on religious bases. Jinnah replied that there was Arshraf Ali Thanwi, and his support to the cause of Muslim League was enough. The Barelvis had no representation in the constituent assemblies of Pakistan, whereas the Deobandis had their representatives even in the first Constituent Assembly.

=== Muslim minority provinces of British India ===
The idea of Pakistan received overwhelming support from Muslim minority provinces of British India, specially the Muslim cultural heartland of U.P. The Muslim League was known to gain its first foothold in the United Provinces, from where it derived a substantial portion of its leadership.

== Conclusion ==
Sir Syed Ahmad Khan's (1817–1898) philosophical ideas played a direct role in the Pakistan Movement. His Two-Nation Theory became more and more obvious during the Congress rule (1937-1939) in India. In 1946 it was seen that Muslim majorities in the North-west and North-east India had agreed to the idea of Pakistan, as a response to Congress's policies, which were also the result of leaders such as Jinnah leaving the party in favour of the Muslim League, Congress had won in seven of the eleven provinces in 1937 but the Muslim League failed to achieve majority in any province.

But the main motivating and integrating factor was that the Muslims' intellectual class wanted representation; the masses needed a platform on which to unite. It was the dissemination of western thought by John Locke, Milton and Thomas Paine, at the Aligarh Muslim University that initiated the emergence of Pakistan Movement. According to Pakistan Studies curriculum, Muhammad bin Qasim is often referred to as 'the first Pakistani'. Muhammad Ali Jinnah also acclaimed the Pakistan movement to have started when the first Muslim put foot in the Gateway of Islam.

After the independence in 1947, violence and upheavals continued to be faced by Pakistan, as Liaquat Ali Khan became the Prime Minister of Pakistan in 1947. The issue involving the equal status of Urdu and Bengali languages created divergence in the country's political ideology. The military take over in 1958 was followed by rapid industrialisation in the 1960s. Economic grievances, unbalanced financial payments, provincialism and ethnic nationalism led to a bloody armed struggle in East Pakistan in the early 1970s, which eventually resulted with East Pakistan becoming Bangladesh in 1971.

In the successive periods of the tragedy of East-Pakistan, the country continued to rebuild and reconstruct itself constitutionally and embarked on its path to be transformed into republicanism in its full measure. The XIII amendment (1997) and XVIII amendment (2010) transformed the country into becoming a parliamentary republic as well as also becoming a nuclear power in the subcontinent.

=== Non-Muslims contribution and efforts ===
Jinnah's vision was supported by a few of the Hindus, Sikhs, Parsis, Jews and Christians who lived in Muslim-dominated regions of undivided India. The most notable and influential Hindu figure in the Pakistan Movement was Jogendra Nath Mandal from Bengal. Jagannath Azad was from the Urdu-speaking belt. Mandal represented the Hindu contingent calling for an independent Pakistan, and was one of the founding fathers of Pakistan. After independence, Mandal was given ministries of Law, Justice, and Work-Force by Jinnah in Liaquat Ali Khan's government. Ironically, despite all his good contributions, Mandal was badly ignored in the emerging political scenario. He returned to India and submitted his resignation to Liaquat Ali Khan, the then-Prime Minister of Pakistan. He mentioned incidents related to social injustice and a biased attitude towards non-Muslim minorities in his resignation letter.

Although the All India Conference of Indian Christians opposed the partition of India and creation of Pakistan, a minority of Christians dissented from this position and played a pivotal role in the creation of Pakistan. The notable Christians included Sir Victor Turner and Alvin Robert Cornelius. Turner was responsible for the economic, financial planning of the country after independence. Turner was one of the founding fathers of Pakistan, and guided Jinnah and Ali Khan on economic affairs, taxation and handling of the administrative units. Alvin Robert Cornelius was elevated as Chief Justice of Lahore High Court bench by Jinnah and served as Law Secretary in Liaquat Ali Khan's government.

=== As an example or inspiration ===
The Pakistan Movement became an inspiration in different countries of the world. Protection of one's beliefs, equal rights, and liberty were incorporated in the state's constitution. Arguments presented by Ali Mazrui pointed out that the South Sudan's movement led to the partition of the Sudan into Sudan proper, which is primarily Muslim, and South Sudan, which is primarily Christian and animistic.

In Europe, Alija Izetbegović, the first President of the Republic of Bosnia and Herzegovina, began to embrace the "Pakistan model" in the 1960s, alienating Serbs who would use this ideology to attack Bosniaks later on, while in his Islamic Declaration he "designated Pakistan as a model country to be emulated by Muslim revolutionaries worldwide."

=== Memory and legacy ===
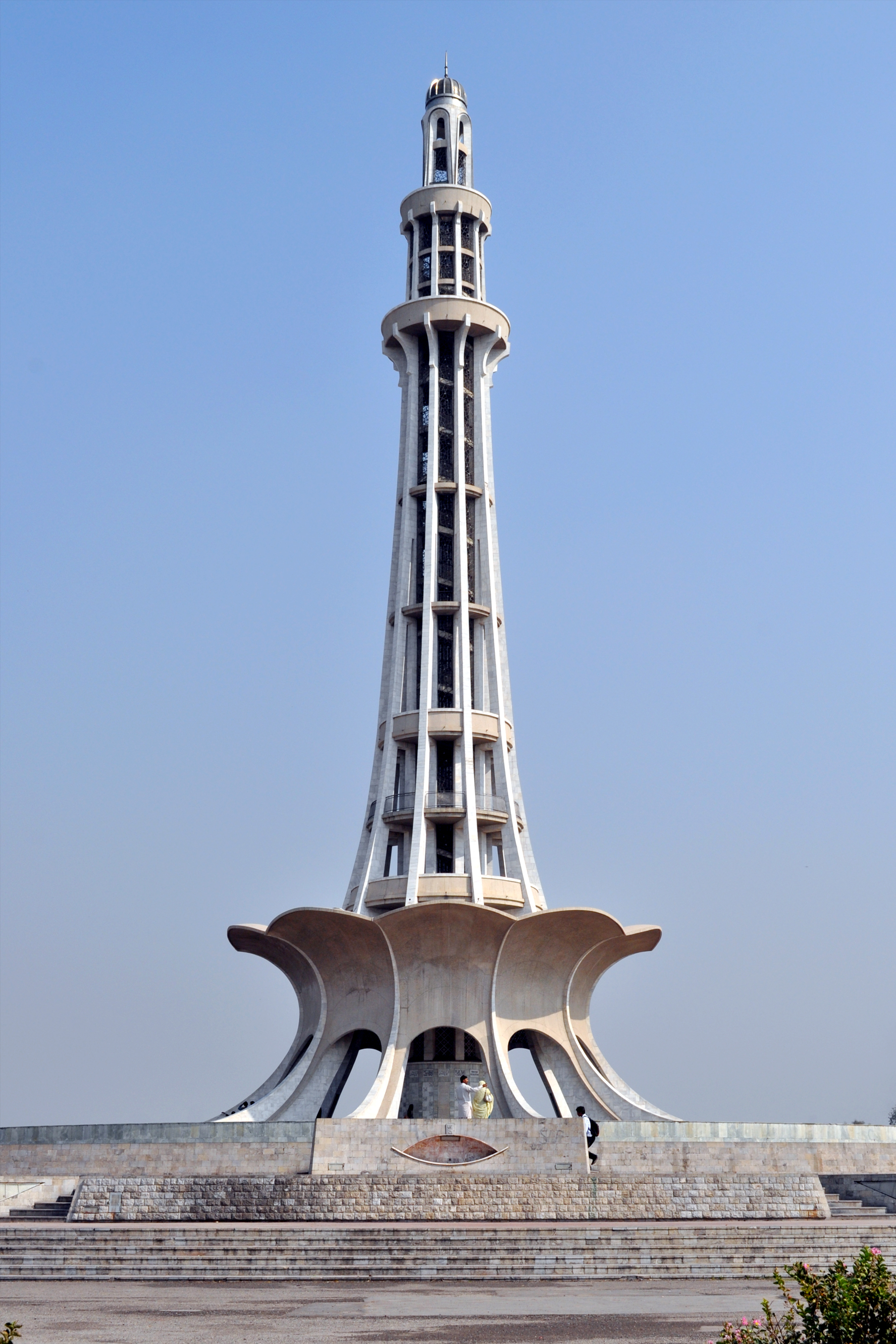
Minar-e-Pakistan, where the bill of Lahore Resolution was passed on 22-24 March 1940

The Pakistan Movement has a central place in Pakistan's memory. The founding story of the Pakistan Movement is not only covered in school and university textbooks but also in innumerable monuments. Almost all key events are covered in Pakistan's textbooks, literature, and novels as well. Thus, the Fourteenth of August is one of major and most celebrated national days in Pakistan. To many authors and historians, Jinnah's legacy is Pakistan.

The Minar-e-Pakistan is a monument which has attracted ten thousand visitors. The Minar-e-Pakistan still continues to project the memory to the people to remember the birth of Pakistan. Jinnah's estates in Karachi and Ziarat has attracted thousands visitors.

Historian of Pakistan, Vali Nasr, argues that the Islamic universalism had become a main source of the Pakistan Movement that shaped patriotism, meaning, and nation's birth. To many Pakistanis, Jinnah's role is viewed as a modern Moses-like leader; while many other founding fathers of the nation-state also occupy extremely respected places in the hearts of the people of Pakistan.

== Timeline ==
- 1906 Founding of the All-India Muslim League
- 1909 Minto–Morley Reforms
- 1913–20 Silk Letter Movement
- 1914–18 World War I
- 1916 Lucknow Pact
- 1919 Formation of Jamiat Ulema-e-Hind
- 1919 Jallianwala Bagh massacre
- 1919 Montagu–Chelmsford Reforms
- 1919 Rowlatt Act
- 1919–22 Khilafat Movement
- 1922–29 Hindu–Muslim riots
- 1928 Nehru Report
- 1928 Simon Commission
- 1929 Fourteen Points of Jinnah
- 1929 Formation of Majlis-e Ahrar-e Islam
- 1930 Allama Iqbal Address
- 1930–32 Round Table Conferences
- 1932 Communal Award
- 1933 Pakistan National Movement
- 1933 Pakistan Declaration / "Now or Never" pamphlet
- 1935 Government of India Act
- 1937 Elections
- 1937–39 Indian National Congress Rule in 7 out of 11 provinces
- 1938 Madani–Iqbal debate
- 1938 A. K. Fazlul Huq of Bengal joined Muslim League
- 1938 Jinnah–Sikandar Pact
- 1939-45 World War II
- 1939 Resignation of Congress ministries
- 1940 Pakistan Resolution
- 1940 19 March Khaksar Massacre in Lahore
- 1942 Quit India Movement with non-Congress players further getting space
- 1942 Cripps Mission
- 1944 Gandhi-Jinnah talks
- 1945 Jamiat Ulema-e-Islam
- 1945 Simla Conference
- 1946 The Cabinet Mission the last British effort to united India
- 1946 Direct Action Day in the aftermath of the Cabinet Mission Plan's failure
- 1946 Interim Government installed in office
- 1947 June 3 Partition Plan
- 1947 Creation of Pakistan

== Notable quotations ==
Allama Iqbal:

I would like to see the Punjab, North-West Frontier Province, Sind and Baluchistan amalgamated into a single State. Self-government within the British Empire, or without the British Empire, the formation of a consolidated North-West Indian Muslim State appears to me to be the final destiny of the Muslims, at least of North-West India.

Choudhry Rahmat Ali:

At this solemn hour in the history of India, when British and Indian statesmen are laying the foundations of a Federal Constitution for that land, we address this appeal to you, in the name of our common heritage, on behalf of our thirty million Muslim brethren who live in Pakistan – by which we mean the five Northern units of India, Viz: Punjab, North-West Frontier Province (Afghan Province), Kashmir, Sind and Baluchistan – for your sympathy and support in our grim and fateful struggle against political crucifixion and complete annihilation.

Muhammad Ali Jinnah:

It is extremely difficult to appreciate why our Hindu friends fail to understand the real nature of Islam and Hinduism. They are not religious in the strict sense of the word, but are, in fact, different and distinct social orders, and it is a dream that the Hindus and Muslims can ever evolve a common nationality, and this misconception of one Indian nation has troubles and will lead India to destruction if we fail to revise our notions in time. The Hindus and Muslims belong to two different religious philosophies, social customs, literature. They neither intermarry nor interdine together and, indeed, they belong to two different civilizations which are based mainly on conflicting ideas and conceptions. Their aspect on life and of life are different. It is quite clear that Hindus and Muslims derive their inspiration from different sources of history. They have different ethics, different heroes, and different episodes. Very often the hero of one is a foe of the other and, likewise, their victories and defeats overlap. To yoke together two such nations under a single state, one as a numerical minority and the other as a majority must lead to growing discontent and final destruction of any fabric that may be so built for the government of such a state.

== Founding leaders ==
- Choudhry Rahmat Ali
- Muhammad Ali Jinnah
- Muhammad Iqbal
- Aga Khan III
- Liaquat Ali Khan
- Sardar Abdur Rab Nishtar
- Muhammad Zafarullah Khan
- Huseyn Shaheed Suhrawardy
- Jogendra Nath Mandal
- A. K. Fazlul Huq
- Ghulam Bhik Nairang
- Khwaja Nazimuddin
- Jalal-ud-din Jalal Baba
- Chaudhry Naseer Ahmad Malhi
- Muhammad Arif Khan Rajbana Sial
- Zafar Ali Khan
- Ra'ana Liaquat Ali Khan
- Fatima Jinnah

== See also ==
- History of Pakistan
  - History of Modern Pakistan
- Muhammad Ali Jinnah
- Madani–Iqbal debate
- National Monument, Islamabad
- Nawab Mohammad Ismail Khan
- Pakistani nationalism
- Pakistan Zindabad
- A Short History of Pakistan
