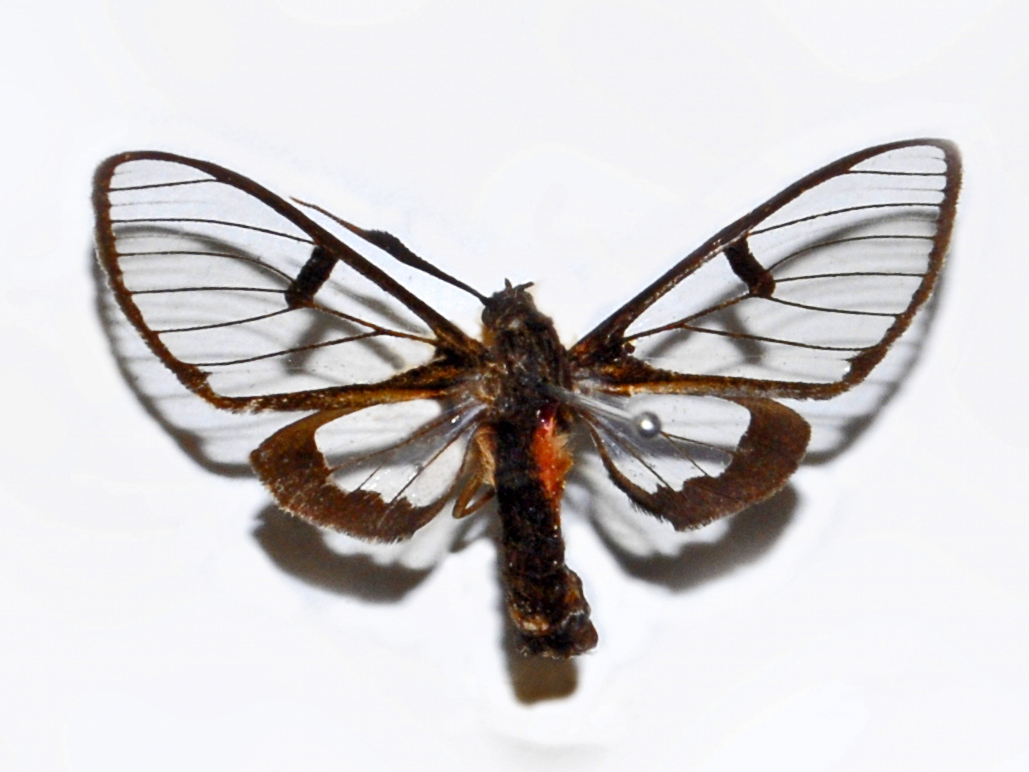
- Mounted specimen

Scientific classification
- Kingdom: Animalia
- Phylum: Arthropoda
- Clade: Pancrustacea
- Class: Insecta
- Order: Lepidoptera
- Superfamily: Noctuoidea
- Family: Erebidae
- Subfamily: Arctiinae
- Genus: Dinia
- Species: D. mena

Binomial name
- Dinia mena (Hübner, [1827])

Synonyms
- Eunomia mena Hübner, [1827]; Glaucopis saucia Walker, 1854

= Dinia mena =

Species of moth

Dinia mena is a moth of the family Erebidae. It was described by Jacob Hübner in 1827.

== Description ==
The wings are hyaline (glass like), except to the black veins and borders. The forewings show a black band across the base, and the hindwings have a broad black band on the hind border. The head and thorax are black, while the abdomen is mainly red with a black tip.

== Distribution ==
This species can be found in Colombia, Venezuela, Trinidad and Brazil.
