= Pakistan Declaration =

1933 book by Choudhry Rahmat Ali

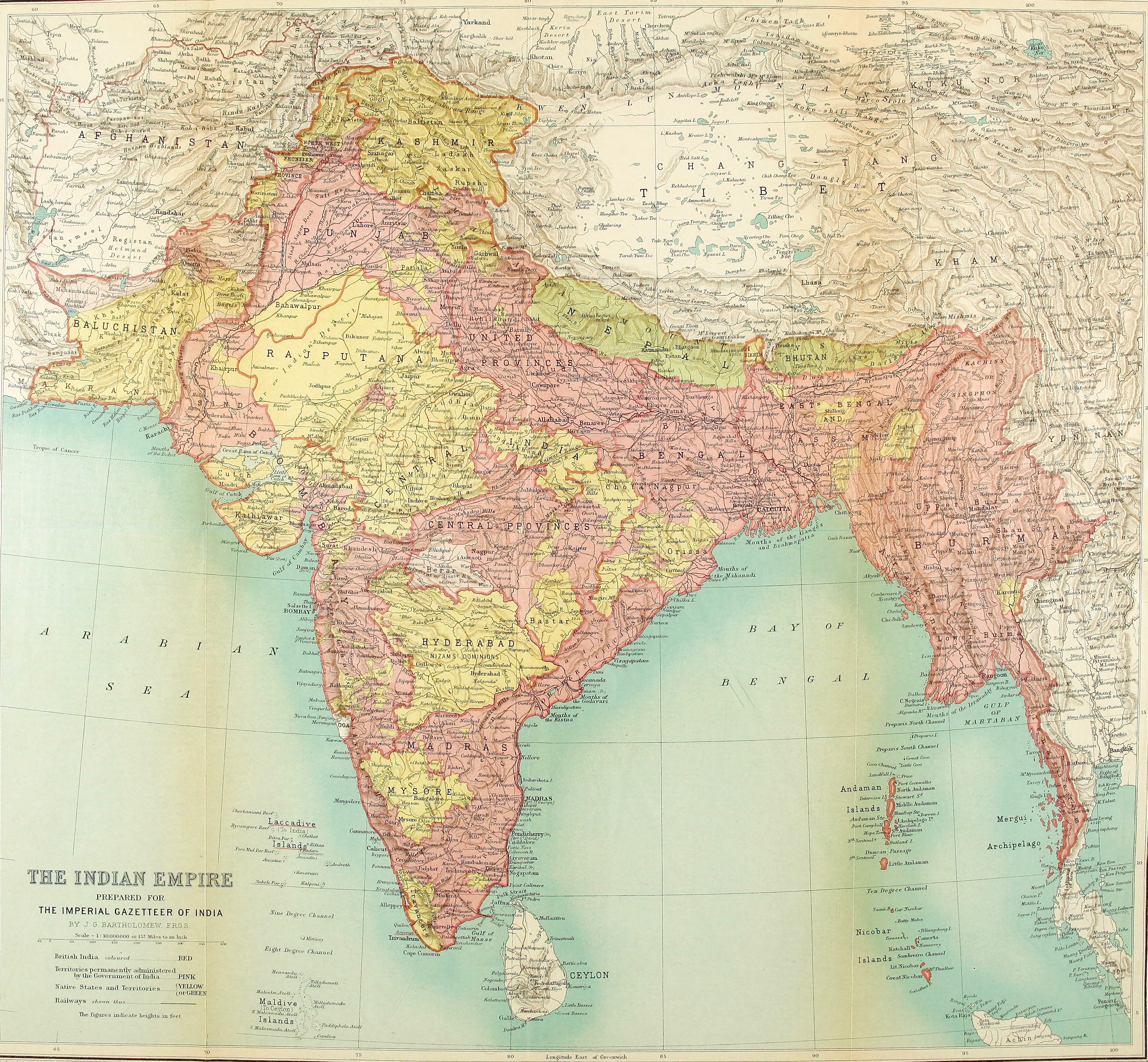
1922 map of British India

The "Pakistan Declaration" (titled Now or Never; Are We to Live or Perish Forever?) was a pamphlet written and published by Choudhry Rahmat Ali, on 28 January 1933, in which the word Pakstan (without the letter "i") was used for the first time and was circulated to the delegates of the Third Round Table Conference in 1933.

== Covering letter ==
The pamphlet was created for circulation to the British and Indian delegates to the Third Round Table Conference in London in 1933.

It was addressed with a covering letter dated 28 January 1933 signed by Ali alone and addressed from 3 Humberstone Road. It states:

I am enclosing herewith an appeal on behalf of the thirty million Muslims of PAKSTAN, who live in the five Northern Units of India—Punjab, North-West Frontier (Afghan) Province, Kashmir, Sind, and Baluchistan. It embodies their demand for the recognition of their national status, as distinct from the other inhabitants of India, by the grant to Pakistan of a separate Federal Constitution on religious, social and historical grounds.

== Now or Never; Are We to Live or Perish Forever? ==
The pamphlet started with this famous sentence:

At this solemn hour in the history of India, when British and Indian statesmen are laying the foundations of a Federal Constitution for that land, we address this appeal to you, in the name of our common heritage, on behalf of our thirty million Muslim brethren who live in PAKSTAN—by which we mean the five Northern units of India, Viz: Punjab, North-West Frontier Province (Afghan Province), Kashmir, Sindh and Baluchistan.

The pamphlet asked that "the five Northern units of India"—Punjab, North-West Frontier Province (Afghan Province), Kashmir, Sindh (then part of Bombay and Sind) and Baluchistan (or Pakstan) become a state independent of the proposed Indian Federation.

Ali's pamphlet had a clear and succinct description of the Muslims of his proposed 'Pakstan' as a 'nation', which was derived from the two-nation theory of Muslim reformer Syed Ahmed Khan

Our religion and culture, our history and tradition, our social code and economic system, our laws of inheritance, succession and marriage are fundamentally different from those of most people's living in the rest of India. The ideals which move our people to make the highest sacrifices are essentially different from those which inspire the Hindus to do the same. These differences are not confined to broad, basic principles. Far from it. They extend to the minutest details of our lives. We do not inter-dine; we do not inter-marry. Our national customs and calendars, even our diet and dress are different.

— Choudhry Rahmat Ali in January 1933

Ali believed that the delegates of the first and second Round Table Conferences committed 'an inexcusable blunder and an incredible betrayal' by accepting the principle of an All-India Federation. He demanded that the national status of the 30 million Muslims of the northwestern units be recognized and a separate Federal Constitution be granted to them.

Professor Khursheed Kamal Aziz (K. K. Aziz) writes that "Rahmat Ali alone drafted this declaration." The word Pakstan was used for the first time in this pamphlet. To make it "representative", he looked for people who would sign it along with him. This difficult search among the firm grip of 'Indianism' on the young intellectual at English universities took him more than a month to find three young men in London who offered to support and sign it.

After the publication of the pamphlet, the Hindu press vehemently criticized it, and the word "Pakstan" used in it. Thus, this word became a heated topic of debate. With the addition of an "i" to improve the pronunciation, the name of Pakistan grew in popularity and combined with the philosophy of Muhammad Iqbal, the two nation theory of Syed Ahmad Khan and views of Jinnah led to the commencement of the Pakistan Movement, and consequently the creation of Pakistan as an independent state in 1947.

== Aftermath ==
In later pamphlets, other than Pakistan, Ali also suggested the establishment of several other Muslim states within the subcontinent, such as Bangistan and Osmanistan. He suggested the former Muslim provinces of Eastern Bengal and Assam in East India become Bangistan, an independent Muslim state for Bengali, Assamese and Bihari speaking Muslims. He also suggested the princely state of Hyderabad become an Islamic monarchy called Osmanistan.

After the Muslim League's acceptance of the British partition plan on 3 June 1947, he issued a statement six days later called "The Great Betrayal" in asking for the rejection of the British plan and the acceptance of his Pakistan plan. He was unhappy over a smaller Pakistan than the one he had conceived in his 1933 pamphlet Now or Never. He condemned Jinnah for accepting a smaller Pakistan, and is said to have called him "Quisling-e-Azam". (Note: The branding of Jinnah is found in Ali's 1947 pamphlet titled The Greatest Betrayal, the Millat's Martyrdom & The Muslim's Duty. "Quisling" is an allusion to Vidkun Quisling, a Norwegian leader who ran a puppet regime under Nazis.) In the end the British plan was accepted, and Ali's was rejected. Ali voiced his dissatisfaction with the creation of Pakistan for the rest of his life.

== Author ==
The author of this pamphlet was Choudhry Rahmat Ali (16 November 1897 – 3 February 1951), a Muslim nationalist from Punjab, who was one of the earliest proponents of the creation of the state of Pakistan. He is credited with creating the name "Pakistan" for a separate Muslim homeland from Presidencies and provinces of British India. He had propagated the Scheme of Pakistan with a missionary zeal since its inception in 1933. He also later founded the Pakistan National Movement to propagate his ideas. Being a political thinker and an idealist, he wanted more than to accept a smaller Pakistan in 1947.

After the partition and creation of Pakistan in 1947, Ali returned to Lahore, planning to stay in the country, but he was expelled from Pakistan by the then Prime Minister Liaqat Ali Khan. His belongings were confiscated, and he left empty-handed for England in October 1948.

Ali died on 3 February 1951 in Cambridge. According to Thelma Frost, he was "destitute, forlorn and lonely" at the time of his death. Fearing (correctly) that he may have died insolvent, the Master of Emmanuel College, Cambridge, Edward Welbourne, instructed that the College would cover the funeral expenses. He was buried on 20 February at Cambridge City Cemetery in Cambridge, England. The funeral expenses and other medical expenses were repaid by the High Commissioner for Pakistan in November 1953, after what was described as a "protracted correspondence" between the London office and the relevant authorities in Pakistan.
