= Choudhry Rahmat Ali =

Muslim nationalist activist (1897–1951)

Chaudhary Rahmat Ali
- چودھری رحمت علی
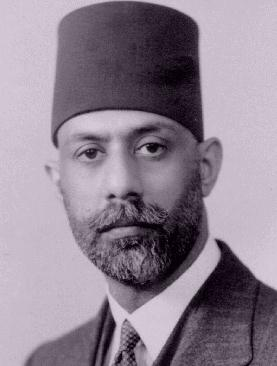
- Born: 16 November 1897; Balachaur, Garhshankar Tahsil, Hoshiarpur, Punjab, British India (Now Punjab, India)
- Died: 3 February 1951 (aged 53); Cambridge, England
- Resting place: Cambridge City Cemetery, Cambridge, England

Academic background
- Education: Lahore Islamia College; University of Cambridge

Academic work
- Notable works: "Pakistan Declaration"
- Notable ideas: Conception of "Pakistan"

Chaudhary Rahmat Ali (Note: (Urdu: چودھری رحمت علی; Urdu: [tʃoː(ɦ)dəɾi ɾɛɦmət əli]) (16 November 1897 – 3 February 1951) was a Muslim nationalist activist who is credited with coining the name "Pakistan" for a separate Muslim homeland in British India and is sometimes regarded as the originator of the Pakistan Movement.

Born in Balachaur, Punjab, Rahmat Ali got his education in Lahore. His seminal contribution was when he was a law student at the University of Cambridge in 1933, in the form of a pamphlet "Now or Never; Are We to Live or Perish Forever?", also known as the "Pakistan Declaration". The pamphlet was addressed to the British and Indian delegates to the Third Round Table Conference in London. The ideas did not find favour with the delegates or any of the politicians for close to a decade. They were dismissed as students' ideas particularly by Muhammad Ali Jinnah but, by 1940, the Muslim politicians in the subcontinent came around to accept them, leading to the Lahore Resolution of the All-India Muslim League, which was immediately dubbed the "Pakistan Resolution" in the press.

After the creation of Pakistan, Ali returned from England in April 1948, planning to stay in the country, but his belongings were confiscated and he was expelled by Prime Minister Liaquat Ali Khan. In October 1948, Ali left empty-handed. He died on 3 February 1951 in Cambridge "destitute, forlorn and lonely". The funeral expenses of insolvent Ali were covered by Emmanuel College, Cambridge on the instructions of its Master - Edward Welbourne. Ali was buried on 20 February 1951 at Cambridge City Cemetery.

== Early life ==
Rahmat Ali was born on 16 November 1897 in the village of Balachaur in the Garhshankar Tahsil of Hoshiarpur District in the Punjab Province of British India. He was born into a Punjabi Muslim family. His father, Haji Shah Muhammad, had two wives; Rahmat Ali was the son of the second. She died when he was too young to remember her, and he was raised by his stepmother. According to the historian K. K. Aziz, who knew Ali personally, he was from the Gorsi clan of Gujjar tribe.

== Education and career ==
As Balachaur was a small village, Ali had to continue his education in the town of Rahon where there was a middle school. After leaving middle school Ali travelled to Jalandhar in 1910 to enroll in the Saindas Anglo Sanskrit High School - then after matriculation in 1912, he then joined Islamia College Lahore later that year. He passed the intermediate examination in 1915 with English, history, maths and Persian as his subjects of study, he went on to earn a BA degree from Islamia college in 1918, reading English, economics and Persian. During his time at the college he had been secretary of the college debating union as well as being secretary and vice president of his tutorial group - additionally he was editor of the college magazine Crescent.

Outside of college, Ali served as assistant editor of Kashmir, a well-known paper of that time founded and edited by Munshi Muhammad Dın Fauq Kashmiri. Ali had written several articles on Indian history and politics, arguing that northern or north western India was the homeland of the Muslims and that they had the right to rule over it. One of these articles cost him his job, entitled "مغرب کی کورانا تقلید" i.e. "Maghrıb ky Korana Taqlid" (Blind Imitation of the West). The article soon attracted the notice of the British authorities, prompting the Deputy Commissioner of Lahore, Henry Phillips Tollinton, to summon Fauq to his office. There, Tollinton issued a stern reprimand and cautioned him of potential punitive measures should such an incident recur. In the aftermath of this confrontation, Fauq dismissed Ali from his position.

After graduating from Lahore Islamia College in 1918, he taught at Lahore Aitchison College and after this, he served as the Chief Advisor to Sir Nawab Murad Buksh Khan Mazari for six years. During this period, he also took on the role of teacher to Mazari's children, including Mir Balakh Sher Mazari who would later become the Caretaker Prime Minister of Pakistan, and Sardar Sherbaz Khan Mazari, who was the Leader of the Opposition and the head of the Movement for the Restoration of Democracy, before joining Punjab University to study law. In 1930, he decided to move to England to study law at Emmanuel College, Cambridge which he joined in 1931. Subsequently, he obtained a BA degree in 1933 and MA in 1940 from the University of Cambridge. In 1933, he published a pamphlet, "Now or Never", coining the word Pakistan for the first time. In 1943, he was called to the Bar, from Middle Temple, London.

In 1946, he founded the Pakistan National Movement in England. Until 1947, he continued publishing various booklets about his vision for South Asia. The final Partition of India disillusioned him due to the mass killings and mass migrations it ended up producing. He was also dissatisfied with the distribution of areas between the two countries in The Greatest Betrayal he wrote of the six "deadly blows" that he believes Jinnah had dealt against the Muslims by accepting a smaller Pakistan than Ali had envisioned and considered it a major reason for the disturbances.

== Philosophy ==
Ali's writings, in addition to those of Muhammad Iqbal and others, were major catalysts for the formation of Pakistan. He offered the name "Bangistan" for a Muslim homeland in the Bengal region, and "Osmanistan" for a Muslim homeland in the Deccan. He also suggested Dinia as a name for a South Asia of various religions.

== Conception of 'Pakistan' ==
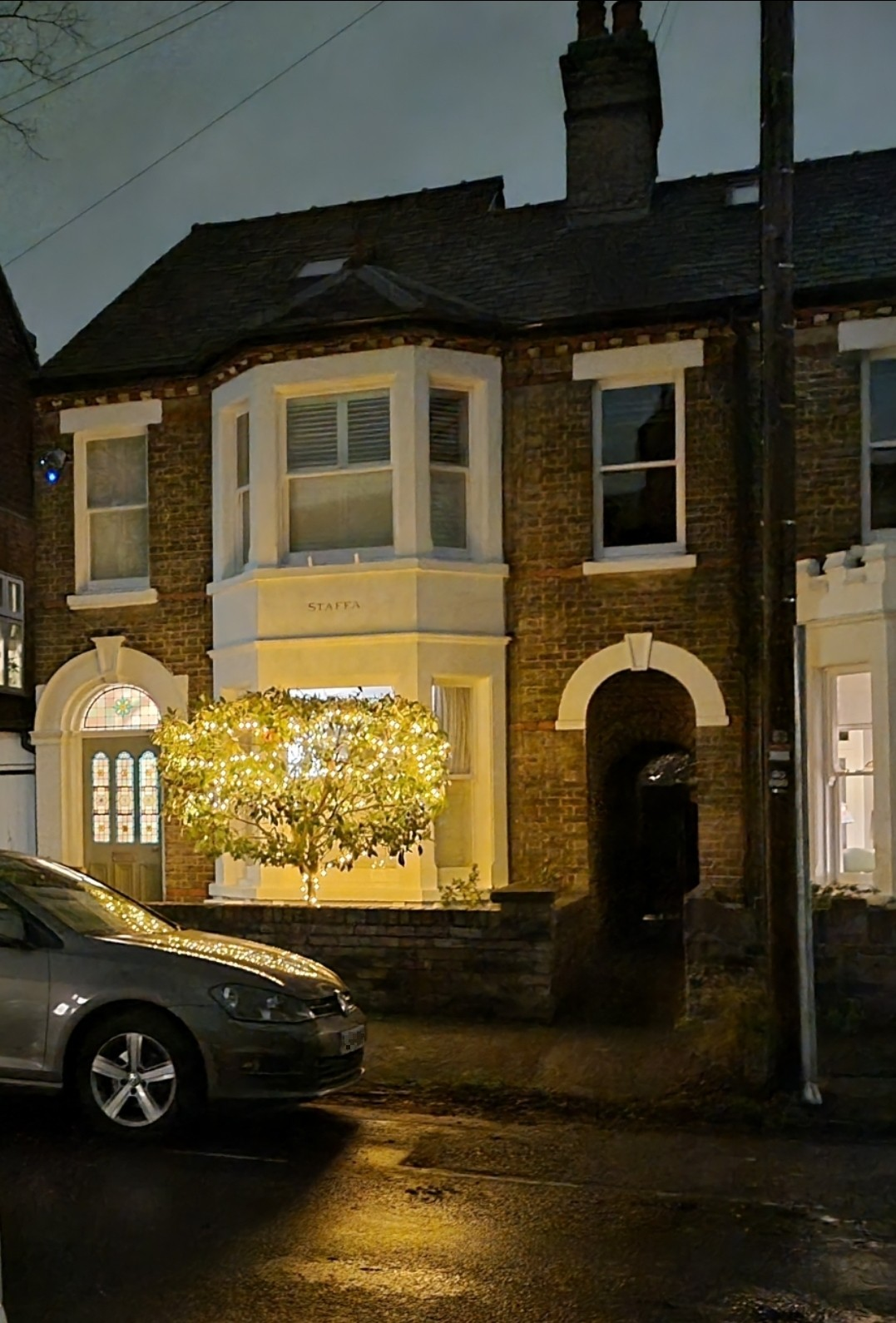
The house in Humberstone Road, Cambridge where Ali lived and wrote "Pakistan" for the first time.

Historian Aqeel Abbas Jafari has noted that that the name "Pakistan" was first used by a Kashmir Journalist, Ghulam Hassan Shah Kazmi on 1 July 1928, when he moved an application before the government in Abbottabad seeking a sanction for publishing a weekly newspaper named "Pakistan". This is the first documented occasion that the word Pakistan had been used. Choudhry Rahmat Ali is said to have suggested the name of the independent Muslim state Pakistan in 1933, 5 years after the name was adopted by Ghulam Hasan Shah Kazmi for his newspaper.

In 1930, Ali moved to a house in Cambridge, on 3 Humberstone Road, it was in one of the rooms of this house that he is said to have written the word 'Pakistan' for the first time. According to Ali's secretary Miss Frost, he came up with the idea while riding on the top of a London bus.

After the creation of the name there are a couple of accounts of him first discussing it, according to a friend, Abdul Kareem Jabbar, the name came up when Ali was walking along the banks of the Thames in 1932 with his friends Pir Ahsan-ud-Din and Khwaja Abdul Rahim. In the 1930s, the London General Omnibus Company (LGOC) operated numerous bus routes that served the banks of the River Thames, especially around central London (Westminster, Embankment, Blackfriars, Southwark, and Tower Bridge). Key services included Routes 11, 24, 59, and 76, which ran along or crossed near the Thames, linking north–south London and providing access to the Embankment and bridges.

Sir Mohammad Iqbal said that Rahmat Ali visited him in London when he was there for the First Round Table Conference in 1930 and asked him what he would call the government of the Muslim state he had proposed in Allahabad. Iqbal told him that he would call it "Pakistan" as an acronym based on the provinces' names. In 1930, St. James’s Palace was served by several London General Omnibus Company (LGOC) routes running along Pall Mall, Piccadilly, and St. James’s Street, placing the palace within easy reach of central bus services. The most notable were Route 3, Route 12, and Route 38, which connected the West End to areas like Brixton, Dulwich, and Clapton.

According to Ali's biographer Khursheed Kamal Aziz, the idea came to Ali in December 1932 "or a little earlier" while he was travelling on the top deck of a route 11 bus, Aziz states that Ali had "told this to his secretary, Miss Frost, on returning to Cambridge" and that she in turn had told Aziz when he interviewed her. On the bus journey Ali had a eureka moment and the "word flashed on the screen of his mind."

On 28 January 1933, Ali voiced the idea in a pamphlet titled "Now or Never; Are We to Live or Perish Forever?". The word 'Pakstan' referred to "the five Northern units of India, viz., Punjab, North-West Frontier Province (Afghania), Kashmir, Sindh and Baluchistan". By the end of 1933, 'Pakistan' had become common vocabulary, and an i was added to ease pronunciation (as in Afghan-i-stan). Ali also wrote that this would be followed by "reintegration of the three Muslim Asian homelands of Afghanistan, Iran and Tajikistan" into Pakistan, a reference to Northwest India's political, historical and cultural affiliations with West Asia.

In a subsequent book, Ali discussed the etymology in further detail: 'Pakistan' is both a Persian and an Urdu word. It is composed of letters taken from the names of all our South Asia homelands; that is, Punjab, Afghania, Kashmir, Sindh and Balochistan. It means the land of the Paks – the spiritually pure and clean.

Ali's pamphlet described the Muslims of his proposed 'Pakistan' as a 'nation', which later formed the foundation for the two-nation theory of the All-India Muslim League:

Our religion and culture, our history and tradition, our social code and economic system, and our laws of inheritance, succession and marriage are fundamentally different from those of most people's living in the rest of India. The ideals which move our people to make the highest sacrifices are essentially different from those which inspire the Hindus to do the same. These differences are not confined to broad, basic principles. Far from it. They extend to the minutest details of our lives. We do not inter-dine; we do not inter-marry. Our national customs and calendars, even our diet and dress are different.

— Choudhry Rahmat Ali in January 1933

Ali believed that the delegates of the first and second Round Table Conferences committed 'an inexcusable blunder and an incredible betrayal' by accepting the principle of an All-India Federation. He demanded that the national status of the 30 million Muslims of the northwestern units be recognized, and a separate Federal Constitution be granted to them.

Ali's biographer, K. K. Aziz writes, "Rahmat Ali alone drafted this declaration" (in which the word Pakistan was used for the first time), but to make it "representative" he began to look around for people who would sign it along with him. This search did not prove easy, "for so firm was the grip of 'Muslim Indian Nationalism' on our young intellectuals at English universities that it took me (Rahmat Ali) more than a month to find three young men in London who offered to support and sign it." Later on, his political opponents used the name of these signatories and other friends of Ali, as creators of the word 'Pakistan'.

Choudhary Rehmat Ali was the personality who started independence movement in the name of Pakistan. He gave idea of two nations in 1915. He formed Pakistan National Movement in 1934 and also released fortnightly Pakistan newspaper in 1935.

== Opposition to "Indianism" ==
According to his writings, "Indianism" meant emphasizing the abode and culture of the "caste Hindus" as the primary and essential constituent of a subcontinent-wide nation. It was in his view Indianism was "the designation of a State created by the British for the first time in history", citing that the Indian National Congress being established in 1885 as evidence that Indianism originated in the hands of the British in the service of British imperialism. He criticizes the notion of the unity of "the country of India"; instead he considers it a continent with a wide variety of nations, ethnicities and religions, and that the Muslims, Sikhs, the Marathas, the Achhūts (untouchables) and the Rajputs were in fact separate nations, on whom the fetters of "Indianism" were fastened by imposing on all of them this "preposterous prefix of All-India".

== Iqbal and Jinnah ==
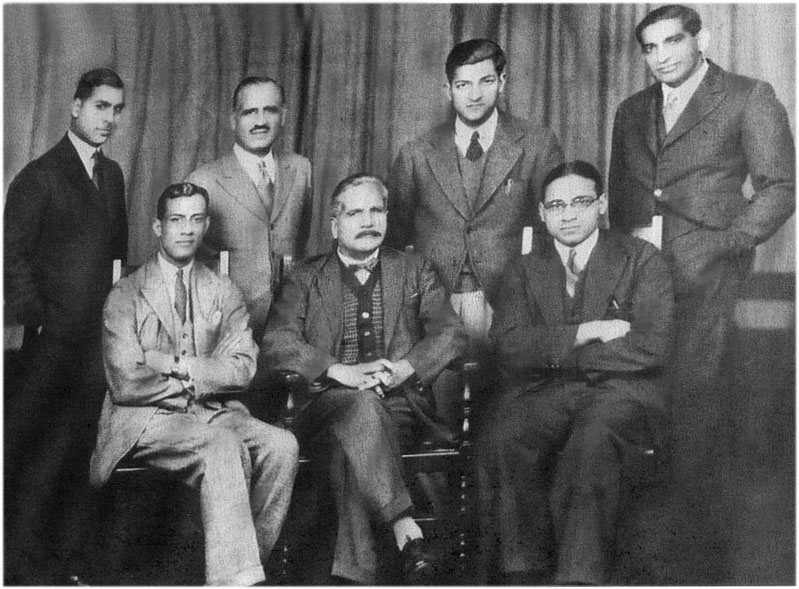
Allama Iqbal with prominent Muslims in London, 1932. Sitting l to r: Chaudhri Rehmat Ali, Allama Iqbal, Kh. Abdul Rahim. Standing l to r: Mian Abdul Haq, Sitara-e-Quaid-e-Azam, Malik Ghulam Mohammad of Kalabagh, Pir Ahsan-ud-Din, Ghulam Mohammad.

On 29 December 1930, Muhammad Iqbal delivered his presidential address, wherein he said:

I would like to see Punjab, North-West Frontier Province, Sindh and Baluchistan amalgamated into a single State. Self-government within the British Empire, or without the British Empire, the formation of a consolidated North-West Indian Muslim State appears to me to be the final destiny of the Muslims, at least of North-West India.

According to some scholars, Iqbal had not presented the idea of an autonomous Muslim State; rather he wanted a large Muslim province by amalgamating Punjab, Sindh, NWFP and Baluchistan into a big North-Western province within India. They argue that Iqbal never called for any kind of partition of the country.

On 28 January 1933, Choudhry Rahmat Ali voiced his ideas on 'Pakistan'. By the end of 1933, the word "Pakistan" became common vocabulary where an "I" was added to ease pronunciation (as in Afghan-i-stan). In a subsequent book Rahmat Ali discussed the etymology in further detail: "'Pakistan' is both a Persian and an Urdu word. It is composed of letters taken from the names of all our homelands- " Indian " and " Asian." That is, Punjab, Afghania, Kashmir, Iran, Sindh and Balochistan. It means the land of the Pure."

Jawaharlal Nehru had written in his book on the scheme: "Iqbal was one of the early advocates of Pakistan and yet he appears to have realised its inherent danger and absurdity. Edward Thompson has written that in the course of the conversation, Iqbal told him that he had advocated Pakistan because of his position as President of the Muslim League session, but he felt sure that it would be injurious to India as a whole and Muslims especially."

In 1934, Choudhry Rahmat Ali and his friends met Muhammad Ali Jinnah and appealed for his support of the Pakistan idea. He replied, "My dear boys, don't be in a hurry; let the waters flow and they will find their own level."

== Proposed maps and names ==
Ali published several pamphlets where he called himself the "Founder of the Pakistan National Movement". In these pamphlets he included maps of the subcontinent with potential Muslim states, including Haideristan, Siddiqistan, Faruqistan, Muinistan and Maplistan. Safiistan and Nasaristan were proposed on Sri Lanka.

In his maps he renamed the Indian subcontinent 'Pakasia' or more often 'Dinia' (an anagram of "India" with position of 'D' changed), meaning "Land of the Faith" in Arabic (from the word "deen"). Dinia was represented with dependencies Pakistan, Osmanistan (representing Hyderabad Deccan and neighbouring areas) and Bangistan (representing Bengal). He proposed the former Muslim provinces of Eastern Bengal and Assam in East India to become Bangistan, an independent Muslim state for Bengali, Assamese and Bihari Muslims. He proposed the princely Hyderabad State, to become an Islamic monarchy called Osmanistan. Ali also renamed the seas around the Indian subcontinent, and referred the seas around landmass of Dinia as the Bangian, Pakian and Osmanian seas that were his proposed names for the Bay of Bengal, Arabian Sea, and the Indian Ocean respectively.

These alternate geographical maps of the subcontinent were followed by the mention of Rahmat Ali’s position as the "founder of the Siddiqistan, Nasaristan and Safiistan National Movements". Ali even referred to the Andamans as the "Ashur Islands" and the Nicobars as the "Balus Islands" in such maps.

Mian Abdul Haq, a contemporary of Rahmat Ali at the University of Cambridge, stated that, after 1935, Rahmat Ali's mental makeup changed resulting from a study of "major Nazi works, of which he knew many passages by heart."

== After the creation of Pakistan ==
While Choudhry Rahmat Ali was a leading figure for the conception of Pakistan, he lived most of his adult life in England.

After the partition and creation of Pakistan in 1947, Ali returned to Lahore, Pakistan on 6 April 1948. He had been voicing his dissatisfaction with the creation of Pakistan ever since his arrival in Lahore. He was unhappy over a smaller Pakistan than the one he had conceived in his 1933 pamphlet. He condemned Jinnah for accepting a smaller Pakistan, calling him "Quisling-e-Azam." (Note: The branding of Jinnah is found in Ali's 1947 pamphlet titled The Greatest Betrayal, the Millat’s Martyrdom & The Muslim’s Duty. "Quisling" is an allusion to Vidkun Quisling, a Norwegian leader who ran a puppet regime under Nazis. Rahmat Ali may have introduced this term into South Asian politics, which was later used by the prime minister Liaquat Ali Khan to brand the Kashmiri leader Sheikh Abdullah.)

Ali had planned to stay in the country, but he was expelled from Pakistan by the then Prime Minister Liaqat Ali Khan. His belongings were confiscated, and he left empty-handed for England in October 1948.

== Death ==
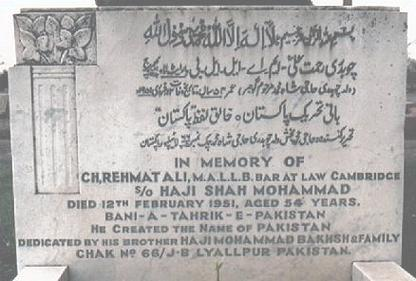
Headstone of Ali's Grave

Ali died on 3 February 1951 in Cambridge. According to his secretary Thelma Frost, he was "destitute, forlorn and lonely" at the time of his death. Fearing (correctly) that he may have died insolvent, the Master of Emmanuel College, Cambridge, Edward Welbourne, instructed that the College would cover the funeral expenses. He was buried on 20 February at Cambridge City Cemetery in Cambridge, England. The funeral expenses and other medical expenses were repaid by the High Commissioner for Pakistan in November 1953, after what was described as a “protracted correspondence” between the London office and the relevant authorities in Pakistan.

His obituary in Emmanuel College Magazine 1950-51 (that covers the academic year starting in Michaelmas term 1950 and ending in Easter term 1951) notes: "It may not be the function of a College magazine to awaken the rancours of the politics of other lands, but it would be absurd not to record the fact that this obscure and single-handed undergraduate of Emmanuel College, who died in Cambridge in the influenza epidemic of the spring of this year and who is buried in the Newmarket Road cemetery, has influenced world events, and may yet influence the future, more than falls to the lot of most men."

== Legacy ==
Rahmat Ali is credited by Pakistanis for having coined the term "Pakistan" and envisioning a separate state for Muslims. Beyond that, his ideas are not explored in any detail.

Ali's house in Cambridge has become a minor tourist attraction for Pakistani visitors. In an interview with the University of Cambridge's Varsity newspaper, the current owner of the house, Juliet Mills, said they "do get people coming to the door asking to look around".

== Works ==
- Now or Never; Are We to Live or Perish Forever?, also known as the "Pakistan Declaration", (1933)
- What Does the Pakistan National Movement Stand For? (Cambridge: Pakistan National Movement, 1933)
- Letters to the Members of the British Parliament (Cambridge, 8 July 1935)
- Islamic Fatherland and the Indian Federation: The Fight Will Go on for Pakistan (Cambridge: Pakistan National Movement, 1935)
- Letter to The Times, 8 December 1938
- The Millat of Islam and the Menace of Indianism (Cambridge: Pakistan National Movement, 1942)
- The Millat and the Mission: Seven Commandments of Destiny for the 'Seventh' Continent of Dinia (Cambridge: Pakistan National Movement, 1942) in which Rahmat Ali proposed relabeling the Indian subcontinent as its anagram Dinia. The word Dinia was made by moving the letter d that appears in the middle of the word 'India' to the beginning.
- The Millat and her Minorities: Foundation of Faruqistan for the Muslims of Bihar and Orissa (Cambridge: The Faruqistan National Movement, 1943)
- The Millat and her Minorities: Foundation of Haideristan for Muslims of Hindoostan (Cambridge: The Haideristan National Movement, 1943)
- The Millat and her Minorities: Foundation of Maplistan for Muslims of South India (Cambridge: The Maplistan National Movement, 1943)
- The Millat and her Minorities: Foundation of Muinistan for Muslims of Rajistan (Cambridge: The Muinistan National Movement, 1943)
- The Millat and her Minorities: Foundation of Siddiqistan for Muslims of Central India (Cambridge: The Siddiqistan National Movement, 1943)
- The Millat and her Minorities: Foundation of Safiistan for Muslims of Western Ceylon (Cambridge: The Safiistan National Movement, 1943)
- The Millat and her Minorities: Foundation of Nasaristan for Muslims of Eastern Ceylon (Cambridge: The Nasaristan National Movement, 1943)
- The Millat and her Ten Nations: Foundation of the All-Dinia Milli Movement (Cambridge: The All-Dinia Milli Movement, 1944)
- Dinia: The Seventh Continent of the World (Cambridge: Dinia Continental Movement, 1946)
- India: The Continent of Dinia, or the Country of Doom (Cambridge: Dinia Continental Movement, 1946)
- The Pakistan National Movement and the British Verdict on India (Cambridge: Pakistan National Movement, 1946)
- Pakasia: The Historic Orbit of the Pak Culture (Cambridge: The Pakasia Cultural Movement, 1946)
- Osmanistan: The Fatherland of the Osman Nation (Cambridge: The Osmanistan National Movement, 1946)
- The Greatest Betrayal: How to Redeem the Millat? (Cambridge: Pakistan National Movement, 1947)
- Pakistan: The Fatherland of the Pak Nation, (Cambridge: Pakistan National Liberation Movement, 1947)
- The Muslim Minority in India and the Saving Duty of the U.N.O. (Cambridge: The All-Dinia Milli Liberation Movement, 1948)
- The Muslim Minority in India and the Dinian Mission to the U.N.O. (Cambridge: The All-Dinia Milli Liberation Movement, 1949)
- Pakistan or Pastan? Destiny or Disintegration? (Cambridge: The Pakistan National Liberation Movement, 1950)
- Complete Works of Rahmat Ali, ed. Khursheed Kamal Aziz (Islamabad: National Commission on Historical and Cultural Research, 1978)

== See also ==
- Indian Independence Movement
- Muslim nationalism in South Asia
- Pakistani nationalism
- Two-nation theory
- All India Muslim League
  - Muslim League (Pakistan)
- Punjab Muslim League
- Qazi Abdur Rehman Amritsari

== Bibliography ==
- Aziz, Khursheed Kamal (1987), Rahmat Ali: a biography, Steiner Verlag Wiesbaden, ISBN 978-3-515-05051-7
- Jalal, Ayesha (2002), Self and Sovereignty: Individual and Community in South Asian Islam Since 1850, Routledge, ISBN 978-1-134-59937-0
- Kamran, Tahir (2017), "Choudhary Rahmat Ali and his Political Imagination: Pak Plan and the Continent of Dinia", in Ali Usman Qasmi; Megan Eaton Robb (eds.), Muslims against the Muslim League, Cambridge University Press, pp. 82–108, ISBN 978-1-107-16663-9
