= Dinia subapicalis =

Scientific classification
- Kingdom: Animalia
- Phylum: Arthropoda
- Class: Insecta
- Order: Lepidoptera
- Superfamily: Noctuoidea
- Family: Erebidae
- Subfamily: Arctiinae
- Genus: Dinia
- Species: D. subapicalis

Binomial name
- Dinia subapicalis (Walker, 1854)

Synonyms
- Glaucopis subapicalis Walker, 1854; Lasioprocta merra Wallengren, 1858

Species of moth

Dinia subapicalis is a moth of the family Erebidae. It was described by Francis Walker in 1854. It is found in Peru and southern Ecuador.
