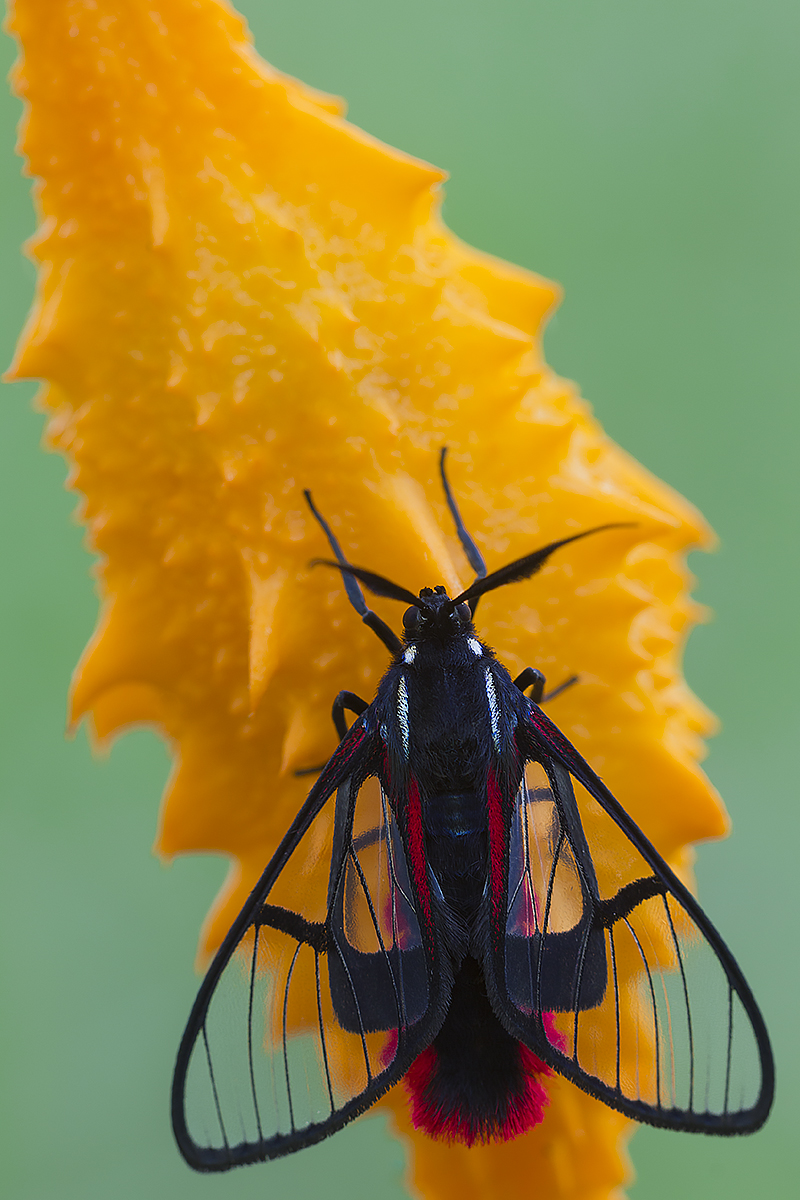

Scientific classification
- Kingdom: Animalia
- Phylum: Arthropoda
- Clade: Pancrustacea
- Class: Insecta
- Order: Lepidoptera
- Superfamily: Noctuoidea
- Family: Erebidae
- Subfamily: Arctiinae
- Genus: Dinia
- Species: D. eagrus

Binomial name
- Dinia eagrus (Cramer, [1779])

Synonyms
- Sphinx eagrus Cramer, [1779]; Glaucopis auge Walker, 1854

= Dinia eagrus =

Scarlet-tipped wasp mimic moth

Species of moth

Dinia eagrus, the scarlet-tipped wasp mimic moth, is a moth of the family Erebidae. The species was first described by Pieter Cramer in 1779.

== Description ==
The wingspan of Dinia eagrus can reach about 30 millimetres (1.2 in). The wings are hyaline (glass like), except for the brown veins and border and a brown mark across the forewings. The body is black brown with some metallic blue stripes, hairy, flat and broad. The abdomen is black and long with bright/red margins and tip.

== Distribution ==
This species can be found in Mexico, Guatemala, Costa Rica, Nicaragua, Panama, Honduras and Rio de Janeiro, Brazil.
