= Pakistan National Movement =

The Pakistan National Movement (Urdu: تحریک قومی پاکستان; Persian: جنبش ملی پاکستان) was founded in 1933 by Choudhry Rahmat Ali who is also credited with creating the name "Pakistan", for a separate Muslim homeland in South Asia. After publishing the declaration Now or Never, he felt the need of putting up a co-operative effort to publicize and promote his ideas. He started the movement by publishing an eight-page pamphlet.

== What does the Pakistan National Movement Stand For? ==
In this pamphlet the author stated the fundamentals of the political ideology" of the movement by criticizing "Indianism." He defined "Indianism" as the force which had dominated all the countries of South Asia and defeated the efforts of their peoples to improve their lot. This was a destructive power victimizing men and nations, crippling religions and states, enslaving at least half of the continent of Asia. With the coming of the British it had manifested itself in the establishment of the Indian National Congress. The motive of this Congress was to establish an All India Federation. The congress had designated all British possessions in South Asia as India denied to the non Indian nations the right to their own nationhood, and, by making pretentious claims, stamped Indian nationality on the peoples of this area.

This was the central idea underlying the proposal for an all India federal constitution. The PNM was formed to fight against this federation

== Pakistan Declaration ==
The Pakistan Declaration (titled Now or Never; Are We to Live or Perish Forever?) was a pamphlet published on 28 January 1933 by Choudhary Rahmat Ali, in which the word Pakistan was used for the first time and was presented in the round table conference in 1933. The pamphlet started with this famous sentence:

At this solemn hour in the history of India, when British and Indian statesmen are laying the foundations of a Federal Constitution for that land, we address this appeal to you, in the name of our common heritage, on behalf of our thirty million Muslim brethren who live in PAKSTAN - by which we mean the five Northern units of India, Viz: Punjab, North-West Frontier Province (Afghan Province), Kashmir, Sind and Baluchistan.

The pamphlet asked that "the five Northern units of India" - Punjab, North-West Frontier Province (Afghan Province), Kashmir, Sindh and Baluchistan (or Pakstan) become a state independent of the proposed Indian Federation.

== Aimes and objectives ==
The following were the aims and objective of the movement:

- The movement stood for "the spiritual liberation of the nations of South Asia from the secular thraldom of Indianism.
- The movement stood for "the cultural liberation of the nations of South Asia from the barbarian influence of Indianism
- The movement stood for "the social liberation of nations of South Asia from the clan tyranny of Indianism.
- The movement stood for "the economic liberation of the nations of South Asia from the impoverishing capitalism of Indianism.
- The movement stood for "the national liberation of the peoples of South Asia from the destructive domination of Indianism.
- The movement stood for "the inter national consolidation of the nations of South Asia against the de-nationalizing dangers of Indianism.
- The movement stood for "the creation of a new order of Asianism to take the place of the old order of Indianism in South Asia.

The founder of this movement strongly believed in the right of self-determination of all Indian minorities, all oppressed and disinherited peoples of India.

In 1934, Choudhry Rahmat Ali began recruitment campaign for this movement. Membership forms were typed on quarto-size paper, and they carried the aims and objects of the movement. The membership fee was one shilling per year.

Choudhry Rahmat Ali propagated the Scheme of Pakistan with a missionary zeal since its inception in 1933. This movement led to the commencement of Pakistan Movement, and consequently the creation of Pakistan as an independent state in 1947. The moverment came to an end with the death of its founder in 1951.

== See also ==
- Two-Nation Theory
- Allahabad Address
