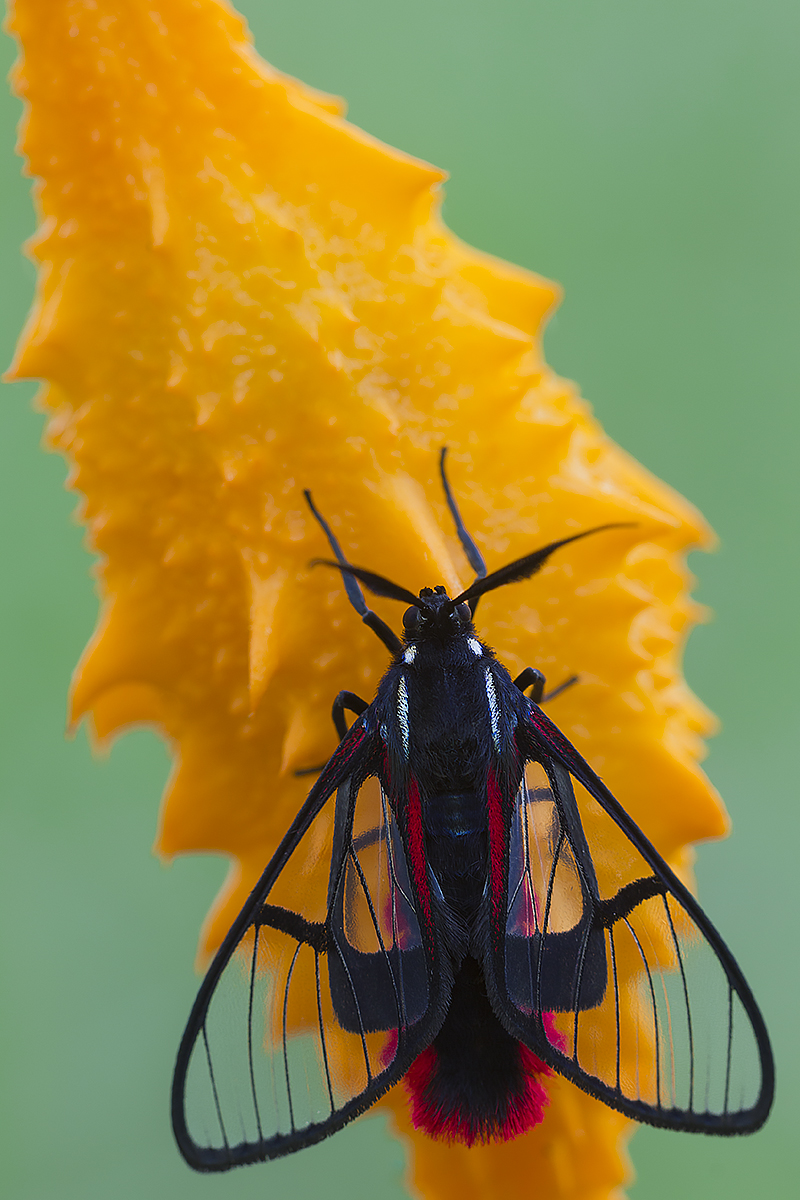
- Dinia eagrus

Scientific classification
- Domain: Eukaryota
- Kingdom: Animalia
- Phylum: Arthropoda
- Class: Insecta
- Order: Lepidoptera
- Superfamily: Noctuoidea
- Family: Erebidae
- Subfamily: Arctiinae
- Subtribe: Euchromiina
- Genus: Dinia; Walker, 1854

Synonyms
- Lasioprocta Wallengren, 1858

= Dinia (moth) =

Genus of moths

Dinia is a genus of moths in the family Erebidae. The genus was erected by Francis Walker in 1854.

== Species ==
- Dinia eagrus (Cramer, [1779])
- Dinia mena (Hübner, [1827])
- Dinia subapicalis (Walker, 1854)
