= Tahir Kamran =

Pakistani historian

Tahir Kamran, (Urdu: طاھر کامران), is a Pakistani historian and former Iqbal fellow at the University of Cambridge, as professor in the Centre of South Asian Studies. He has authored four books and has written several articles specifically on the history of the Punjab, sectarianism, democracy, and governance. He was the head of the department of history when he founded a semi-annual scholarly journal, The Historian.

He has been influential in the Higher Education Commission of Pakistan and implemented methods to improve educational standards in Pakistan.

Kamran has been a visiting fellow at Southampton University, the SOAS and at the University of Cambridge. He remained associated with Government College University, Lahore as chairperson of Department of History and the dean of the Faculty of Arts and Social Sciences of the university till January 10, 2018.

Tahir Kamran established Khaldunia Centre for Historical Research in Lahore. The Centre publishes academic books. Under the auspices of the Centre, he leads a team which edits a semi-annual scholarly journal, Pakistan Journal of Historical Studies. The journal, which primarily focuses on histories of emotions and animals, is edited in Pakistan and published in the USA by Indiana University Press, Bloomington.

Tahir Kamran is instrumental in internationalizing the Government College University Lahore. Due to his efforts, the number of international students in the University has increased considerably.

== Bibliography ==
- Kamran, Tahir (1993). Idea of history through ages. Location: Progressive Publishers.
- Faith-Based Violence and Deobandi Militancy in Pakistan
- Tareekh-i-Pakistan, from 1707 to 1988 (History of Pakistan 1707-1988), Lahore: Majeed Book Depot, 1993.
  - Also translated in Urdu: Jamhoriyat aur Tarz-i-Hukamrani, Lahore: South Asia Partnership, 2009.
- (Co-edited), Critical Perspectives on Social Sciences in Pakistan. Lahore: GC University, 2008.
- Democracy and Governance in Pakistan, Lahore: South Asia Partnership, 2008
- Kamran, Tahir. Democracy and Governance in Pakistan. Lahore: South Asia Partnership — Pakistan, 2008. OCLC 276144654
  - Also translated in Urdu: Pakistan mein Jamhuriat aur Governance (Lahore: South Asia Partnership, 2008)
- Role of Election Commission in Pakistan Politics, Lahore: South Asia Partnership, 2009
- Kamran, Tahir. Election Commission of Pakistan: Role in Politics. Lahore: South Asia Partnership — Pakistan, 2009. OCLC 608495037
- With Ian Talbot, Lahore: In the Raj London: Hurst & Co., 2016.
- Kamran, Tahir (September 2017). "Pakistan : a failed state?". History Today. 67 (9): 24–35.

Translations (Urdu)

- Punjab Mein Zarai Paidawar Aur Nau Abadyati Policy, Trans. of J. S. Grewal, Tareekh Oct, 2003
- Ru Ba Taraqi Riyasat Ka Mazi Aur Mustaqbil, Trans. of Amiya Kumar Bagchi, Tareekh, Apr, 2003
- Aik Masa’la: Tareekh Ki Tahreer-I-Nau, Trans. of Niladri Bhattacharia, Tareekh, 2003
- Kisan Aur Inqilab, Trans. of Hamza Alvi, Tareekh, 1999
- Pakistan - Raisat Ka Bohran, Anthology of Hamza Alavi’s sociological writings, (Lahore: Fiction House, 2002)
- Jagirdari aur Samraj, Anthology of Hamza Alavi’s sociological writings, (Lahore: Fiction House, 1999)
- Punjab mein baen bazoo kee Tareekh. Trans. of Dr Ajit Javed, Left Politics in Punjab, (Lahore, Fiction House: Lahore, 1997)
- Khizar Tiwana, Trans. of Ian Talbot, Khizar Tiwana, (Lahore: Fiction House, 1996)
- Punjab: Ghulami say Azadi Tuk (1849-11947), Trans of Ian Talbot, Punjab and the Raj, (Lahore: Takhliqaat, 1996)
- Pakistan kay Muashi, Siasi aur Talimi Masail, Trans. of Abdus Samad, Problems of Governance in Pakistan, (Lahore: Fiction House, 1996)
